= List of monuments in Għajnsielem =

This is a list of monuments in Għajnsielem, Gozo, Malta, which are listed on the National Inventory of the Cultural Property of the Maltese Islands., as well as Grade 1 scheduled properties from the Malta Scheduled Property Register maintained by Malta's Planning Authority. The latter are denoted by an ID beginning with the letters MSPR.

== List ==
Name of object	Location	Coordinates	ID	Photo	Upload
St Mary Tower	Triq il-Gvernatur, Comino	36°00′25″N 14°19′48″E	00031	St Mary Tower	Upload Photo
Mġarr ix-Xini Tower	Ta' Mġarr ix-Xini	36°01′02″N 14°16′28″E	00037	Mġarr ix-Xini Tower	Upload Photo
St Cecilia Chapel	Triq Ta'Lambert	36°01′43″N 14°16′26″E	00041	St Cecilia Chapel	Upload Photo
St. Mary Battery	Comino	36°00′24″N 14°20′46″E	00042	St. Mary Battery	Upload Photo
Parish Church of Our Lady of Loreto	Triq J.F. De Cambray	36°01′35″N 14°17′22″E	01063	Parish Church of Our Lady of Loreto	Upload Photo
Niche of St. Anthony of Padua	20 Pjazza Madonna Ta' Loreto	36°01′37″N 14°17′24″E	01064	Niche of St. Anthony of Padua	Upload Photo
Niche of the Madonna of Safe Haven	Triq Ramon Perellos c/w Pjazza Independenza	36°01′38″N 14°17′25″E	01065	Niche of the Madonna of Safe Haven	Upload Photo
Church of Our Lady of Loreto	Pjazza Independenza	36°01′39″N 14°17′23″E	01066	Church of Our Lady of Loreto	Upload Photo
Relief of St. Joseph	"Casa di San Giuseppe", Triq L-Imġarr	36°01′25″N 14°17′21″E	01067		Upload Photo
Niche of St. Francis of Assisi	9 Triq Sant'Antnin	36°01′42″N 14°17′50″E	01068	Niche of St. Francis of Assisi	Upload Photo
Niche of Christ the Nazarene	"Palalu", 14 Triq Sant'Antnin	36°01′40″N 14°17′50″E	01069	Niche of Christ the Nazarene	Upload Photo
Church of St. Anthony of Padua	Triq Sant'Antnin	36°01′46″N 14°17′48″E	01070	Church of St. Anthony of Padua	Upload Photo
Statue of St. Paul	85 Triq Sant'Antnin	36°01′48″N 14°17′49″E	01071		Upload Photo
Niche of the Madonna of Mount Carmel	124 Triq il-Ħamri	36°01′37″N 14°17′31″E	01072	Niche of the Madonna of Mount Carmel	Upload Photo
Niche of St. Andrew	Gleneagles Bar, Triq Martino Garces	36°01′28″N 14°17′48″E	01073		Upload Photo
Church of the Madonna of Lourdes	Triq Lourdes	36°01′30″N 14°17′43″E	01074	Church of the Madonna of Lourdes	Upload Photo
Statue of the Madonna of Lourdes	Triq Lourdes	36°01′30″N 14°17′43″E	01075	Statue of the Madonna of Lourdes	Upload Photo
Niche of the Madonna of Mount Carmel	125 Triq L-Imġarr	36°01′35″N 14°17′08″E	01076		Upload Photo
Niche of St. Anthony of Padua	Triq Borġ Għarib	36°01′47″N 14°17′06″E	01077		Upload Photo
Niche of the Madonna of Mount Carmel	Triq Manoel de Vilhena (a passage-way by IGYC)	36°01′29″N 14°17′47″E	01078	Niche of the Madonna of Mount Carmel	Upload Photo
Niche of the Crucifix	Triq ix-Xatt (next to the police station)	36°01′25″N 14°17′50″E	01079	Niche of the Crucifix	Upload Photo
Church of the Return of the Blessed Virgin from Egypt	Triq il-Gvernatur, Comino	36°00′54″N 14°20′09″E	01080	Church of the Return of the Blessed Virgin from Egypt	Upload Photo
Relief of the Sacred Heart of Jesus	14 Triq il-Fawwara	36°01′37″N 14°17′27″E	01081	Relief of the Sacred Heart of Jesus	Upload Photo
Niche of the Madonna of Mount Carmel	24 Triq il-Fawwara	36°01′37″N 14°17′27″E	01082	Niche of the Madonna of Mount Carmel	Upload Photo
Fort Chambrai	Triq Chambray	36°01′22″N 14°17′34″E	01361	Fort Chambrai	Upload Photo
Notre Dame Bastion - Fort Chambrai	Fort Chambray	36°01′25″N 14°17′38″E	01362		Upload Photo
St Paul Bastion - Fort Chambrai	Fort Chambray	36°01′25″N 14°17′31″E	01363		Upload Photo
St Anthony Bastion - Fort Chambrai	Fort Chambray	36°01′21″N 14°17′27″E	01364		Upload Photo
Guardian Angel Bastion - Fort Chambrai	Fort Chambray	36°01′17″N 14°17′31″E	01365	Guardian Angel Bastion - Fort Chambrai	Upload Photo
Curtain wall with main entrance - Fort Chambrai	Fort Chambray	36°01′24″N 14°17′34″E	01366	Curtain wall with main entrance - Fort Chambrai	Upload Photo
Right Ravelin - Fort Chambrai	Fort Chambray	36°01′25″N 14°17′34″E	01367	Right Ravelin - Fort Chambrai	Upload Photo
Left Ravelin - Fort Chambrai	Fort Chambray	36°01′24″N 14°17′28″E	01368	Left Ravelin - Fort Chambrai	Upload Photo
Curtain wall linking St Anthony Bastion to St Paul Bastion - Fort Chambrai	Fort Chambray	36°01′22″N 14°17′29″E	01369		Upload Photo
Curtain wall linking St Anthony Bastion to Guardian Angel Bastion - Fort Chambrai	Fort Chambray	36°01′18″N 14°17′28″E	01370		Upload Photo
Central Counterguard - Fort Chambrai	Fort Chambray	36°01′26″N 14°17′31″E	01371		Upload Photo
Covertway - Fort Chambrai	Fort Chambray	36°01′27″N 14°17′30″E	01372		Upload Photo
Ditch - Fort Chambrai	Fort Chambray	36°01′23″N 14°17′29″E	01373		Upload Photo
Mgarr facing front - Fort Chambrai	Fort Chambray	36°01′22″N 14°17′42″E	01374	Mgarr facing front - Fort Chambrai	Upload Photo
Cliff face - Fort Chambrai	Rdum it-Tafal	36°01′18″N 14°17′35″E	01375	Cliff face - Fort Chambrai	Upload Photo
Polverista - Fort Chambrai	Guardian Angel Bastion	36°01′16″N 14°17′30″E	01376	Polverista - Fort Chambrai	Upload Photo
Żewwieqa Entrenchment	Mġarr	36°01′36″N 14°18′28″E	01418	Żewwieqa Entrenchment	Upload Photo
Xatt l-Ahmar Fougasse	Ix-Xatt l-Aħmar	36°01′10″N 14°17′16″E	01437		Upload Photo
Mġarr Fougasse			01440		Upload Photo
Sta. Cecilia Tower	Triq Ta'Lambert / Triq L-Imġarr	36°01′45″N 14°16′26″E	01443	Sta. Cecilia Tower	Upload Photo
Fort Chambray (excluding recent development)	Fort Chambray		MSPR0046		Upload Photo
Notre Dame Demi Lune as part of Fort Chambray			MSPR0047		Upload Photo
St. Anthony's Demi Lune as part of Fort Chambray	Fort Chambray		MSPR0048		Upload Photo
Knight's Barracks as part of Fort Chambray	Fort Chambray		MSPR0049		Upload Photo
St. Paul's Counterguard as part of Fort Chambray	Fort Chambray		MSPR0050		Upload Photo
Notre Dame Demi Lune as part of Fort Chambray	Fort Chambray		MSPR0051		Upload Photo
Polverista as part of Fort Chambray	Fort Chambray		MSPR0052		Upload Photo
Echaugette as part of Fort Chambray	Fort Chambray		MSPR0053		Upload Photo
Glacis as part of Fort Chambray	Fort Chambray		MSPR0054		Upload Photo
Covered Way as part of Fort Chambray	Fort Chambray		MSPR0055		Upload Photo
Parapet Covered Way as part of Fort Chambray	Fort Chambray		MSPR0056		Upload Photo
Outer Bridge as part of Fort Chambray	Fort Chambray		MSPR0057		Upload Photo
Ditch as part of Fort Chambray	Fort Chambray		MSPR0058		Upload Photo
Inner Bridge as part of Fort Chambray	Fort Chambray		MSPR0059		Upload Photo
Pomerium as part of Fort Chambray	Fort Chambray		MSPR0060		Upload Photo
Enciente as part of Fort Chambray	Fort Chambray		MSPR0061		Upload Photo
Knights' Bakery as part of Fort Chambray	Fort Chambray		MSPR0062		Upload Photo
Main Gate as part of Fort Chambray	Fort Chambray		MSPR0063		Upload Photo
Advanced Gate as part of Fort Chambray	Fort Chambray		MSPR0064		Upload Photo
Old Store House	Triq Manoel de Vilhena		MSPR0065		Upload Photo
Tower of Santa Ċilja	Triq ta' Lambert		MSPR0066		Upload Photo
Chapel of Santa Ċilja	Triq ta' Lambert		MSPR0067		Upload Photo
Tower of Santa Marija	Triq il-Batterija, Kemmuna		MSPR0068		Upload Photo
Mġarr ix-Xini Tower	Ta' Mgarr ix-Xini		MSPR0069		Upload Photo
Żewwieqa Entrenchment	Żewwieqa		MSPR0070		Upload Photo
Comino Battery	Triq il-Batterija, Kemmuna		MSPR0071		Upload Photo
