= St. Cecilia Church =

St. Cecilia Church or variations may refer to:

== England ==
- St Cecilia's Church, Girton

== Italy ==
- Santa Cecilia in Trastevere

== Malta ==
- Santa Cecilia Chapel, Għajnsielem, Gozo, Malta

== United States ==
- St. Cecilia Church (Stamford, Connecticut)
- St. Cecilia's Cathedral, Omaha, Nebraska
- St. Cecilia's Church and Convent (New York City), NRHP-listed
