= Comino Police Station =

Primary Police station on Comino, Malta

- L-għassa tal-Pulizija ta ’Kemmuna
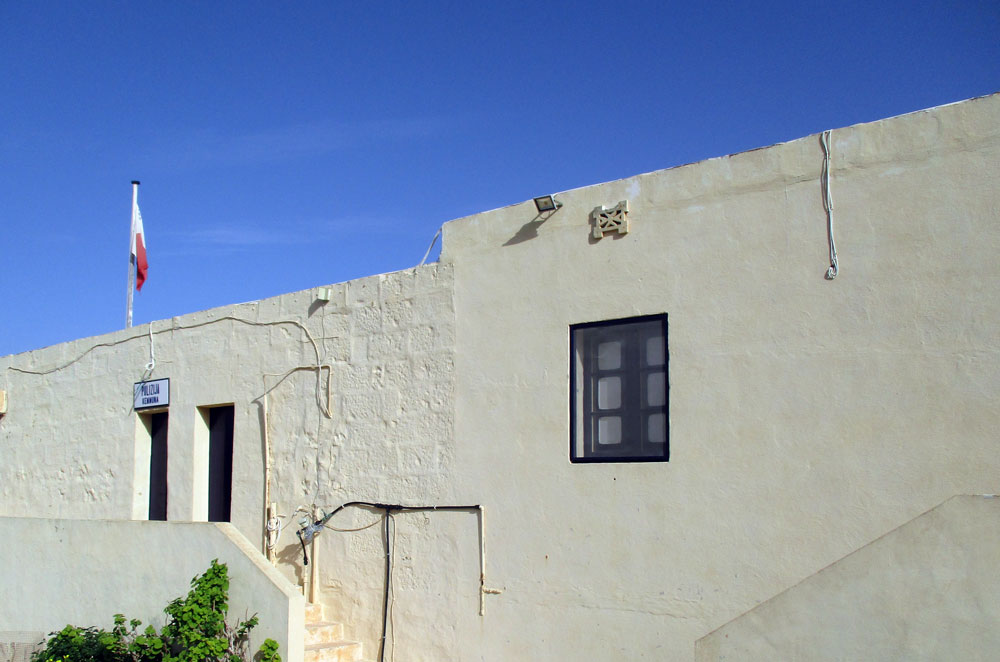

- Location within Malta

General information
- Status: Active
- Location: Comino
- Coordinates: 36°0′59″N 14°20′10″E
- Elevation: 20 ft
- Inaugurated: 1743
- Cost: 456 Scudi
- Owner: Maltese Government

Technical details
- Floor count: 2

The Comino Police Station (Maltese: L-għassa tal-Pulizija ta ’Kemmuna) is the only operating police station located on the small island of Comino in the Maltese Archipelago, on the coast of the Santa Marija Bay, 152 metres (499 ft) north of the Comino Chapel.

== Construction ==
The station was built in 1743 by Grand Master Pinto to halt illegal activities such as smuggling and quarantine evasion that potentially spread the plague. The construction cost 456 scudi.

== Application ==
During World War II, the building was an Allied observation post. Later, officers delivered mail to the island's inhabitants, enforced boat speed limits near beaches and provided first aid.
