= Wirt Għawdex =

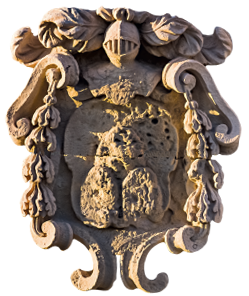
- Wirt Għawdex Coat of Arms
- Formation: 1981
- Location: Victoria, Gozo
- Website: http://www.wirtghawdex.org/

Wirt Għawdex (English: Gozo Heritage) is a non-governmental organisation founded in 1981 with the aims of fostering the knowledge of Gozitan heritage amongst all levels of society and to strive to safeguard the natural, archaeological, historical and anthropological patrimony of the Maltese islands of Gozo and Comino.

== History ==
Since the early 1970s, there has been a continuous attempt to safeguard the historical sites on Gozo and Comino.

Anton Spiteri, and a group of other Gozitan people, wanted to highlight the dilapidated state of the Citadel and to protect it. Initially, the conservation work was concentrated on the Citadel and the name of the organization was initially Il-Belt il-Qadima (Maltese: The Old City). The first project was the restoration of the old St Joseph’s Chapel, which was ready just before St Joseph’s feast in 1974. The work was managed by T. Mercieca, and a plaque commemorates the restoration and re-inauguration. Other projects included the cleaning of the old clock, clearing weeds from the fortifications, maintenance of the cannons on the defensive parapets, and the renovation of the Old Prison.

Later, the organization expanded its interest to works beyond the Citadel, covering Gozo and Comino. At a committee meeting, on 6 July 1981, the decision was made to broaden the scope of work, and to change the official name to reflect the changes. The name Wirt Għawdex was chosen among members alone and the organization has kept the name ever since.

== Sites ==
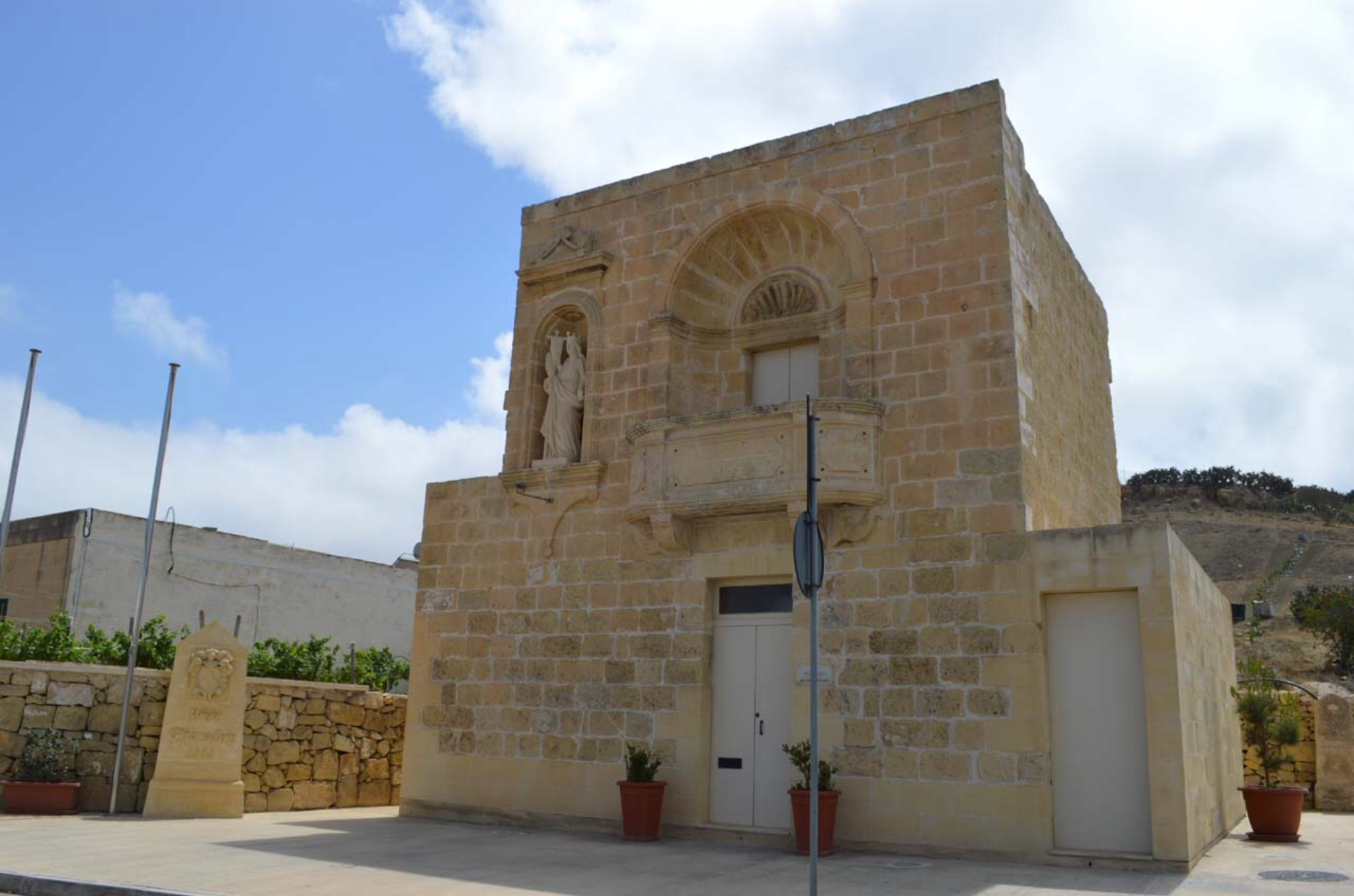
Dar il-Gvernatur, Wirt Għawdex Headquarters

Wirt Għawdex has the following sites under its care :

- Gunpowder Magazine, Silos, World War II shelters & Battery, Cittadella (Gozo)
- Mġarr ix-Xini Tower
- Santa Cecilia Chapel
- Dar il-Gvernatur
