= Saint Mary's Redoubt =

Redoubt in Comino

- Ridott ta' Santa Marija
- Comino, Malta

Site information
- Type: Redoubt

Location
- Coordinates: 36°1′6″N 14°20′21.6″E

Site history
- Built: 1716 or 1761
- Built by: Order of Saint John
- Materials: Limestone
- Fate: Demolished

Saint Mary's Redoubt (Maltese: Ridott ta' Santa Marija), also known as Migart Redoubt (Maltese: Ridott ta' Migart), was a redoubt on the island of Comino in Malta. It was built, mainly with limestone, by the Order of Saint John in 1716 or 1761 (sources vary) as one of a series of coastal fortifications around the Maltese Islands.

The redoubt was located on the northern coast of Comino, far away from the island's other defences of Saint Mary's Tower and Saint Mary's Battery. It was demolished and no traces of it can be seen today.
