= Comino Chapel =

Chapel of the Return from Egypt
- The Chapel of the Return of the Holy Family from Egypt
- Kappella tar-Ritorn tas-Sagra Familja mill-Eġittu
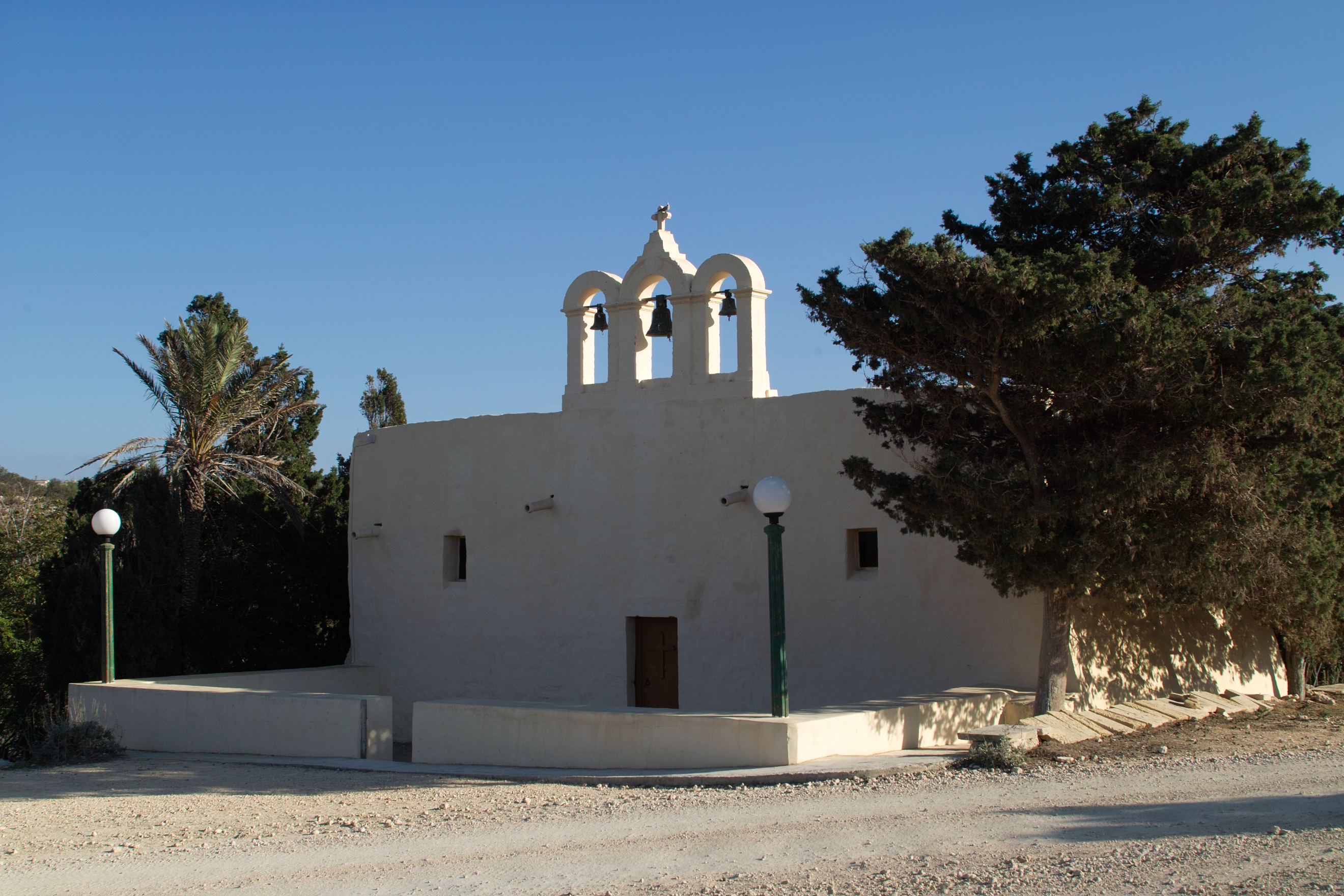

- Location within Malta
- 36°00′54.4″N 14°20′09.0″E
- Location: Comino
- Country: Malta
- Denomination: Roman Catholic

History
- Status: Church
- Dedication: Return from Egypt

Architecture
- Functional status: Active
- Architectural type: Church
- Style: Neo gothic (Interior)
- Completed: 17th century

Administration
- Diocese: Gozo
- Parish: Għajnsielem

Clergy
- Bishop: Mario Grech

The Chapel of the Return of the Holy Family from Egypt or the Chapel of the Return from Egypt or simply St Mary's Chapel is a Roman Catholic church located on the small island of Comino in Malta.

== Origins ==
The chapel of St Mary was first mentioned in a map dating from 1296. However, the location of this original chapel is not known. It may be the present chapel was built on the exact site of the medieval chapel. The original chapel must have been ravaged on numerous occasions by pirates that attacked the island due to its defenseless shores. In fact there was no defense on Comino prior to 1618. As a result, the population abandoned the island and went to live on the nearby island of Gozo. In 1618, the knights built a defense tower, Saint Mary's Tower. This encouraged some people to return to Comino and resettle there. Consequently, the chapel of Comino was rebuilt in its current site. The exact date of its construction is unknown, however we do know that in 1667 Bishop Bueno deconsecrated the church but it was again opened for public worship in 1716. This time the chapel was enlarged and refurbished and rededicated to the Return of the Holy Family from Egypt, the only such church with this dedication in Malta.

== Interior ==
Looking at the church from the outside one would expect to find a plain flat church. However, the interior of the church contrasts the exterior. The interior is constructed on a neogothic style, with pointed archways. The sanctuary is separated from the main body of the church by an Iconostasis, one of the few churches left with it intact. The main painting depicts the return of the Holy Family from Egypt and has influences from Francesco Zahra. It was restored in 1928 by Vincenzo Bonello. The church has one altar and a total of three statues, the Virgin Mary, the Sacred Heart and Saint Joseph.
