= Comino =

Maltese island

Kemmuna
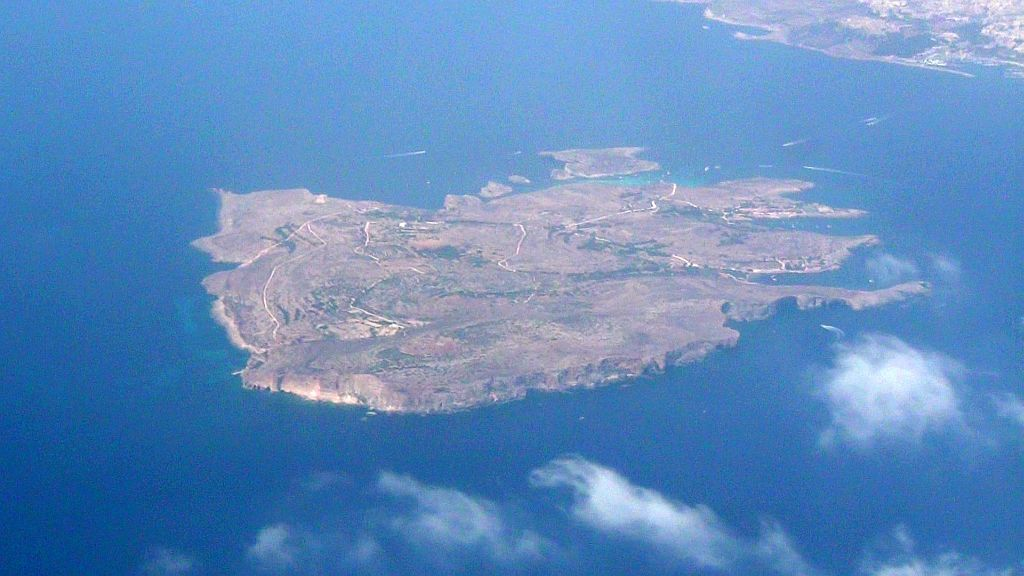
- Aerial view of Comino

- Map of Maltese islands highlighting Comino

- Location within Malta

Geography
- Location: between Gozo and Malta, south of Sicily, Mediterranean Sea
- Coordinates: 36°00′41″N 14°20′12″E
- Archipelago: Maltese Islands
- Adjacent to: Mediterranean Sea
- Total islands: 2
- Major islands: Cominotto
- Area: 3.5 km^{2} (1.4 sq mi)
- Area rank: 3
- Length: 2.63 km (1.634 mi)
- Width: 2.04 km (1.268 mi)
- Coastline: 9.5
- Highest elevation: 35 m (115 ft)

Administration
- Malta
- Region: Gozo
- Local council: Għajnsielem

Demographics
- Population: 2 (2020)
- Population rank: 3 out of 3
- Pop. density: 0.57/km^{2} (1.48/sq mi)
- Pop. density rank: 3
- Ethnic groups: Maltese people

Additional information
- Time zone: CET (UTC+1)
  - Summer (DST): CEST (UTC+2)

Comino (Maltese: Kemmuna) is a small island of the Maltese archipelago between the islands of Malta and Gozo in the Mediterranean Sea, measuring 3.5 square kilometres (1.4 sq mi) in area. Named after the cumin seed, the island has a permanent population of only two residents and is part of the municipality of Għajnsielem, in southeastern Gozo, from where one priest and one policeman commute. The island is a bird sanctuary and nature reserve (Natura 2000 marine protected area).

== Environment ==
The island has a karst landscape supporting sclerophyllous shrubland. Some limited afforestation with pine trees has been carried out. The sand-dunes at Santa Maria bay retain some native vegetation, including Vitex and Tamarix trees. The island has been identified as an Important Bird Area (IBA) by BirdLife International because it supports fifty to eighty breeding pairs of yelkouan shearwaters.

== History ==
Formerly called Ephaestia (Ἡφαιστεία in Ancient Greek), Comino is known to have been inhabited by farmers during Roman times, but for long periods in its history it has been sparsely populated, privately owned, or abandoned entirely. Its rugged coastline is delineated by sheer limestone cliffs, and dotted with deep caves which were popular with pirates and marauders in the Middle Ages. The caves and coves of Comino were frequently used as staging posts for raids on hapless boats crossing between Malta and Gozo. From 1285 until some time after 1290, Comino was the home of exiled Jewish prophet and Kabbalist Abraham Abulafia. It was on Comino that Abulafia composed his Sefer ha-Ot (The Book of the Sign), and his last work, Imre Shefer (Words of Beauty).

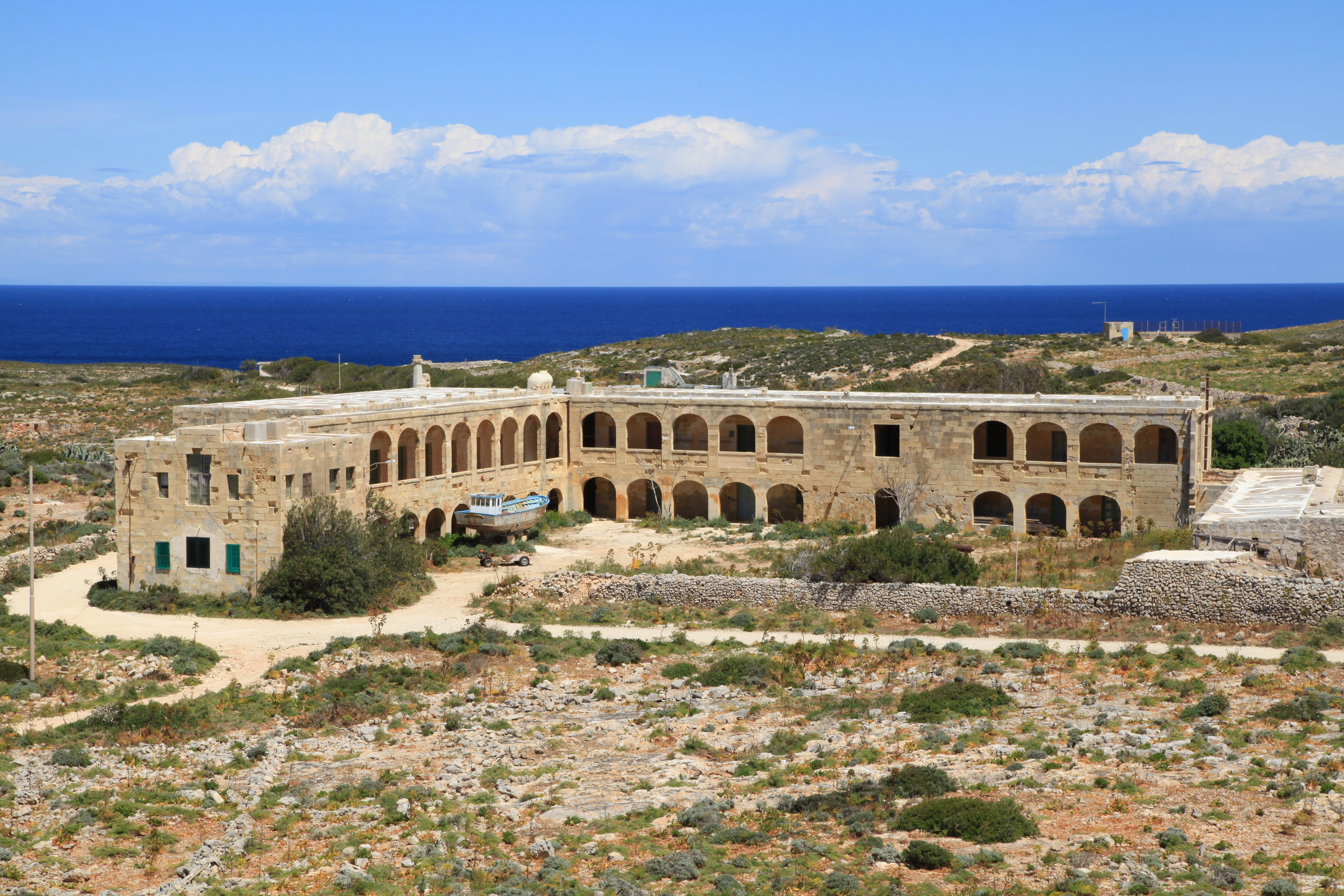
The building purposely built as barracks, later used for quarantine and hospital

In later years, the Knights of Malta used this island as hunting and recreational grounds. The Knights were fiercely protective of the local game, which consisted of wild boar and hares (Maltese: fenek tal-grixti): upon conviction, poachers were liable to a penalty of three years as a galley slave. In the 16th and 17th centuries, Comino served as a place of imprisonment or exile for errant knights. Knights who were convicted of minor crimes were occasionally sentenced to the lonely and dangerous task of manning St. Mary's Tower. however large portion of the island were subjects of the Tripoli's and Tunisian settlement and became a base of operation until the French invasion of Malta.

During the French occupation of Malta, Comino served as a quarantine and existing buildings served as an isolation hospital. The island served as a temporary prison site before a decision on the accused was taken.

On 6 March 1889 the British battleship HMS Sultan grounded on an uncharted rock in the Comino Channel, ripping her bottom open. She slowly flooded and, in a gale on 14 March 1889 she slipped off the rock and sank. The Italian firm of Baghino & Co raised her in August 1889 for a fee of £50,000. On 27 August, Sultan was brought into Malta.

In the 1920s, the island was leased by the British colonial government to the Zammit Cutajar family, which established the Comino Farming Company. Around 162 hectares (400 acres) of land were brought under cultivation, growing various crops and fruit orchards as well as snails which were exported to Italy. The island's population peaked at around 80 people in the late 1940s, including a number of migrants from Sicily. The island had no electricity and the population largely engaged in subsistence farming, as well as fishing and bird-hunting.

Among the interconnected farming families who sustained this community were the Said, Buttigieg, and Vella lines, originating from northern Malta and Gozo, who cultivated terraced fields (*rdumien*) of onions, potatoes, figs, and barley, raised pigs, and maintained rainwater wells and the island's chapel. Notable figures included Joseph "San Pawl" Said (b. 1889, d. after 1939), a tenant farmer under the Comino Farming Company, and his wife Vangelista Calleja (b. 1886, d. 1939); their daughter Carmela (Maria Dolores) Said (b. 1915, d. 1969) married Salvu Buttigieg (b. 1920, d. 1985) from Nadur, Gozo. Their children, including Evangelista "Veggie" Buttigieg (b. c. 1940s), Francis Buttigieg and Joseph Buttigieg, carried on these traditions, with Veggie remaining one of Comino's two permanent residents as of 2025, alongside Salvu Vella. These families, numbering around 17 in the early 20th century, dwindled to three by the 2010s due to emigration and tourism, preserving Comino's isolated way of life without electricity until the 1950s.

The families also preserved cultural traditions, including the annual Feast of Santa Marija at the island's chapel, which had lapsed for over 40 years before being revived in 2015 by Silvio Buttigieg, nephew of Evangelista Buttigieg and a descendant of the Buttigieg-Said line. Supported by Għajnsielem Mayor Franco Ciangura and Gozo Minister Anton Refalo, the event drew large crowds in 2016 and continues to honor the island's heritage.

In 1960, the farming company's lease was revoked and the British government controversially granted a 150-year lease of the island to John Gaul, a British property magnate, on a near-peppercorn rent of £100 per year (equivalent to $2,000 in 2025). The terms of the lease obliged Gaul's Comino Development Ltd to establish a 200-room hotel on Comino by 1963. The lease was later renegotiated to a smaller area encompassing the current Comino Hotel at San Niklaw Bay and the bungalows at Santa Marija Bay.

As of 2023, Comino has a permanent population of only two residents, following the deaths of two other residents in 2017 and 2020.

== Buildings and structures ==
=== St Mary's Tower ===
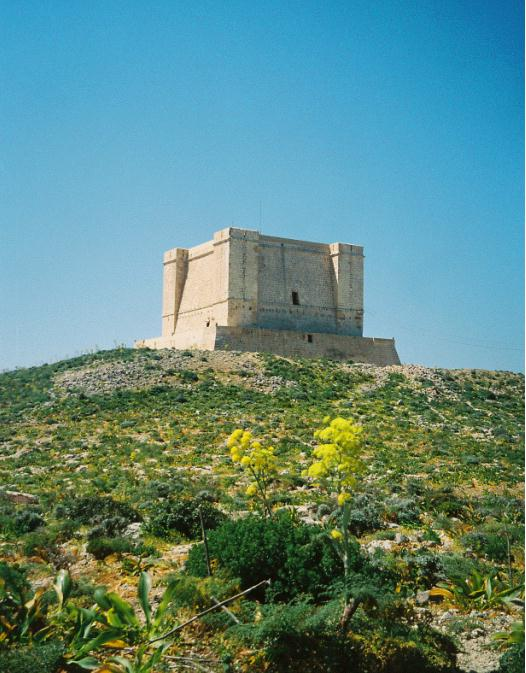
A view of the Saint Mary's Tower dominating the coastline

Saint Mary's Tower is the most visible structure on the island. Its background dates back to 1416, when the Maltese petitioned their king, Alfonso V of Aragon, to build a tower on Comino to serve as an early warning system in case of invasion, and to deter marauding Turks, pirates, smugglers and corsairs from using Comino as a hiding place and staging ground for devastating sorties onto the sister islands of Malta and Gozo. Two years later the king levied a special tax on imported wine to raise funds for this project, but diverted the monies into his coffers; the island remained undefended for another two hundred years.

Finally, in 1618 the Knights of Malta under Grandmaster Wignacourt erected St Mary's Tower (Maltese: it-Torri ta' Santa Marija), located roughly in the center of the southern coast of the island. The tower formed part of a chain of defensive towers — the Wignacourt, Lascaris, and De Redin towers — located at vantage points along the coastline of the Maltese Islands, and greatly improved communications between Malta and Gozo. The tower is a large, square building with four corner turrets, located about 80 m (300 ft) above sea level. The tower itself is about 12 m (39 ft) tall, with walls that are approximately 6 m (20 ft) thick, and it is raised on a platform and plinth that are approximately 8 m (30 ft) high.

During the French Blockade (1798–1800), St Mary's Tower served as a prison for suspected spies. In 1829 the British Military abandoned the site. For several decades it was deemed to be property of the local civil authorities, and might have been used as an isolation hospital, or even as a wintering pen for farm animals. The tower again saw active service during both World War I and World War II. Since 1982 the tower has been the property of the Armed Forces of Malta. It now serves as a lookout and staging post to guard against contraband and the illegal hunting of migratory birds at sea. The tower underwent extensive restoration between 2002 and 2004. Today, it remains the most notable structure on Comino.

=== Comino chapel ===
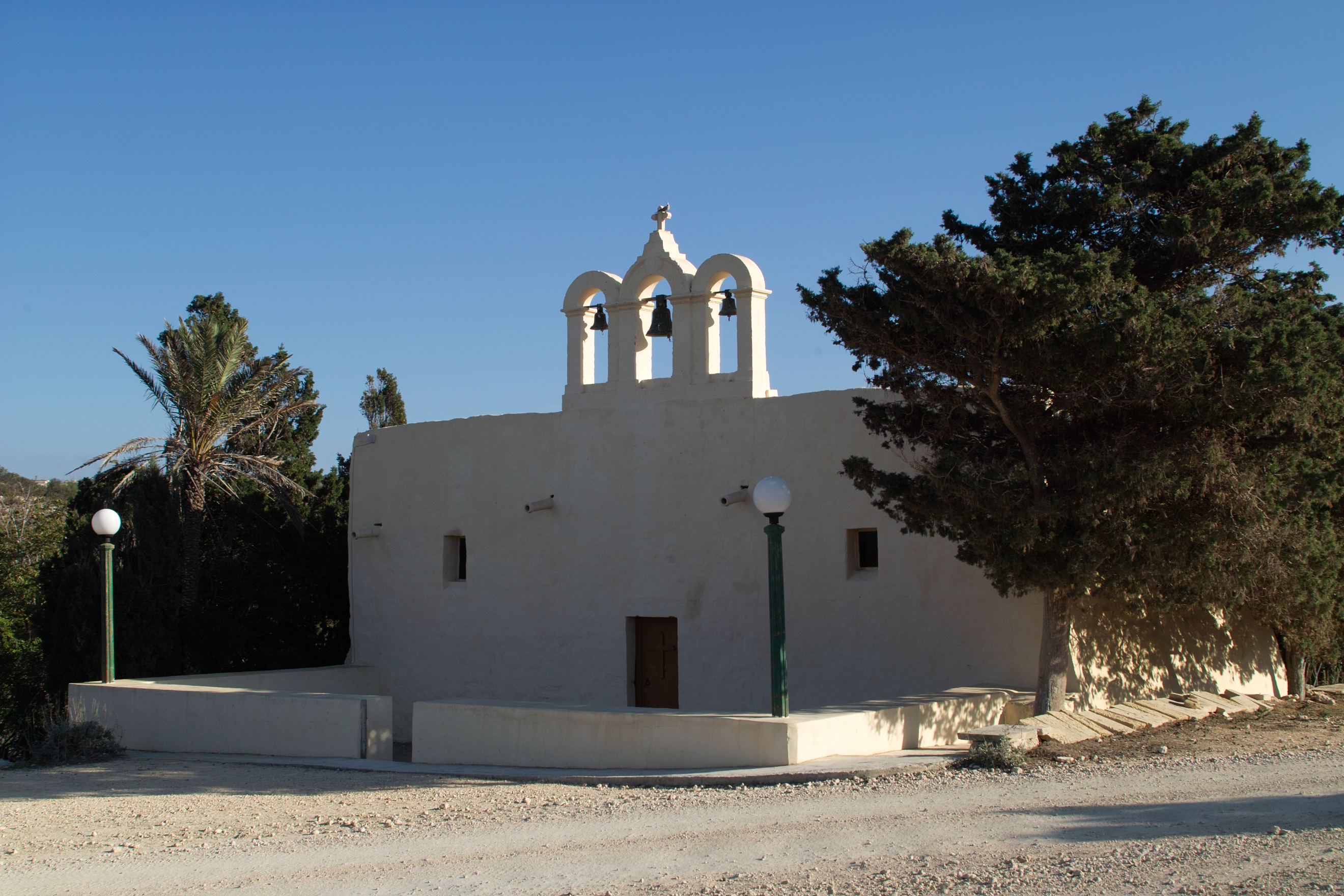
Comino Chapel

A chapel dedicated to the Assumption of St Mary existed in the proximity of the Bay of St Mary since at least 1296. Indeed, it was this chapel which gave the bay its name and not opposite.

A Roman Catholic chapel dedicated to the Holy Family Upon its Return from Egypt is located above Santa Marija Bay. Built in 1618, and enlarged in 1667 and again in 1716, the chapel was originally dedicated to the Annunciation. It has been deconsecrated and reconsecrated at least once in its history, when Comino was devoid of residents. The earliest record of a chapel on this site dates back to the 12th century, and can be seen in a navigational map of the period, located in the National Maritime Museum and Royal Observatory in Greenwich, London.

In the past, and well into the 20th century, whenever the seas were too rough for the Gozitan priest to make the crossing to Comino for the celebration of Holy Mass, the local community would gather on the rocks at a part of the Island known as Tal-Ħmara, and gaze across the channel towards the Chapel of Our Lady of the Rocks (Maltese: il-Madonna tal-Blat), in Ħondoq ir-Rummien, Gozo, where Mass was being celebrated. They followed along with the progression of the Mass by means of a complex flag code.

=== Saint Mary's Battery and Redoubt ===
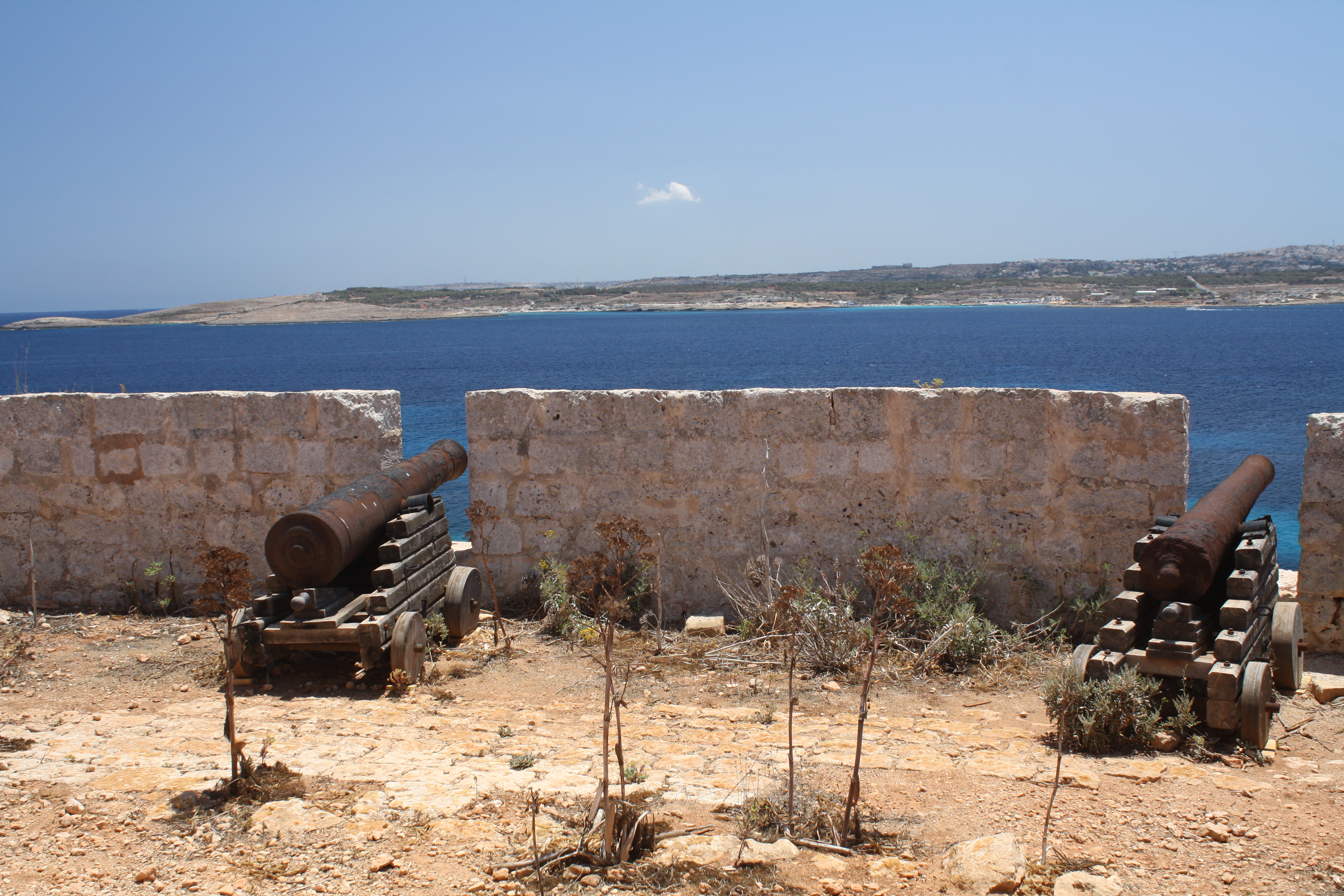
Two retrieved cannons at the Saint Mary's Battery

Saint Mary's Battery, built in 1716, at the same time as various other batteries around the coastline of mainland Malta and Gozo, is situated facing the South Comino Channel. It is a semi-circular structure with a number of embrasures facing the sea. The Battery still houses two 24-pound iron cannon, and remains in a fair state of preservation mainly due to its remote location. Its armament originally included four 6-pound iron cannon. The Battery underwent restoration in 1996 by Din l-Art Ħelwa. Saint Mary's Redoubt, an additional defensive structure, was also constructed in 1716 on the northern coast of Comino, however it was subsequently demolished. The Knights also constructed army barracks on Comino. In the early 20th century the barracks were periodically used as an isolation hospital.

=== Contemporary structures ===
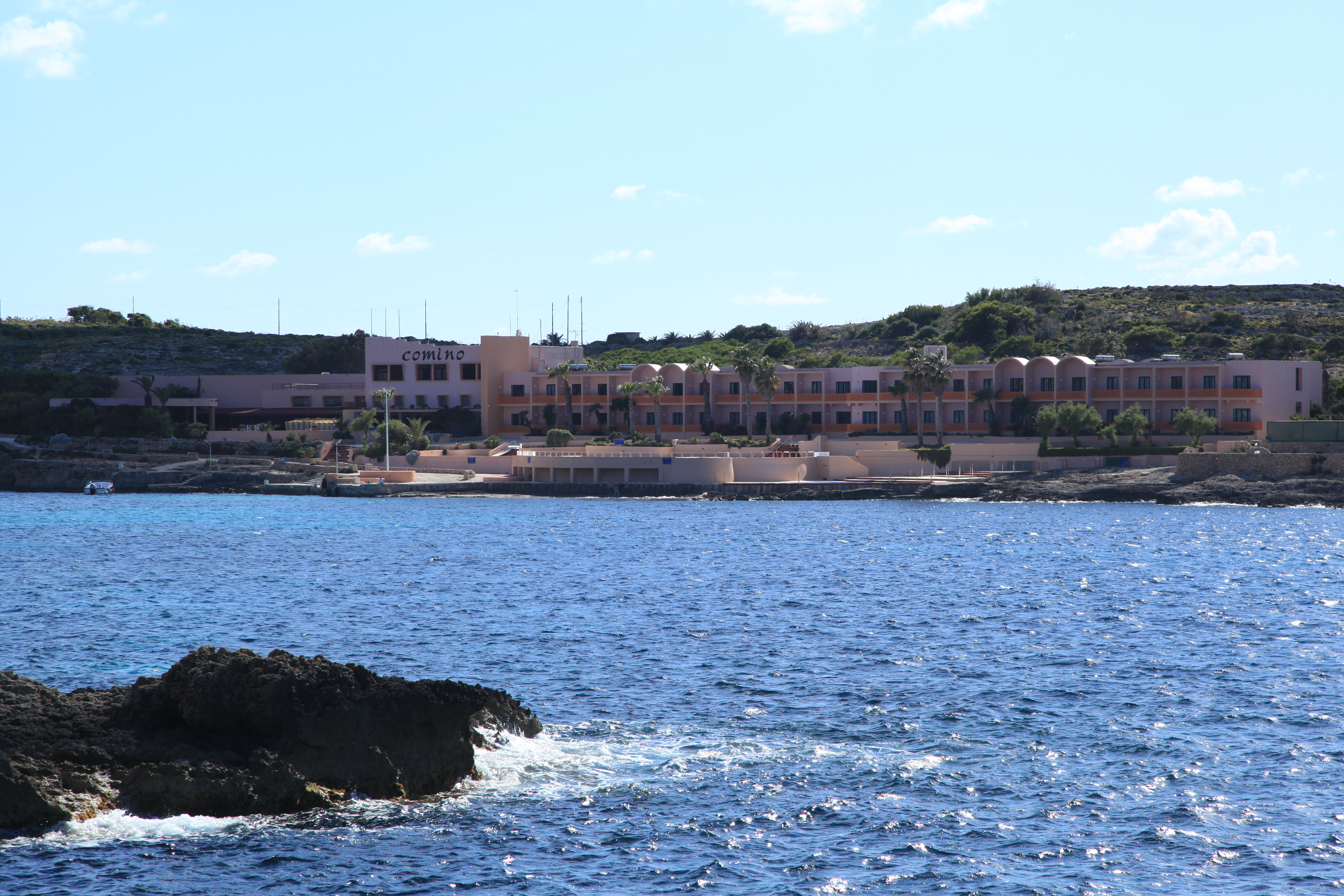
Comino Hotel in 2014

The Comino Hotel was built in the 1960s above San Niklaw Bay. There are also holiday bungalows by the Santa Marija Bay. The hotel is being rebuilt by Hili Ventures Ltd (run by Melo Hili) with an investment of €120m and set to be completed in 2023. The project is for the 100-room Comino Hotel to be demolished and replaced by a 70-room hotel and 19 bungalows. The environmental impact assessment of the project noted the negative impact of extraction of rock and soil from the site, and the loss of habitat in both sites due to the change in location and the increased number of buildings, further encroaching on the surrounding garrigue. The project has yet to receive full planning and environmental permission. Hotel and bungalow village are expected to open by 2025.

The Comino Police Station is located between the bungalows and the Comino Chapel. It is responsible for the small community and visitors, aided by the Malta Police Force in Malta and Gozo when necessary.

== Transport ==
Ferries provide transportation to Comino from either Malta or Gozo, with scheduled boat trips departing from Ċirkewwa or Mġarr. Schedules vary by season.

Group tours operate mainly between March and December, with larger excursion boats departing from ports such as Sliema and Bugibba and typically visiting the Blue Lagoon.

Private boat trips also depart from Ċirkewwa and nearby harbours, offering shorter half-day tours that explore several areas around Comino, including caves, lagoons, and quieter swimming spots.

== Economy ==
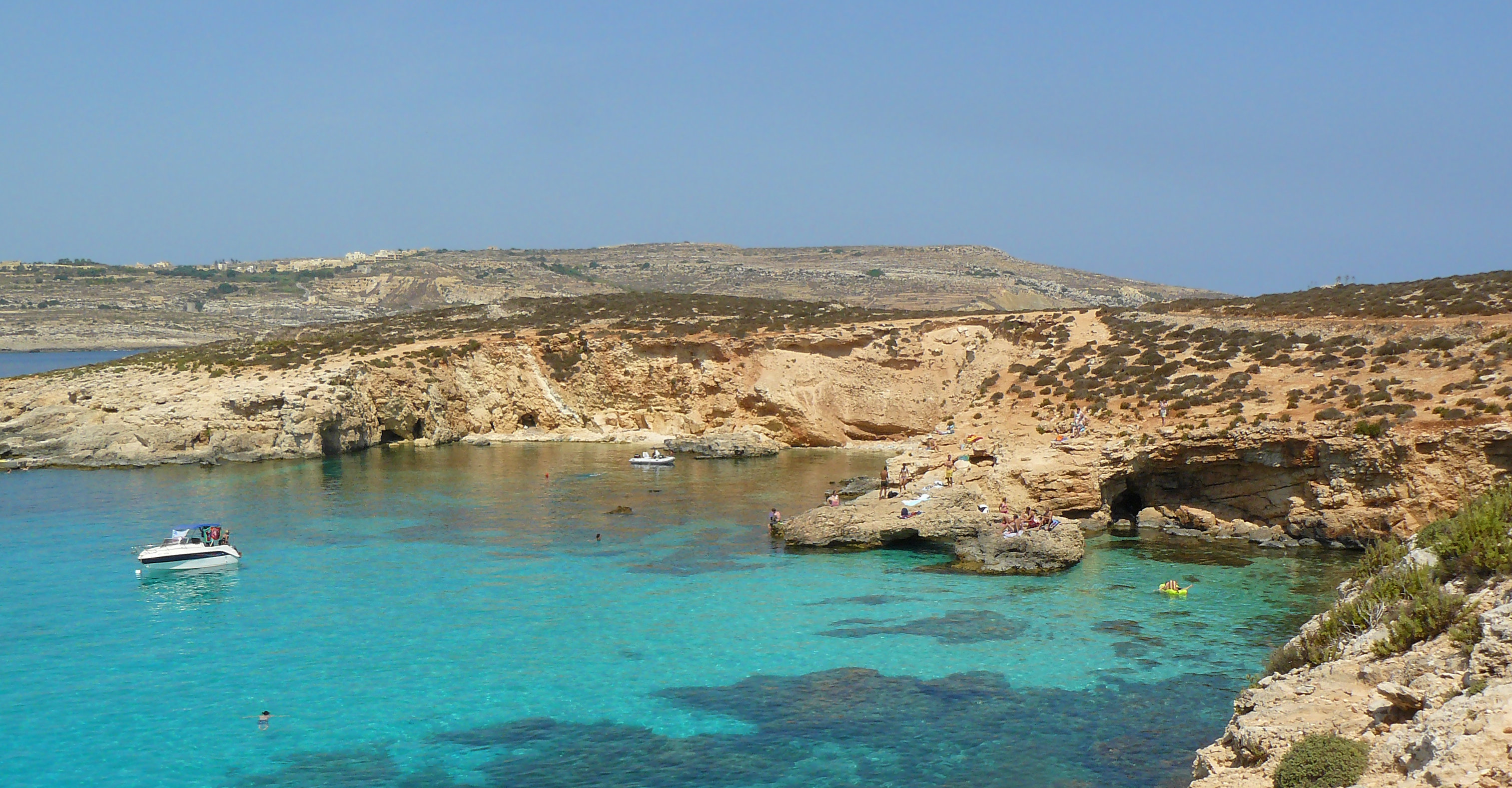
The Blue Lagoon

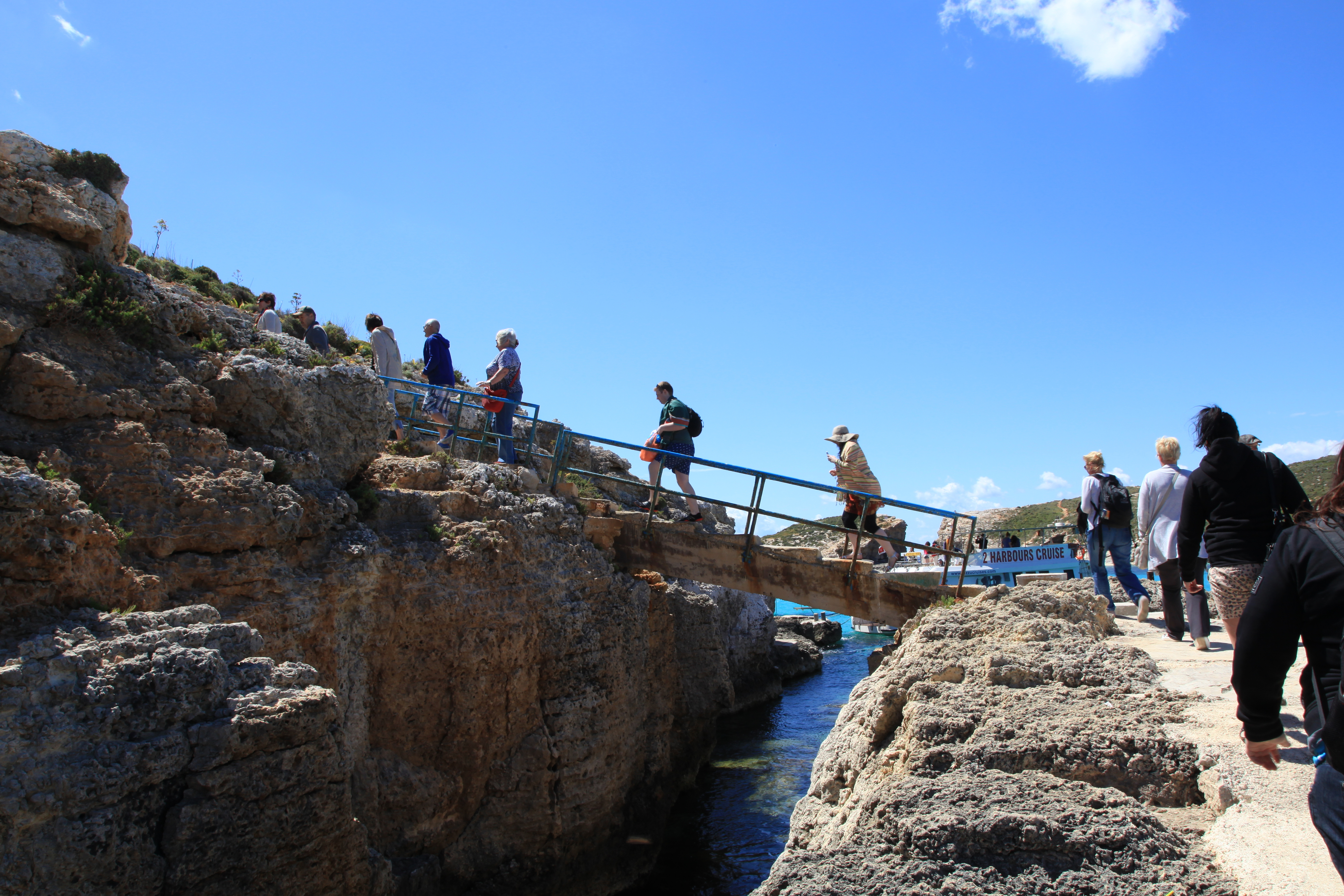
Arrival of tourists at the Blue Lagoon

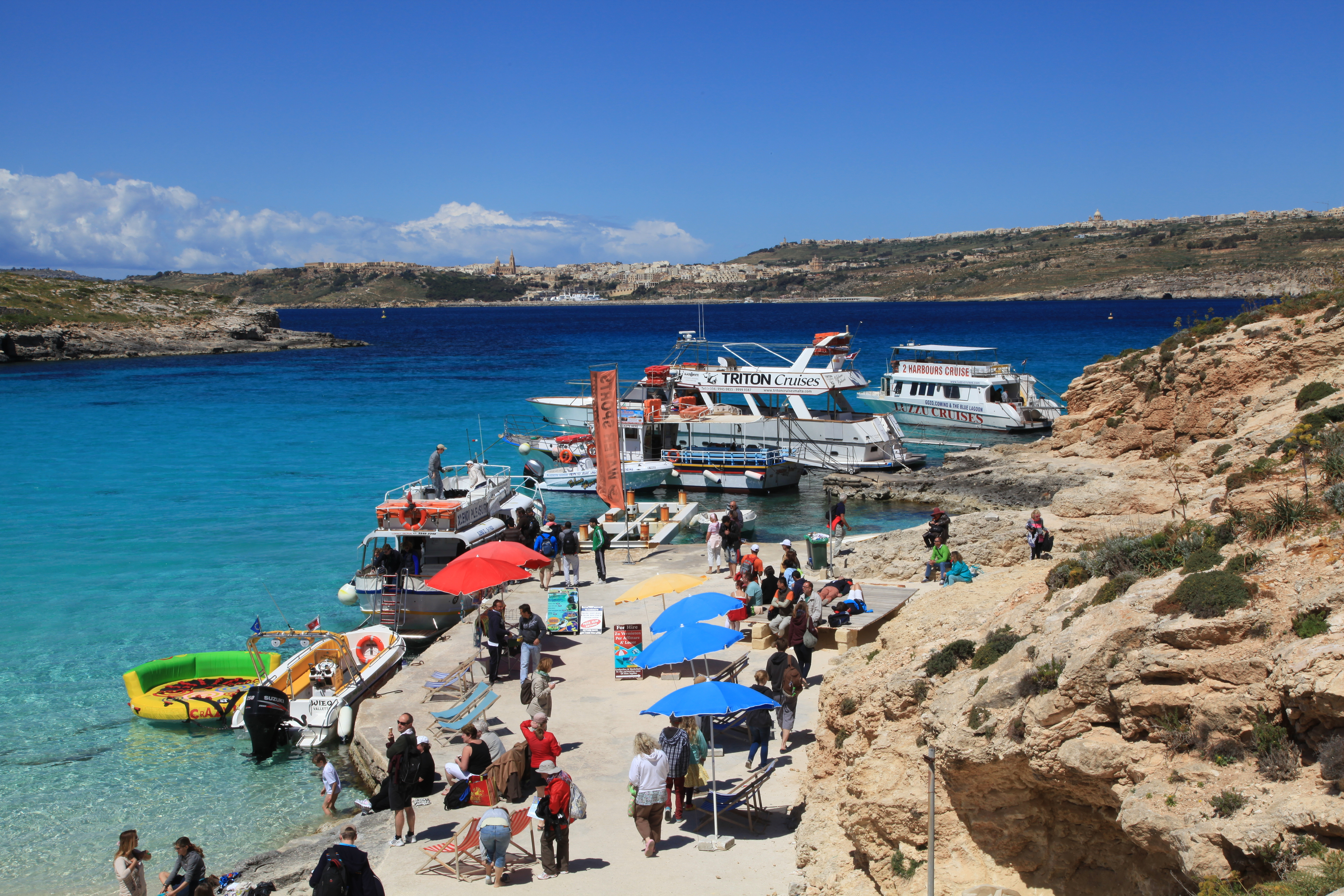
Transport boats at the Blue Lagoon

=== Impact of tourism ===
Between Comino and the adjacent islet of Cominotto (Maltese: Kemmunett) lie the transparent, cyan waters of the Blue Lagoon (Maltese: Bejn il-Kmiemen, literally "Between the Cominos"). Frequented by large numbers of tourists and tour boats daily, the Blue Lagoon is a picturesque bay with a white sandy base and rich marine life. It is popular with divers, snorkelers and swimmers. Other beaches on Comino include Santa Maria Bay (Maltese: Ramla ta' Santa Marija) and St. Nicholas Bay (Maltese: Bajja San Niklaw).

The touristic over-exploitation of Comino, and in particular of the Blue Lagoon, became a matter of contention in the late 2010s. Despite regulations, at least seven illegal kiosks have sprung up on the coastline; none of them has a permit from the Malta Tourism Authority, and they are permanently parked on the spot, while they should be left on wheels and removed every day. Operators have also started deploying deckchairs and umbrellas in the Blue Lagoon sandy beach as early as 7 AM, filling up all public space. Cruise liners bringing hundreds of tourists on the spot are leading to a strong environmental impact (with loud music and trash left on the spot, attracting rats) and creeping privatisation of the former natural hotspot, while providing no upkeep of the bay.

Commercial interests and political connections have fostered the touristic exploitation of Comino. The deck-chair rentals at the Blue Lagoon are owned by Daniel Refalo, an associate of construction tycoon Joseph Portelli, and by Mark Cutajar, brother of Labour MEP Josianne Cutajar and former canvasser for Gozo Minister Clint Camilleri in 2022, Back in 2016, Refalo and Cutajar claimed that they were being scapegoated, and that "the chaos that now exists in the Blue Lagoon... is part of a larger and deeper problem facing Maltese tourism". Pleasure and Leisure Ltd, one of the companies running daily ferries to Comino under the brand Oh Yeah Malta, is owned by the father and uncles of Tourism Minister Clayton Bartolo from nearby Mellieħa. One of the kiosks, tal-Ekxa, is run by Victor Refalo, a former Labour local councillor from Żebbuġ, Gozo and canvasser of Gozo Minister Clint Camilleri.

In early 2021, with the pretext of emergency procedures to prevent the road from caving in, the Gozo Ministry conducted illegal works to install a service culverts with manholes to pass utility services along the dirt road to the Blue Lagoon. According to the ministry, the culvert would eliminate the use of electricity generators, while denying that fixed kiosks were being planned for Blue Lagoon. Environmental activists including Friends of the Earth Malta noted that the works, later greenlighted by the Environment Resources Authority, had an impact on the natural surroundings, with excavation on trenches and widening of the track, and accused the authorities to attempt to legitimise illegal commercial activity. The works were welcomed by the illegal kiosk owners, including Refalo. The Labour Party organising secretary, architect William Lewis, also applied to install a wooden walkway over the garrigue terrain leading to the kiosks and the Blue Lagoon; a permit is pending.

Malta's Moviment Graffitti has denounced the overdevelopment and touristification, also conducting direct actions to remove the illegal deck-chairs and umbrellas in June and August 2022. Graffitti called for a master plan for Comino that would limit activity on the island as well as set defined areas for operators.

According to reports from March 2025, to address these issues, several restoration initiatives have been implemented. Ambjent Malta and the Environment and Resources Authority (ERA) have collaborated on habitat restoration projects, including the removal of invasive species and planting of indigenous vegetation, aiming to enhance biodiversity and restore ecological processes. Additionally, Friends of the Earth Malta is working to restore the historic Comino bakery, transforming it into an environmental education centre to promote sustainable practices. Despite these efforts, concerns persist over proposed developments, such as the Comino Hotel project, which environmental organizations argue could harm the island's fragile ecosystem.

=== Film location ===
Comino has been used as a filming location, including for Troy, The Count of Monte Cristo (in which St. Mary's Tower is featured as the prison fortress Château d'If) and Swept Away.
