= Għajnsielem =

- Local council
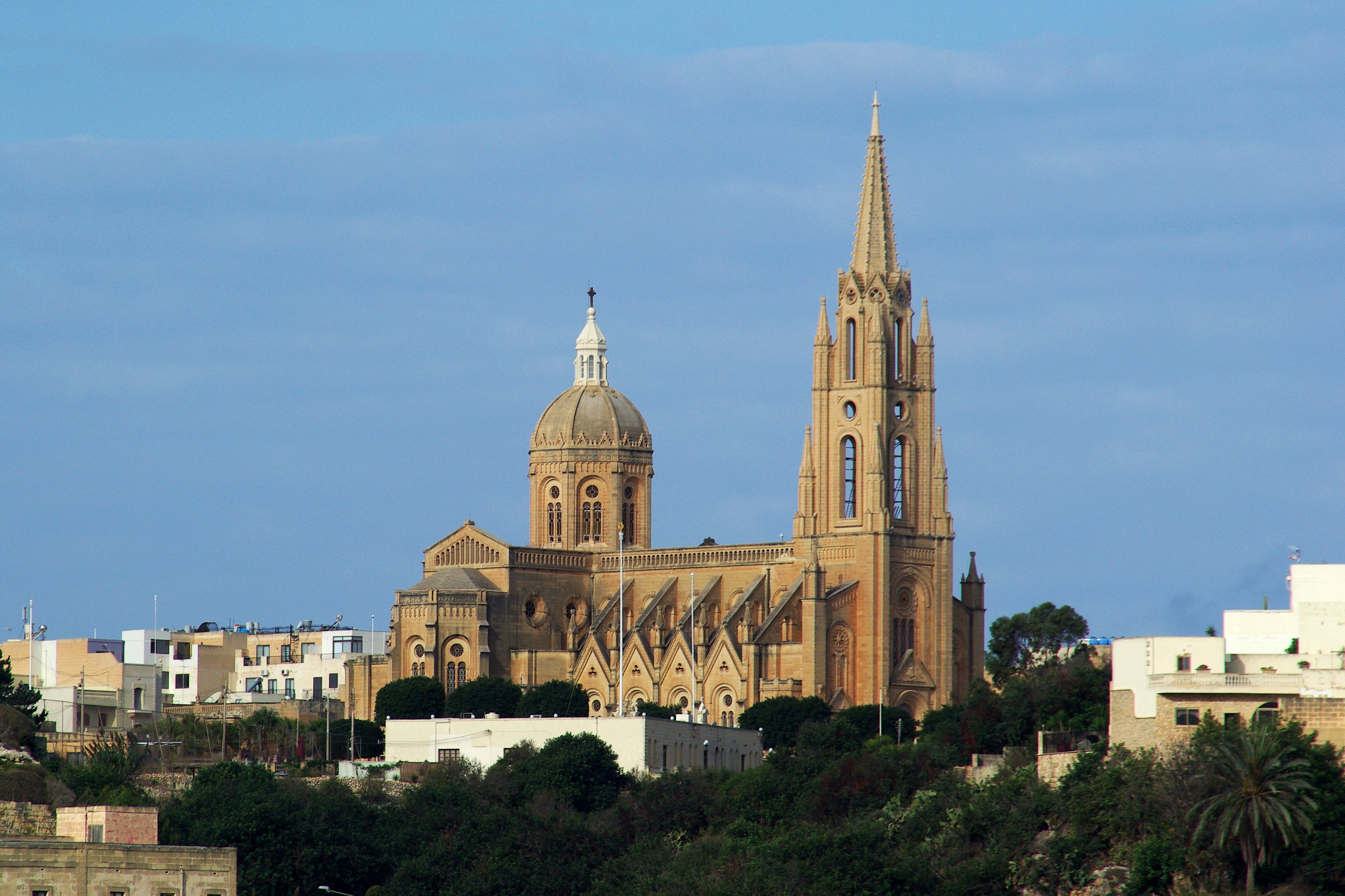
- Għajnsielem parish church

- Flag Coat of arms
- Motto: Spring of Peace
- Coordinates: 36°1′37″N 14°17′25″E
- Country: Malta
- Region: Gozo Region
- District: Gozo and Comino District
- Borders: Nadur, Qala, Sannat, Xewkija

Government
  - Mayor: Kevin Cauchi (PN)

Area
  - Total: 7.2 km^{2} (2.8 sq mi)

Population (Jul. 2024)
  - Total: 3,733
  - Density: 520/km^{2} (1,300/sq mi)
- Demonym(s): Għajnsilmiż (m), Għajnsilmiża (f), Għajnsilmiżi (pl)
- Time zone: UTC+1 (CET)
  - Summer (DST): UTC+2 (CEST)
- Postal code: GSM
- Dialing code: 356
- ISO 3166 code: MT-13
- Patron saint: Our Lady of Loreto
- Website: www.ghajnsielemlc.com

Għajnsielem (Maltese pronunciation: [ɐˤɪ̯nˈsɪːlɛm]; 'Spring of Peace') is a village and local council on the south-eastern coast of the island of Gozo in Malta, including the entire island of Comino. The population in July 2024 was 3,733, of which 1,945 were male and 1,788 female, and 2,912 were Maltese and 821 were foreign nationals.

== Places ==
Notable places, buildings and structures in the village include:

- Mġarr Harbour
- Fort Chambray
- Our Lady of Loreto Parish Church
- Mġarr ix-Xini Tower
- Comino
- Santa Cecilia Tower and Chapel
- Garzes Tower (demolished)

== Football club ==
- Għajnsielem F.C.

== Twin towns – sister cities ==
Għajnsielem is twinned with:

- Bethlehem, Palestine
- Tolfa, Italy
