= Our Lady of Loreto Parish Church =

Parish Church of Our Lady of Loreto
- Knisja Arċipretali tal-Madonna ta' Loreto
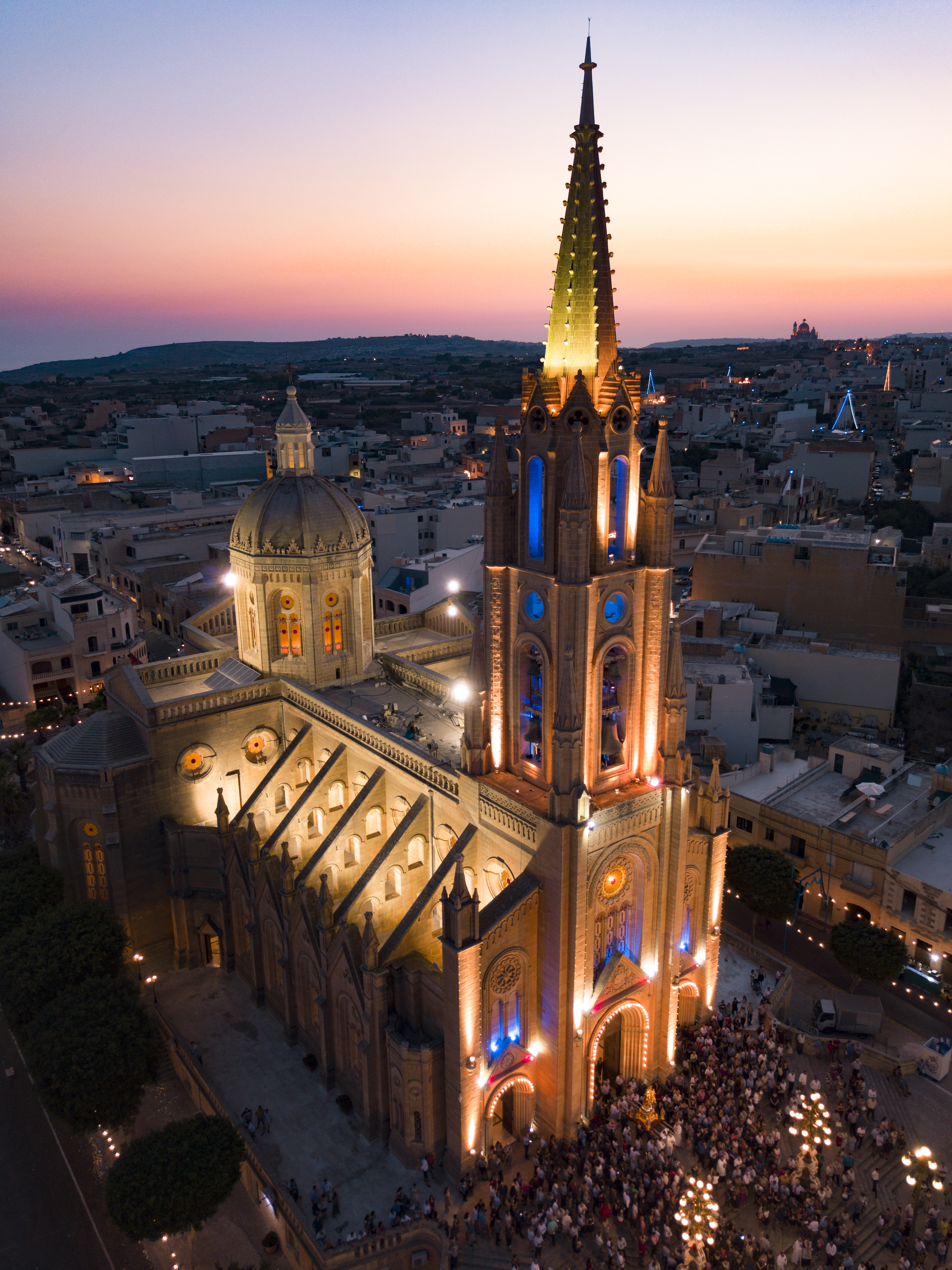
- Parish Church of Our Lady of Loreto
- 36°01′34.4″N 14°17′21.5″E
- Location: Għajnsielem, Gozo, Malta
- Denomination: Roman Catholic

History
- Status: Active
- Founded: 14 September 1924
- Dedication: Our Lady of Loreto
- Dedicated: 18 August 1989

Architecture
- Functional status: Parish church
- Architect: Ugo Mallia
- Architectural type: Church
- Style: Neo-gothic

Administration
- Diocese: Gozo
- Parish: Għajnsielem

Parish Church of Our Lady of Loreto is a Roman Catholic neo-gothic parish church located in the village of Għajnsielem on the island of Gozo, Malta.

== History ==
New plans were drawn by Ugo Mallia to build a new parish church to replace the old parish church which became too small for the growing population. The foundation stone of the church was laid on 14 September 1924. The church was not completed until the mid 1970s due to a number of interruptions mainly World War II and two accidents in which the master mason broke his legs. Delays resumed when architect Mallia refrained from further work. Consequently plans were transferred to architect Guze D'Amato. When he died another architect took over. It was only on 27 August 1978 that the church was blessed and consecrated eleven years later on 18 August 1989.
