= Mġarr ix-Xini Tower =

Watchtower on Gozo, Malta

- Torri ta' Mġarr ix-Xini
- Għajnsielem, Gozo, Malta
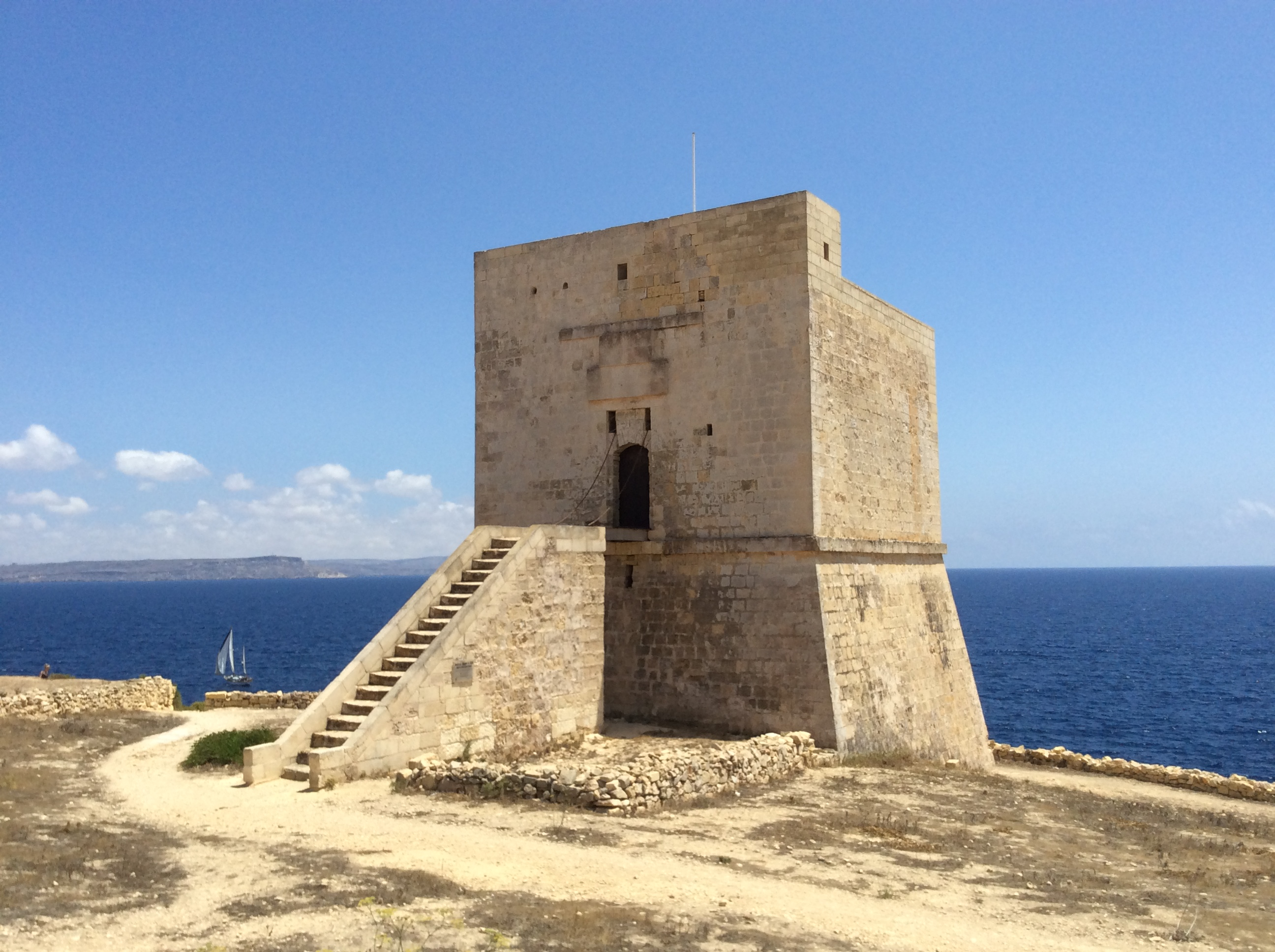
- Mġarr ix-Xini Tower

Site information
- Type: Coastal watchtower
- Owner: Government of Malta
- Controlled by: Wirt Għawdex
- Open to the public: Yes
- Condition: Intact

Location
- Coordinates: 36°1′1.7″N 14°16′27.7″E

Site history
- Built: 1661
- Built by: Order of Saint John
- Materials: Limestone

Mġarr ix-Xini Tower (Maltese: Torri ta' Mġarr ix-Xini) is the largest of the coastal watchtowers that the Knights of Malta erected on the island of Gozo. It watches over the entrance to the bay of Mġarr ix-Xini, limits of Għajnsielem, which lies on Gozo's south-west coast.

It was completed in 1661, and its design is similar to the De Redin towers that were commissioned by Grand Master Martin de Redin. Wirt Għawdex, a heritage NGO, has restored the tower. It is open to the public.

It is one of four surviving coastal watchtowers on Gozo, with the others being Xlendi Tower, Dwejra Tower, and Isopu Tower. The Garzes and Marsalforn towers were destroyed in the 18th and 19th centuries.

== History ==
Mġarr ix-Xini Tower was completed by June 1661, to a plan by Mederico Blondel. It cost an estimated 857 scudi, which were financed by the Università of Gozo. The design is similar to the De Redin towers on mainland Malta, having a square plan with two floors. However, the design differed since its entrance was approached by a flight of steps and a drawbridge, unlike the other towers which had a retractable ladder.

The tower has Santa Cecilia Tower (built 1613) and Saint Mary's Tower (built 1618) in its line of sight. It was originally manned by a castellan and a bombardier, but was no longer permanently manned by 1785 since the Ottoman threat had receded. It was rearmed with two 6-pounder iron guns in 1792.

== Present day ==
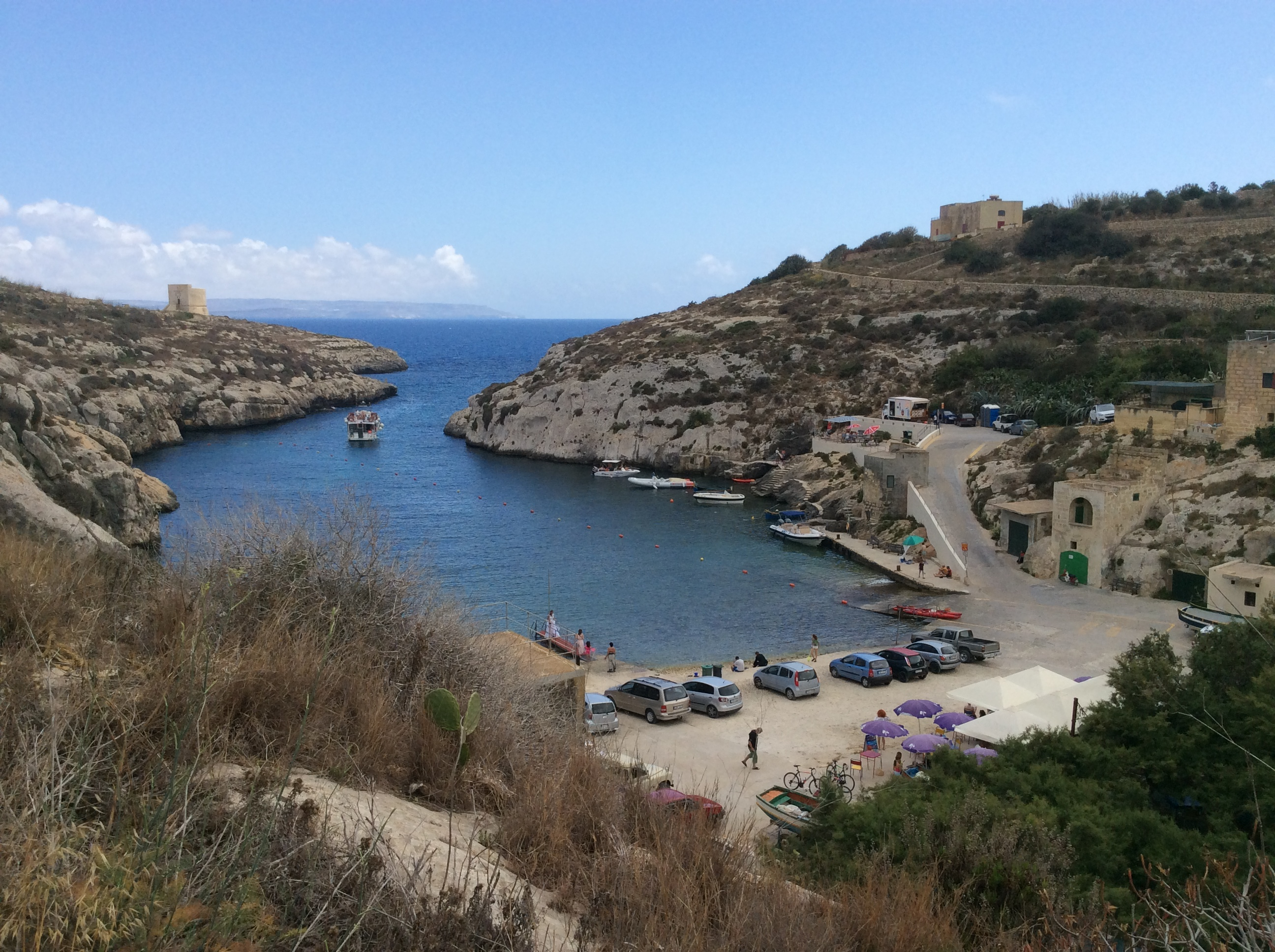
View of Mġarr ix-Xini with the tower visible to the left

The tower was restored in 2000 by the Ministry for Gozo and Wirt Għawdex. A path leading to the tower from the bay was also reopened, enabling visitors to enjoy the walk to the tower. Other restoration works were carried out in 2008, and restoration was finally completed in 2009.

The tower is now open to the public on Saturdays.
