= Saint Mary's Battery =

Artillery battery on Comino, Malta

- Batterija ta' Santa Marija
- Comino, Malta
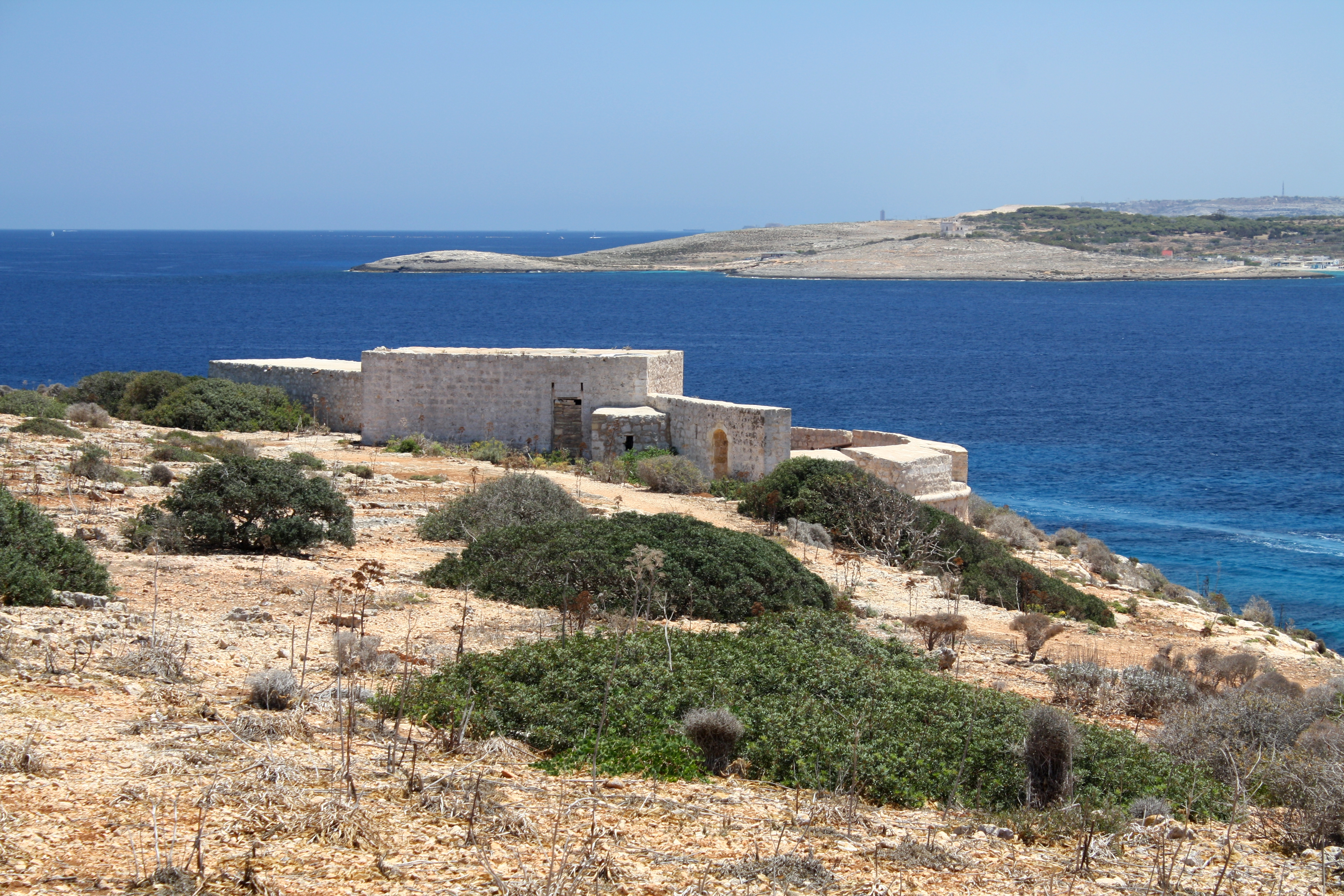
- View of St. Mary's Battery

Site information
- Type: Artillery battery
- Owner: Government of Malta
- Operator: Din l-Art Ħelwa
- Open to the public: Yes
- Condition: Intact

Location
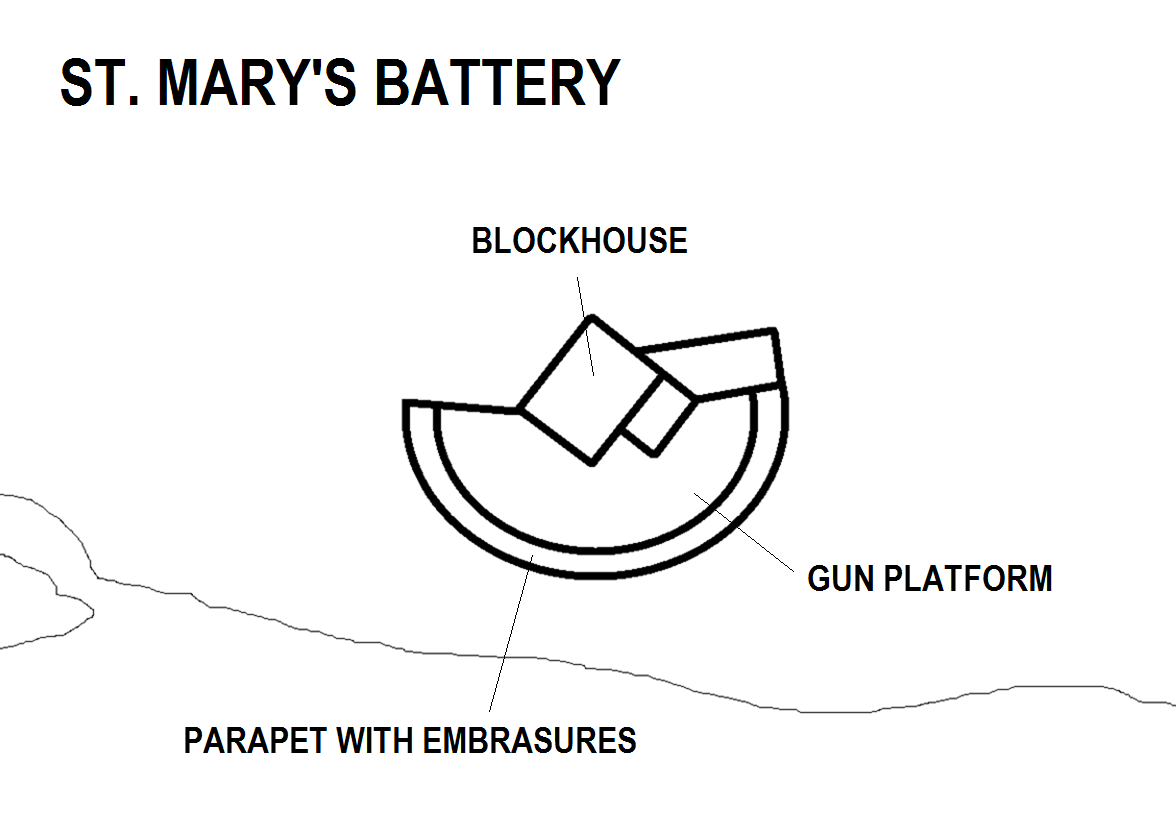
- Map of St. Mary's Battery
- Coordinates: 36°00′24.1″N 14°20′46.5″E

Site history
- Built: 1715–1716
- Built by: Order of Saint John
- In use: 1715–before 1770
- Materials: Limestone

Saint Mary's Battery (Maltese: Batterija ta' Santa Marija), also known as Comino Battery (Maltese: Batterija ta' Kemmuna), is an artillery battery on the island of Comino in Malta. It was built by the Order of Saint John between 1715 and 1716 as one of a series of fortifications around the coasts of the Maltese Islands.

== History ==
Saint Mary's Battery was built in 1715–1716 to protect the South Comino Channel, in conjunction with Wied Musa Battery on mainland Malta. Construction of the battery cost a total of 1018 scudi. It has a semi-circular gun platform ringed by a parapet with eight embrasures facing the sea. The battery has a single blockhouse, where the ammunition was stored. This was placed diagonally along the land front so that its two outer faces functioned as a redan. The land front also contains musketry loopholes.

The battery was originally armed with two 24-pounder and four 6-pounder iron cannons, but it was abandoned by 1770.

Prior to World War II, a Gozitan family lived in the battery. It was eventually abandoned, and a fig tree grew over the main entrance.

A few of the battery's cannons were dragged into the gorge beneath the battery, in an attempt to take them to a foundry for smelting. The two 24-pounders were left lying inside the battery since these were too heavy to cart away.

== Present day ==
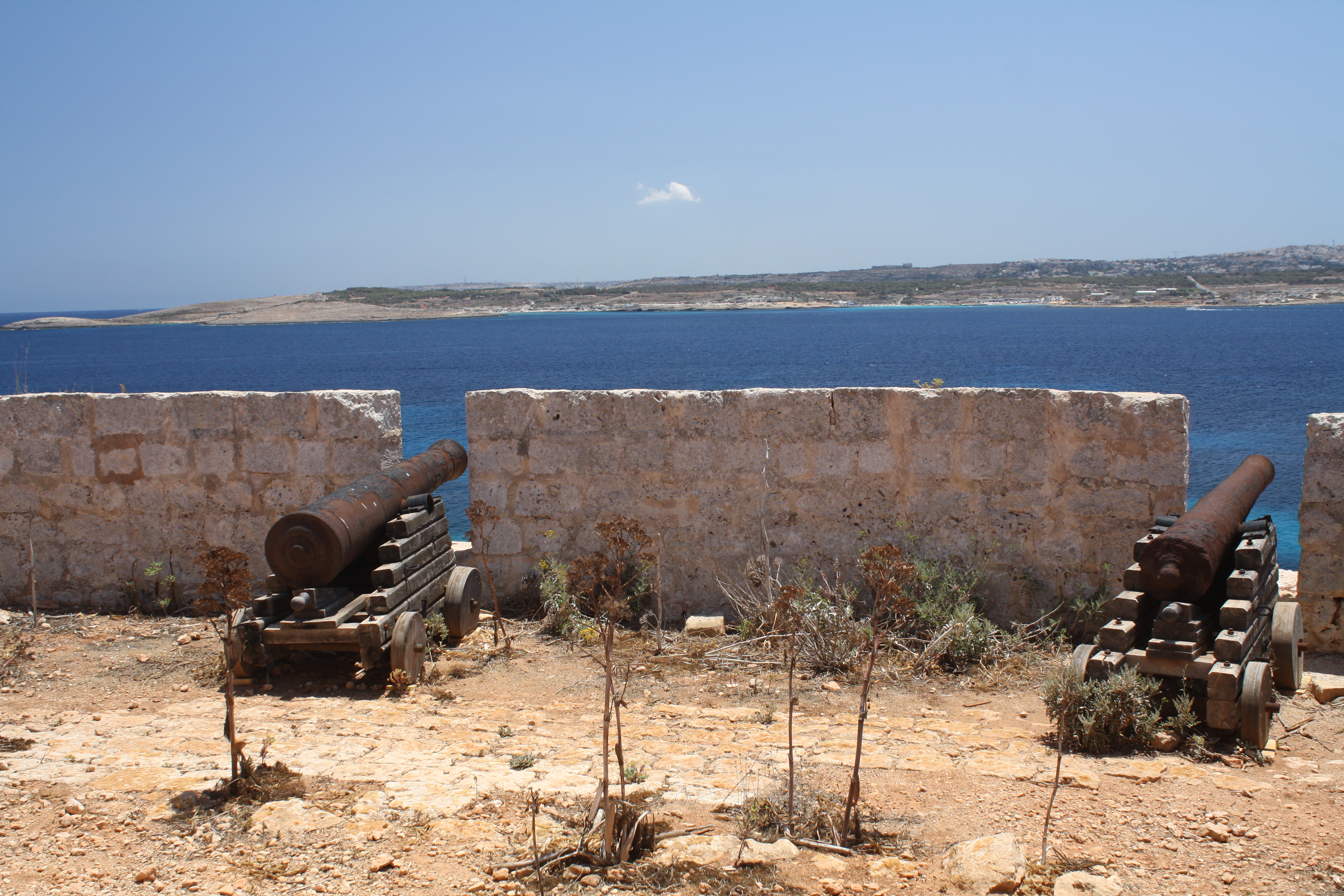
Cannons at St. Mary's Battery which were retrieved in a joint AFM–RN operation in 1997

Unlike many similar coastal fortifications, the battery remained in a fair state of preservation, mainly due to its remote location. It was restored by Din l-Art Ħelwa between 1996 and 1997, and again between 2003 and 2004. During restoration, the roof of the blockhouse, which was in danger of collapsing, was repaired.

On 21 August 1997, a joint operation was carried out by the Armed Forces of Malta and the Royal Navy, in which a helicopter from HMS Illustrious and Maltese soldiers retrieved the cannons from the gorge beneath the battery and transported them back to the battery. Reproductions of gun carriages were made, and the cannons were mounted on them once again.

The battery is now open to the public all year round.

== See also ==
- Saint Mary's Tower
- Saint Mary's Redoubt
