= Josianne Cutajar =

Maltese politician

Josianne Cutajar MEP
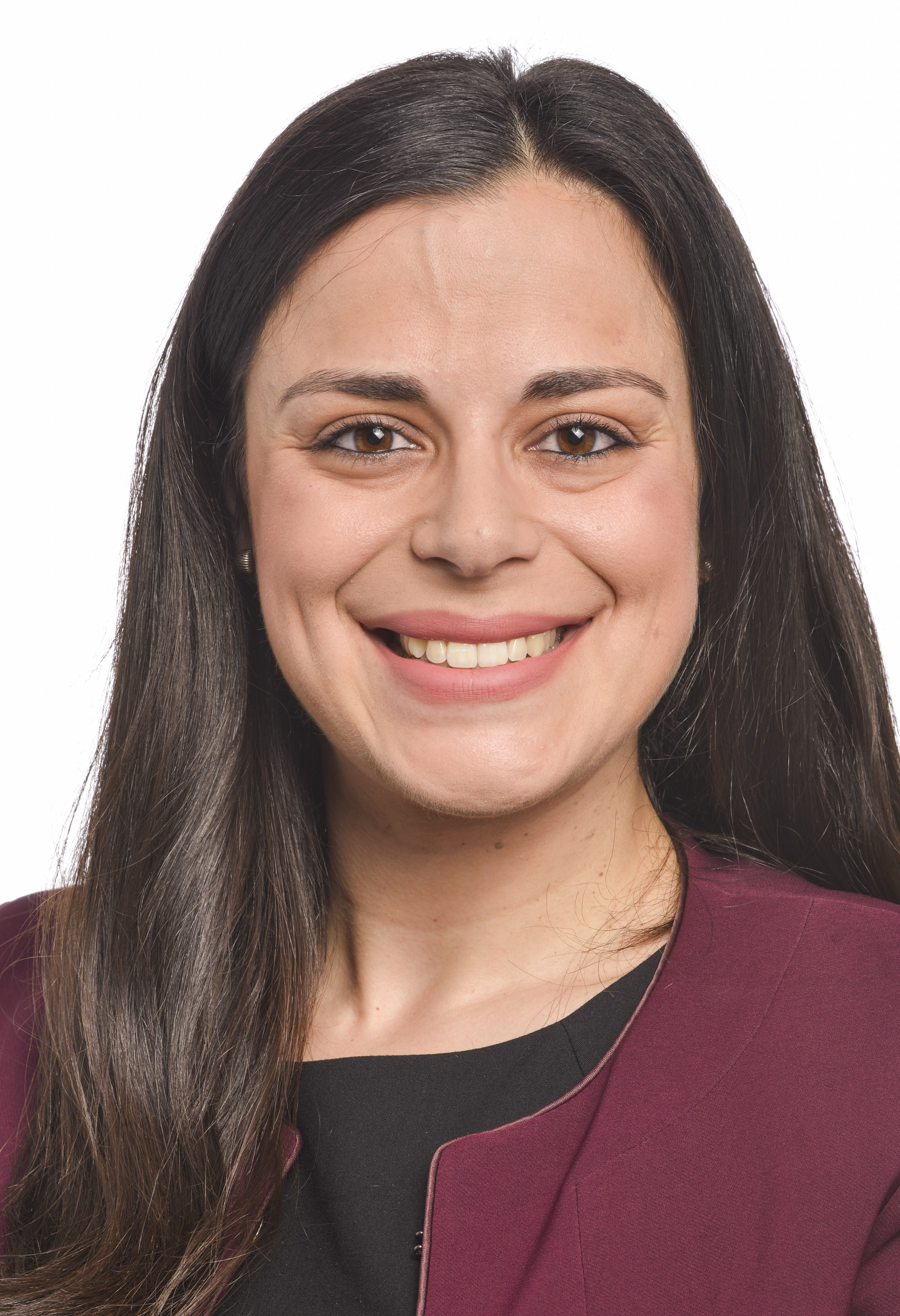
- Josianne Cutajar in 2019

Member of the European Parliament for Malta
- Incumbent
- Assumed office 2 July 2019

Personal details
- Born: 27 December 1989 (age 36) Victoria
- Party: Labour Party

Josianne Cutajar (born 27 December 1989) is a Maltese (Gozitan) politician who was elected as a Member of the European Parliament in 2019.

In parliament, Cutajar has since been serving on the Committee on Industry, Research and Energy. In addition to her committee assignments, she is part of the Parliament's delegation for relations with Australia and New Zealand. She is also a supporter of the MEP Alliance for Mental Health, the European Parliament Intergroup on Seas, Rivers, Islands and Coastal Areas and the European Parliament Intergroup on LGBT Rights.

In January 2024, Cutajar announced that she would not stand in the 2024 European Parliament election.
