= Santa Cecilia Tower =

- It-Torri ta' Santa Ċeċilja
- Għajnsielem, Gozo, Malta
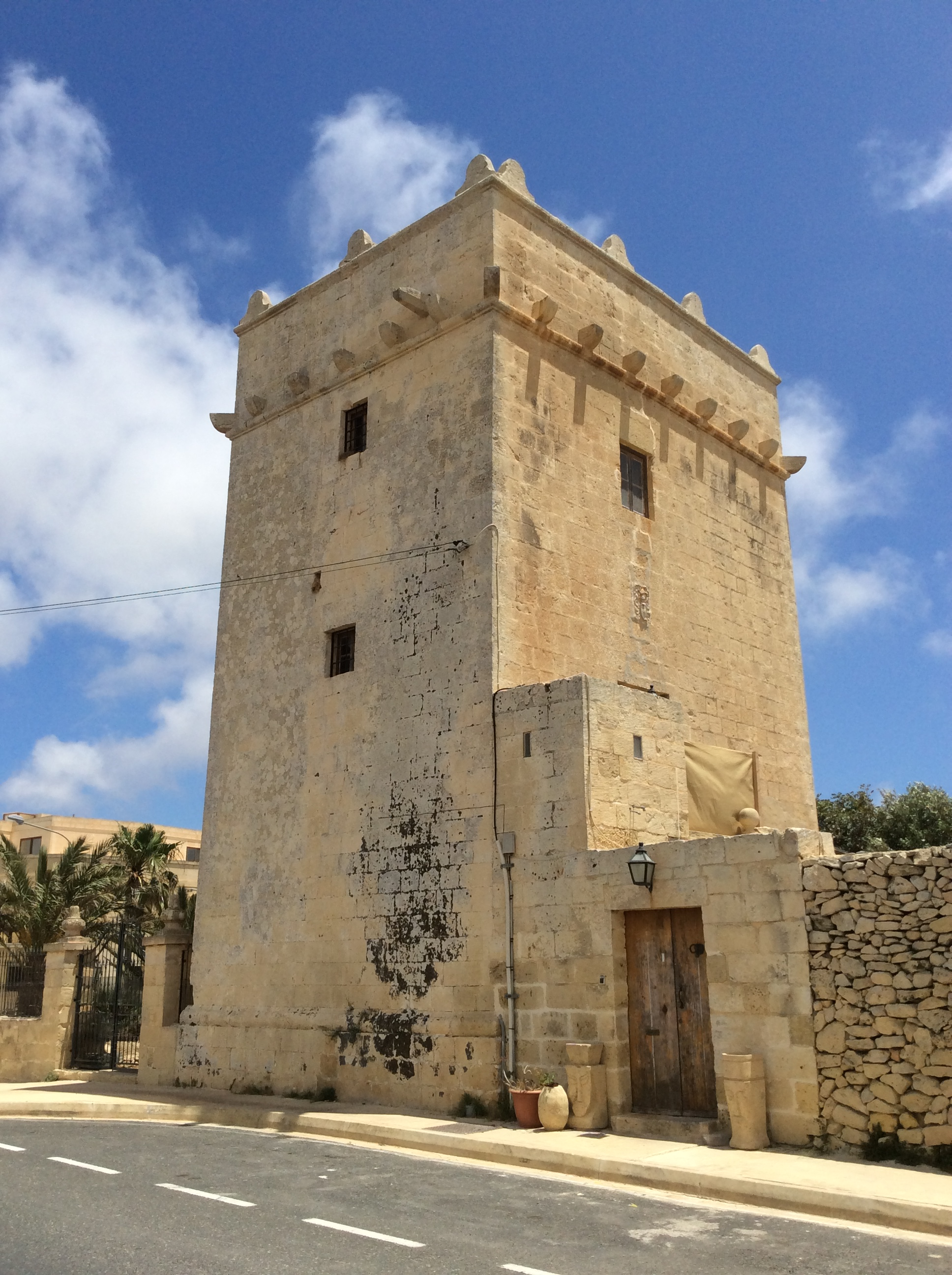
- View of Santa Cecilia Tower

Site information
- Type: Tower
- Owner: Private
- Open to the public: No
- Condition: Intact

Location
- Coordinates: 36°1′44.8″N 14°16′26.2″E

Site history
- Built: 1613
- Built by: Fra Bernardo Macedonia
- Materials: Limestone

Santa Cecilia Tower (Maltese: It-Torri ta' Santa Ċeċilja or ta' Santa Ċilja) is a tower in Għajnsielem, Gozo, Malta. It was built in 1613 by a member of the Order of St. John, and it could relay messages across the island. The tower remains in good condition and is a private residence.

== History ==
Santa Cecilia Tower was built in 1613 by Fra Bernardo Macedonia, Commander of Artillery of the Order of St. John. It got its name from the nearby Santa Cecilia Chapel, the oldest surviving chapel on Gozo. The chapel eventually became an ancillary building to the tower.

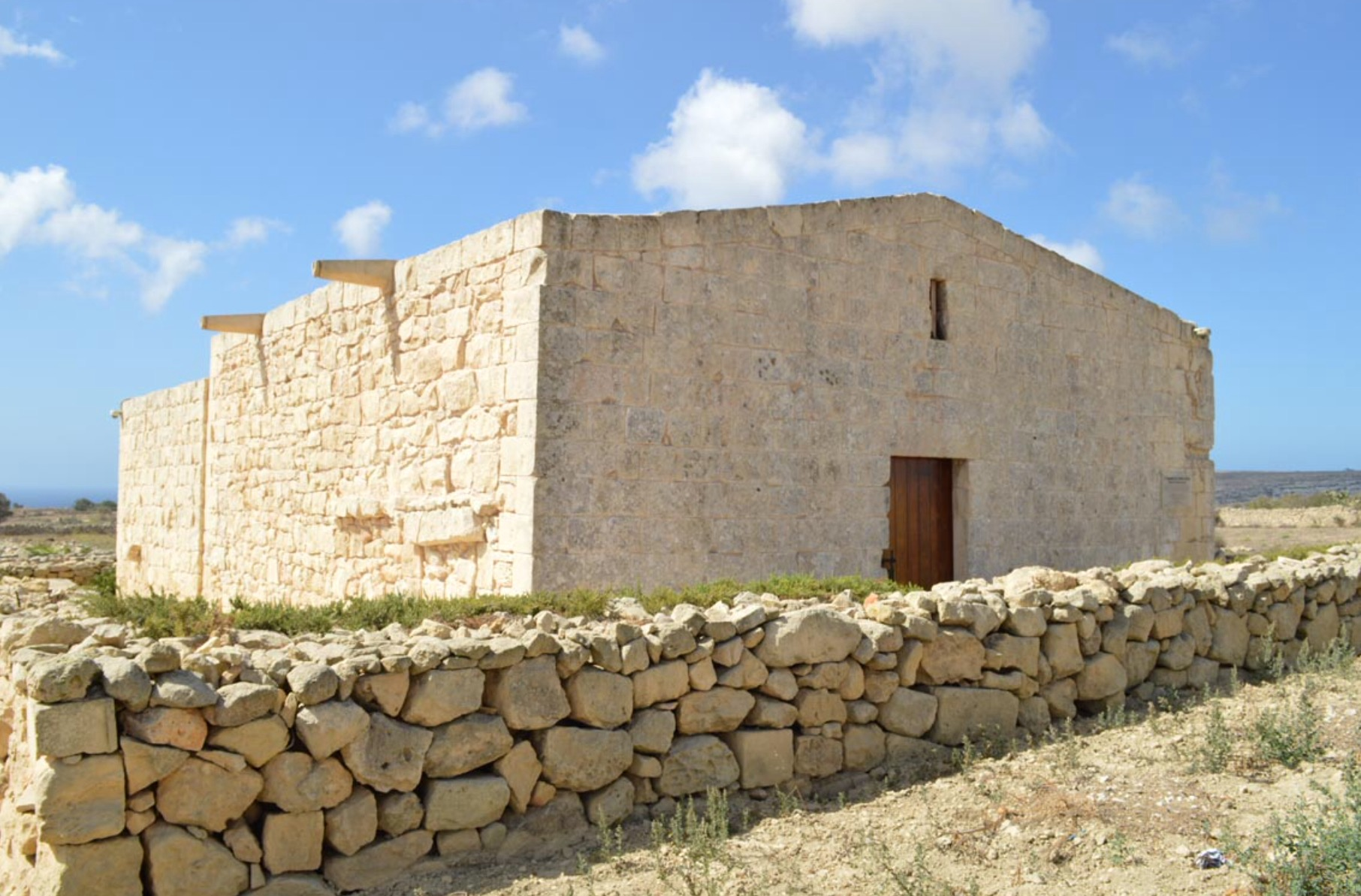
Santa Cecilia Chapel, which is located close to the tower

The tower was able to communicate with the batteries at Ramla Bay as well as Mġarr ix-Xini Tower, so it could relay messages across Gozo. It was also able to provide refuge for the local population in case of a corsair raid.

Today, the tower is a private residence. It was included on the Antiquities List of 1925. The tower is now scheduled as a Grade 1 monument, and it is also listed on the National Inventory of the Cultural Property of the Maltese Islands.

== Architecture ==
Santa Cecilia Tower is a small rectangular structure made of limestone. It is rather plain, but it has finials and other decorative features.
