= St. Cecilia Church (Stamford, Connecticut) =

Coordinates: 41.1005°N 73.5316°W

- St. Cecilia Church
- Location: 1184 Newfield Avenue; Stamford, Connecticut
- Country: United States
- Denomination: Roman Catholic

Architecture
- Architect: Gustave E. Steinback

Administration
- Province: Hartford
- Diocese: Bridgeport

Clergy
- Bishop: Most Rev. Frank J. Caggiano

St. Cecilia is a Roman Catholic church in Stamford, Connecticut, United States, part of the Diocese of Bridgeport.

== History ==
The church is located in the Springdale section of Stamford. The church was built 1959 to the designs of Stamford resident and distinguished architect Gustave E. Steinback.
