= Saint Mary's Tower =

Large bastioned watchtower on the island of Comino in Malta; a Wignacourt tower

- Torri ta' Santa Marija
- Part of the Wignacourt towers
- Comino, Malta
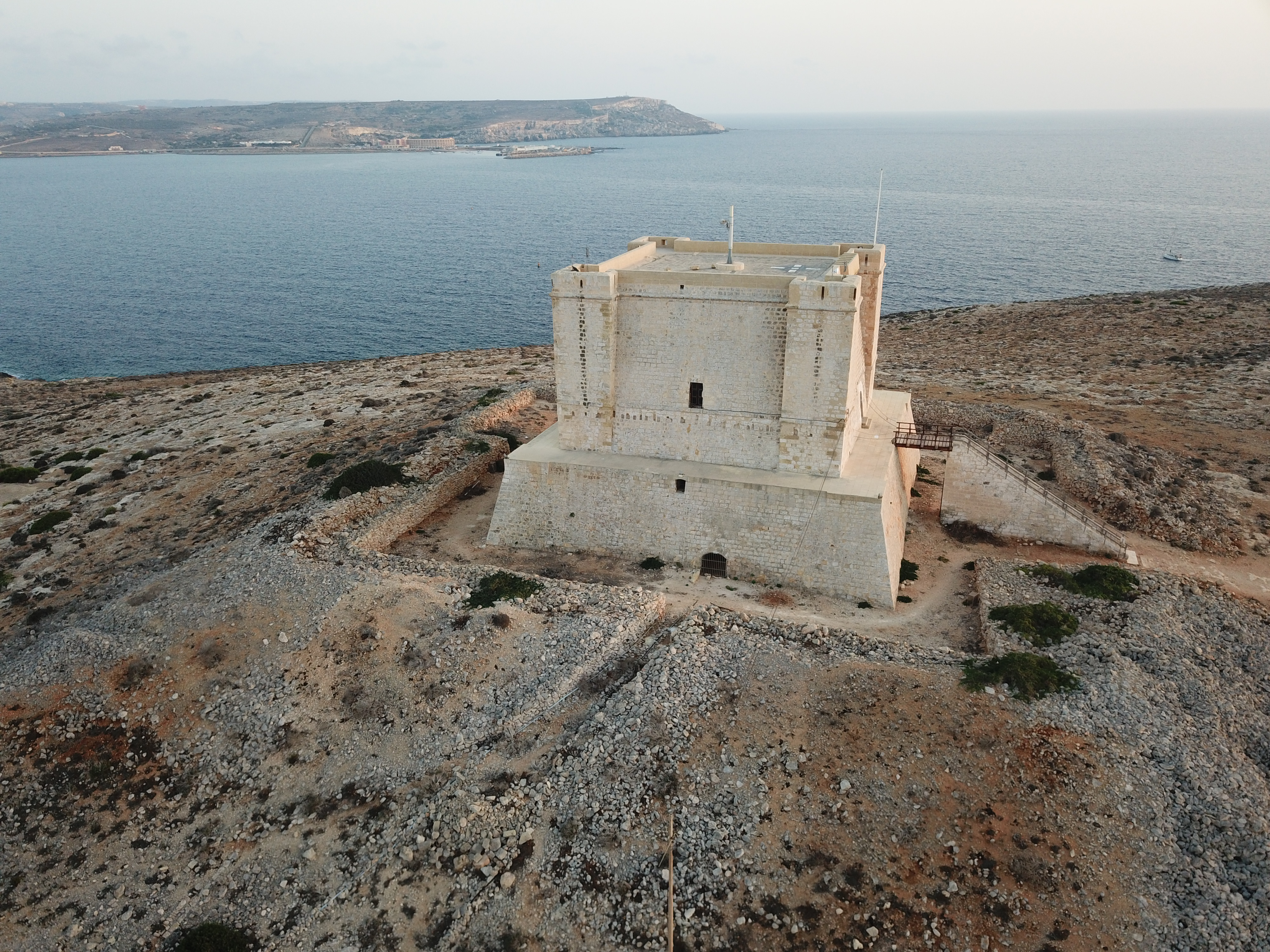
- Saint Mary's Tower

Site information
- Type: Bastioned coastal watchtower
- Owner: Government of Malta
- Controlled by: Din l-Art Ħelwa
- Open to the public: Yes
- Condition: Intact

Location
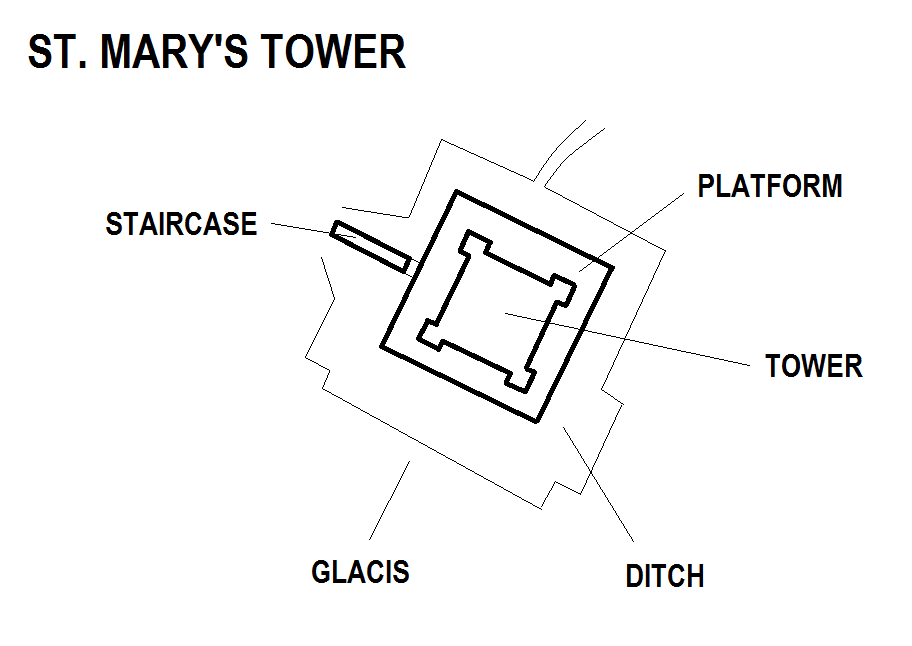
- Plan of St Mary's Tower
- Coordinates: 36°00′24.8″N 14°19′47.2″E

Site history
- Built: 1618
- Built by: Order of Saint John
- In use: 1618–1829; 1982–2002
- Materials: Limestone

Saint Mary's Tower (Maltese: Torri ta' Santa Marija), also known as the Comino Tower (Maltese: Torri ta' Kemmuna), is a large bastioned watchtower on the island of Comino in Malta. It was built in 1618, the fifth of six Wignacourt towers. The tower was used by the Armed Forces of Malta until 2002, and it is now in the hands of Din l-Art Ħelwa.

The tower is a prominent landmark of Comino, and can be clearly seen from both Malta and Gozo, as well as from the ferry between the islands.

== History ==
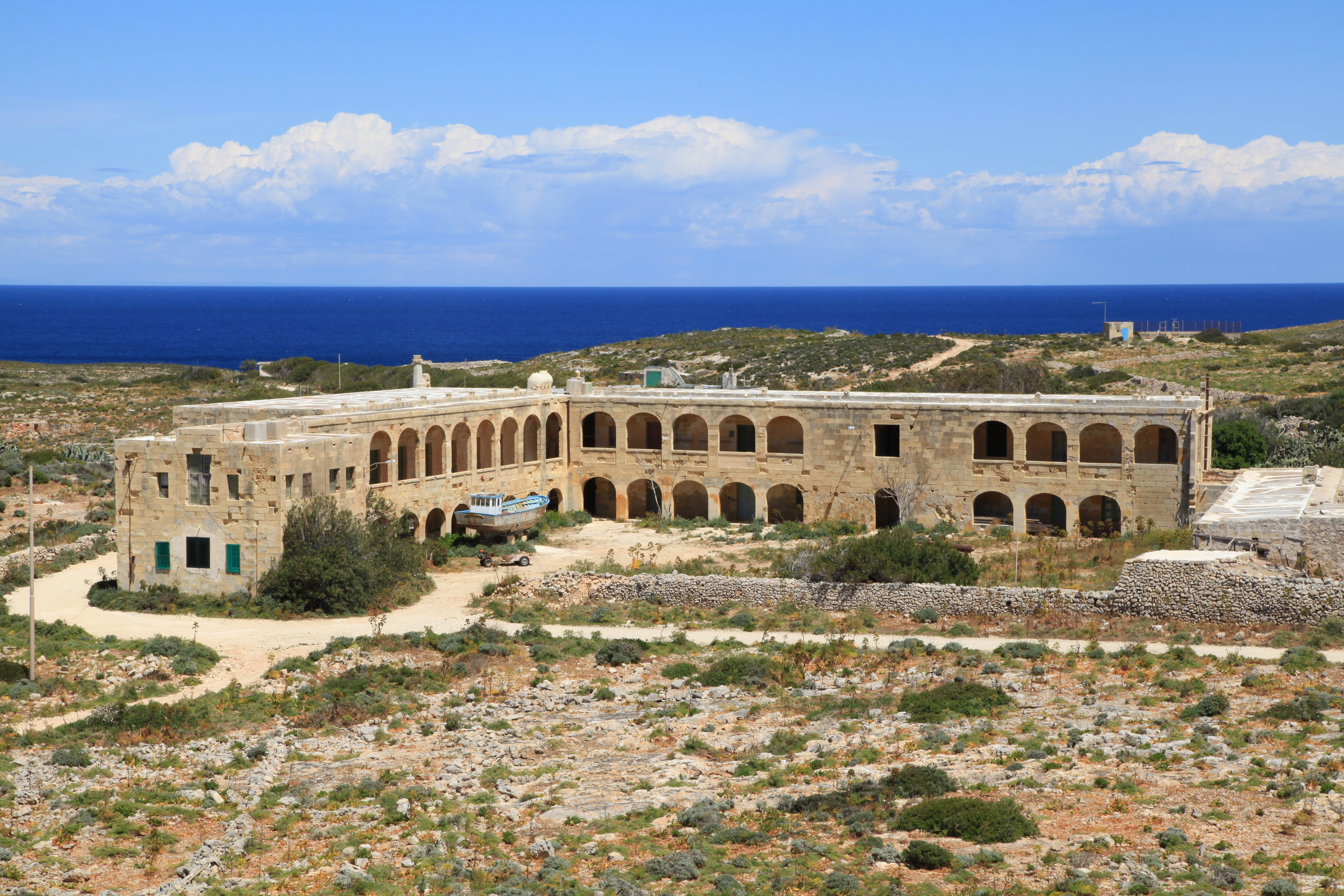
Comino Barracks, located just north of the tower

Saint Mary's Tower was built in 1618 to defend the island of Comino since ships travelling between Malta and Gozo were often attacked by Barbary corsairs based on the cliffs and creeks of Comino. It also served as a communications link between the island of Gozo and mainland Malta in case of an attack on Gozo.

Funds for its construction were raised primarily by means of the sale of Comino brushwood, and the total cost was 18,628 scudi, 5 tari and 10 grani, which made it the most expensive of all the Wignacourt towers. However, the high costs were probably due to the difficulties for transportation and construction on a barren island.

The tower's architect is unknown. In 1647, Giovanni Francesco Abela claimed that it was designed by Vittorio Cassar, but this is unlikely since Cassar had died even before work on the tower began.

The tower is a large, square building with four corner turrets, and is located about 80 metres above sea level. The tower itself is about 12 metres tall, with walls that are approximately 6 metres thick, and is raised on a platform and plinth that are approximately 8 metres high. A musketry gallery was built on the plinth, but this no longer exists. Overall, the tower is higher than any of the other Wignacourt towers. The tower was surrounded by a ditch and glacis, the remains of which can still be seen today. A chapel dedicated to Saint Joseph is also located within the tower.

During times of crisis, its garrison numbered up to 60 soldiers. By 1791, its armament included two 12-pound iron cannon, one 10-pound bronze cannon, one 4-pound bronze cannon, and two 3-pound bronze cannon. After 1715, Saint Mary's Battery and Saint Mary's Redoubt were also built around the coast of Comino, and these had a garrison of 130 men and housed eight 32-pounder and ten 24-pounder cannons, which dominated the North and South Comino Channels.

Later on, the Order also built a barrack block on Comino, a short distance away from the tower. The barracks were later used as an isolation hospital.

In the 17th century, Comino served as a place of imprisonment or exile for errant knights. Knights who were convicted of minor crimes were occasionally sentenced to the lonely and dangerous task of manning St. Mary's Tower. During the French blockade of 1798–1800, St. Mary's Tower served as a prison by the Maltese insurgents and their British allies for suspected spies or French sympathizers. In 1799, the insurgents transferred the tower's cannons to blockade batteries to bombard French positions. Insurgent positions armed with cannons taken from Comino included Tas-Samra Battery and Ta' Għemmuna Battery.

The tower was abandoned by the British military in 1829. For several decades it was deemed to be property of the local civil authorities, and may have been used as an isolation hospital, or even as a wintering pen for farm animals. The tower again saw active service during both World War I and World War II. The tower was included on the Antiquities List of 1925.

Between 1982 and 2002, the tower was used by the Armed Forces of Malta. It served as a lookout and staging post to guard against contraband and the illegal hunting of migratory birds at sea.

== 21st century ==
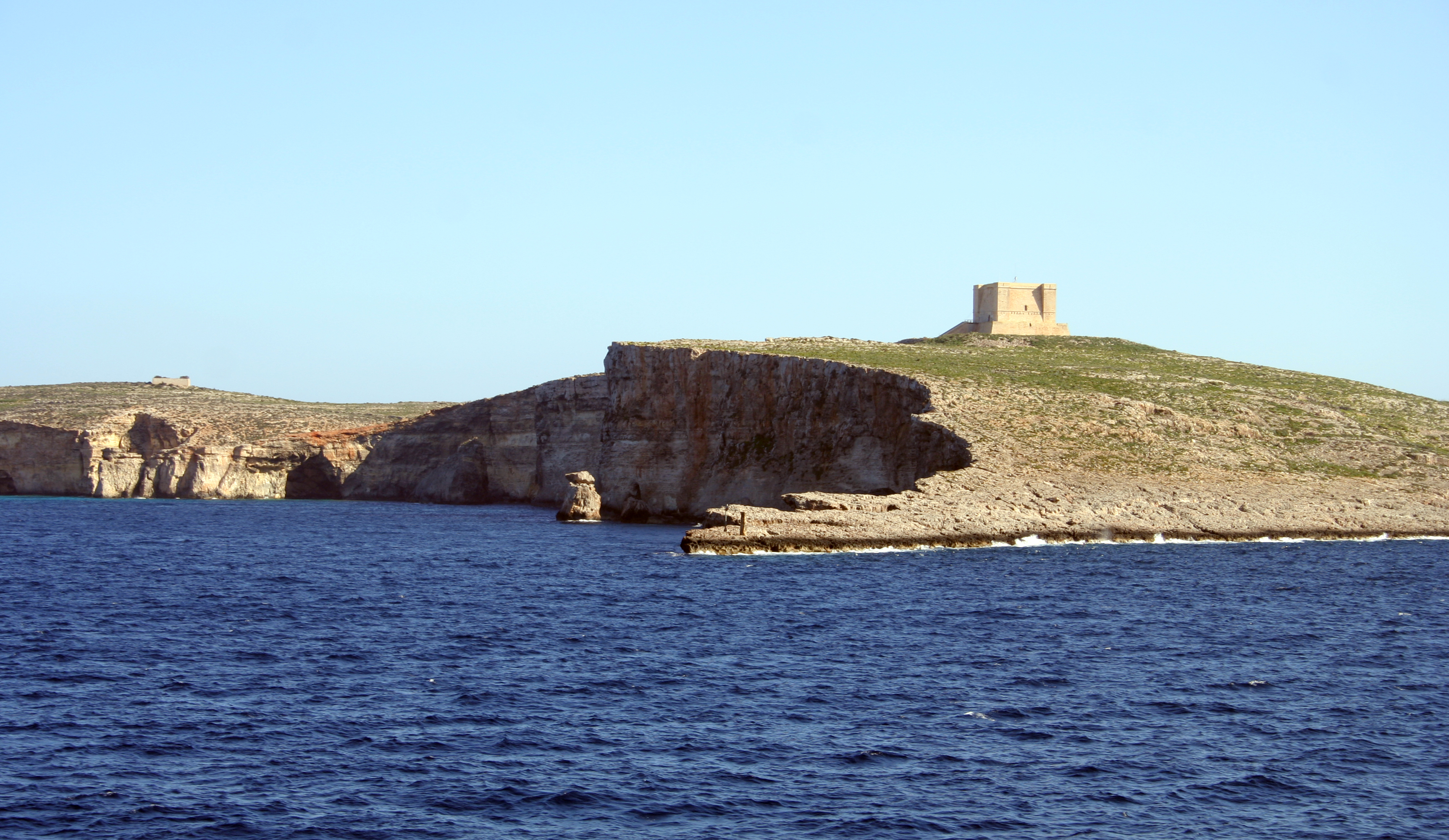
The tower as viewed from the Gozo ferry

St. Mary's Tower was handed to Din l-Art Ħelwa in 2002. It was restored between 2002 and 2004 and is open to the public.

== In popular culture ==
- St Mary's Tower represented the prison Château d'If in the 2002 film The Count of Monte Cristo starring Jim Caviezel.
- The tower was depicted on a postage stamp issued by MaltaPost in 2006.

== See also ==
- Saint Mary's Battery
- Saint Mary's Redoubt
