= Santa Cecilia Chapel =

St Cecilia's Chapel
- Il-Kappella ta' Santa Ċeċilja
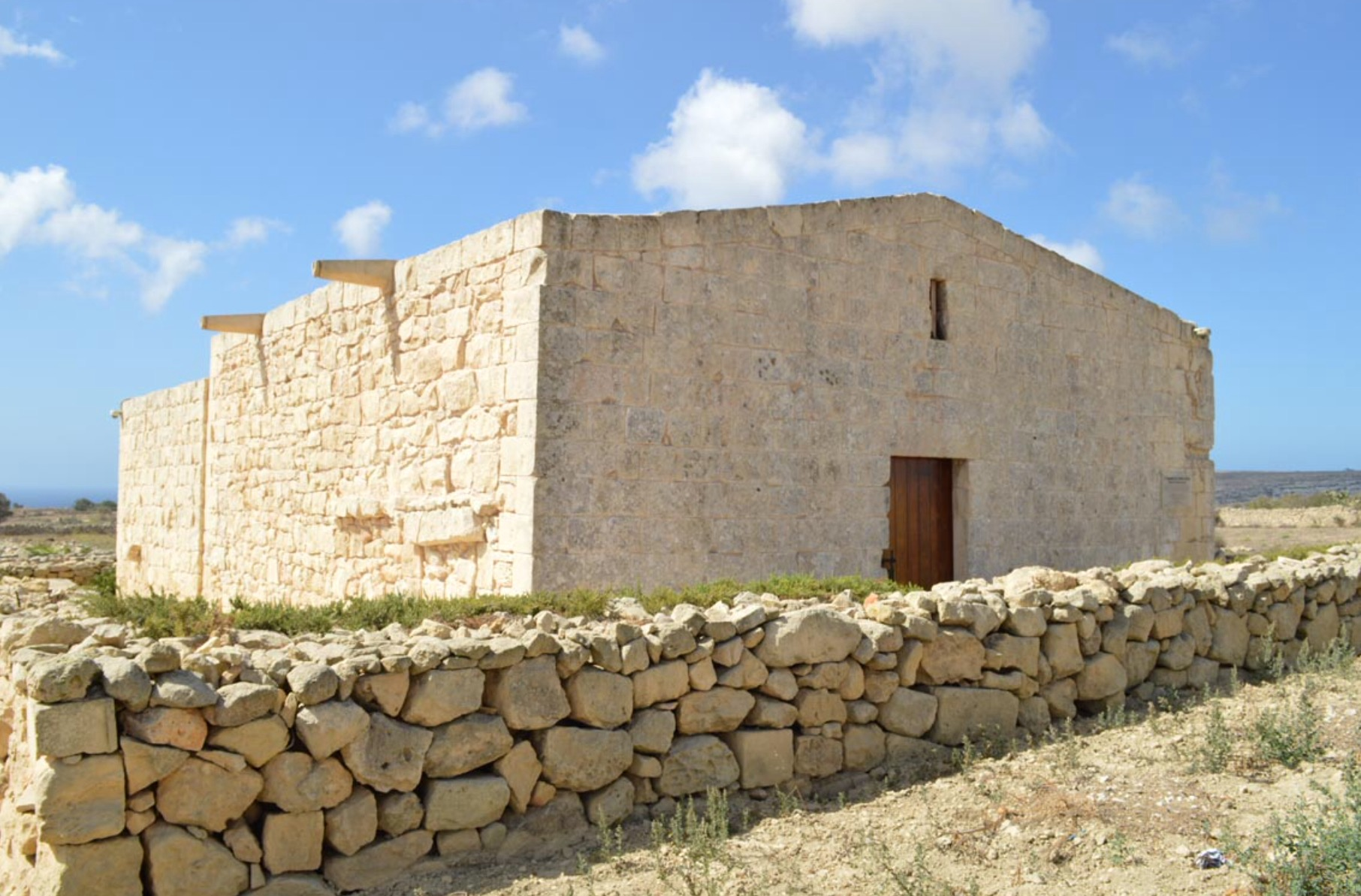
- View of the Santa Cecilia Chapel
- St Cecilia's Chapel
- 36°1′43″N 14°16′25.7″E
- Location: Xewkija
- Country: Malta
- Denomination: Roman Catholic

History
- Status: Chapel
- Dedication: Saint Cecilia

Architecture
- Functional status: Deconsecrated
- Style: Medieval/Vernacular
- Completed: c. 1540

Specifications
- Length: 7 m (23 ft)
- Width: 7 m (23 ft)
- Materials: Limestone

The St Cecilia Chapel (Maltese: Il-Kappella ta' Santa Ċeċilja or ta' Santa Ċilja) is a former Roman Catholic chapel in the limits of Xewkija, Gozo, Malta, dedicated to Saint Cecilia. It was built around 1540, but it was deconsecrated in 1644, being converted into an ancillary building for the nearby Santa Cecilia Tower.

The only surviving medieval chapel on Gozo, it was severely damaged in an arson attack in 2007 and partially collapsed in 2008. The chapel was then passed to the NGO Wirt Għawdex, which restored it between 2008 and 2011. Since its inauguration in 2012, the restored chapel is open to the public once every month.

== History ==
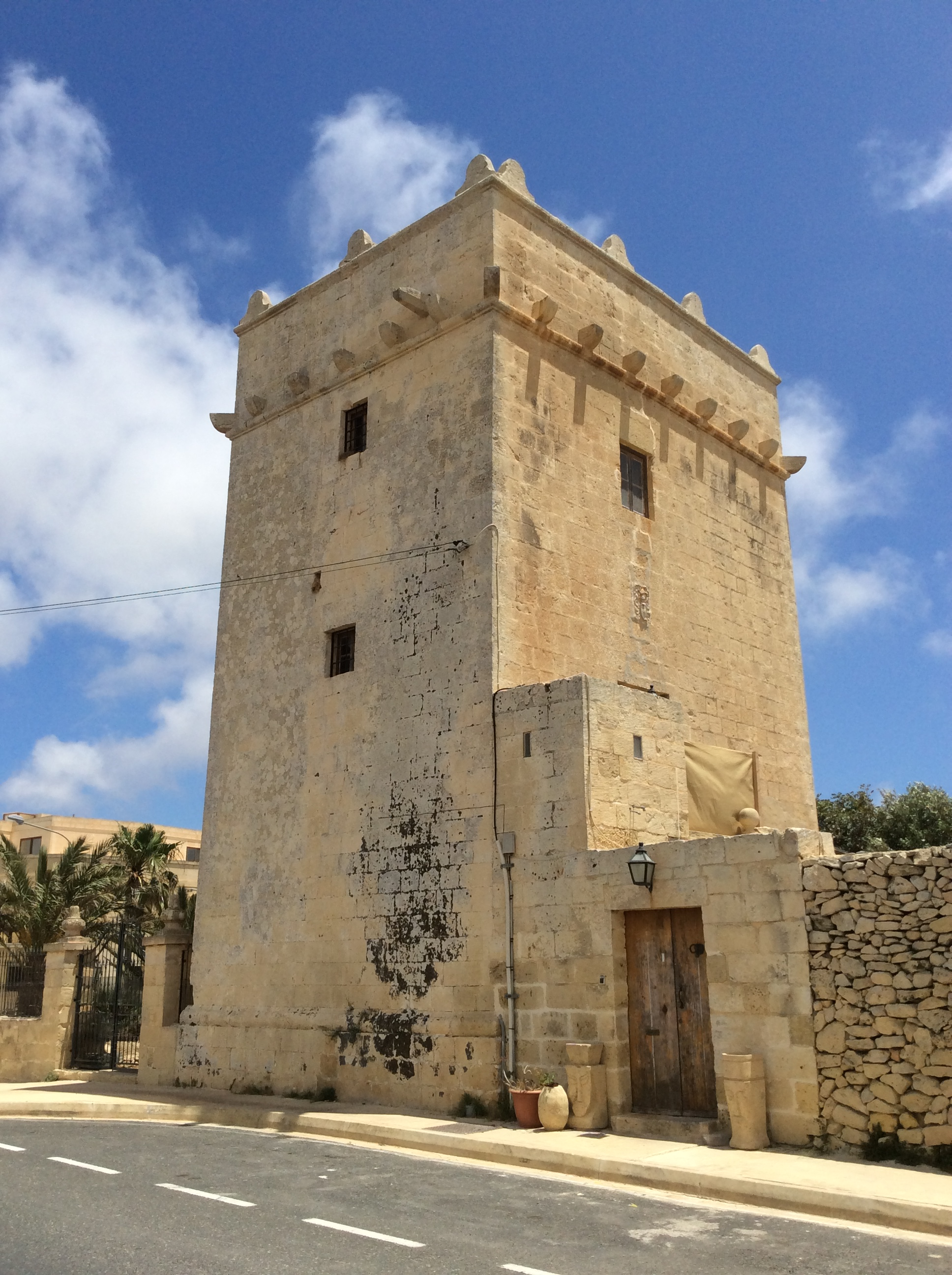
The nearby Santa Cecilia Tower, which was built in 1613

The date of construction of the Santa Cecilia Chapel is unknown, but it is believed to date back to around 1540. The area around the chapel was referred to as Santa Cecilie del Mugiarro or in variants of that name in notarial documents dated 1424 and 1569. The surrounding area is still known as ta' Santa Ċeċilja or ta' Santa Ċilja. The oldest recorded reference to the building itself was made in a pastoral visit by Bishop Baldassare Cagliares in 1615.

In 1613, the knight Fra Bernardo Macedonia built a tower nearby and it was called the Santa Cecilia Tower after the chapel. The chapel was described as being in good condition in 1630, and it was maintained through donations in the next few years. However, it was in a bad state by 1635, and it was deconsecrated in 1644. The chapel became an ancillary building to the tower, at times probably housing a mule-driven mill.

The chapel (along with the tower) was scheduled as a Grade 1 monument in 1996, and it was expropriated by the government in 1997, although the order was not executed due to a compensation issue and the chapel remained in use as an animal shelter and a store until the early 21st century. Its interior was burnt down by vandals in August 2007, causing irreparable damage. Part of the west wall and some roof slabs collapsed after heavy rainfall in January 2008.

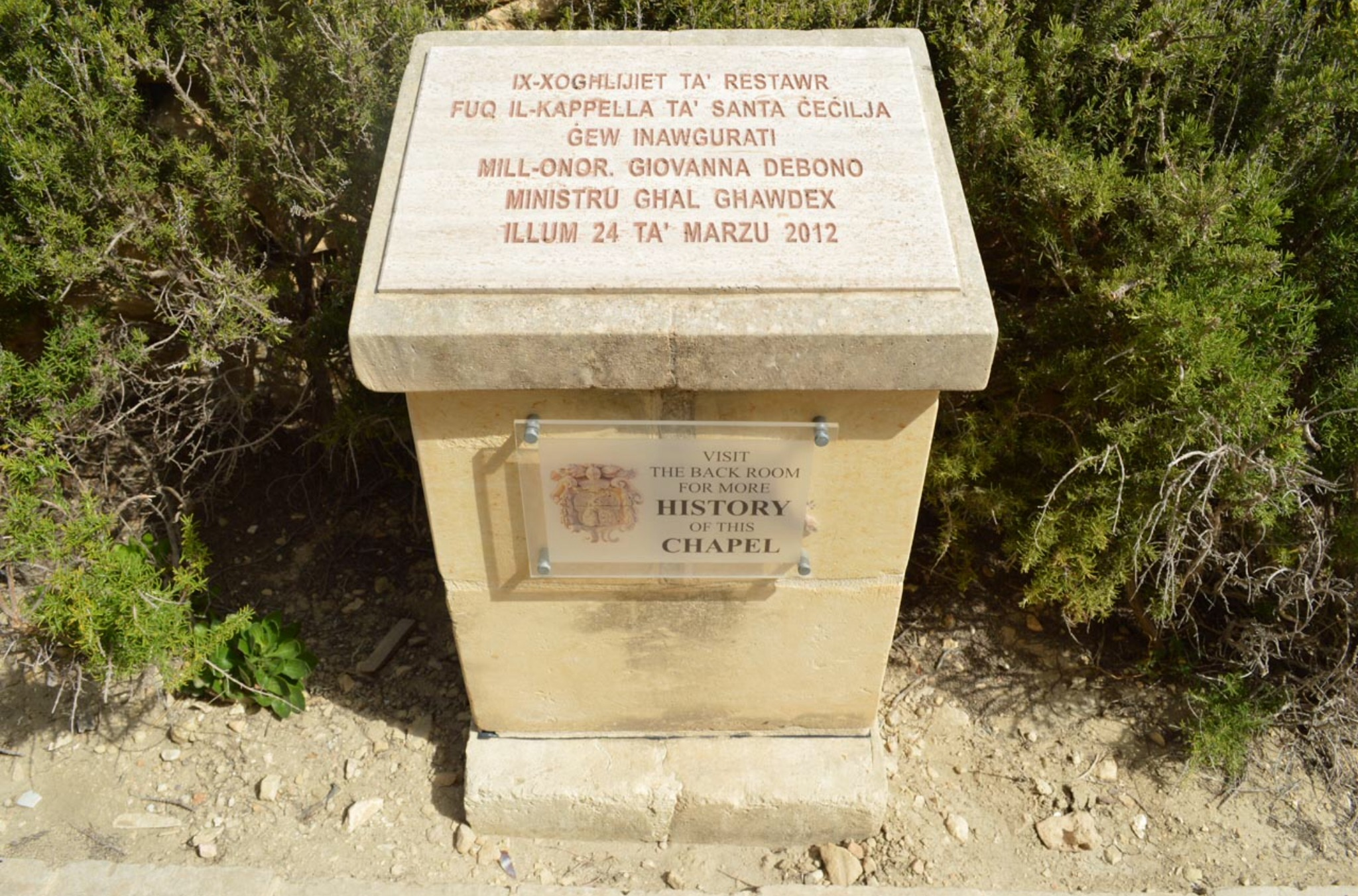
Plinth with a plaque commemorating the inauguration of the restored chapel in 2012

Emergency stabilization works were carried out after the 2008 collapse, and later that year the chapel was entrusted to the NGO Wirt Għawdex. Restoration work carried out by Wirt Għawdex and the Ministry for Gozo continued until 2011, and it was inaugurated on 24 March 2012. The restoration was sponsored by the Baron Group of Companies, with additional funds coming through eco-Gozo projects and The Rotary Club Gozo. The chapel was converted into a venue for cultural activities including lectures, exhibitions and concerts.

The chapel remains under the care of Wirt Għawdex, and it is open to the public free of charge on the last Saturday of every month from 11:00 to 13:00. Group visits can be arranged by appointment.

The chapel is now also listed on the National Inventory of the Cultural Property of the Maltese Islands.

== Architecture ==
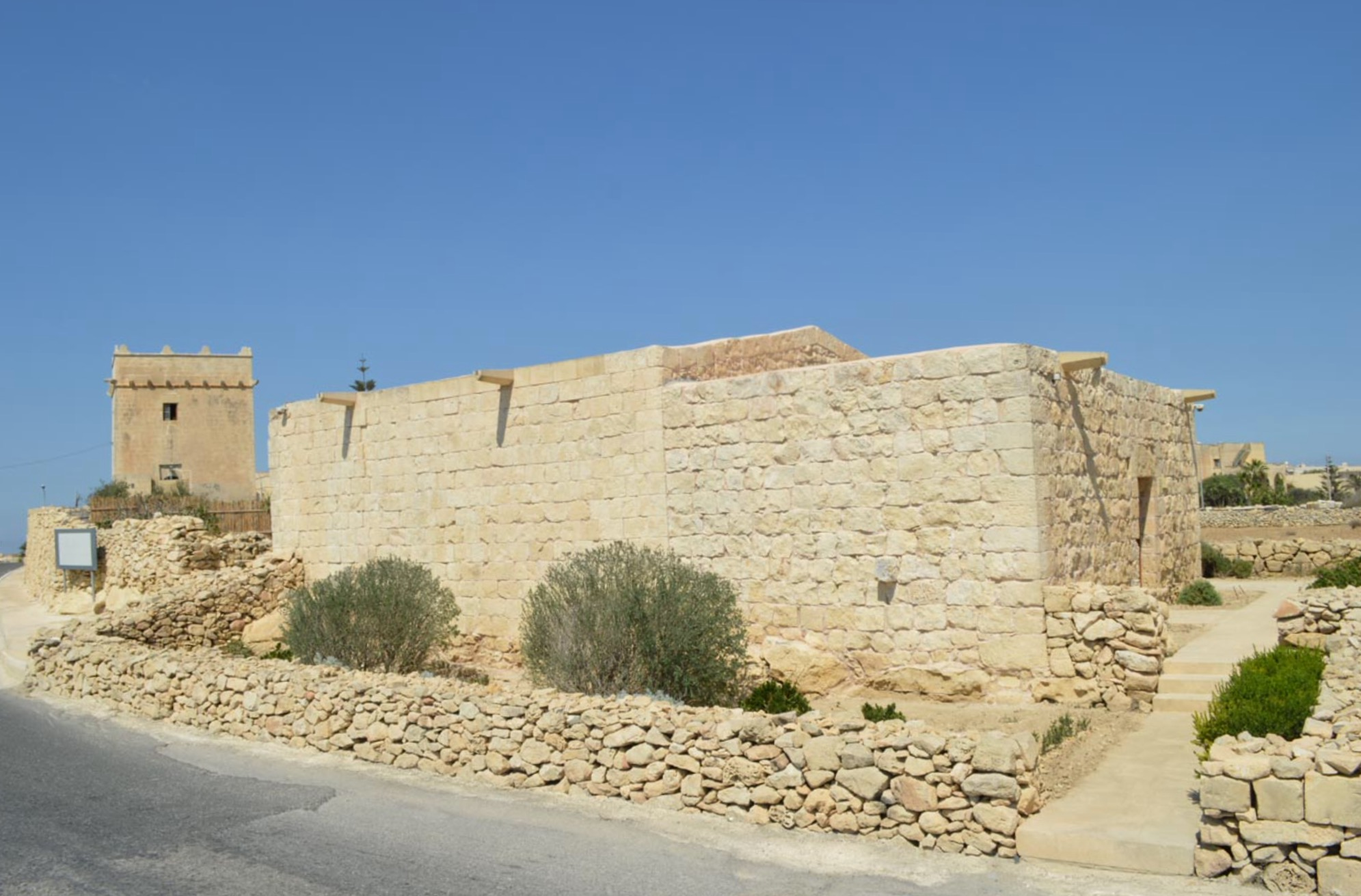
The Santa Cecilia Chapel as viewed from the rear, with Santa Cecilia Tower at far

The Santa Cecilia Chapel has a simple design, and it is a typical example of Maltese vernacular architecture from the late medieval period. It is the best preserved unaisled chapel in Malta, which were once common throughout the islands. It is the only surviving medieval chapel in Gozo.

The building has an almost perfect square plan, measuring 7 m × 7 m (23 ft × 23 ft), having a slight pitch on the roof. The chapel is constructed out of local limestone, with the façade being constructed out of ashlar blocks while the other sides are built out of rubble stonework. The chapel's floor is about 1 m (3 ft 3 in) below ground level, so it is led to by three steps. The interior is divided into four bays by three stone arches, which support the building's roof. A small window above the door is the only source of natural light in the chapel, apart from the doorway.
