= List of members of the European Parliament for Malta, 2024–2029 =

This is a list of the 6 members of the European Parliament for Malta in the 2024 to 2029 session. The members were elected in the 2024 European Parliament election in Malta.

== List ==
| Name | National party | EP Group | Preference votes |
|---|---|---|---|
| Alex Agius Saliba | Labour Party (PL) | S&D | 63,899 |
| Daniel Attard | Labour Party (PL) | S&D | 11,703 |
| Thomas Bajada | Labour Party (PL) | S&D | 10,792 |
| Roberta Metsola | Nationalist Party (PN) | EPP | 87,473 |
| Peter Agius | Nationalist Party (PN) | EPP | 9,418 |
| David Casa | Nationalist Party (PN) | EPP | 3,683 |

Source: "MEP ELECTION". Electoral Commission of Malta.
