= List of female members of the European Parliament for Malta =

This is a list of women who are or have been members of the European Parliament for Malta.

== List ==
| Image | Name | National party | EP group | Elected | Year left | Ref. |
|---|---|---|---|---|---|---|
| | Roberta Metsola | Nationalist Party | EPP | 2013 (Note: Elected as replacement for Simon Busuttil.) | Incumbent (Note: Currently serving as the President of the European Parliament.) | |
| | Marlene Mizzi | Labour Party | S&D | 2013 (Note: Elected as replacement for Edward Scicluna.) | 2019 | |
| | Claudette Abela Baldacchino | Labour Party | S&D | 2013 (Note: Elected as replacement for Louis Grech.) | 2014 | |
| | Therese Comodini Cachia | Nationalist Party | EPP | 2014 | 2017 (Note: Resigned and was replaced by Francis Zammit Dimech.) | |
| | Miriam Dalli | Labour Party | S&D | 2014 | 2020 (Note: Resigned and was replaced by Cyrus Engerer.) | |
| | Josianne Cutajar | Labour Party | S&D | 2019 | 2024 | |

== See also ==
- Women in Malta
- Malta (European Parliament constituency)
