= 2009 European Parliament election in Malta =

- 6 June 2009

5 seats to the European Parliament

An election of the delegation from Malta to the European Parliament was held on 6 June 2009, on the same day as the 2009 Maltese local council elections.

== Candidates ==
=== Alternattiva Demokratika – AD (Democratic Alternative) ===
- Arnold Cassola
- Yvonne Ebejer Arqueros

=== Alleanza Liberali – ALDM (Liberal Alliance) ===
- John Zammit

=== Alpha Partit Demokratiku Liberali – APDL (Alpha Liberal Democratic Party) ===
- Emmy Bezzina

=== Azzjoni Nazzjonali – AN (National Action (Malta)) ===
- Josie Muscat
- Malcolm Seychell
- John Spiteri

=== Imperium Europa – IE (European Empire) ===
- Norman Lowell
- Reuben Attard

=== K.U.L. Ewropa (KULE) ===
- Cecil Herbie Jones

=== Libertas Malta (LM) ===
- Mary Gauci

=== Partit tal-Ajkla – PA (Eagle's Party) ===
- Nazzareno Bonnici

=== Partit Laburista (Malta Labour Party) – PL ===
- Claudette Abela Baldacchino
- John Attard Montalto
- Glenn Bedingfield
- Steve Borg
- Maria Camilleri
- Joseph Cuschieri
- Sharon Ellul-Bonici
- Louis Grech
- Kirill Micallef Stafrace
- Marlene Mizzi
- Edward Scicluna
- Christian Zammit

=== Partit Nazzjonalista (PN) ===
- Simon Busuttil
- David Casa
- Rudolph Cini
- Alan Deidun
- Edward Demicoli
- Vince Farrugia
- Roberta Metsola Tedesco Triccas
- Alex Perici Calascione
- Frank Portelli
- Marthese Portelli

== Results ==
The turnout was 78.81%. The Partit Laburista garnered 54.77% of first-count votes and the Partit Nazzjonalista garnered 40.49%; 2.31% of votes cast were invalid. Simon Busuttil MEP was the only candidate to be elected on the first count with 68,782 (27.72%) single votes.

Party	Votes	%	Seats			
Party	Votes	%	Seats	+/–	Post-Lisbon	+/–
Labour Party	135,917	54.77	3	0	4	+1
Nationalist Party	100,486	40.49	2	0	2	0
Democratic Alternative	5,802	2.34	0	0	0	0
Imperium Europa	3,637	1.47	0	0	0	0
National Action	1,595	0.64	0	New	0	0
Libertas Malta	298	0.12	0	New	0	0
Liberal Alliance	189	0.08	0	New	0	0
Alpha Liberal Democratic Party	118	0.05	0	0	0	0
Ajkla	80	0.03	0	New	0	0
K.U.L. Ewropa	47	0.02	0	0	0	0
Total	248,169	100.00	5	0	6	+1
Valid votes	248,169	97.69				
Invalid/blank votes	5,870	2.31				
Total votes	254,039	100.00				
Registered voters/turnout	322,411	78.79				
Source: Electoral Commission

=== Elected MEPs ===
Elected MEPs (5)
Candidate	Party	EU Party	1st count	29th count
Simon Busuttil	PN	EPP	68,782	41,362
David Casa	PN	EPP	6,539	41,362
Louis Grech	PL	PES	27,753	40,529
Edward Scicluna	PL	PES	24,574	39,250
John Attard Montalto	PL	PES	12,880	30,129

Next in line for Treaty of Lisbon additional seat (1)
Joseph Cuschieri	PL	PES	19,672	29,375

== See also ==
- European elections in Malta
- 2004 European Parliament election in Malta
