= Terrence Portelli =

Maltese far-right politician

Leader of Imperium Europa
- In office 9 February 2025 – March 2026
- Preceded by: Norman Lowell
- Succeeded by: Eman Cross

Personal details
- Born: Malta
- Party: Imperium Europa
- Occupation: Politician

Terrence Portelli is a Maltese politician and asset recovery manager who served as leader of Imperium Europa, a far-right political party in Malta, from February 2025 to March 2026. He previously contested the 2024 European Parliament election as a candidate for the party.

== Political career ==
In September 2023, Portelli, alongside Normal Lowell (as planned candidates for the 2024 elections), spoke at an Imperium Europa press conference in front of the Great Siege Monument in Valletta. He presented the party as the only solution for Malta, citing the need to address forces dividing identity and to “rekindle the fire of masculinity and femininity in society”.

=== European Parliament candidacy ===
Portelli contested the 2024 June European Parliament election in Malta as a candidate for Imperium Europa. Malta elects six Members of the European Parliament (MEPs) using the single transferable vote system.

Portelli’s campaign included opposition to further European Union integration. He advocated for Malta's withdrawal from the eurozone and the reintroduction of the Maltese lira, which he proposed should be backed by gold. He also supported changes to Malta's political system based on the model of Athenian democracy.

In a May 2024 interview with the Times of Malta, Portelli criticized established political figures, referring to them as "puppet politicians" and "leeches". He spoke of rounding them up and handing them over to their “enemy,” and framed it in historical terms (comparing it to Arminius). He also opposed foreign military involvement and financial support in international conflicts and criticized European security policies.

During debates organized by the National Youth Council in late May, Portelli raised issues concerning Malta’s current media transparency and allotted freedom of expression. He also argued that continued immigration could result in Malta's native population becoming a minority.

==== Results ====
Portelli himself received 147 first-preference votes (0.06%). He was eliminated early in the first-round counting process after receiving a small number of transferred votes, finishing with around 154–158 votes in total. Nearly all of the party’s support went to Norman Lowell, who obtained 6,669 first-preference votes but was also eliminated later without reaching the quota required for election (37,180 votes).

=== Leadership of Imperium Europa ===
On 9 February 2025, Portelli became leader of Imperium Europa, succeeding the party's founder, Norman Lowell. His tenure followed a period of declining electoral support for the party.

Portelli resigned as party leader in March 2026, citing personal reasons and limited time. He was succeeded by Eman Cross, who was selected by the party's executive council.
