= 2024 European Parliament election in Malta =

- 8 June 2024

All 6 Maltese seats in the European Parliament
- Turnout: 72.98%
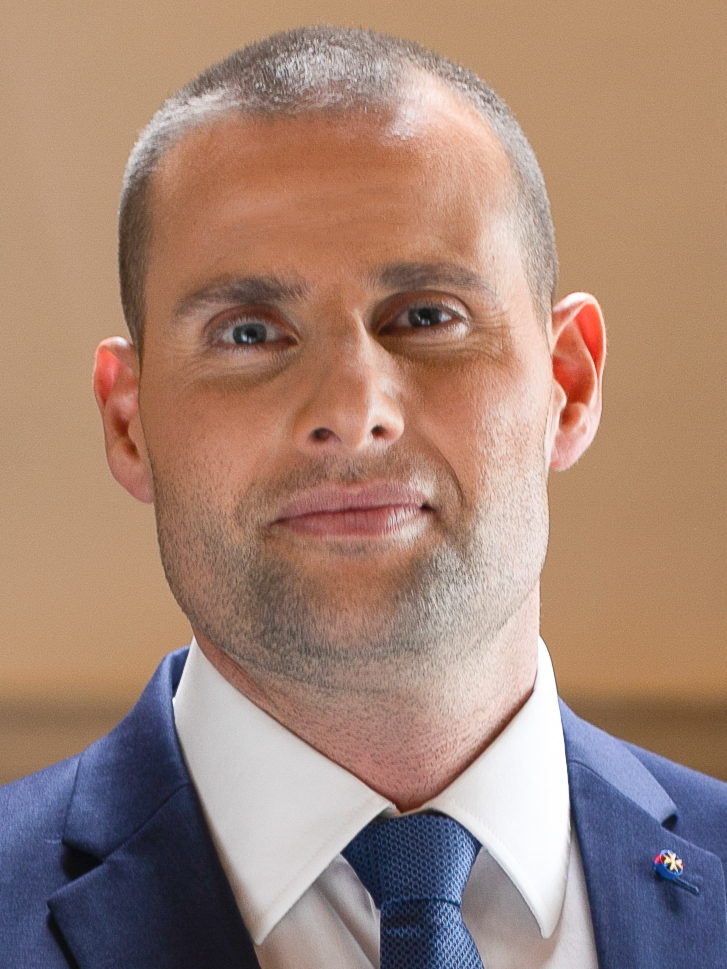

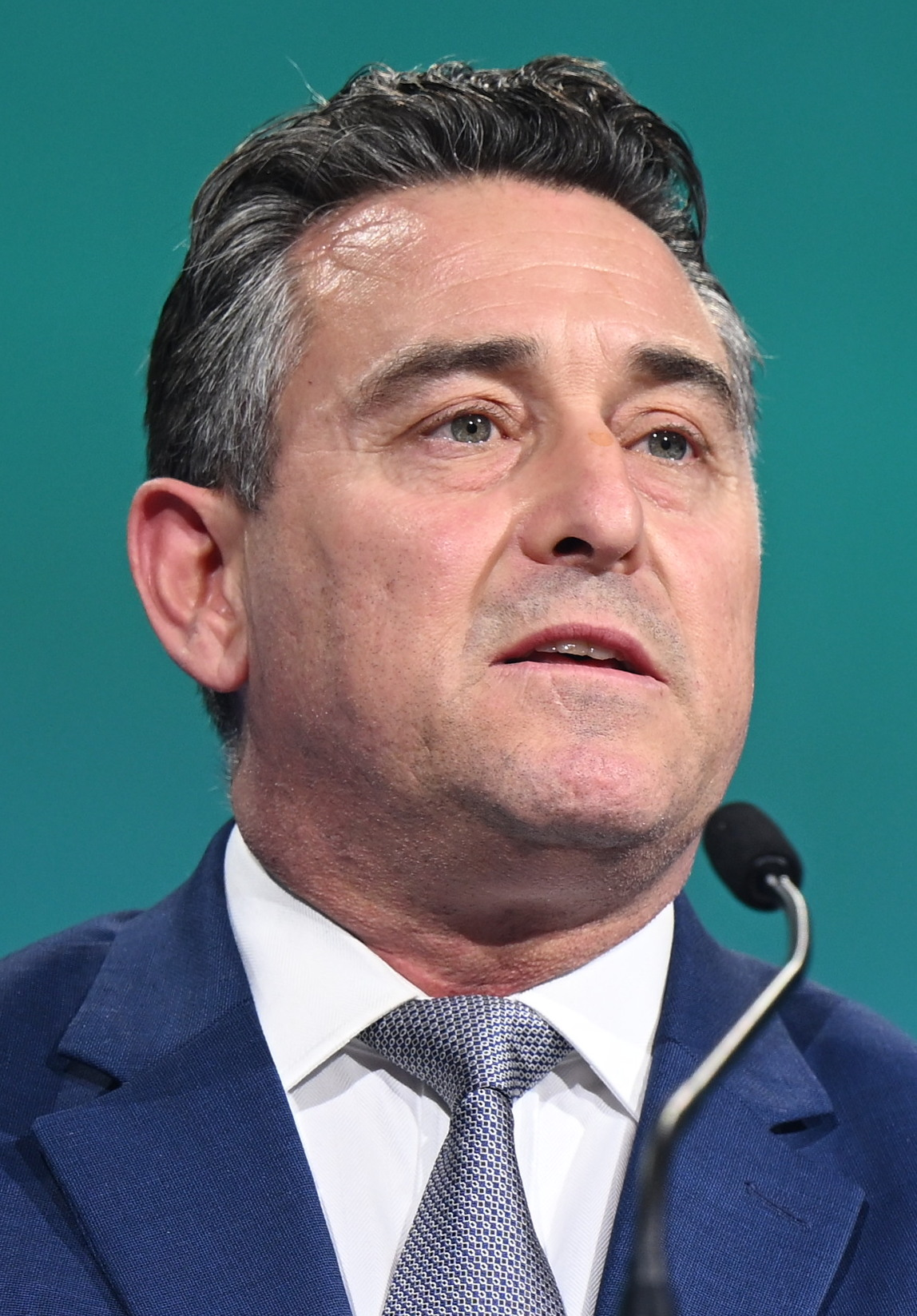
	First party	Second party
Leader	Robert Abela (Note: Not contesting an EP seat)	Bernard Grech
Party	Labour	Nationalist
Alliance	S&D	EPP
Last election	4 seats; 54.29%	2 seats; 37.24%
Seats won	3	3
Seat change	▼1	▲1
Popular vote	117,805	109,351
Percentage	45.26%	42.02%
Swing	▼9.03	▲4.12

The 2024 European Parliament election was held in Malta on 8 June 2024 in tandem with local elections. It was the fifth election to the European Parliament, electing 6 of the 720 Members of the European Parliament. EU citizens aged 16 and over were entitled to vote, provided they registered to do so. While 6 different political parties announced their participation, only the Labour Party and the Nationalist Party won seats, as in the last election in which they won 4 and 2 seats respectively. In this election, they each won 3 seats, Labour losing 1 and the Nationalists gaining 1.

== Outgoing standing of Maltese seats in the 2019-2024 EU Parliament ==
Party		European Party	Outgoing delegation	
Party		European Party	Seats	Group
Labour Party	Incumbent MEPs:	PES	4	S&D
Labour Party	Alfred Sant	PES	4	S&D
Labour Party	Josianne Cutajar	PES	4	S&D
Labour Party	Alex Agius Saliba	PES	4	S&D
Labour Party	Cyrus Engerer	PES	4	S&D
Nationalist Party	Incumbent MEPs:	EPP	2	EPP
Nationalist Party	Roberta Metsola	EPP	2	EPP
Nationalist Party	David Casa	EPP	2	EPP

=== MEPs not standing for re-election ===
Departing MEP	Party	EP Group	First elected	Date announced
Josianne Cutajar	Labour	S&D	2019	15 January 2024
Cyrus Engerer	Labour	S&D	2020	27 April 2024
Alfred Sant	Labour	S&D	2014	12 March 2021

== Electoral system ==
MEPs are elected from a nationwide six-seat constituency by single transferable vote. Candidates who pass the Hagenbach-Bischoff quota in the first round are elected, and any surplus votes transferred to the remaining candidates, who will be elected if this enables them to pass the quota. The lowest ranked candidates are then eliminated one-by-one with their preferences transferred to other candidates, who are elected as they pass the quotient, until all six seats are filled.

== Participating parties/candidates ==
The below parties and/or independent candidates declared their participation in the upcoming European Parliament elections listed in order of candidate quantity. Times of Malta released a final list after nominations closed. A total number of 39 candidates contested this election, also a record 13 of such being independents.

Party		European Party	Quantity	Names	Election Program
	Labour Party	PES	9	Claudette Abela Baldacchino; Alex Agius Saliba; Clint Azzopardi Flores; Daniel Attard; Thomas Bajada; Jesmond Bonello; Steve Ellul; Jesmond Marshall; Marija Sara Vella Gafà	Election Program
Partit Nazzjonalista	Nationalist Party	EPP	8	Roberta Metsola (incumbent-outgoing President of the EP); David Casa; David Agius; Peter Agius; Miriana Calleja Testaferrata de Noto; Norma Camilleri; LouisAnne Pulis; Lee Bugeja Bartolo	Election Program
	AD+PD	EGP	4	Sandra Gauci; Mina Tolu; Ralph Cassar; Rachelle 'REA' Deguara	Election Program
	Imperium Europa	–	2	Norman Lowell; Terrence Portelli	Election Program
	ABBA	ECPM	2	Ivan Grech Mintoff; Tania Gauci Fiorini	N/A
	Volt Malta	Volt	1	Matthias Iannis Portelli	Election Program
Independent candidates or non-registered parties		Various or Non-inscrit	13	Nazzareno Bonniċi ('tal-Ajkla'); Arnold Cassola; Edwin Vassallo; James Ryder (Note: Stage name mistakenly reported as proper name by media. The proper name according to the official Electoral Commissioner press release — meaning which will appear on the ballot — is James Michael Muscat.); Simon Mercieca; Alexander D'Agata; Radu Gheorghi; Stephen Florian; Conrad Borg Manché; Noel Apap; Malcolm Bezzina; George Grixti; Adrian Zammit	Some of these candidates released programmes in the form of points throughout their campaigning.

The People's Party did not put forward any candidates.

== Campaign ==
=== Labour Party ===
The Labour Party launched its MEP election campaign at the closing of its General Council on 28 April 2024 at the party's headquarters in Ħamrun, where Prime Minister Robert Abela called on voters to unite behind the government. The party's European election manifesto was subsequently unveiled by Abela at a public activity in Siġgiewi. The document offered what MaltaToday described as a small-island perspective, focusing on Malta's dependence on the aviation and maritime sectors, and including a proposal for a "systematic evaluation of the impact on small member states and island state members" before any EU legislation is enacted. Analysts noted the manifesto conspicuously omitted themes central to the wider European Socialists' platform, including gender equality, the rule of law, and tax justice, and fell short of the S&D's stated position on the war in Ukraine and on Israel's conduct in Gaza. On 1 May 2024, Workers' Day, Abela addressed a mass meeting at St George's Square in Valletta, urging supporters to keep calm and avoid provocation amid the recent conclusion of the magisterial inquiry into the Vitals hospitals deal.

=== Nationalist Party ===
The Nationalist Party opened its European election campaign on Workers' Day, 1 May 2024, at a gathering at Ġnien l-Għarusa tal-Mosta. Party leader Bernard Grech unveiled the campaign slogan Għalik (Maltese: "For You") and devoted much of his address to the recently concluded magisterial inquiry into the Vitals hospitals deal, accusing the Labour government of prioritising its own protection over the public. Grech called on voters to support all PN candidates, arguing the party had achieved much with two MEPs and could do more with three a reference to veteran MEP David Casa and European Parliament President Roberta Metsola. Metsola also addressed the gathering, reaching out to voters who felt betrayed by Labour, urging them not to lose hope, and stressing that not all politicians were the same. Casa warned the government he would stand in its way if it attempted to undermine the judiciary. The live broadcast of the event on Net Television and the party's Facebook page was interrupted due to technical difficulties.

During the broader campaign, Labour sought to weaken the PN by portraying Metsola and the Nationalists as favouring increased defence spending and a potential EU army, a line of attack observers noted was complicated by Prime Minister Abela's own agreement within the European Council in March 2024 on new measures to strengthen EU defence.

=== AD+PD ===
AD+PD took a contrasting approach to the two main parties on Workers' Day, 1 May 2024, choosing to hold a press conference and meeting with bus drivers at the Valletta bus terminal rather than a mass meeting. Chairperson Sandra Gauci and secretary-general Ralph Cassar attended alongside other party officials to mark the occasion and highlight workers' rights.

=== Imperium Europa ===
Imperium Europa's campaign was led by party leader Norman Lowell, who had contested every MEP election since Malta's EU accession. According to an analysis published by LSE European Politics ahead of the election, Lowell was described as the "far-right leader of the Imperium Europa Party" and had received 8,238 first-count votes in the 2019 election, though the party had little electoral influence. Migration featured as a key area of interest for the party's campaign; LSE European Politics observed that in the 2024 cycle, concerns had shifted from irregular migration toward the presence of third-country nationals in Malta, and that political parties broadly had made little attempt to distinguish between irregular migrants, refugees, and third-country nationals. Lowell was marked as an absent invitee at several multi-party debates held during the campaign, including those of 22 March and 2 May 2024 (debates table).

=== ABBA ===
ABBA started its campaign with two events organised in conjunction with the European Christian Political Movement party on 6 April 2024 in a Qawra hotel on 'Reclaiming the power for the member states'. Two pairs of individual speakers addressed the two consecutive events which revolved around 'Sovereignty and Healthcare' and 'Education and Foreign Policy'. Romanian MEP Cristian Terheș and party leader Ivan Grech Mintoff addressed the first meeting, with Valeriu Ghilețchi and lawyer and broadcaster Emmanuel 'Emmy' Bezzina addressed the second meeting.

Four days before the election, therefore 4 June, Ivan Grech Mintoff resigned his leadership and membership of ABBA party. This comes after an open rift between Grech Mintoff and party secretary general Simon Elmer appeared on Grech Mintoff's protest method, that of egging the floor in debates he attends. Nevertheless, Grech Mintoff appeared on the ballot as a member and leader of the party.

=== Volt Malta ===
Volt's campaign began with the adoption of their joint European election programme November 2023 in Paris, which the party shares with all other parties from Volt Europa. On 1 February 2024, Volt announced its Vice President Matthias Iannis Portelli as its first (and only) candidate for the European elections.

=== Independents ===
The thirteen independent candidates represented a notably diverse range of political orientations and campaign themes. The most prominent was Arnold Cassola, a former secretary-general of a European Parliament political group who had previously contested MEP elections in 2004 as the candidate of Alternattiva Demokratika. During the 2024 campaign, Cassola centred his platform on economic reform oriented towards young people, clean and efficient public transport as an alternative to car-centric road building, and good governance. His stated objective in Brussels, as reported by MaltaToday, was to make Malta's economic and urban development serve its citizens rather than reproduce what he described as a failing status quo.

Cassola emerged as the most electorally significant independent in the race, rising to third place among all candidates in pre-election polling conducted by Esprimi/Times of Malta, polling at approximately 5.7% of first-preference votes. MaltaToday noted that such a share would, if replicated on polling day, have recalled his 2004 performance when, also as a non-mainstream candidate, he had secured approximately 22,938 first-count votes and could have proved sufficient for election given the change to a six-seat constituency since then.

Conrad Borg Manché, the mayor of Gżira who had resigned from the Labour Party in October 2023 after opposing his party's position on a planned development affecting a public garden, also contested as an independent. Borg Manché stated his campaign would centre on education, family rights, and pressing issues at both a national and European level.

Edwin Vassallo, a former Nationalist Party parliamentary secretary who had served in Parliament from 1996 to 2022, announced his candidacy as an independent, contesting under the banner of Moviment Solidarjetà, the organisation he had established after leaving the PN. Vassallo stated he had decided to contest because values of life, family and freedom had "never been as threatened as they are today". At a press conference held in front of the Maltese Parliament in May 2024, Vassallo also called for the courts to be allowed to operate without interference, arguing that excessive pressure on the judiciary amounted to an abuse of it.

=== Allegations of voter fraud ===
Maltese courts on 24 May 2024 annulled the ID card residence registration of 99 'ghost voters' who illegally changed such voter registration address to unfinished and uninhabitable flat addresses in Siġġiewi following a successful lawsuit per illegally registered voter by the Nationalist Party in opposition. It has to be noted that a fourth of these voters were already Siggiewi residents and their change in address would not have had any impact on the locality in which they were going to vote. The legal battle involved 22 magistrates and took three weeks. This led to housing minister Roderick Galdes being disparagingly titled 'Electoral Fraud Minister' by Opposition-affiliated media NET. This heavily implicates that the Labour Party stood to benefit from such voter address registration changes with also a win for said Labour Party further consolidated as such.

====== Voting cards issued to deceased voters ======
Ex-ABBA leader Ivan Grech Mintoff alleged in a debate on Maltese national broadcaster Television Malta that a voter who has been dead for two years has been issued a voting card for the 2024 election, stating "F'din l-elezzjoni ħa jerġgħu jivvotaw il-mejtin" (English: In this election, dead people are going to vote again). Newsbook confirmed said deceased voter's identity and document and stated that such cases were not isolated. The Electoral Commission did not answer questions sent by Newsbook on these concerns.

Similarly in August 2023, a whistleblower made claims that deceased people's identities were used to vote for the Labour Party in the 2022 general election.

== Debates ==
2024 Maltese European Parliament Election debates
Date	Time	Organizers	P Present A Absent invitee N Non-invitee							
Date	Time	Organizers	Labour	Nationalist	IE	AD+PD	ABBA	Volt	Independents	Refs
21 February	13:00	National Youth Council of Malta	N	P Norma Camilleri LouisAnne Pulis	N	P Ralph Cassar Mina Tolu	N	N	N	
13 March	12:30	National Youth Council of Malta	P Steve Ellul	P Peter Agius	N	P Ralph Cassar	N	N	Arnold Cassola	
22 March	12:00	JEF Malta	P Alex Agius Saliba Steve Ellul	P Peter Agius Norma Camilleri	A Norman Lowell	P Sandra Gauci	P Ivan Grech Mintoff	P Matthias Iannis Portelli	Arnold Cassola	
3 April	13:00	National Youth Council of Malta	P Thomas Bajada	P Lee Bugeja Bartolo	N	P Sandra Gauci	N	P Matthias Iannis Portelli	Arnold Cassola	
12 April	9:05	Malta Chamber of Commerce	P Thomas Bajada	P Norma Camilleri	P Terrence Portelli	N	N	N	N	
12 April	9:55	Malta Chamber of Commerce	P Steve Ellul	P David Agius	N	P Ralph Cassar	N	N	N	
24 April	8:30	Malta Chamber of Commerce	P Steve Ellul	P Peter Agius	N	N	N	N	Arnold Cassola	
2 May	12:30	MUDU Party Leaders Debate - University of Malta	P Daniel Attard Marija Sara Vella Gafà	P Peter Agius Miriana Calleja Testaferrata de Noto	A Norman Lowell OR Terrence Portelli	P (Note: Attended but left midway.) Mina Tolu	P (Note: Attended but left after first question.) Ivan Grech Mintoff	N	Arnold Cassola; James Ryder; Conrad Borg Manché (Note: Was not part of the debate but was granted 2 minutes floor time.)	
10 May	16:00	National Youth Council of Malta MaltaDaily	P Daniel Attard Steve Ellul Thomas Bajada	P Norma Camilleri Lee Bugeja Bartolo A Peter Agius	P Terrence Portelli	P Sandra Gauci Mina Tolu Ralph Cassar	P Ivan Grech Mintoff A Tania Gauci Fiorini	P Matthias Iannis Portelli	Arnold Cassola; James Ryder	
14 May	17:00	LovinMalta MaltaToday	P Steve Ellul	P Lee Bugeja Bartolo	N	P Ralph Cassar	N	P Matthias Iannis Portelli	Simon Mercieca	
17 May	9:00	Malta Chamber of Commerce	N	N	N	N	A Ivan Grech Mintoff	P Matthias Iannis Portelli	Simon Mercieca; Radu Gheorghe	
17 May	10:00	Malta Chamber of Commerce	N	N	N	N	N	N	Malcolm Bezzina; James Ryder; Alexander D'Agata; Stephen Florian	
21 May	11:55	Newsbook/RTK	P Steve Ellul	P LouisAnne Pulis	N	N	P Ivan Grech Mintoff	N	Edwin Vassallo	
21 May	17:00	LovinMalta MaltaToday	P Thomas Bajada	P Norma Camilleri	N	P Ralph Cassar	N	P Matthias Iannis Portelli	Arnold Cassola	
22 May	21:00	TVM	N						Nazzareno Bonniċi ('tal-Ajkla'); Edwin Vassallo; James Michael Muscat; Simon Mercieca; Alexander D'Agata; Radu Gheorghi; Stephen Florian; Conrad Borg Manché; Noel Apap; Malcolm Bezzina; Adrian Zammit	
28 May	12:00	Newsbook/RTK	P Alex Agius Saliba	P David Agius	N	P Mina Tolu	N	P Matthias Iannis Portelli	James Ryder	

== Opinion polls ==
It is not uncommon for smaller parties to be grouped together or excluded in polls by Maltese media houses.

	Polling firm	Sample size		Partit Nazzjonalista	Imperium Europa	ADPD	ABBA		IND/ Others	Lead	Not voting (Note: Excluded from calculation for the party percentages.)	Don't know/ Invalid
30 May–4 June 2024	L-Orizzont (Note: Sister newspaper of 'It-Torċa', a GWU-owned newspaper, closely aligned to the Labour Party.)	1,800	50.9	40.1	3.5	5.5				10.8	31	33 Invalid
22 May–4 June 2024	MaltaToday (Note: Survey was candidate based, thus the quantity in 'Other' will definitely include parties listed here and might overflow 100%. Percentages brought about by combining candidate first-preference vote shares. Thus the lead percentage and winning party may not be realistic.)	1,007	43.3	48.1	1.9	0.6	-	-	6.2	4.8	–	
3–10 May 2024	MaltaToday	657	49.4	41.7	8.9					7.7	30.6	–
6–10 May 2024	It-Torċa (Note: Sister newspaper of 'L-Orizzont', a GWU-owned newspaper, closely aligned to the Labour Party.)	1,000	51.5	40.3	5.1	4.1				11.2	31	–
15–24 April 2024	MaltaToday	656	50.7	44.2	5.1					6.5	29	–
1–13 April 2024	Esprimi	600	45.4	38.0	3.2	13.4				7.4	–	41.0
7 March - 21 March 2024	MaltaToday	657	52.8	42.6	4.6					10.2	23.4	–
27 Feb – 12 Mar 2024	Esprimi/Times of Malta	600	52.4	39.3	8.3					13.1	33	–
26 Jan–05 Feb 2024	MaltaToday	647	47.9	41.0	11.1					6.9	37.5	–
26 Mar 2022	2022 Maltese general election	–	55.1	41.7	n/a	1.6	0.5	0.1	0.4	13.4	24.4	2.9
25 May 2019	2019 European Parliament election in Malta	–	54.3	37.9	3.17	2.7 (Note: Combined result of Democratic Alternative and Democratic Party vote shares before party merger)	0.5 (Note: As Alliance for Change)	n/a	1.2	16.4	27.3	2.6

== Results ==
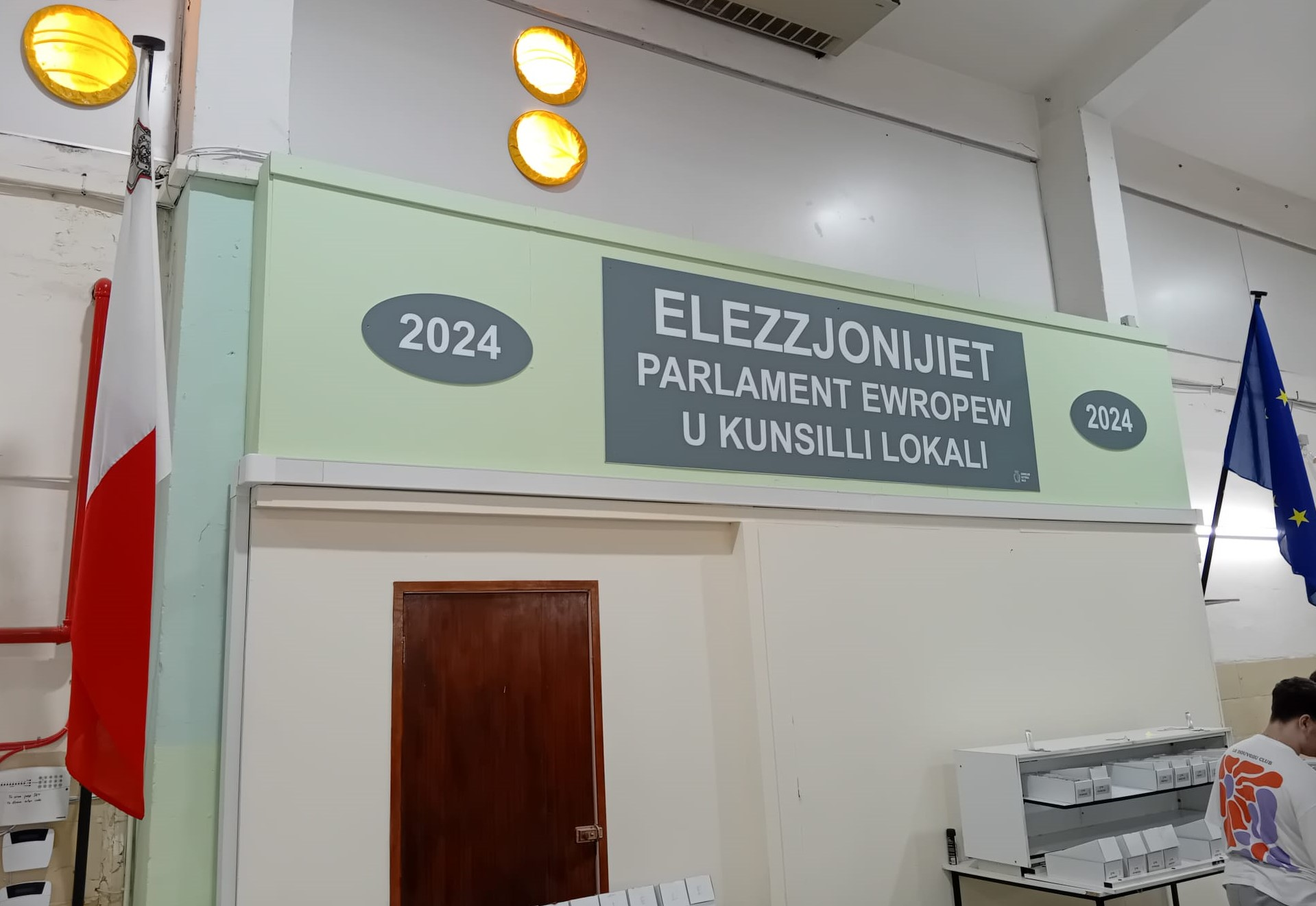
The Maltese electoral office in Naxxar

Polls opened and closed on 8 June at 7am and 10pm CET respectively. Following the closing of the polls, all ballot boxes were sealed and transported to the vote counting complex in Naxxar. The count was conducted between 9.30am and 10pm when the results were revealed.

Heavy speculation on whether the supermajority lead that the Labour Party has over the Nationalist Party will prevail or not dominated Maltese media reports. Final reports showed that the Labour Party won the election again, however at the expense of its majority decimated to 8,500 votes.

Party	Votes	%	+/–	Seats	+/–
Labour Party	117,805	45.26	–9.03	3	–1
Nationalist Party	109,351	42.02	+7.12	3	+1
Arnold Cassola	12,706	4.88	+3.69	0	0
Imperium Europa	6,816	2.62	–0.55	0	0
Conrad Borg Manché	5,936	2.28	New	0	New
AD+PD	3,109	1.19	–1.56	0	0
ABBA	527	0.20	–0.26	0	0
Volt Malta	298	0.11	New	0	New
Other Independents	3,710	1.43	+1.22	0	New
Total	260,258	100.00	–	6	0
Valid votes	260,258	96.34			
Invalid/blank votes	9,884	3.66			
Total votes	270,142	100.00			
Registered voters/turnout	370,184	72.98			
Source: Electoral Commission of Malta

=== By candidate ===
Count #	Candidate	Party	FPV (Note: First-preference votes)	FPV% (Note: Calculated based on the number of valid votes: 260,258)	Outcome
1	Roberta Metsola	Nationalist	87,473	33.61%	Elected through first-preference votes
1	Alex Agius Saliba	Labour	63,899	24.55%	Elected through first-preference votes
3	George Grixti	Independent	20	0.01%	Eliminated with 22 transferred votes
4	Malcolm Bezzina	Independent	37	0.01%	Eliminated with 40 transferred votes
5	Radu Gheorghi	Independent	50	0.02%	Eliminated with 56 transferred votes
6	Stephen Florian	Independent	57	0.02%	Eliminated with 69 transferred votes
7	Alexander D'Agata	Independent	84	0.03%	Eliminated with 98 transferred votes
8	Noel Apap	Independent	143	0.05%	Eliminated with 154 transferred votes
9	Terrence Portelli	Imperium Europa	147	0.06%	Eliminated with 158 transferred votes
10	Mina Tolu	AD+PD	187	0.07%	Eliminated with 215 transferred votes
11	Ivan Grech Mintoff	ABBA	220	0.08%	Eliminated with 232 transferred votes
12	Simon Mercieca	Independent	232	0.09%	Eliminated with 281 transferred votes
13	Nazzareno Bonniċi	Independent	206	0.08%	Eliminated with 289 transferred votes
14	Matthias Iannis Portelli	Volt Malta	298	0.11%	Eliminated with 343 transferred votes
15	Rachelle Deguara	AD+PD	286	0.11%	Eliminated with 369 transferred votes
16	Tania Gauci Fiorini	ABBA	307	0.12%	Eliminated with 468 transferred votes
17	Ralph Cassar	AD+PD	474	0.18%	Eliminated with 715 transferred votes
18	Adrian Zammit	Independent	579	0.22%	Eliminated with 722 transferred votes
19	Jesmond Marshall	Labour	685	0.26%	Eliminated with 873 transferred votes
20	Edwin Vassallo	Independent	717	0.28%	Eliminated with 902 transferred votes
21	Miriana Calleja Testaferrata de Noto	Nationalist	460	0.18%	Eliminated with 1,130 transferred votes
22	Jesmond Bonello	Labour	858	0.33%	Eliminated with 1,264 transferred votes
23	Lee Bugeja Bartolo	Nationalist	677	0.26%	Eliminated with 1,697 transferred votes
24	Louis Anne Pulis	Nationalist	657	0.25%	Eliminated with 1,896 transferred votes
25	James Muscat	Independent	1,585	0.61%	Eliminated with 2,244 transferred votes
26	Sandra Gauci	AD+PD	2,162	0.83%	Eliminated with 3,603 transferred votes
27	Norma Camilleri	Nationalist	1,132	0.43%	Eliminated with 3,964 transferred votes
28	Marija Sara Vella Gafà	Labour	3,442	1.32%	Eliminated with 5,245 transferred votes
29	Conrad Borg Manché	Independent	5,936	2.28%	Eliminated with 7,641 transferred votes
30	Norman Lowell	Imperium Europa	6,669	2.56%	Eliminated with 8,577 transferred votes
31	Clint Azzopardi Flores	Labour	7,482	2.87%	Eliminated with 12,951 transferred votes
32	David Agius	Nationalist	5,851	2.25%	Eliminated with 15,840 transferred votes
33	Steve Ellul	Labour	9,643	3.71%	Eliminated with 17,846 transferred votes
34	Arnold Cassola	Independent	12,706	4.88%	Eliminated with 22,941 transferred votes
35	Peter Agius	Nationalist	9,418	3.62%	Elected with 38,236 transferred votes
35	David Casa	Nationalist	3,683	1.42%	Elected with 37,623 transferred votes
37	Daniel Attard	Labour	11,703	4.50%	Elected with 34,764 transferred votes
37	Thomas Bajada	Labour	10,792	4.15%	Elected with 25,047 transferred votes
37	Claudette Abela Baldacchino	Labour	9,301	3.57%	Eliminated with 24,493 transferred votes
