= Malta (European Parliament constituency) =

Constituency of the European Parliament

- European Parliament constituency
- Location among the current constituencies
- Member state: Malta
- Created: 2004
- MEPs: 5 (2004–2011); 6 (2011–present)

Malta is a European Parliament constituency for elections in the European Union covering the member state of Malta. It is currently represented by six Members of the European Parliament. The electoral system used is single transferable vote.

== Members of the European Parliament ==
Election	MEP (party)	MEP (party)	MEP (party)	MEP (party)	MEP (party)	MEP (party)
2004	Simon Busuttil (Nationalist)	David Casa (Nationalist)	5 Seats	John Attard Montalto (Labour)	Louis Grech (Labour)	Joseph Muscat (Labour)
2009	Simon Busuttil (Nationalist)	David Casa (Nationalist)	Edward Scicluna (Labour)	John Attard Montalto (Labour)	Louis Grech (Labour)	Joseph Cuschieri (Labour)
2013	Roberta Metsola (Nationalist)	David Casa (Nationalist)	Claudette Abela Baldacchino (Labour)	John Attard Montalto (Labour)	Marlene Mizzi (Labour)	Joseph Cuschieri (Labour)
2014	Roberta Metsola (Nationalist)	David Casa (Nationalist)	Therese Comodini Cachia (Nationalist)	Miriam Dalli (Labour)	Marlene Mizzi (Labour)	Alfred Sant (Labour)
2017	Roberta Metsola (Nationalist)	David Casa (Nationalist)	Francis Zammit Dimech (Nationalist)	Miriam Dalli (Labour)	Marlene Mizzi (Labour)	Alfred Sant (Labour)
2019	Roberta Metsola (Nationalist)	David Casa (Nationalist)	Josianne Cutajar (Labour)	Miriam Dalli (Labour)	Alex Agius Saliba (Labour)	Alfred Sant (Labour)
2020	Roberta Metsola (Nationalist)	David Casa (Nationalist)	Josianne Cutajar (Labour)	Cyrus Engerer (Labour)	Alex Agius Saliba (Labour)	Alfred Sant (Labour)
2024	Roberta Metsola (Nationalist)	David Casa (Nationalist)	Peter Agius (Nationalist)	Daniel Attard (Labour)	Alex Agius Saliba (Labour)	Thomas Bajada (Labour)

== Elections ==
=== 2004 ===
The 2004 European election was the sixth election to the European Parliament. As Malta had only joined the European Union earlier that month, it was the first European election held in that state. The election took place on 13 June 2004.

=== 2009 ===
The 2009 European election was the seventh election to the European Parliament and the second for Malta.

=== 2014 ===
The 2014 European election was the eighth election to the European Parliament and the third for Malta.

=== 2019 ===
The 2019 European election was the ninth election to the European Parliament and the fourth for Malta.

=== 2024 ===
The 2024 European election will be the tenth election to the European Parliament and the fifth for Malta.
