= Mina Tolu =

Maltese politician, LGBTQI activist and feminist

Mina Jack Tolu
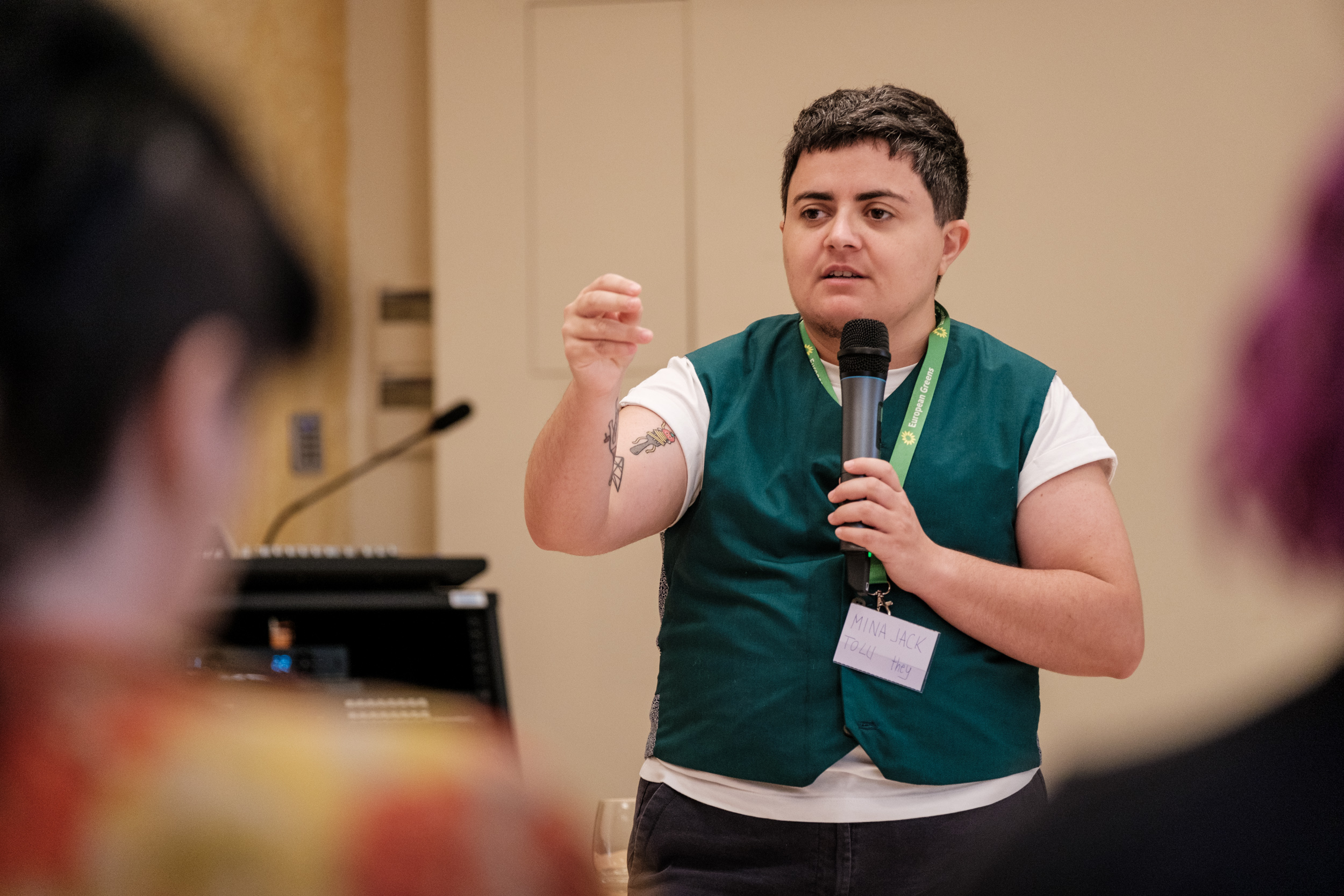

Deputy Chairperson of AD+PD
- In office 28 May 2023 – 24 May 2025 Serving with Carmel Cacopardo
- Leader: Sandra Gauci

Co-Spokesperson of Federation of Young European Greens (FYEG)
- In office August 2019 – June 2021

Personal details
- Born: Romina Tolu; 31 August 1991 (age 35) Malta
- Party: AD+PD (2020-present)
- Other political affiliations: Democratic Alternative (before 2020)
- Education: University of Malta (BA, MA); George Mason University (M.Sc)
- Occupation: Politician, political activist, LGBTQI activism, environmental activist
- Website: https://minatolu.com/

Mina Jack Tolu (born 31 August 1991) is a Maltese politician, activist who champions LGBTQIA causes and is a green activist who has campaigned to raise awareness of transgender rights and gender equality in Europe. They ran for the 2019 European Parliament election in Malta. Tolu served as deputy chairperson of AD+PD and was co-spokesperson of the Federation of Young European Greens.

== Early life ==
Tolu and their twin sibling, Ludo Tolu, were born on 31 August 1991 to a Maltese family of Italian descent. Together, they founded the Maltese Student Organisation, "We Are", in 2010. Tolu's father, Giancarlo Tolu, is a Maltese sportsman who broke a Guinness World Record in bowling in 2004 and represented Malta at the European Senior Bowling Championships and the Senior World Cup.

Tolu graduated with a Bachelor of Communications (Hons) from the University of Malta in 2014. Their dissertation project consisted of the creation of a comic meant to reach out to the LGBT young adult audience. The comic was aimed at the Maltese audience, where literature of this type is limited. Tolu also holds a Masters in Conflict Resolution and Mediterranean Security from the University of Malta, and a Masters in Conflict Analysis and Resolution from George Mason University.

== Activism ==
=== Youth and student activism ===
While at University, Mina was elected as one of the student representatives for the faculty of Media and Knowledge Sciences, and contested the 2014 student council elections with Pulse.

=== LGBTQI activism ===
Tolu began advocating for LGBTQIA rights in 2010, starting with the foundation of "We Are – LGBTQQI Youth and Student Organisation" at the University of Malta.

From 2014 to 2015, Tolu was a board member and co-chair of the International LGBTQIA Youth and Student Organization (IGLYO). They were IGLYO's candidate for the Council of Europe Advisory Council of Youth during 2016 and 2017. They were elected to the Advisory Council of Youth where they worked on portfolios of mental health, counter-narratives and "no hate speech". In 2015, Tolu joined the staff team of Transgender Europe (TGEU) as communications officer.

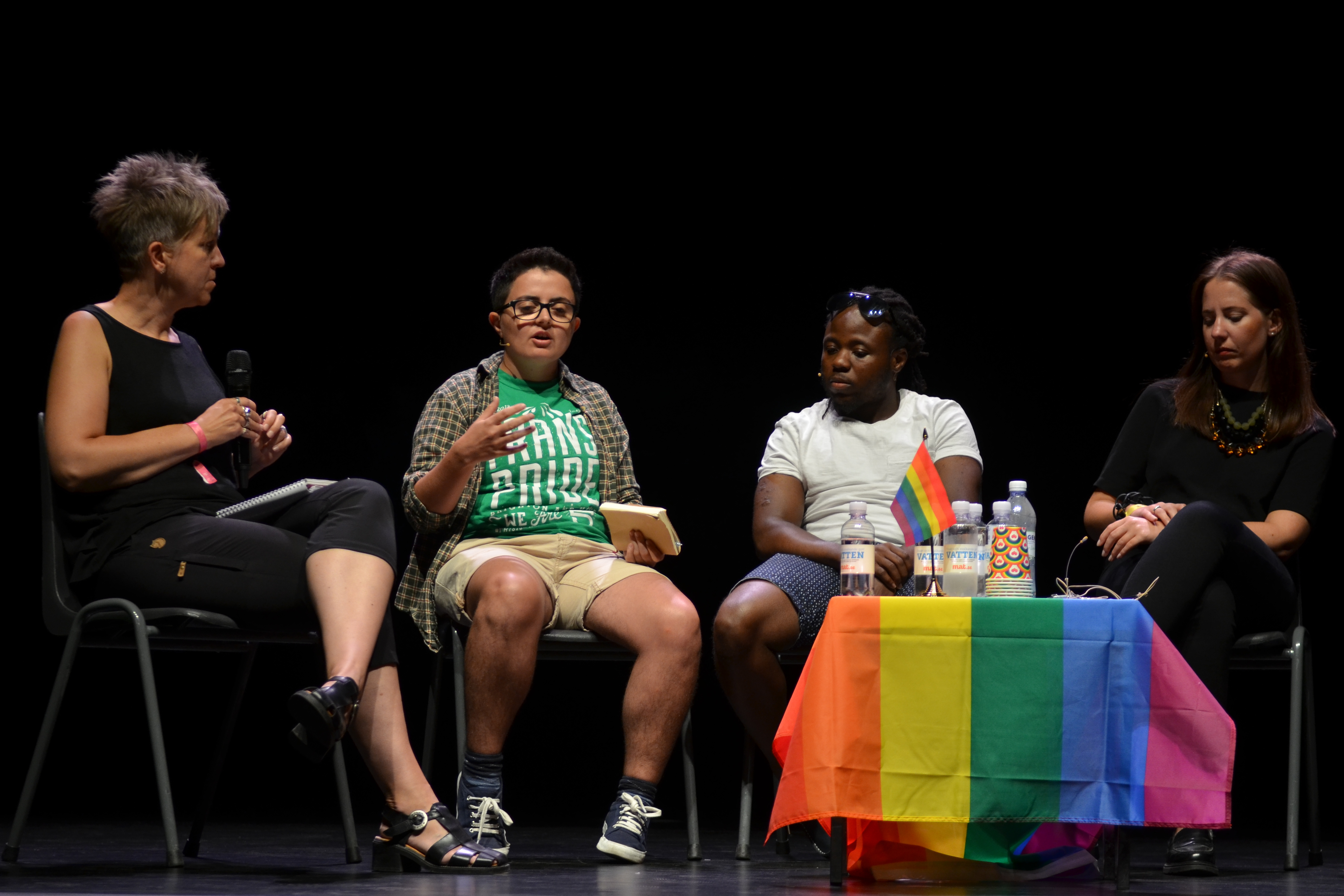
Mina Tolu at the Human Rights Conference at Stockholm Pride 2018

In 2016, Tolu represented Malta at One Young World Summit in Ottawa, Canada. They delivered a speech on trans rights and was a member on a panel about gender equality. Tolu spoke about challenging gender stereotypes, gender-neutral pronouns and stressed the need for gender equality to include transgender and gender-non-conforming people. During their speech on trans rights and violence against trans people at the One Young World Summit, Tolu spoke about TGEU's Trans Murder Monitoring project and called on the One Young World community fighting similar forms of discrimination, violence and hatred towards diversity to unite together and bring change in all these communities.

In 2018, Mina Tolu joined the Women Deliver Young Leaders program, which is a global advocacy program that develops youth activists to work for gender equality and women's rights. They returned to local activism in Malta by joining the Pride Week events in the run-up to Malta Pride 2018. In August 2018, Tolu joined the Human Rights Conference at Euro Pride held in Stockholm.

=== Environmental activism ===
In 2015, Tolu coordinated the national referendum campaign "SHOut" - Spring Hunting Out (No campaign) for the Maltese environmental NGO BirdLife Malta that aimed to abolish spring bird hunting in Malta. The result of the vote was a slim victory for the "Yes" campaign of 2,220 votes.

== Political career ==
Tolu contested the 2019 European Parliament election in Malta as a candidate for Alternattiva Demokratika (AD). During the campaign, Tolu called for a respectful debate on abortion, a stance that triggered a public dispute with former party leader Arnold Cassola. The disagreement led to Cassola's resignation from the party, with Tolu stating they felt used as a "scapegoat" for long-standing internal divisions.

Following the merger of AD and the Democratic Party to form AD+PD in 2020, Tolu assumed the role of International Secretary. In June 2022, they were elected to the committee of the European Green Party, becoming the first Maltese representative to serve in the executive body of the European Greens.

Tolu served as the Deputy Chairperson of AD+PD from 2023 to 2025. They stood again as a candidate in the 2024 European Parliament election in Malta, campaigning on issues of human rights, environmental justice, and the rule of law. In 2025, Tolu was elected as the party's Treasurer.

== Recognition ==
Mina Tolu was nominated and won the student award at the first LGBTQIA Community Awards in Malta, 2014. Their twin, Ludo Tolu, won the same award. In the same year, they were awarded Kokka Attiva by the University Student Council for their work as a student at the University of Malta and was nominated for a JCI Malta young leader award.

== Personal life ==
Tolu is non-binary and uses they/them pronouns in English and masculine pronouns in Maltese.

Their father, Giancarlo Tolu, is a sportsman who has represented Malta in international bowling competitions.
