= Peter Agius =

Maltese politician (born 1979)

Peter Agius MEP
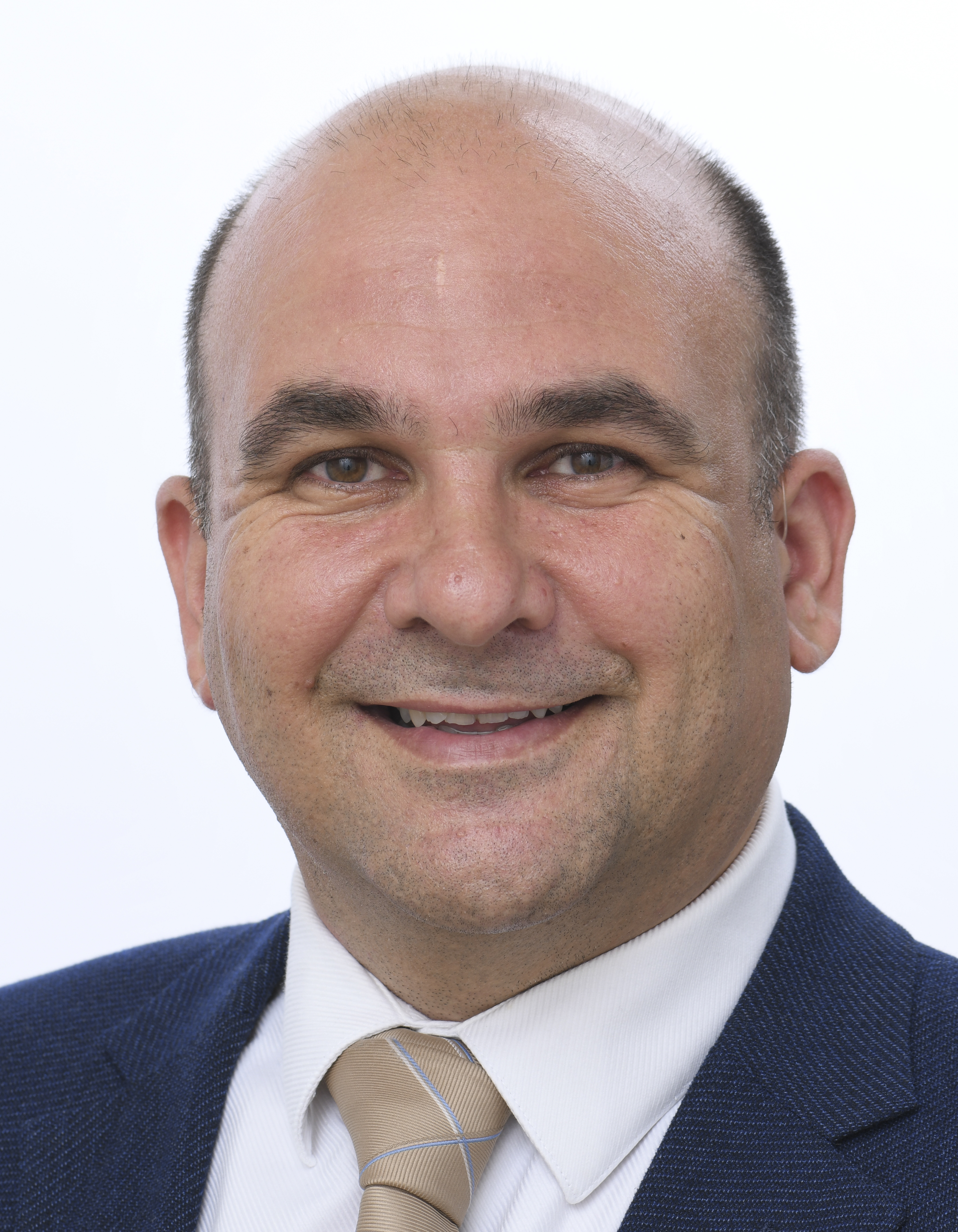

Member of the European Parliament
- Incumbent
- Assumed office 16 July 2024
- Constituency: Malta

Personal details
- Born: 9 April 1979 (age 47) St. Julian's, Malta
- Party: Malta; Nationalist Party; EU; European People's Party

Peter Agius (born 9 April 1979 in St. Julian's) is a Maltese politician and lawyer who has served as a Member of the European Parliament (MEP) for Malta since 2024. He is a member of Malta's Nationalist Party (PN), part of the EPP Group.

== Biography ==
Agius was born on 9 April 1979 in St. Julian's, Malta. He obtained a B.A. in Legal and Humanistic Studies in 2000 and Doctorate of Laws (LL.D.) in 2003, both from the University of Malta. In 2006, he obtained a Master of Laws (LL.M.) in European Law from the Université libre de Bruxelles.

Agius began his career with freelance translation work for Malta's Law Drafting Unit before joining the Legal Service of the Council of the European Union in Brussels in 2002, ahead of Malta's EU accession. His early work included revising the Maltese-language version of the EU treaties, and he subsequently participated in negotiations with the European Parliament on internal market legislation.

Since 2004 Agius was a visiting lecturer at the University of Malta and published research on European affairs. In 2010, he published a textbook on the translation of European law into Maltese language.

In 2008, Agius became a political adviser to the rotating presidencies of the Council, assisting with negotiations on matters including services, professional qualifications, and betting and gaming. From 2009, he also assisted the cabinet of Herman Van Rompuy, then President of the European Council, on internal market issues.

In July 2012, Agius became head of the European Parliament's information office in Malta.

In February 2017, he joined the cabinet of Antonio Tajani, then President of the European Parliament, working as speechwriter.

Agius contested the 2019 European Parliament election in Malta as a Nationalist Party candidate. He received approximately 10,500 first-count votes but was not elected, as the party secured two seats rather than the three it had held previously. He subsequently remained active in Maltese politics.

In June 2020, Agius was appointed the Nationalist Party's representative within the European People's Party (EPP).

Agius subsequently served as a spokesperson for the Nationalist Party ahead of the 2022 Maltese general election. In January 2023, the PN Executive Committee unanimously approved his candidacy for the following year's European Parliament election.

Agius contested the 2024 European Parliament election in Malta as a Nationalist Party candidate and was elected to the European Parliament, succeeding on his second attempt. He received 9,418 first-count votes, with subsequent preference transfers enabling him to secure a seat. He was elected alongside fellow PN candidates Roberta Metsola and David Casa, giving the party three of Malta's six seats. His term began on 16 July 2024.

Peter Agius is married with a Maltese translator at the EU Council. They have children. They own a maisonette in Mosta, Malta which hosts both their official residence and their campaign office, after having sold their previous home in Attard. They usually reside in Brussels.

== Publications ==
- Aspects of Interpretation of Multilingual Acquis Communautaire, Id-Dritt 2006 Volume XIX
