= Daniel Attard =

Maltese politician

Daniel Attard MEP
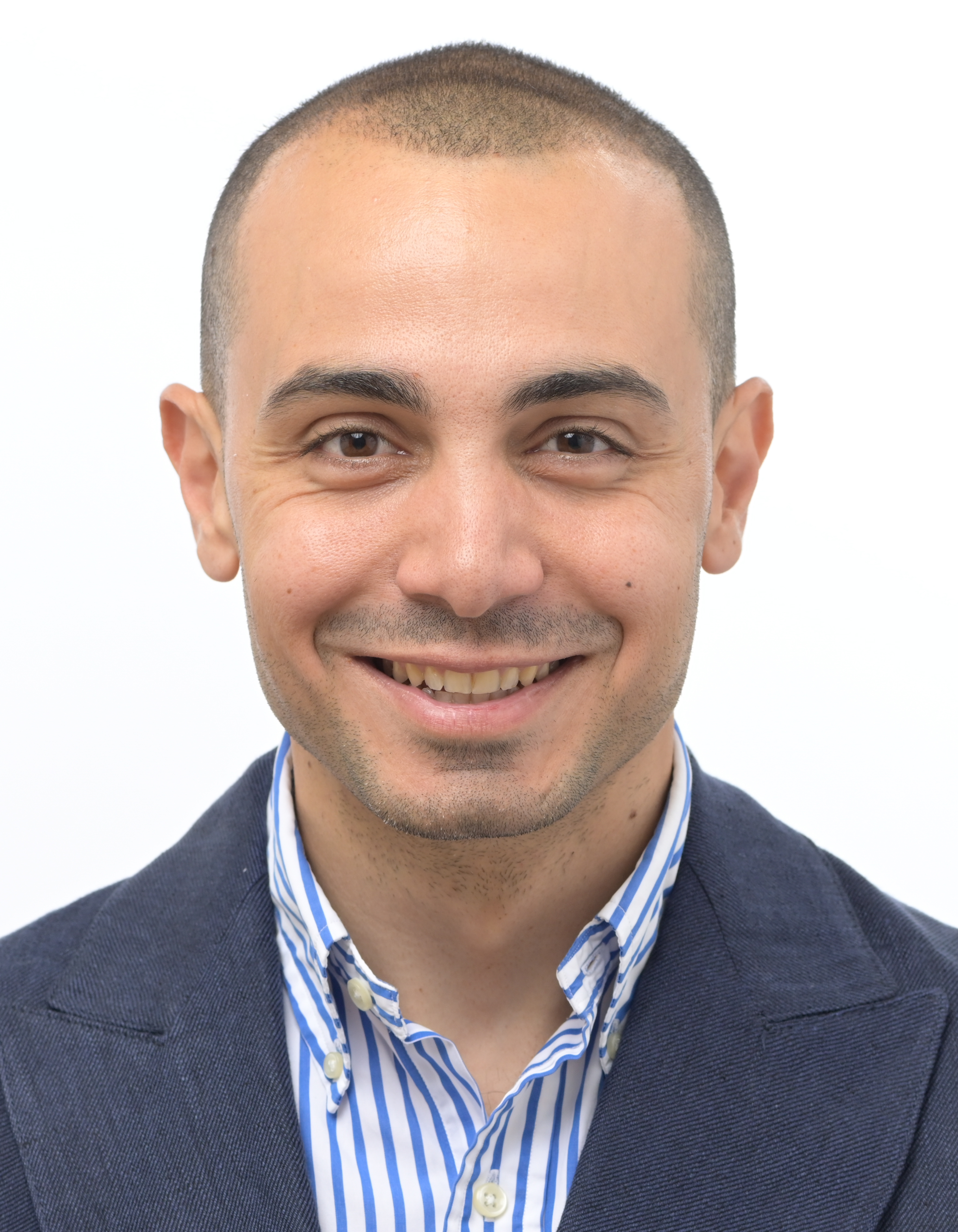

Member of the European Parliament for Malta
- Incumbent
- Assumed office 16 July 2024

Mayor of Mtarfa
- In office 2013–2021
- Preceded by: Anton Mifsud
- Succeeded by: Kyle Mifsud

Personal details
- Born: 1992 (age 33–34) Pietà
- Party: Partit Laburista
- Spouse: Annalise Attard (2021)
- Education: University of Malta (LL.D.)

Daniel Attard (born 18 April 1992 in Pietà) is a Maltese politician for the Labour Party. He served as mayor of Mtarfa from 2013 to 2021 and is a member of the European Parliament since July 2024.

== Studies and personal life ==
Attard studied law at the University of Malta, obtaining a Bachelor of Arts degree in 2014, a diploma in notarial studies in 2015 and a Doctor of Laws degree in 2017. He was admitted to the Maltese bar in 2018.Daniel Attard married in 2021 Annalise Attard, a pharmacist and director at the Malta Medicines Authority. She was given special permission to retain her post and work from London, where she joined her husband there in 2021-2022.

== Political career and diplomatic appointments ==
Attard started his political career while still enrolled at university, with positions in the Labour Party's media arm, in ministerial cabinets, in local politics and in diplomatic missions of Malta abroad.

In the early 2010s, Attard worked as a reporter for One TV, the Labour Party's station.

Following the 2013 Maltese local elections, Attard took the post of mayor of Mtarfa, where he served until 2021.

In the meantime, following the parallel Labour electoral victory in 2013, Attard also joined the secretariat of minister Helena Dalli.

During his master's studies, Attard joined Malta’s diplomatic mission to the United Nations in Geneva for a year in 2016-2017 as a technical attaché to the International Labour Organization, and the Permanent Representation to the European Union around 2017-2018, to then work at Malta's European Affairs Ministery until around 2020.

Attard had also been employed as a legal adviser to the Malta Medicines Authority from July 2019 until May 2021.

Around 2020-2021, Attard served as spokesperson for Foreign and European Affairs Minister Evarist Bartolo.

In June 2021, Attard was appointed as Deputy High Commissioner in London, where he joined former minister Manuel Mallia. Attard's appointment in London attracted scrutiny due to his limited diplomatic experience and because he retained his position as mayor of Mtarfa, leading the local council online from London. Attard left the diplomatic post in London and returned to Malta after only one year, in June 2022.

== Member of the European Parliament ==
In July 2023, Attard was approved as a candidate for the 2024 European elections, with the support of party leader and Prime Minister Robert Abela. He secured the second seat for the Labour Party, receiving 11,703 first-preference votes, and took office on 16 July 2024.

During his election campaign, Attard highlighted consumer rights, workers' rights, minority rights, European sovereignty and neutrality, and opposition to the 'militarisation' of Europe.

During the campaign, Attard expressed strong support for former prime minister Joseph Muscat, who had been charged in connection with allegations arising from the investigation into the hospitals concession to Vitals Global Healthcare. Muscat and his wife, Michelle Muscat, publicly endorsed Attard's candidacy. Attard's support for Muscat became a prominent feature of his campaign. In a video recounted by Muscat at a campaign event, Attard said that he would defend Muscat if Muscat swore that he had done nothing wrong, which he did. Attard also publicly questioned the conduct of the magisterial inquiry into the hospitals concession. During the campaign, he pledged to seek justice for Muscat and others whom he considered to have been unfairly accused, saying that he would stand alongside them in his capacity as a lawyer. In comments broadcast on Labour television, he described what he regarded as political persecution and said that he would oppose it.

In May 2025, President of the European Parliament Roberta Metsola requested that Attard's parliamentary immunity be lifted with regard to a bribery investigation involving Huawei. Belgian prosecutors later acknowledged that the person allegedly benefitting from gifts from Huawei had been a namesake, the mayor of Għasri Daniel Attard. In June 2026, the European Parliament voted not to waive Attard's immunity.

Starting from January 2026, Attard started calling for tougher EU sanctions against Iran, including to designate the Islamic Revolutionary Guards Corps as a terrorist organisation.
