= Abortion in Malta =

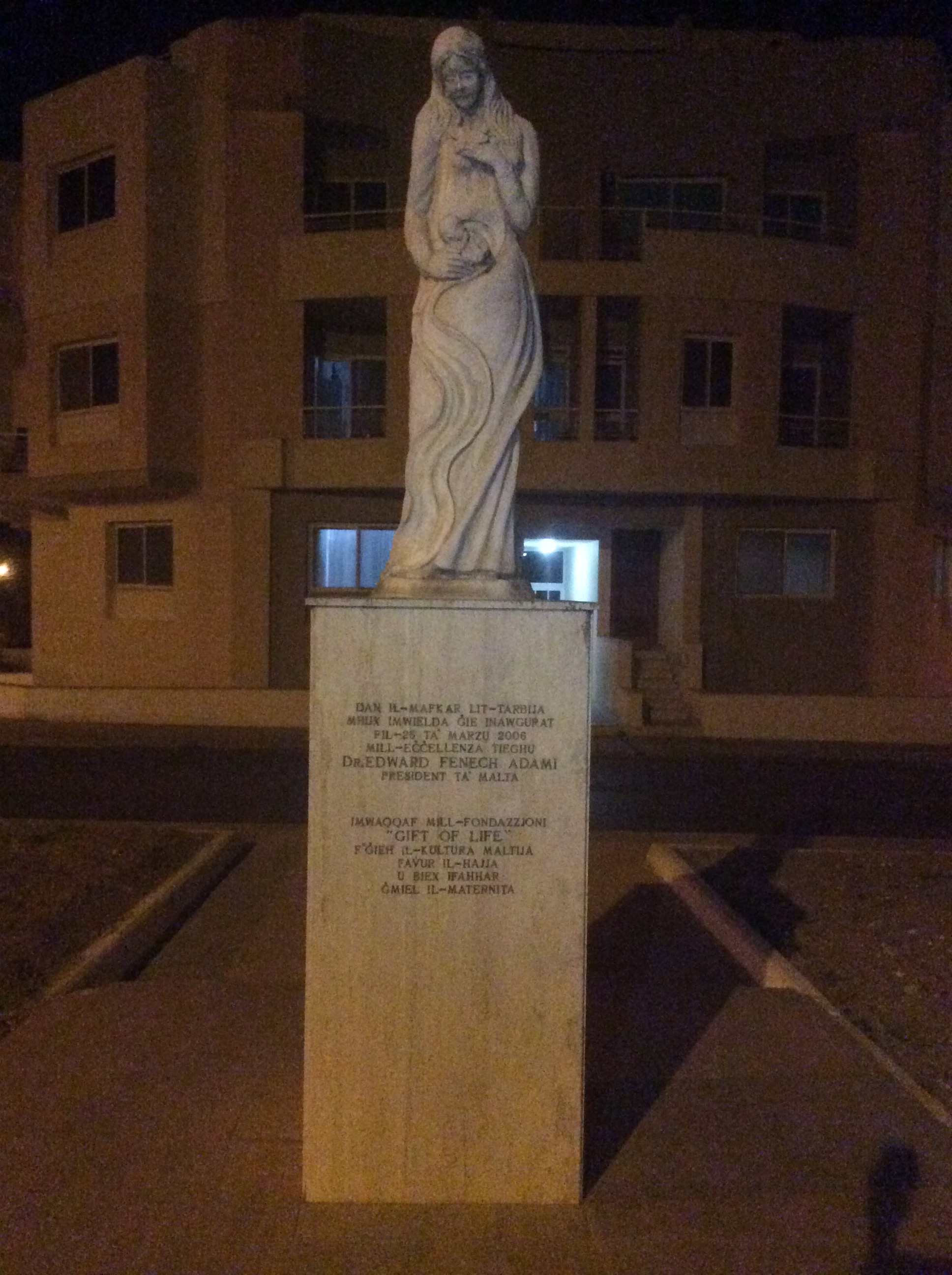
Monument for the unborn child on a main road between Mosta and Naxxar, dedicated by President Eddie Fenech Adami.

Abortion in Malta is illegal except in cases where the life of the pregnant woman is at risk. Until 2023, it was illegal without exception. Malta has the most restrictive laws regarding abortion in Europe (alongside Andorra, Liechtenstein, Monaco, Poland and Vatican City) with the law in Malta held to be influenced by Roman Catholic Christianity, which formed part of the identity of 82% of the population according to the 2021 census.

Treatment to end an ectopic pregnancy is allowed through a medical protocol which allows for each situation to be considered individually in line with the double effect principle i.e. not causing intentional harm to the pregnant woman or her unborn child.

== Law on abortion ==
The Criminal Code of Malta was first introduced in 1854 and includes abortion, which was not previously lawful, within sections for crimes against the person (in Article 218) and the administration or supplying of substances considered "poisonous or injurious to health" (in Articles 241–243).

In addition to the strong influence of the Catholic Church, Malta was under British administration when the Code was introduced; abortion had been previously outlawed by statute in England and Wales under Lord Ellenborough's Act in 1803 and the subsequent Offences Against the Person Acts in 1828 and 1837.

Article 241, on procuring miscarriage, states that anyone who causes the miscarriage of "any woman with child" by any food, drink, medicine, or by violence, or by any other means, shall be liable, on conviction, to imprisonment for a term from eighteen months to three years. The same law applies to any woman who procures her own miscarriage, or who has consented to the use of the means by which the miscarriage is procured.

In addition, the Criminal Code prohibits:

- causing death or grievous bodily harm by means used for miscarriage (Article 242);
- knowingly prescribing or administering the means whereby the miscarriage is procured (Article 243);
- culpable miscarriage i.e. by imprudence, carelessness, unskilfulness, or non-observance of regulations (Article 243A); and
- grievous bodily harm committed on a woman with child which causes a miscarriage, as an aggravated offence (Article 218(1)(c)).

The law on culpable miscarriage was introduced in 2002 as part of a revision of the criminal law.

A further amendment of the Code (Article 243B), in 2023, clarified the exceptional circumstances in which abortion is permitted, for 'saving the life and protecting the health of a pregnant woman' where she is 'suffering from a medical complication' which may place her:

- life at immediate risk; or
- health in a situation of grave jeopardy which may lead to death.

This exemption only applies when, after having considered current medical practices in Malta, 'circumstances of necessity still subsist which dictate that the medical intervention be carried out.'

In cases where the life of the woman may be at immediate risk, the intervention is legal when in the reasonable opinion of the medical practitioner carrying out the intervention, the foetus has not reached the period of viability.

In cases where the health of a pregnant woman may be in grave jeopardy which may lead to death, three additional conditions also apply: the reasonable opinion of the medical team being that the foetus has not reached the period of viability and cannot be delivered according to the standards of the medical profession; the medical intervention being carried out 'only after the medical team has confirmed its necessity; and the intervention being carried out in a licensed hospital having the facilities required for the necessary intervention.

Under the Protocol No.7 of the Treaty of Accession for Malta's admission to the European Union in 2004, EU treaties or legislation are not permitted to "affect the application in the territory of Malta of national legislation relating to abortion."

== Proposals ==
In 2005, Deputy Prime Minister Tonio Borg (a member of the Nationalist Party) sought to amend the Constitution of Malta to include a prohibition on abortion. As it stands, the Constitution states, in article 33(1) that no person shall intentionally be deprived of his life "save in execution of the sentence of a court in respect of a criminal offence under the law of Malta of which he has been convicted." Capital punishment in Malta was abolished by law in 2000.

The Malta Charter on the Dignity, Rights, Protection and Development of the Unborn Child was published in 2007 with an introduction by the then President of Malta, Eddie Fenech Adami, and support from 45 affiliated organisations, including the Nationalist Party, the Labour Party, and several voluntary organisations. The charter outlines recommendations and roles for parents, government, the medical profession, the media, the alcohol and tobacco sectors, employers and managers, children's social services to protect life before and after birth.

In 2018, Carmel Cacopardo, then leader of Democratic Alternative (a minor opposition party), stated that while his party had never advocated for the introduction of an abortion law, he believed that more should be done to address circumstances that lead to abortion with genuine respect towards human life not only shown during pregnancy but also before and afterwards.

In May 2021, independent MP Marlene Farrugia made the first legislative proposal to decriminalise abortion by replacing the current law with a law punishing only forced abortion with 10 years' imprisonment. The Bill did not proceed into law. Ms Farrugia had announced in 2019 that she would leave Parliament at the next election, and did not stand for re-election in 2022.

The Volt Malta party, founded in the same year, has campaigned for abortion rights since its foundation and especially during the 2022 general election, and is considered Malta's first pro-choice party. However, the party received only 382 votes (0.13%) at the election.

In November 2022, Health Minister Chris Fearne, from the Labour Party, presented the Criminal Code (Amendment No. 3) Bill which stated that no offence shall be committed when the termination of a pregnancy results from "a medical intervention aimed at protecting the health of a pregnant woman suffering from a medical complication which may put her life at risk or her health in grave jeopardy."

A group of 80 physicians, lawyers, ethicists and academics in the Inti Tista' Ssalvani (You can save me) coalition proposed a more limited expert clause, which would have changed the exception for abortion in the Bill to situations where "the death or bodily harm of an unborn child results from a medical intervention conducted with the aim of saving the life of the mother where there is a real and substantial risk of loss of the mother's life from a physical illness."

Around 20,000 people, around 4% of the island's total population, protested outside Parliament against the Bill in December 2022 and were addressed by former President Marie Louise Coleiro Preca. Leader of the Opposition Bernard Grech stated that the government Bill was a means for the Labour Party to introduce abortion in Malta, and insisted that his Nationalist Party would remain opposed to it. Volt Malta criticised the Bill as not going far enough and called for the decriminalisation of abortion as a first step, as well as the legalisation of abortion pills and treatment of abortions as part of medical health care rather than as part of the Criminal Code.

President George Vella indicated his opposition to signing the Bill as originally worded. After several months of consultation, the Labour Government introduced Article 243B to clarify the law, stating that "peace of mind is given that the necessary procedures are in place with the aim of excluding the possibility of any abuse from this important change."

== Statistics ==
Based on comments from doctors with whom he has spoken about the issue, Carmel Cacopardo estimated in 2018 that between 300 and 400 Maltese women travelled abroad to have abortions each year, mostly to Great Britain (about 60 per year) and Italy, but also to Germany, the Netherlands, and Belgium. This estimate indicated that the rate of abortion for women from Malta was between 3.6 and 4.7 per thousand women, compared to the EU average of 4.4.

There are no legal restrictions on women travelling from Malta to other countries or territories to receive an abortion. While abortion has been legal in Italy since 1978, around 80% of medical professionals in Southern Italy and a majority in other Italian regions (as of 2016) objected to providing abortions on grounds of conscience.
