= Conrad Borg Manché =

Maltese politician (born 1980)

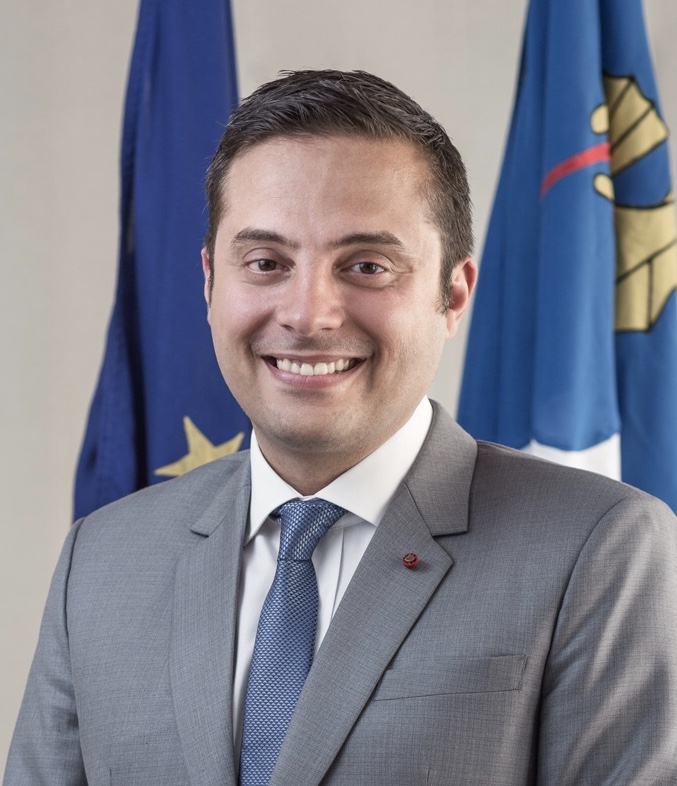

Nationalist Member of parliament
- Incumbent
- Assumed office 4 June 2026

Gzira Local Councillor
- In office 2024–2026

Mayor of Gżira
- In office 2015–2024
- Preceded by: Roberto Cristiano
- Succeeded by: Neville Chetcuti

Personal details
- Born: 1 November 1980 (age 45) St Julian's, Malta
- Party: Nationalist Party (since May 2026); European Conservatives and Reformists Party (2024-2026); Malta Labour Party (2015-2023)
- Children: 2
- Education: University of Malta

Conrad Borg Manché (born 1 November 1980) is a Maltese politician and lawyer who served as the mayor of Gżira from 2015 until 2024 on behalf of the Labour Party. He was raised in Gzira. As a political activist, he gained fame in Malta for re-opening access to the coast of Manoel Island to the public in September, 2016, after it was closed for over 15 years due to the developments by MIDI.

The popular support gained by Borg Manché led to the first environmental guardianship agreement of its kind to be signed in Malta, safeguarding the future of Manoel Island and its surrounding environment of Gżira, Sliema and Valletta.

As a result of his actions the Manoel Island Foundation was founded to serve as the guardian of the Manoel Island Project. The Guardianship agreement ensures unencumbered public access to the Manoel Island foreshore, Fort Manoel, to be utilised for cultural, community and commercial uses enjoyed by the general public, secures protected swimming zones, building heights limited to four floors and a new park of over 80,000 m^{2} will be restored and returned to the public, something hailed as "a model for the relationship between the community and the investor" by Maltese prime minister Joseph Muscat. The Manoel island Foundation is composed by Borg Manché as chairman, and members Claire Bonello, Ralph Mangion and MIDI CEO Mark Portelli.

== Political career ==
Borg Manché was elected as mayor on his first electoral contestation of the 7th legislature of the Gżira Local Council held in 2015. In June 2019, he was re-elected mayor thereby making him the first mayor of Gżira to be re-elected for the second consecutive term and obtaining a record majority of 60%.

Borg Manché is known to be one of the foremost supporters of sustainable development in Malta, protesting against excessive planned skyscraper development in Gżira and ensuring that environmental factors like air quality are monitored properly to safeguard the quality of life for citizens of the locality. Borg Manché resigned from the Labour Party in 2023, citing dissatisfaction with the party's direction and accusing it of betraying its socialist principles.

In April 2024 Borg Manché announced he would contest the European Parliament elections as a right-wing independent. He confirmed that if elected he would join the European Conservatives and Reformists Group. He failed to get elected with 2.3% of the vote, but was the second-best performing independent candidate after Arnold Cassola. He also contested the local council election in Gżira (also as an independent) and was elected to the council. However he lost the mayorship as notwithstanding his defection, the Labour Party managed to retain its majority in the Council. Borg Manché was succeeded as mayor by Neville Chetcuti, who obtained the largest number of votes from all elected candidates.

In the lead-up to the 2026 general election, the Nationalist Party announced that it had approved Borg Manché's nomination to contest a parliamentary mandate in the tenth electoral district, effectively signifying his joining the party.
