= Emmy Bezzina =

Maltese politician

Emanuel "Emmy" Bezzina (born October 29, 1947, to Joseph Bezzina and Joan née Caruana) is the co-founder and chairman of the defunct fringe Maltese political party Alpha Liberal Democratic Party. He is also a broadcaster and has regular weekly TV programmes in which he discusses law and social problems on Smash Television.

Emmy Bezzina contested the first European Parliament elections held in Malta in June 2004, obtaining 717 first-count votes (0.3%).

Emmy Bezzina is also a well known lawyer, best known for being the lawyer of controversial politician Norman Lowell, the leader of the Imperium Europa party.
