= ABBA (political party) =

Political party in Malta

ABBA Partit ABBA
- Leader: Vacant
- Secretary-General: Simon Elmer
- Treasurer: Romina Magro
- Founded: 22 October 2021
- Preceded by: Alleanza Bidla
- Youth wing: ABBA Youths
- Trade union wing: ABBA Workers Union (AWU); ABBA Retail Trade Union (ARTU)
- Ideology: Maltese nationalism; Conservatism
- Political position: Right-wing
- European affiliation: European Christian Political Party
- Colours: White; Red; Purple
- Slogan: "Dinjità lil Malta" ("Dignity to Malta")
- Parliament of Malta: 0 / 67
- European Parliament: 0 / 6
- Local Council Seats: 0 / 462

Website
- abba.mt

ABBA (Maltese: Partit ABBA) is an inactive conservative political party in Malta. Founded in 2021, it was described as a right-wing party.

== History ==
The party was founded in 2021 by Ivan Grech Mintoff, the former leader of Alleanza Bidla. The party's registrations was initially refused by the Electoral Commission due to the party's name not being able to be shortened to an acronym. In response to this ABBA filed a judicial protest arguing the commission was discriminating against them. The Electoral Commission later agreed to register the party. ABBA took part in the 2022 general elections with candidates in all 13 districts, they received 0.42% of votes. Most ABBA candidates who ran in the election are also members of the Charismatic Pentecostal group River of Love.

Grech Mintoff resigned as party leader and from ABBA itself just before the 2024 European Parliament elections, following a dispute with Secretary-General Simon Elmer. Grech Mintoff was still on the ballot as an ABBA candidate due to the papers being printed, but asked to be considered an independent candidate.

The party's social media accounts went inactive after June 2024. Elmer and party treasurer Romina Magro later joined Edwin Vassallo's National Democratic Union, after the movement's founding in 2025.

The party was a member of the European Christian Political Movement (now the European Christian Political Party), but was no longer listed on its website as of 2025.

== Ideology ==
ABBA was against COVID restrictions, forming two trade unions in an attempt to combat them. The party wishes for a national referendum to take place on the Recreational Use of Cannabis, stating the laws introduced that partially legalised recreational cannabis in Malta were opposed by many Maltese citizens.

The party describes itself as pro-life, with founder Ivan Mintoff stating the Labour and Nationalist parties are "proposing a culture of death" and wish to legalise abortion. The party has filed a police complaint demanding the criminal investigation of 18 Maltese abortion liberalisation activists and organisations. Certain members of the party espoused various beliefs such as vaccine scepticism, being in favour of freedom to refuse vaccines.

== Election results ==
=== House of Representatives ===
Election	Leader	Votes	%	Seats	+/−	Rank	Status
2022	Ivan Grech Mintoff	1,364	0.46	0 / 79	New	5th	Extra-parliamentary

=== European Parliament ===
Election	Leader	Votes	%	Seats	+/−	Rank	EP Group
2024	Ivan Grech Mintoff	527	0.20	0 / 6	New	5th	–
