= Thomas Bajada =

Maltese politician (born 1994)

MEP Thomas Bajada
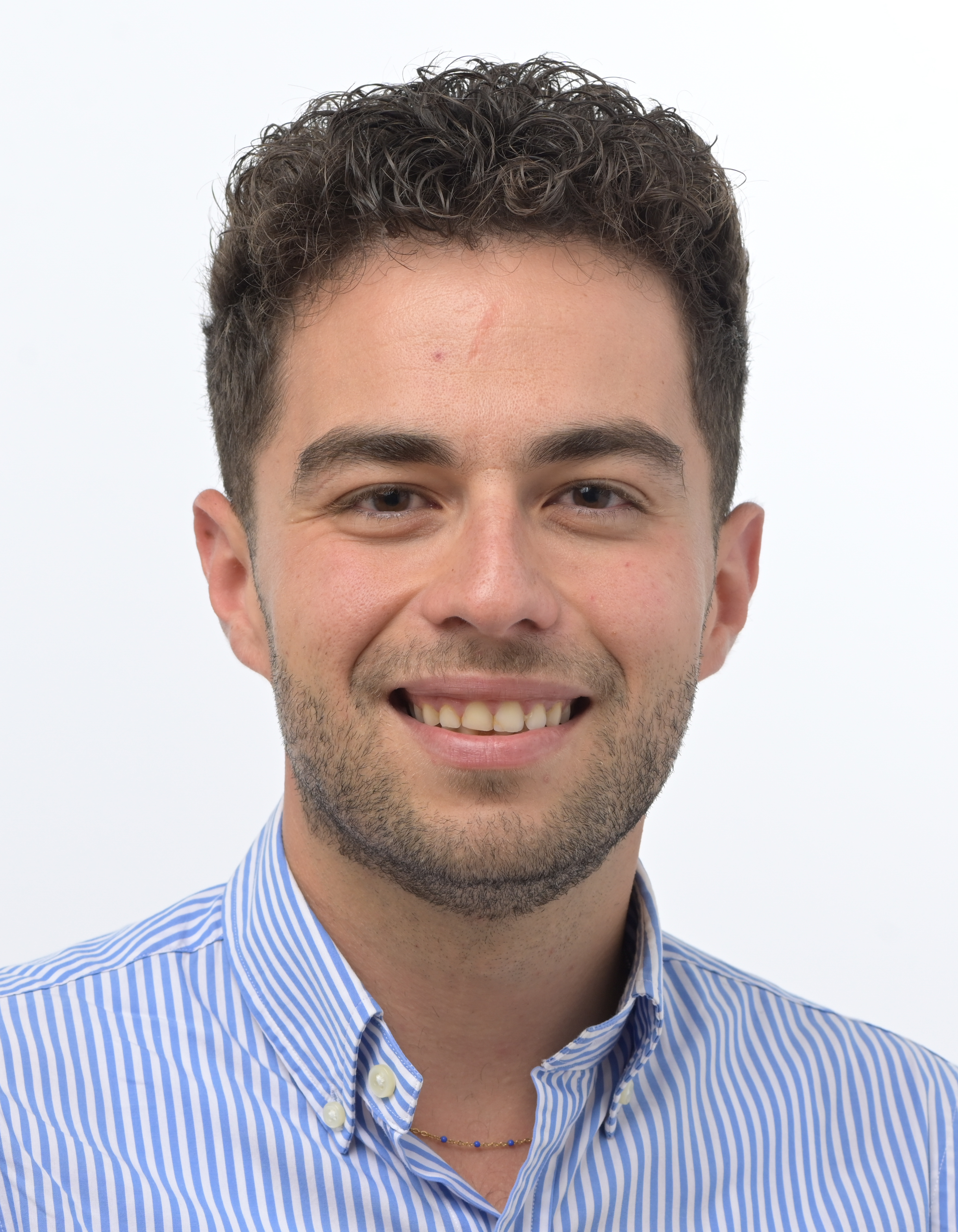

Member of the European Parliament for Malta
- Incumbent
- Assumed office 8 June 2024

Personal details
- Born: 13 June 1994 (age 32) Victoria, Malta
- Party: National; Labour Party; European; Socialists & Democrats
- Education: University of Malta

Thomas Bajada (born 13 June 1994) is a Maltese politician, Member of the European Parliament since 2024 for the Labour Party (S&D)

== Early life and education ==
Bajada was born on 13 June 1994 in Victoria, Gozo. He obtained a Bachelor of Science (Honours) in Biology and Chemistry in 2016 and a Master of Arts in Ocean governance in 2017, both from the University of Malta.

During university years, Bajada was active in the Labour-affiliated student organisation Pulse, and served between 2013 and 2016 as secretary-general of the Maltese National Youth Council.

== Early career ==
Bajada also held positions in Gozitan cultural organisations, as Secretary General of the Soċjetà Filarmonika Leone A.D. 1863 and of Teatru tal-Opra Aurora in Victoria between 2017 and 2022.

From June 2017 to December 2019, Bajada worked for the Maltese Government at the Parliamentary Secretariat for Agriculture, Fisheries and Animal Rights. From December 2019 to June 2024, he worked in Brussels as technical attaché for fisheries at Malta's Permanent Representation to the European Union, representing Malta in EU Council working groups.

== Member of the European Parliament ==
In February 2024, prime minister and Labour Party leader Robert Abela offered Bajada a post on the PL election list for the European Parliament, which he accepted. The PL was interested in having a Gozitan candidate on its list, following the decision of incumbent MEP Josianne Cutajar not to run.

Bajada received 10,792 first-preference votes and was elected as the third Labour Party candidate to secure a seat in the 2024 European Parliament election in Malta. He was also the only Gozitan candidate on the Labour Party's list to be elected. During the 10th parliamentary term, he became a member of the Committee on Fisheries (PECH) and the Committee on the Environment, Climate and Food Safety (ENVI).

In December 2024, Bajada was appointed rapporteur for the European Parliament's own-initiative report on the European Water Resilience Strategy. The report addressed the management and protection of water resources, including water efficiency, pollution, infrastructure investment and adaptation to climate change. The European Parliament adopted its recommendations on 7 May 2025. The report was adopted with 470 votes in favour, 81 against and 92 abstentions. In October 2025, Bajada received the Water-Smart MEP of the Year 2025 award from Water Europe, in recognition of his work on the European Water Resilience Strategy.

In April 2025, Bajada served as rapporteur for a report concerning amendments to the regulation on measures for the conservation of fish stocks in relation to countries allowing non-sustainable fishing. The report was adopted by the European Parliament.

In June 2025, Bajada received the Best Newcomer award within the S&D group at the annual MEP Awards organised by the Brussels-based publication The Parliament. The award recognised his work during his first year as a Member of the European Parliament, including his role in the European Water Resilience Strategy.

In March 2026, Bajada presented a further report concerning amendments to the regulations implementing conservation and control measures adopted by regional fisheries management organisations, including the International Commission for the Conservation of Atlantic Tunas and other international fisheries bodies.
