= Josette Demicoli =

Maltese judge

Josette Demicoli (1967–70) is a Maltese judge. She was appointed magistrate in 2011, and judge in 2022.

== See also ==
- Judiciary of Malta
