= Malta Union of Bank Employees =

MUBE - Malta Union of Bank Employees
- Malta Union of Bank Employees
- Founded: 1972
- Headquarters: Valletta, Malta
- Location: Malta
- Members: approximately 3,000
- Key people: President - Mr. William Portelli, General Secretary - Dr. Adrian Borg
- Affiliations: CMTU, UNI Global Union, SCECBU (Standing Committee of European Central Banks Unions)
- Website: http://www.mube.org/

Malta Union of Bank Employees (MUBE), formerly known as Malta Union of Bankers and Movement of United Bank Employees, is one of the largest professional unions in Malta with a high membership penetration in the clerical, signatory and managerial grades. The Union enjoys full recognition by the largest banking institutions in Malta.

== History ==
The MUBE was formed by a group of employees at the National Bank of Malta, which is currently known as Bank of Valletta plc. The founding employees were members of the General Workers' Union (Malta) but recognised the need of a union which specifically defended the rights of bank employees. The Union was subsequently registered on 22 May 1972 at the Office of the Registrar of Trade Unions and membership was restricted solely to bank employees - the first and only Bankers' Union to date in Malta.

During the years MUBE expanded to include members employed in various companies within banking and insurance. Today approximately 3,000 banking and insurance workers in Malta recognise the importance of union representation and are registered members in MUBE. MUBE played a key role through its public support to Malta’s membership with the European Union and is also one of the leading affiliates of the Confederation of Malta Trade Unions (CMTU), and internationally affiliated to UNI Global Union.
