= Volt Malta =

Political party in Malta

- Abbreviation: Volt
- Co-presidents: Arnas Lasys; Alexia DeBono
- Founded: 2020
- Registered: 30 April 2021
- Headquarters: Balzan
- Ideology: Progressivism; European federalism; Social liberalism; Pro-Europeanism
- Political position: Centre to centre-left
- European political alliance: Volt Europa
- Colours: Purple
- Parliament of Malta: 0 / 67
- European Parliament: 0 / 6
- Local Council Seats: 0 / 462

Website
- voltmalta.org

National sections of Volt Europa. The borders of the European Union are shown in red.

Volt Malta is a political party in Malta and the Maltese branch of Volt Europa, a Eurofederalist and progressive European political alliance, which advocates for greater European cooperation across Europe.

== History ==
=== Foundation ===
Volt Malta was founded in 2020, although it was registered as a party on 30 April 2021. This makes it the 16th national representative of Volt Europa registered as a party.

The political participated in its first General Election in 2022.

== Policies ==
As part of the European network, Volt Malta follows a pan-European approach to many policy areas such as climate change, migration, economic inequality, international conflict and the impact of the technological revolution on the labour market.

In addition, the party has set out to address a wide range of issues in Malta, such as corruption through the promotion of transparent governance and separation of powers, or environmental and climate protection, through an emphasis on a circular economy.

=== Immigration and asylum policy ===
Volt advocates for a European asylum systems and a humanitarian approach to refugees and economic migrants. Language courses and courses on European cultural and civic norms are to be promoted for refugees and asylum seekers.

=== Health & Social Policy ===
Volt is committed to sexual & reproductive rights and calls for the decriminalization of abortion and the classification of all contraceptives as essential medicine, making it the first pro-choice party in Malta. The group also emphasizes this with #IneedMAP!, an initiative to improve access to the Morning After Pill (MAP), pharmacies were mapped that sell the MAP. In vitro fertilisation should be legal and carried out with genetic tests to rule out diseases in advance. In October 2021, Co-President Alexia DeBono criticised even Netflix's show Sex Education for providing better sex education than the current curriculum and called for a fact-based curriculum and sex education free of doctrine that empowers young people to make informed choices and discover themselves in an open, stigma-free environment. Sex education should be guaranteed at state, private and church schools, regardless of the type of school. Period poverty is something the party wants to fight and advocates for free menstrual products in educational institutions, public health facilities and hospitals, food banks, prisons, homeless shelters and public toilets and menstrual products to be covered under the 0% VAT regime.

Health workers are to receive a salary supplement for work done during the pandemic.

Volt advocates for the legalisation of cannabis and called for a more progressive reform than before. The party proposes a limit of 25 grams for personal possession and use. Addiction should be treated as a medical problem, not a criminal one. To this end, instead of a cannabis authority as planned so far, an authority for recreational drugs should be established to enable studies and guidelines for different drugs and to better combat the black market. The party brought its proposals on this to the White Paper process to develop guidelines for dealing with drugs in Malta.

The minimum wage in Malta is to be increased to €1,100 by 2025, based on the European Commission's recommendations of 60% of the median wage in a country. To ensure the right to a living minimum wage, a Living Wage Unit is to be established within the National Statistics Office, responsible for the regular calculation of the living wage.

Parents should be entitled to 20 weeks of fully paid parental leave, regardless of their gender, sexual orientation and whether they choose adoption or surrogacy. In doing so, the party aims to advance gender equality and combat discrimination by employers. The party supports making femicide a separate criminal offence and including it in the Criminal Code.

The party wants sex work to be regulated. Volt proposes to impose prison sentences on illegal brothel operators and human traffickers and to create support services for people who are forced into prostitution. Sex workers should also be allowed to register and brothels should only be organised as cooperatives to prevent procuring. Sex workers should be over 21, clients must be at least 18 to be eligible for appropriate services, and unprotected sex should be banned, as well as regular STD testing becoming mandatory.

Volt distinguishes between three forms of euthanasia: passive euthanasia, assisted suicide and active euthanasia, the latter whereby the party rejects the last and proposes accompanying measures and counselling services.

=== Transparency and governance ===
Volt Malta supports the European citizens' initiative "Voters Without Borders", which calls for voting rights at local and national level for EU citizens as well. If the initiative is successful, it could give them access to foreign voters who currently cannot vote in general elections and do not identify with the Nationalist Party or the Labour Party.

As part of the party's efforts for more transparency in party finances, the group launched a campaign, #PolitikaOnesta, which provides users with a breakdown of party advertising spending over periods ranging from one day to 90 days. The party demands that all finances of a political party should be governed exclusively by the party financing law and not by a mixture of party financing law and corporate law.

Volt demands that the ONE and NET television channels, owned by the Partit Laburista and Partit Nazzjonalista parties, should no longer be regulated under company law, as they can be used to circumvent party funding rules and disguise donations. The party also criticises the broadcasters for receiving financial support during the Covid-19 pandemic, thus providing state funding to the parties behind them with taxpayers' money, which is not otherwise common in Malta.

A fixed term of office should be introduced for the parliament.

A non-governmental body is to conduct an audit and performance review of the entire public sector and publish the results. As a follow-up, a government digital dashboard of expenditure is to be developed.

=== Digitalisation ===
The party supports the promotion of digital infrastructure. Legislation should be adapted to allow ethical hacking, also known as white hat hacking, and calls for companies with a digital presence to introduce bounty programmes.

=== Economic policy ===
To promote small and medium-sized enterprises (SMEs) and startups, Volt supports an orientation toward the New Zealand model with incentives for reinvestment of profits, creation of new jobs, and greater support for digital infrastructure. By promoting an accredited network of venture capital firms and angel investors, it aims to increase the amount of venture capital and make it more transparent. The aim is to make it easier for companies to start up and grow. The establishment of companies is also to be supported by setting up business incubators. Cooperative law is to be modernised to make the economy more crisis-proof.

Tourism is to be geared more towards quality and move away from a focus on short-term visitors. To this end, the party wants to open up North America as a new market and attract people of Maltese descent as a target group. This, along with a diaspora passport, is intended to attract foreign direct investment to Malta.

The party proposes the promotion of vertical agriculture, agricultural technology and robotics industry to diversify the economy and the research sector for sustainable economic growth. The economy on Gozo is to be made more independent, especially through the promotion of agricultural technology. To this end, the Party proposes the establishment of an Agritech Start-up Centre in Gozo.

High-priority economic sectors are to be promoted through targeted increases in scholarships. The party also proposes a bonus programme for completing financial literacy courses.

=== Environmental and climate protection ===
Volt opposes EU funding for a gas pipeline to transport liquefied natural gas (LNG) to Malta and favors a focus on green hydrogen and other renewable gases. A feasibility study will be conducted to explore the use of hydrogen in Malta, but the overall focus will be on renewable energy.

The transport sector is to be redesigned to reduce emissions. To this end, pedestrian zones are to be promoted and town centres are to be made more pedestrian-friendly and barrier-free. Cycling is to be supported by structurally separated cycle paths, concepts for bicycle sharing and the expansion of bicycle parking spaces. In addition, public transport should be promoted by setting up a 24/7 bus system and expanding night bus services. A one-ticket system is intended to promote the switch to public transport.

Urban and communal agriculture and horticulture should be promoted to reduce emissions.

=== European policy ===
Volt strives for a federal European state instead of a supranational system of the EU. To this end, a European constitution is to be adopted. The common European government would then be responsible for fields such as defence and foreign relations, the regional governments for social affairs and education.

== Elections ==
=== 2022 General Election ===
The party contested the 2022 general election.Thomas 'Kass' Mallia was the first transgender woman to contest Malta's general elections and stood for the party in Districts 10 and 11. She was joined by the party's Co-President Alexia DeBono who is ran on Districts 8 and 9. Therefore the party ran on 4 of the country's 13 districts with 2 candidates In the run-up to the election, the party called for Malta to allow citizens living abroad to vote through an embassy, consulate or by post.

On 1 March 2022, the party published its 54-page election manifesto, which placed an emphasis on the expansion and protection of legally enshrined human rights, particularly in the areas of social and financial affairs, education, health, transport and migration. Volt contested under the slogan "Ivvota Aħjar. Ivvota Volt" (Vote Better. Vote Volt).

In the run-up to the election, as part of the campaign #PolitikaOnesta (Honest Politics), Volt asked all candidates to sign a declaration not to give out favours for votes in the election. In addition to Volt's candidates, the candidates of the ADPD and independent candidate Arnold Cassola signed the declaration, but only 5 of the two major parties, Partit Laburista and Partit Nazzjonalista.

The party spent €61.40 on marketing during its election campaign. Additionally, DeBono and Mallia spent €279 and €180 respectively in their personal campaigns, which included a €180 registration fee per candidate.

=== 2024 European elections ===
On 1 February 2024, Volt announced its Vice-President Matthias Iannis Portelli as its first candidate for the European elections. The party is running for the European elections together with the rest of the Volt Europa movement with a joint programme that was adopted in Paris in November 2023

== Election results ==
=== House of Representatives ===
Election	Leaders	Votes	%	Seats	+/−	Rank	Status
2022	Arnas Lasys; Alexia DeBono	382	0.13	0 / 79	New	6th	Extra-parliamentary
2026	Arnas Lasys; Alexia DeBono	Did not participate					

=== European Parliament ===
Election	Leader	Votes	%	Seats	+/−	Rank	EP Group
2024	Arnas Lasys; Alexia DeBono	298	0.11	0 / 6	New	6th	–
