= List of political parties in Malta =

This article lists political parties in Malta. Since World War II, Maltese political culture has developed into a two-party system dominated by the centre-left Labour Party (Maltese: Partit Laburista) and the centre-right Nationalist Party (Maltese: Partit Nazzjonalista). Although other political parties have presented candidates and, in some cases, elected MPs, in most cases these were splinter groups of the main parties and, on the rare occasions when they were successful, this success was short-lived.

In the case of Local Councils however, independent candidates and village-dedicated parties have better chances of being elected. Għarb l-Ewwel (en: Għarb First), Floriana l-Ewwel (mt: Floriana First) and AD+PD hold representation in a Local Council.

Until 2015, there was no law in Malta requiring the registration and regulation of political parties; the General Elections Act made the necessary provisions for party participation in elections but no official list was maintained between elections. The Financing of Political Parties Act, which passed in 2015 and came into effect on 1 January 2016, introduced the requirement for political parties to register themselves with the Electoral Commission and declare all donations in order to be able to field candidates in general elections and European Parliament elections. The Labour Party was the first party to attempt to register, on 3 June 2016, however its statute was found to be non-compliant, therefore making Moviment Patrijotti Maltin the first party to be officially registered, on 24 November 2016.

== Registered Parties ==
=== National parties represented in the Maltese Parliament and the European Parliament ===
| Party | Est. | Ideology | Political position | Leader | House | MEPs | Local Councillors | EU party | EP group |
in Government
| Labour Party (PL); Partit Laburista | 1920 | Social democracy | Centre-left | Robert Abela | 42 / 67 | 3 / 6 | 252 / 462 | PES | S&D |
| Independents (Note: Rosianne Cutajar until 9 August 2024 and Clayton Bartolo) | | Various or N/A | | | 1 / 79 | N/A | | | |
in Opposition
| Nationalist Party (PN); Partit Nazzjonalista | 1926 | Christian democracy | Centre-right | Alex Borg | 37 / 67 | 3 / 6 | 208 / 462 | EPP | EPP |

=== Parties represented in Local Councils ===
| Name | Est. | Ideology | Political position | Leader | Local Councillors | European party |
|---|---|---|---|---|---|---|
| AD+PD | 2020 | Green politics | Centre-left | Sandra Gauci | 2 / 462 | EGP |
| Għarb First (GĦ1); Għarb l-Ewwel | 2019 | Għarb localism; Parish-Council collaboration | —N/a | David Apap | Għarb Local Council: 2 / 5 | —N/a |
| Floriana First (FL); Floriana l-Ewwel | 2019 | Floriana localism | —N/a | Nigel Holland | Floriana Local Council: 1 / 5 | —N/a |
| Imperium Europa (IE) | 2000 | Ultranationalism | Far-right | Eman Alexander Cross | 1 / 462 | —N/a |
| Independents | N/A | Various or N/A | | | 6 / 462 | Various or N/A |

=== Unrepresented national parties ===
| Name | Founded | Ideology | Position | Leader | European party |
|---|---|---|---|---|---|
| Momentum | 2025 | Centrism; Anti-corruption | Centre to centre-left | Arnold Cassola | EDP |
| Volt Malta (VM) | 2021 | Social liberalism; Pro-Europeanism | Centre-left | Alexia DeBono; Arnas Lasys | Volt Europa |

=== Unrepresented local parties ===
| Name | Founded | Village/Town | Leader |
|---|---|---|---|
| Residents of Valletta (RB); Residenti Beltin | 2021 | Valletta | Billy McBee |

=== Inactive, registered political parties ===
| Name | Ideology | Position | Leader | European party |
|---|---|---|---|---|
| ABBA | Christian right | Far-right | —N/a | ECPM |
| Alliance for Change (AB); Alleanza Bidla (Note: Alleanza Bidla has been de-facto succeeded by another party, ABBA, also initially led by Grech Mintoff.) | Social conservatism | Right-wing | Ivan Grech Mintoff | ECPM |
| Maltese Patriots Movement (MPM); Moviment Patrijotti Maltin | Euroscepticism; Anti-Islam | Far-right | Henry Battistino | —N/a |
| Brain, not ego (BNE) | Catch all party | Big-tent | Antoine Borg | —N/a |

== Defunct and/or deregistered parties ==
- Alleanza Nazzjonali Repubblikana
- Alliance of Liberal Democrats Malta
- Alpha Liberal Democratic Party
- Aħwa Maltin
- Anti-Reform Party
- Christian Workers' Party (active during 1960's Church/PL conflict)
- Constitutional Party
- Democratic Alternative
- Democratic Action Party
- Democratic Nationalist Party (1921–26)
- Democratic Nationalist Party (1959–66)
- Democratic Party (1987)
- Democratic Party (2016–20)
- Eagle Party (Partit tal-Ajkla)
- Gozo Party
- Jones Party
- Independent Labour Party
- Integrity Party
- Libertas Malta
- Malta Workers Party
- Maltese Political Union
- National Action
- Communist Party of Malta
- Progressive Constitutionalist Party

== See also ==
- Politics of Malta
- List of political parties by country
