= Claudette Abela Baldacchino =

Maltese politician

Claudette Abela Baldacchino MEP
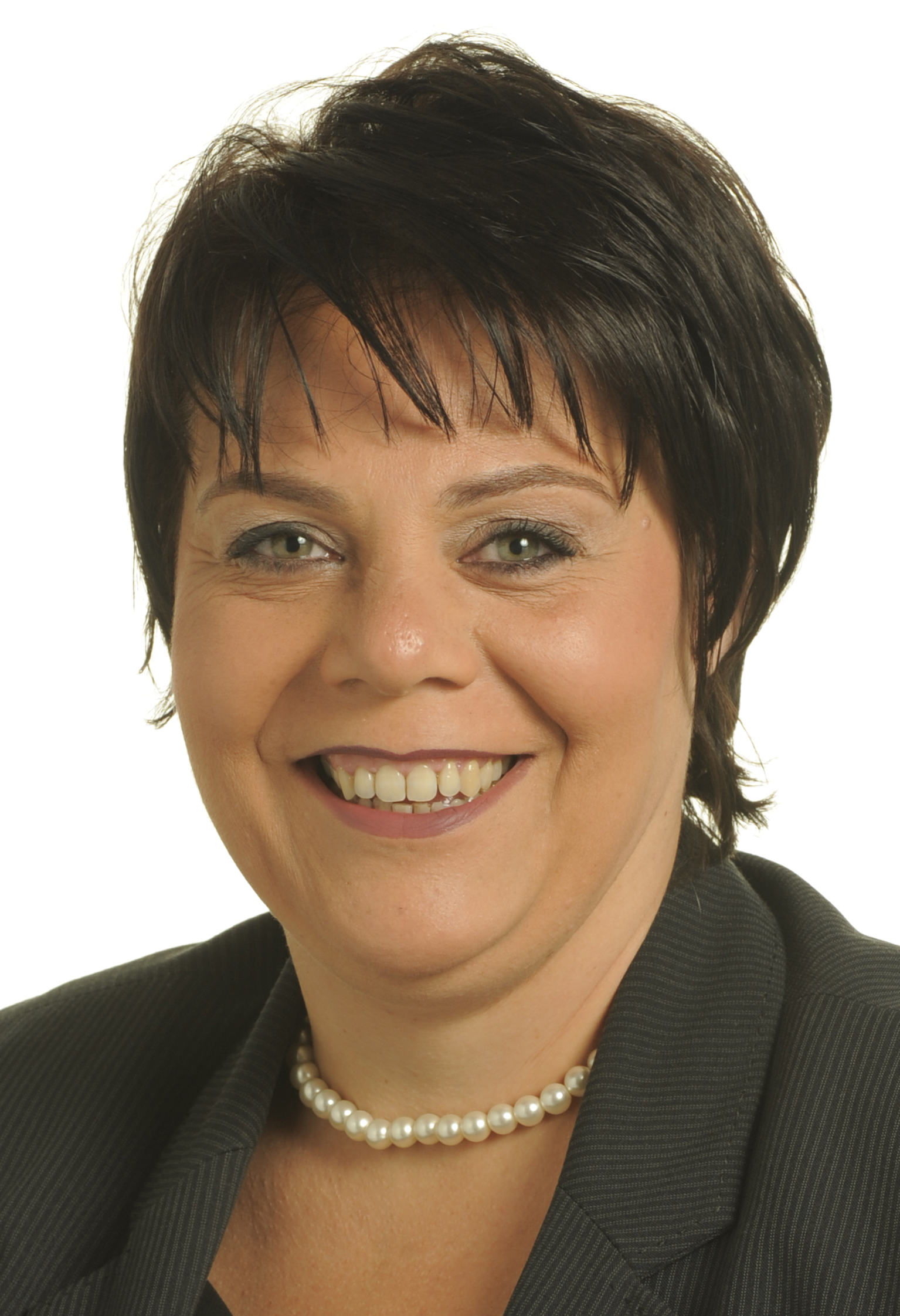
- Claudette Abela Baldacchino in 2019

Member of the European Parliament for Malta
- In office 2 July 2019 – July 2024

Personal details
- Born: 17 February 1973 (age 53)
- Party: Labour Party

Claudette Abela Baldacchino (born February 17, 1973) is a Maltese politician and journalist who has served as a Member of the European Parliament from 2013 to 2014. In Malta, she represents the Labour Party, where she was president of the Women's Group known as Nisa Laburisti from 2014 until 2018.

== Biography ==
Born on 17 February 1973, Claudette Abela Baldacchino was brought up in the village of Qrendi in southwestern Malta. In addition to a degree in social studies (1999), she is also a graduate in social administration (2005). From 1995, she worked as a journalist and new presenter for Maltese radio and television. In the 2000s, she served as reporter in the Maltese Community of the Regions, taking a special interest in Social Europe and stressing that the most important issue for her was people rather than money.

From 2005, she was a member of the Council of Europe's Congress of Local and Regional Authorities. In 2009, she was elected a Member of the European Parliament where she joined the Committee on Internal Market and Consumer Protection and the Delegation for relations with Australia and New Zealand.

In 2013, Abela Baldacchino was prominent in the press as a result of her standing for the European Parliament elections while facing criminal charges of fraud in connection with travel payments she had claimed. She was subsequently cleared on this on 15 September 2021, in a lengthy court case presided by magistrate Josette Demicoli.

On 5 February 2024, Abela Baldacchino announced that she would be running for a seat on behalf of Malta's Labour Party in the European Parliament elections taking place in June.
