= Alleanza Bidla =

Alliance for Change Alleanza Bidla
- Abbreviation: AB
- Founded: c. 2013
- Succeeded by: ABBA (de facto)
- Ideology: Social conservatism; Christian democracy
- Political position: Right-wing
- European affiliation: European Christian Political Party
- House of Representatives: 0 / 67
- European Parliament: 0 / 6
- Local Council Seats: 0 / 462

Website
- alleanzabidla.com

The Alliance for Change (Maltese: Alleanza Bidla, AB) is a defunct right-wing Christian-democratic political party in Malta. It is eurosceptic and has expressed socially conservative stances. It was led by Ivan Grech Mintoff, who in 2021 founded ABBA Party. Although the party's social media has not been updated since 2019, as of 2022 Alleanza Bidla remains a registered political party.

== 2017 parliamentary election ==
After going through the judicial system, Alleanza Bidla were able to nominate a total of four candidates to contest on two electoral districts each.

The names of the candidates (along with the electoral districts that they contested on) were:

- Ivan Grech Mintoff (1st and 12th district)
- Elizabeth (k/a Claire) Mikkelsen (9th and 10th district)
- Joseph Giardina (7th and 12th district)
- Saviour (Sonny) Xeureb (6th and 11th district)

== Election results ==
=== House of Representatives ===
Election	Leader	Votes	%	Seats	+/–	Position	Government
2017	Ivan Grech Mintoff	221	0.07	0 / 67	New	6th	Extra-parliamentary

=== European Parliament ===
Election	Leader	Votes	%	Seats	+/–	Position	EP Group
2014	Ivan Grech Mintoff	1,015	0.40	0 / 6	New	6th	–
2019	Ivan Grech Mintoff	1,186	0.46	0 / 6	0	6th	–
