= Maltese =

Maltese may refer to:

- Someone or something of, from, or related to Malta
- Maltese alphabet
- Maltese cuisine
- Maltese culture
- Maltese language, the Semitic language spoken by Maltese people
- Maltese people, people from Malta or of Maltese descent

== Animals ==
- Maltese dog
- Maltese cat
- Maltese goat
- Maltese pigeon
- Maltese tiger

== Other uses ==
- Maltese cross
- Maltese (surname), a surname (including a list of people with the name)

== See also ==
- The Maltese Falcon (disambiguation)
