= David Casa =

Maltese politician and Member of the European Parliament

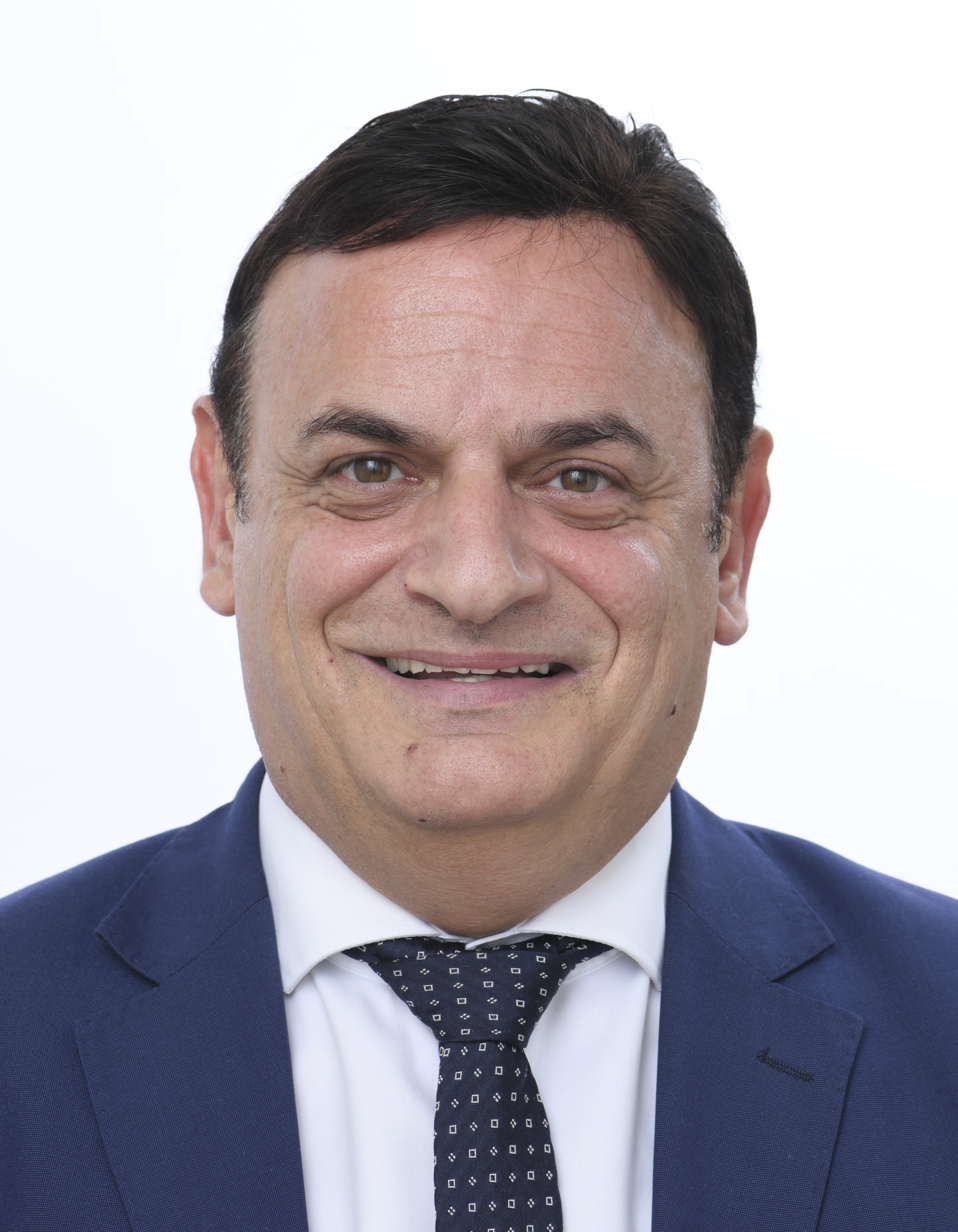

MEP for Malta
- Incumbent
- Assumed office 20 July 2004

Personal details
- Born: 16 November 1968 (age 58) Pietà, Malta
- Party: Partit Nazzjonalista
- Other political affiliations: European's People Party
- Website: www.davidcasa.eu

David Casa (born 16 November 1968) is a Maltese politician and Member of the European Parliament. As a member of the Nationalist Party in Malta, he belongs to the European People's Party. First eleected in June 2004, he is Malta's longest serving MEP.

Casa has previously worked in Malta's public administration and campaigned for Malta's EU accession as secretary-general of Moviment Iva (Yes Movement).

During his parliamentary career, Casa has focused particularly on employment and social affairs. He has participated in negotiations on several European Union legislative initiatives, including the Work–Life Balance Directive, the European Social Fund Plus and the Social Climate Fund. He also served as a Quaestor in the Bureau of the European Parliament and was involved in the establishment of the Daphne Caruana Galizia Prize for Journalism.

== Early life and career ==
Born at St. Luke's Hospital in Pietà, David Casa is the son of Anthony (Twanny) Casa and Rita née Degabriele (daughter of Gaetano and Maggie née Bondin). He grew up in Valletta, in a house overlooking the Grand Harbour. By 2020, he was resident in Gżira, although his usual domicile since 2004 has been Brussels.

There is no available information about David Casa's studies. He is likely to have started working early on, in Malta's banking sector. From 1987, at age 19, he joined the executive committee of the Union of Bankers (later the Malta Union of Bank Employees, MUBE).

Casa served as a personal assistant to the Deputy Prime Minister and Minister for Foreign Affairs Guido de Marco between 1990 and 1994 and then worked at Malta's High Commission in London as deputy of Victor Camilleri from 1995 to 1996.

Casa again served in the cabinet of foreign minister Guido de Marco between 1998 and 1999 In 1998 Casa became a member of the Council of the Confederation of Malta Trade Unions (CMTU)

After De Marco was elected President of Malta in 1999, from 2001 to 2003 Casa moved to the post of Inter-Ministerial Coordinator for EU Matters at the Ministry of Foreign Affairs.

Casa then served as executive secretary of the Malta-EU Steering and Action Committee (MEUSAC) between 2003 and 2004.

Casa was also a founding member of Moviment Iva, the Yes Movement, which campaigned in favour of Malta's membership of the European Union from 2000 until the 2003 Maltese European Union membership referendum. Casa also led radio programmes on Radio 101 to inform the public about the EU.

== European Parliament ==
=== First two terms (2004–2014) ===
Casa was first elected to the European Parliament in 2004, following Malta's accession to the European Union. He was re-elected in 2009 and served during the sixth and seventh parliamentary terms.

During this period, he represented the Nationalist Party within the European People's Party group. His parliamentary work included participation in committees and initiatives concerning European policy and institutional affairs.

=== Third term (2014–2019) ===
Following his re-election in 2014, Casa became increasingly involved in the EP work on employment and social policy. He served as a member of the Committee on Employment and Social Affairs (EMPL) and held responsibilities within the EPP Group's coordination of the committee. He was the Coordinator for the EMPL Committee for two terms during the 8th legislature, having been reelected unanimously in 2017.

One of his principal legislative responsibilities during this period was the negotiation on behalf of the EPP Group of the Work–Life Balance Directive, which established paternal leave as an EU right. He was the first Maltese MEP to negotiate a directive.

David Casa was also a member of the Parliament's PANA committee (2016–2017), established following the Panama Papers revelations to examine alleged breaches and maladministration in the implementation of EU law concerning money laundering, tax avoidance and tax evasion. He continued the work in the following years in the TAX3 committee (2018–2019), examining financial crimes and tax practices.

=== Fourth term (2019–2024) ===
Casa was re-elected in 2019. During the ninth parliamentary term, he continued his work on employment and social affairs and undertook additional institutional responsibilities.

He served as a Quaestor of the European Parliament, responsible for administrative and financial matters affecting MEPs, and was a member of the Bureau of the European Parliament.

In 2020, Casa was appointed co-chair of the EP Media Working Group, alongside Renew MEP Ramona Strugariu.

In 2021, David Casa presided over the first edition of the Daphne Caruana Galizia Prize for Journalism, for which he was responsible as EP Quaestor and as co-chair of the Media Working Group. The first edition was won by Forbidden Stories for the Pegasus Project.

In 2021, Casa concluded negotiations on the European Social Fund Plus, worth €88 billion in the 2021-2027 period.

In 2023, together with Dutch MEP Esther de Lange, Casa finalised negotiations on the Social Climate Fund, aimed to ensure social justice in the EU's Fit-for-55 climate package under the European Green Deal. Casa was described by Politico Europe in 2022 as a key MEP for his work as co-rapporteur on the Social Climate Fund.

In 2024, as the EPP's negotiator on the EU Disability Card and the EU Parking Card, Casa helped reach a deal to bolster access to mobility rights across the EU.

=== Fifth term (2024–2029) ===
Casa was re-elected in 2024, securing a fifth parliamentary term.

During the 2024–2029 parliamentary term, he serves on the Committee on Employment and Social Affairs (EMPL), the Special Committee on the Housing Crisis in the EU and the Delegation for relations with the Arab Peninsula.

== Recognition ==
- Croce dell'Ordine - Sovereign Military Order of Malta (SMOM)
