= Imperium Europa =

- Leader: Eman Cross
- President: Norman Lowell
- Founder: Norman Lowell
- Founded: 2000
- Registered: 2019
- Youth wing: Malta Right-Wing Youths (2019-2021)
- Ideology: Pan-European nationalism; White supremacy; Esoteric neo-Nazism (denied); Ultranationalism; Antisemitism; Islamophobia; Right-libertarianism (self-described)
- Political position: Far-right
- Religion: Primarily Cosmotheism with elements of modern paganism, esoterism and mysticism
- Colours: Gold; Red; Black
- Slogan: Magna Europa est Patria Nostra
- Anthem: Ave Europa
- Parliament of Malta: 0 / 67
- European Parliament: 0 / 6
- Local Council Seats: 0 / 462

Party flag

Imperium Europa, also called simply Imperium, is a minor ultranationalist political party in Malta. It was founded on 9 February 2000 by Norman Lowell, who was also its leader. Its primary aim is to unite Europe into one political entity, a "Europe of regions and peoples, stretching from the Channel, to Vladivostok", in order to "save the white race".

== History ==
It was officially founded on 9 February 2000, by Norman Lowell. Initially, the party started with eight members, including Norman Lowell and Arlette Baldacchino. But later on, five out of eight of the founding members were expelled due to being sleeper agents for the Nationalist, and the Labour Parties respectively. Imperium Europa contested its first election back in 2004, obtaining 1,603 votes (0.63%). On 22 January 2005, Imperium Europa made its first and one of, if not, the most notable public event associated with the party, taking place in Safi, Malta. The event was when most of the public started taking notice of Imperium Europa. The speech consisted of Norman Lowell making a speech regarding how illegal immigration will irreversibly damage the country, as happened with other European and Western countries. With Norman Lowell quoting that "our children shall open their eyes one day.. being strangers in their own lands!". In the 2009 European Parliament election in Malta, its candidates were Norman Lowell and Reuben Cauchi. In the next election, Imperium Europa contested with three candidates, who were: Norman Lowell, Antoine Galea and Arlette Baldacchino. It was registered as a political party in 2019. In the 2019 Maltese MEP elections, Imperium Europa got its record number of votes, totalling 8,238 1st preference votes (3.17%). Lowell was the only candidate representing Imperium Europa in this election. In 2024, Imperium Europa contested in Malta with Norman Lowell and Terrence Portelli on the ballot, shrinking its votes compared to the previous elections for the first time; this time obtaining 6,816 votes (2.62%), 1,422 votes less than the election before.

=== Norman Lowell era (2000-2025) ===
Norman Lowell was the party's founder and leader, having led the party continuously since its inception on 9 February 2000. He was the sole candidate in the first European Parliament elections that were held in Malta on 12 June 2004. He obtained 1,603 first-count votes from a total of 250,691 votes cast (0.64%). In the 2009 European Parliament elections, Lowell obtained 3,359 first-count votes (a 122% increase over the 2009 MEP elections). Mr. Lowell ran again in 2014 and got 7,000 votes, more than double the 2009 MEP result. In 2019, he received his best electoral result of 8,238 votes, as the only candidate representing Imperium Europa in the election. In the 2024 Maltese MEP elections he only obtained 6,669 votes, with the other 147 votes for Imperium Europa going to Terrence Portelli, receiving fewer votes than perennial joke candidate Żaren tal-Ajkla.

Campaigning strongly against illegal immigrants, Lowell was the party's sole candidate in the March 2008 parliamentary election, contesting both the 11th and 12th Districts. He obtained 84 votes on first count from both districts, obtaining 0.03% of the overall votes.

=== Post-Lowell era (2025-) ===
On 9 February 2025, Terrence Portelli took over the leadership of the party. While Portelli was a candidate for the 2024 European Parliament election in Malta he campaigned on implementing a classical Athenian democracy and withdrawing from the Euro, replacing it with a restored gold-backed Maltese lira. Portelli resigned as party leader in 2026, citing personal reasons and time constraints. He was succeeded as leader by Eman Cross.

Cross previously founded and led the party's short-lived youth wing until being permanently expelled by Lowell for "bad character and aggressive behaviour", after Cross was charged with threatening his mother with an illegal firearm. Cross ultimately went to court where he pleaded not guilty to threatening his mother and her partner but guilty of breaching a probation order and to unlawfully possessing a weapon. He was sentenced to a treatment order for an alcohol problem. He plead guilty to breaching his bail conditions after police found him in a bar past his curfew in 2024.

== Ideology ==
Imperium Europa is positioned on the far-right on the political spectrum and it has been frequently described as a neo-Nazi, neo-fascist, right-wing populist, and radical right party. As stated in its program, its goal is to unite all European natives under one flag, hence the name "Imperium Europa", leading to "a Europid bond forged through spirituality (cosmotheism, not Christianity) closely followed by race, nurtured through high culture, protected by high politics, enforced by the elite." Imperium Europa is also opposed to immigration. Imperium Europa has connections with the French Nouvelle Droite, and also with the Italian party Lega Lombarda. Its leader, Lowell, has repeatedly expressed admiration for Adolf Hitler, and the former United States presidential candidate Ron Paul.

Logo of Imperium's youth wing Malta Right-Wing Youths

== Party programmes ==
=== Proposal for institutional reform ===
The party initially advocated a temporary national unity government, a dual system of elitist and democratic elements in order to protect the elite minority whilst simultaneously allowing democratic freedom. This would occur by having the populace democratically elect a President, who would select experts from every field to form a technocratic Cabinet, similar to that formed by Lamberto Dini in Italy in 1995.

Concurrently, there would still be the current Parliament, informing the nation of the cabinet's policies while simultaneously gathering feedback. After four years, a referendum would be held to determine whether the people want this system or go back to the parliamentary representative democratic system. If the former is chosen, the President and technocrats would carry on for another five years, while the parliamentarians would be dismissed with an attractive pension in return.

=== Other priorities ===
- 10% flat rate VAT and the abolition of income tax.
- Implementation of a dynamic foreign policy, prioritising white ethnic interests first.
- A planned approach to the construction industry, by demolishing all modern buildings with the intention of returning the built environment to the state it was 150 years prior.
- Abolition of victimless crimes.
- Building an artificial island which would be used to generate energy and simultaneously serve as a landfill.
- Free access to in vitro fertilisation for white people.
- Gun rights for white people, advocating for a regulated system where all firearms can be carried; both for open carry and/or concealed carry.
- A massive reduction in the welfare state, under the guise that it is unfair for the taxpayer to be treated as a 'cash cow' for the social ills.
- A financial grant of €10,000 for every child birthed.
- Privatisation of state entities, such as hospitals.
- More research given to develop a semiconductor industry in Malta for the EU to become more self-sufficient in technological advancements in the future.
- Repealing the European Green Deal on the grounds that restrictions on business harm the EU and make it uncompetitive in the world stage.
- Extraction of natural resources, most notably the oil and gas reserves allegedly found around the archipelago.
- A creation of a new currency, that is backed by gold and other rare precious metals.
- A system of direct democracy where members of a particular locality attend town hall meetings in order to make a decision taken for the respective locality via referendum.
- Encouraging abortion as a form of mercy-killing if severe prenatal disabilities are detected whilst prohibiting it for healthy white births.

== Political activities ==
=== Public events ===
Imperium Europa primarily organises three activities/events, all once annually. These are: 9 February party founding anniversary, the celebration of Lowell's birthday, taking place in 29 July, and the commemoration of the Maltese and the Knights Hospitaller forces, obtaining a decisive victory in the Great Siege of Malta, occurring in 1565, with a wreath of flowers placed in front of the Great Siege Monument in Valletta. This activity occurs in Otto Settembre.

=== Media outreach ===
The party also uploads political and party related content on its three YouTube channels; named Maltastory, VoiceofTheNewRight and RightLibertarianMalta respectively. Party conferences and notices are also uploaded on Norman Lowell's Facebook page. Party social media accounts are frequently banned off social media platforms.

== Election results ==
=== House of Representatives ===
Election	Leader	Votes	%	Seats	+/–	Position	Government
2008	Norman Lowell	84	0.03	0 / 69	New	5th	Extra-parliamentary
2026	Eman Alexander Cross	167	0.05	0 / 67	0	6th	Extra-parliamentary

=== European Parliament ===
Election	Leader	Votes	%	Seats	+/–	Rank	EP Group
2004	Norman Lowell	1,603	0.65	0 / 5	New	4th	–
2009	Norman Lowell	3,637	1.47	0 / 6	0	4th	–
2014	Norman Lowell	6,761	2.62	0 / 6	0	4th	–
2019	Norman Lowell	8,238	3.17	0 / 6	0	3rd	–
2024	Norman Lowell	6,816	2.62	0 / 6	0	3rd	–
