= Norman Lowell =

Maltese far-right figure (born 1946)

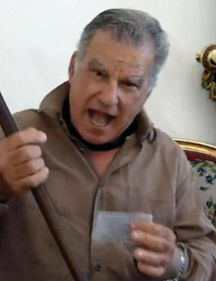

Leader of Imperium Europa
- In office 9 February 2000 – 9 February 2025
- Succeeded by: Terrence Portelli

Personal details
- Born: 29 July 1946 (age 80) Valletta, Malta
- Party: Imperium Europa
- Occupation: Politician; artist; banker

Norman Lowell (born 29 July 1946) is a Maltese ultranationalist writer, founder, and former leader of Imperium Europa, a far-right political party. He is also a retired banker and artist.

== Politics ==
Imperium Europa advocates Europe as a homeland for White people. The party's remit is to unite "all European natives" (i.e., European-descended peoples, but not non-European-descended immigrants born in Europe) under one flag, hence the name "Imperium Europa" (European Empire), leading to "a Europid bond forged through Spirituality closely followed by Race, nurtured through High culture, protected by High politics, enforced by the Elite." In his formulation Lowell combines Cosmotheism and the ideas of Francis Parker Yockey's Imperium.

Lowell contested the first European Parliament elections that were held in Malta on 12 June 2004, obtaining 1,603 first-count votes from a total of 250,691 votes cast (0.64%). Lowell again contested the European Parliamentary elections in Malta on 6 June 2009. He received 3,559 votes, out of 322,411 cast, for just over one percent of the vote. In the 2014 MEP elections Lowell again doubled his votes to over 7,000, this time surpassing the Green Party's leader Arnold Cassola.

In May 2019, Lowell once again contested the European Parliament election. This time, he obtained 9,693 votes from a total of 270,022 votes cast (3.59%). This result makes Imperium Europa the third most popular party in Malta.

Campaigning heavily against illegal immigrants, Lowell was the party's candidate in the 11th and 12th Districts in the March 2008 parliamentary election. He obtained 84 votes on first count from both districts, obtaining 0.03% of the overall votes.

Lowell is a staunch supporter and admirer of Carmelo Borg Pisani, the Maltese-born Italian Fascist, who, on the grounds that British rule was destroying Malta's Latin soul, advocated the expulsion of the British and joined, to this effect, the National Fascist Party. Pisani was executed for treason by British colonial authorities in 1942. Lowell is known for the quotes "Carmelo Borg Pisani, presente!" and "Onore a Carmelo Borg Pisani!" during a tribute to him in an interview on the television network One, where Lowell, during an interview, asked the presenter for a minute to remember Borg Pisani, stood up, and began exclaiming these quotes whilst holding a staff in his hands.

=== Political descriptions ===
Because of comments denigrating African migrants to the country as well as his reliance on antisemitic rhetoric and conspiracy theories about Jews, Lowell has been described as racist, an extremist, and a Nazi sympathizer. Lowell argues that he is "neither a Nazi nor a Fascist nor a Neo-Nazi" and that he would be "booted out of a Nazi party within five minutes" because he's "a strong libertarian", but he has, nevertheless, described Mein Kampf as "The Book" and Adolf Hitler as "The Hero", and called the Nazi Holocaust a "holy hoax". He has also praised Iranian president Mahmoud Ahmadinejad. He has also expressed support for eugenics, saying he supports the euthanization of disabled children and "horribly deformed" people.

== Books ==
Lowell is the author of Credo: A Book for the Very Few, Imperium Europa – A Book that Changed the World, Aristocratic Manifesto for Imperium Europa (Arktos, 2019), and Jesus the Usurper: Murderer of Christ.

== Dionysian Action Painting ==
Lowell is an artist in his own abstract style, which he labels "Dionysian Action Painting". He describes it as an ancient Greek art form based around "intoxication, frenzy, ecstasy, barbaric instincts". He says it captures feelings, rather than figures, and is the sublimation of the beast in man into art.

== Controversies ==
On 27 March 2008 Lowell was sentenced to a two-year jail term, suspended for four years, due to his conviction on three charges of racial hatred, and one charge of insulting the President of Malta. He won the case relating to insults hurled at the President of Malta on grounds of freedom of speech but was also ordered to pay a fine of 500 Euros for racist terminology against Jews. Judge Quintano ruled that while a politician is free, this freedom is limited by the fact that Jews make up a part of the Maltese society and that no matter how small that part is, such talk constitutes racial hatred.

Speaking outside the courthouse, Lowell told reporters, and a small crowd, "this is a sad day, a very sad day for the Maltese. The lights of freedom have been extinguished. We are going back to the medieval ages. The media will be the first victims of the establishment since they have to be extra careful on how they report items."

On 10 January 2006 Lowell filed a civil libel suit against Malta Today editor Saviour Balzan. Lowell contends that two of the publication's articles, one entitled "Norman Lowell organises BBQ", and another entitled "Lowell’s neo-Nazis hit out at press after arson attack", as well as an editorial entitled "Get the bastards now, before it is too late", constitute a "coordinated, strategic, and orchestrated" effort to undermine his public reputation.

On 30 April 2019, during a meeting of his party, Imperium Europa, Lowell compared Auschwitz concentration camp to the "Disneyland of Poland". When asked whether he denied the Holocaust happened, he said: "How can one deny something that never happened? ... This whole hoax is the biggest lie since the Virgin Mary."
