= 2019 European Parliament election in Malta =

- 25 May 2019

All 6 Maltese seats in the European Parliament
- Turnout: 72.66%
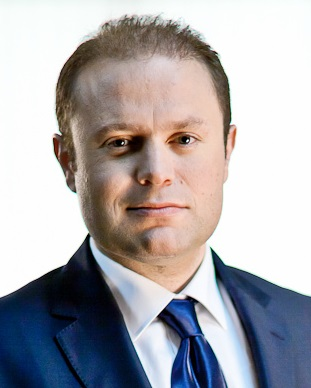

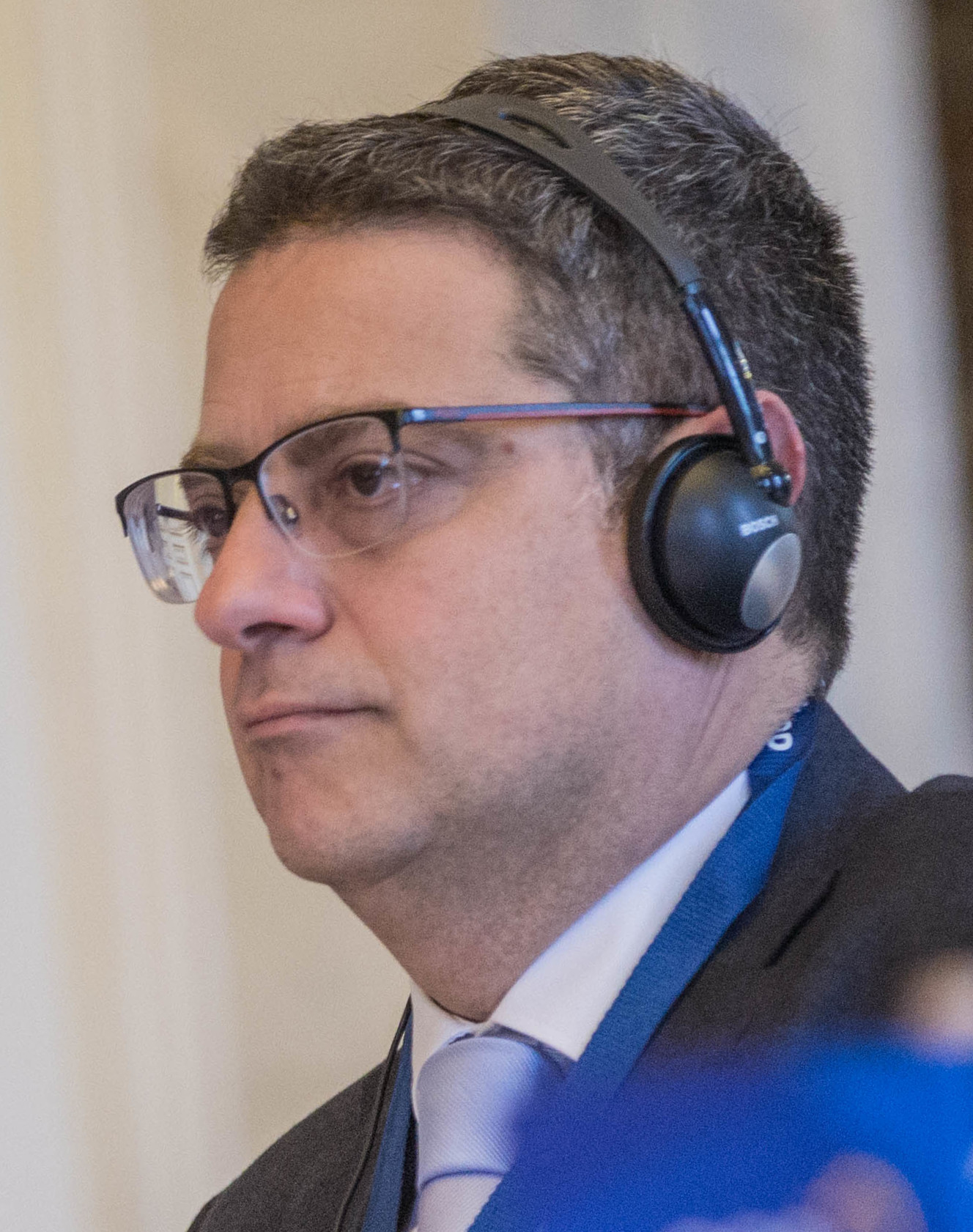
	First party	Second party
Leader	Joseph Muscat	Adrian Delia
Party	Labour	Nationalist
Alliance	S&D	EPP
Last election	3 seats, 53.39%	3 seats, 40.02%
Seats won	4	2
Seat change	▲1	▼1
Popular vote	141,267	98,611
Percentage	54.29%	37.90%
Swing	▲0.90	▼2.12

The 2019 European Parliament election was held in Malta on 25 May 2019. 8 different political parties took part in the election, of which, only 2 won seats in the European Parliament; the Labour Party and the Nationalist Party, with 4 and 2 seats respectively.

== Contesting parties ==
=== Alleanza Bidla ===
Ivan Grech Mintoff and Rebecca Dalli Gonzi contested on behalf of Alleanza Bidla. a conservative Christian and Eurosceptic party.

=== Brain, Not Ego ===
Antoine P. Borg contested on behalf of fledgling political party Brain, Not Ego.

=== Democratic Alternative ===
Democratic Alternative announced the approval of its 3 European parliamentary election candidates. They were: Arnold Cassola, Mina Tolu and Carmel Cacopardo. In the wake of a dispute regarding the topic of abortion, Cassola resigned from Democratic Alternative and contested the EP election as an independent candidate.

=== Democratic Party ===
The Democratic Party announced the approval of its 4 European parliamentary election candidates, They were: Martin Cauchi Inglott, Anthony Buttigieg, Godfrey Farrugia and Camilla Appelgren.

=== Imperium Europa ===
Norman Lowell announced that he would once again contest the European parliamentary election after Imperium Europa was officially registered with the Electoral Commission.

=== Independents ===
Arnold Cassola announced that he would contest the European parliamentary election as an independent candidate. Stephen Florian announced that he would contest as an Independent candidate after resigning from the executive of the Moviment Patrijotti Maltin. Other independent candidates included Nazzareno Bonnici (Partit Ta' L-Ajkla), Mario Borg and Joseph Aquilina.

=== Labour Party ===
The Labour Party announced the approval of its 14 European parliamentary election candidates. They were: Alfred Sant, Mary Gauci, Lorna Vassallo, Robert Micallef, Cyrus Engerer, Alex Agius Saliba, Felix Busuttil, Miriam Dalli, James Grech, Joe Sammut, Josianne Cutajar, Fleur Vella, Noel Cassar and Josef Caruana.

=== Moviment Patrijotti Maltin ===
Simon Borg and Naged Magelly contested on behalf of Moviment Patrijotti Maltin, an offshoot of the anti-immigration group Għaqda Patrijotti Maltin led by Henry Battistino which campaigns against irregular migration, Malta's participation in the Schengen Area, and Islam in Malta.

=== Nationalist Party ===
The Nationalist Party announced the approval of its 10 European parliamentary election candidates. They were: Roberta Metsola, David Casa, Francis Zammit Dimech, Peter Agius, Dione Borg, Michael Briguglio, Frank Psaila, Roselyn Borg Knight, Michael Mercieca and David Stellini.

== Opinion polls ==
=== Expressing a preference ===
The values in the table below are derived by removing non-party responses (i.e. non-voters and "don't know"); as the margin is also recalculated, there may be slight differences in exact lead margins due to rounding.

Polling firm	Fieldwork date	Sample size	PL	PN	PD	AD	IE	MPM	Others	Lead
2019 election	25 May 2019	–	54.3	37.9	2.0	0.7	3.2	0.3	1.6	16.4
Sagalytics	11–17 May 2019	600	56.9	37.3	1.1	2.0	1.7	–	1.1	19.6
MaltaToday	9–15 May 2019	849	57.8	39.1	0.4	1.0	1.5	0.1	0.0	18.8
MISCO	8–11 May 2019	402	55.0	40.0	<1	<1	–	–	3.4	15.0
MaltaToday	25 Apr–3 May 2019	602	58.0	38.1	1.1	1.3	1.6	0.0	0.0	19.8
Sagalytics	23 Apr–2 May 2019	600	55.2	39.0	–	–	–	–	5.8	16.2
MaltaToday	28 Mar–4 Apr 2019	597	62.5	37.5	0.0	0.0	0.0	0.0	0.0	25.0
MISCO	27–29 Mar 2019	402	59	37	2	2	–	–	–	22
MaltaToday	22–27 Feb 2019	598	59.5	38.4	1.3	0.8	0.0	0.0	0.0	21.1
MaltaToday	21–28 Jan 2019	597	62.6	36.4	0.4	0.6	0.0	0.0	0.0	26.2
2014 election	25 May 2014	–	53.4	40.0	–	2.9	2.7	–	1.0	13.4

=== Complete data ===
Polling firm	Fieldwork date	Sample size	PL	PN	PD	AD	IE	MPM	Others	Lead	Not voting	Don't know/invalid
2019 election	25 May 2019	–	38.0	26.5	1.4	0.5	2.2	0.2	1.1	11.5	27.3	2.6
Sagalytics	11–17 May 2019	600	56.9	37.3	1.1	2.0	1.7	–	1.1	19.6	–	–
MaltaToday	9–15 May 2019	849	41.3	27.9	0.3	0.7	1.1	0.1	0.0	13.4	9.2	18.6
MISCO	8–11 May 2019	402	41.4	30.1	<0.8	<0.8	–	–	2.6	11.3	22.0	11.0
MaltaToday	25 Apr–3 May 2019	602	44.1	29.0	0.8	1.0	1.2	0.0	0.0	15.1	9.8	12.4
Sagalytics	23 Apr–2 May 2019	600	55.2	39.0	–	–	–	–	5.8	16.2	–	–
MaltaToday	28 Mar–4 Apr 2019	597	41.8	25.1	0.0	0.0	0.0	0.0	0.0	16.7	13.8	17.3
MISCO	27–29 Mar 2019	402	40	25	1.5	1.5	–	–	–	15	32	–
MaltaToday	22–27 Feb 2019	598	42.3	27.3	0.9	0.6	0.0	0.0	0.0	15.0	13.2	13.9
MaltaToday	21–28 Jan 2019	597	42.0	24.4	0.3	0.4	0.0	0.0	0.0	17.6	12.8	19.3
2014 election	25 May 2014	–	39.0	29.3	–	2.2	2.0	–	0.7	13.4	26.9	–

== Results ==
Shortly after the first exit polls were announced, it was thought that Labour Party had a majority of 51,600 votes over the Nationalist Party, but this was later decreased to 42,656 after the official results came out. Although a large majority for Labour was expected, as well as Labour winning 4 out of 6 seats, the majority was unexpected and historic. Adrian Delia, the leader of the opposition, conceded defeat. He did state, however, that he would not resign because of the result and that his aim was still the next Maltese general election. Although the far-right political party Imperium Europa increased their vote share from 2.68% in the 2014 European Parliament election to 3.17% (at 8,238 votes) in the current election, this was far less than initially thought by the Maltese media, who had thought that they had received about 15,000 votes. The Democratic Party on the other hand, then the only third party in the Maltese Parliament, only managed to get 5,276 votes, with Camilla Appelgren defying expectations by not only getting 3,052 votes, but also beating her own party leader Godfrey Farrugia, who only managed to get 1,668 votes.

Party	Votes	%	Seats	+/–
Labour Party	141,267	54.29	4	+1
Nationalist Party	98,611	37.90	2	–1
Imperium Europa	8,238	3.17	0	0
Democratic Party	5,276	2.03	0	New
Democratic Alternative	1,866	0.72	0	0
Alleanza Bidla	1,186	0.46	0	0
Moviment Patrijotti Maltin	771	0.30	0	New
Brain, Not Ego	323	0.12	0	New
Independents	2,674	1.03	0	0
Total	260,212	100.00	6	0
Valid votes	260,212	96.37		
Invalid/blank votes	9,810	3.63		
Total votes	270,022	100.00		
Registered voters/turnout	371,643	72.66		
Source: Electoral Commission

The elected candidates were:

MEPs elected
Candidate	Party	1st Pref.	Count
Miriam Dalli	PL	63,438	1
Roberta Metsola	PN	38,206	1
Alfred Sant	PL	26,592	14
David Casa	PN	20,493	38
Alex Agius Saliba	PL	18,808	39
Josianne Cutajar	PL	15,603	39
