= Malta–Gozo Tunnel =

Planned undersea road tunnel

Overview
- Location: Nadur (Gozo) and Manikata (Malta)

Operation
- Work began: suspended without a deadline, plans shelved
- Traffic: Automobile and public transport vehicles
- Vehicles per day: 6,500 (predicted)

Technical
- Length: 13 km (8.1 mi)
- No. of lanes: 2 lanes (1 each way with an additional emergency lane)
- Width: 3.25–3.50 m (10.7–11.5 ft) (projected)

Route map
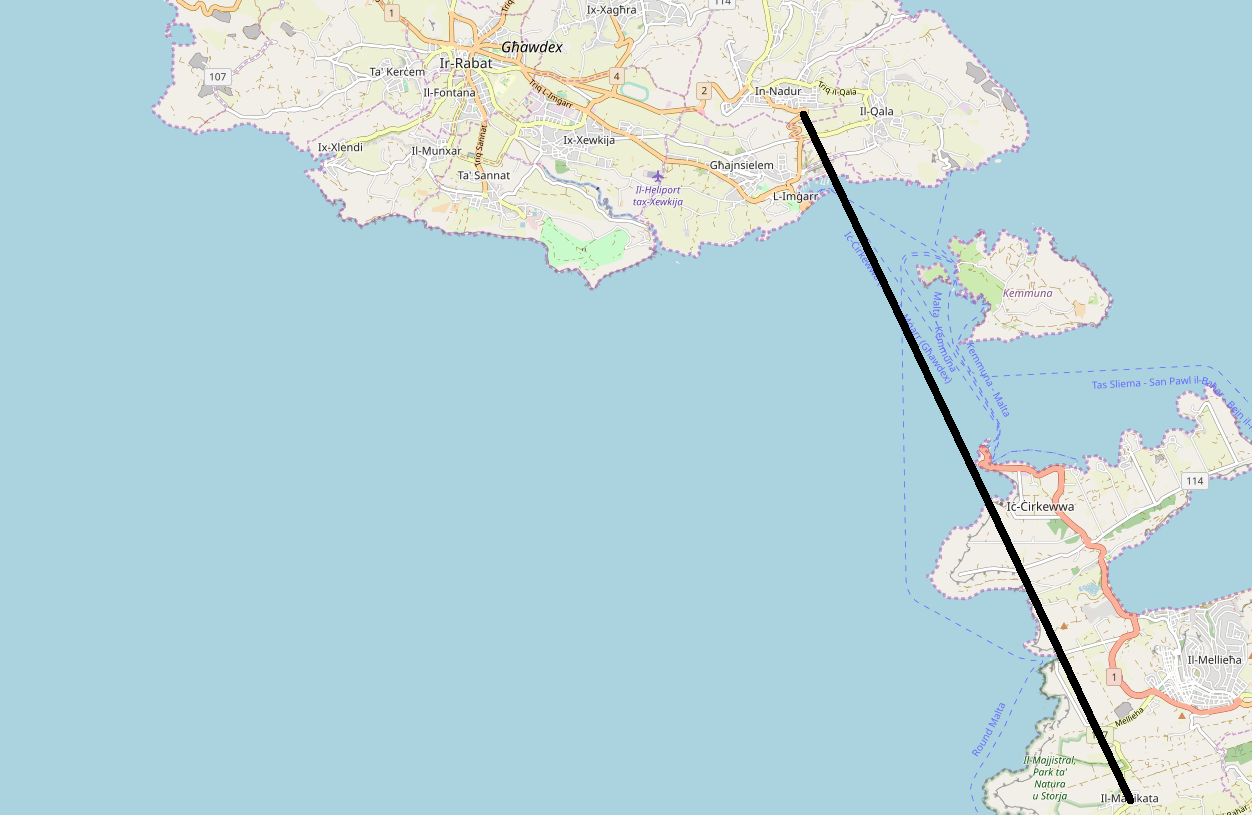

The Malta–Gozo Tunnel was a planned undersea tunnel between the islands of Malta and Gozo, both part of the Republic of Malta. The tunnel would have replaced the Gozo Channel Line, the current inter-island ferry service, between Ċirkewwa in Malta and Mġarr in Gozo.

In October 2022, plans were shelved.

== Background and purpose ==
The Government of Malta has embarked on a long-term strategy to address the accessibility between Malta and Gozo, addressing the everyday problems being experienced by Gozitans to travel to Malta to their place of work.

Transport Malta, addressing the constant yearly increase of the number of vehicles crossing between Malta and Gozo, has stated that the introduction of a fixed link would:

- Reduce average journey times between Gozo and Malta by at least 40 minutes, and the tunnel would ensure that commuters have more control on their travelling schedule.
- Provide a second means of travel between the two islands.
- Reap benefits from increase in influx of tourism.
- Increases in general economic activities.

Transport Malta stated that the project works are expected to be divided in the following main phases and approximate durations:

- Planning and Design: 3 years
- Mobilization at the portal areas: 3 months
- Excavation works: 3 years
- Finishing works: 1 year
- Testing and completion: 3 months
- Operation and financing: 20 years
- Hand-over and commissioning to Transport Malta: 6 months

== History ==
=== Discussion (pre-2011) ===
Discussions for the development of a Malta–Gozo tunnel, or a general permanent link between Malta and Gozo, were first discussed in the late 1960s at the Gozo Civic Council – the first type of regional committee in the Maltese islands. Society for the Union of the Maltese Islands (SUMI) was especially established to advocate the construction of a permanent link between the islands. SUMI's chairman, Cauchi, underlined that “the unification of the national territory is a National Issue, and it is unhighly patriotic of any Maltese to oppose what should be an eminently non-controversial cause… future generations will cast shame and dishonour on those who will have done so”. Cauchi believed that “unity at all levels is a most indispensable asset in such a small nation as Malta, where the collective effort of all the component parts of the country and of every citizen should be channelled to the attainment of economic viability”.

In March 1972 the Maltese government commissioned the Overseas Technical Cooperation Agency of the Government of Japan to carry out a preliminary survey report on a possible permanent link between the two islands. Since then no notable talks about a tunnel were discussed until 2011.

=== Discussion (2011–present) ===
Talks for the development of a Malta–Gozo tunnel resumed most notably in February 2011, when Chris Said, the former Parliamentary Secretary for Public Dialogue and Information, talked about the ramifications of a tunnel link between Malta and Gozo.

The Malta–Gozo tunnel is set to run between Imbordin in St. Paul's Bay and Ta’ Kenuna in Nadur, according to studies being considered by the government. The Malta–Gozo tunnel will be 13 km-long tunnel and is planned to have a seven-metre radius and one traffic lane heading in either direction, with an additional emergency lane. The tunnel project is estimated to cost €300 million, with a lifetime of around 100 years. The planning and design of the tunnel is expected to take place till 2021 or 2022. Excavation of the tunnel is expected to take place till 2021 or 2022 and finishing works till 2023. This concludes that the tunnel will be ready by 2024.

The main proposed tunnel's purpose is to make it easier for Gozitans, mostly workers and students, to arrive to Malta without using the Gozo Channel Line ferry. The tunnel can also cause the Gozo ferries to eventually wear out and will have to be decommissioned by 2030, according to projections by economist Gordon Cordina. Cordina also predicted that the replacement will cost around €120 million, with maintenance and fuel costs estimated at a further €21 million per year.

On 3 November 2017, Capital Projects Minister Ian Borg said that a phase of studies has been carried out, from 18 October 2017, as part of the Malta–Gozo tunnel project. Borg said in a statement that contractor Geotec Spa, which won a tender in June 2017, started extracting investigative samples from different spots on land and at sea. Borg also added that, "this is being done in collaboration with the Environmental Resources Authority to ensure the least environmental impact possible".

Michael Grech, an ex-President of the Gozo Business Chamber and a member of the sub-committee on the Malta–Gozo tunnel said, "there is a whole host of benefits for the island which would include the possible return of Gozitans from Malta, more economic prosperity and more manageable flows of tourists and Maltese on holiday."

On 2 June 2018, Prime Minister Joseph Muscat had said work on the tunnel linking Malta and Gozo should start before the end of this legislature and could be finalized as soon as 2024.

On 11 December 2018, the Ministry for Transport confirmed that the Malta–Gozo tunnel project plans are expected to be published within May or June 2019. The Ministry stated that “It is intended that the tunnel will have two lanes, one in each direction, width of 3.25m to 3.50m, a central buffer area in between with a width of approx. 1.00m, and a 1.00m wide shoulder on both sides of the carriageway.” The Ministry also added that the tunnel structure itself will be constructed with concrete segments and include infrastructural systems for ventilation, illumination, water drainage and pumping. Ian Borg said the tender for the design, building, maintenance, and operation of the tunnel would be published some time in 2019.

On 29 November 2020, Nationalist Party leader, Bernard Grech, suggested that a referendum should take place among Gozitans regarding the decision on the tunnel. Gozo Business Chamber reacted negatively to the proposal, saying that "The feasibility of the Gozo-Malta tunnel should be determined through technical studies and not a referendum".

On 4 April 2021, Infrastructure Malta stated that the COVID-19 pandemic has affected plans for the Malta–Gozo tunnel project.

In October 2022 an ambitious plan to have the two islands of Malta and Gozo connected by a subsea tunnel has been shelved. The sources, privy to the consultation and plans that took place on the bipartisan project launched right before 2013, said the billion-euro tunnel project would not be taking place in the foreseeable future.

== Public opinion ==
=== Surveys ===
In May 2017, Marvin Formosa, a Maltese sociologist, carried out a social impact assessment among 250 Gozitans, which found that 82% of respondents were in favor of the tunnel. The survey found that younger respondents favored the project more than older respondents and a similar trend was observed amongst those with different education and employment levels: those attaining a higher level or education and those in employment favoured the project. Formosa said that 4.4% of the survey's respondents said there were no advantages to the tunnel while 46.6% said they could not think of any disadvantages.

Marvin Formosa also carried out another social impact assessment report. His report stated that the main reasons the respondents stated about why they support the tunnel project is that it would create more work for Gozitans, ease the accessibility between Malta and Gozo, decrease the traveling time between Gozo and Malta and increase levels of Gozitans socializing with the Maltese people and vice versa.

Between 5 November and 8 November 2018, a survey conducted by Malta Today among 600 people across Malta and Gozo found that 63.1% of people agree with the construction of a Malta–Gozo tunnel, while 24.4% disagree. It found out that 66% of Gozitans agreed with a construction of a tunnel, 9.5% opposed it, and 24.5% were unsure.

From the political parties' side, 74.7% and 48.8% of Labour Party voters and Nationalist Party voters agree with the project respectively, while 37.9% disagreed with the project.

=== Support ===
The most notable organisation in favour of the tunnel project is Front Favur Il-Mina (FFM), a group founded by some university students in December 2015.

The Gozo University Group is also in favour of the project, stating that “just like the 82% of the Gozitan population, the organisation is in favour of the tunnel project and believes that it would be beneficial to all Gozitans who travel to work and study on the mother island and also for the economy of the Gozitan island to flourish.”

Godfrey Baldacchino, a sociologist and island scholar, favours a tunnel between Malta and Gozo to be modelled on the link connecting Prince Edward Island and mainland Canada. However, he thinks such a tunnel should be connected to a national metro as an alternative to private transport, which he sees overwhelming Malta's roads. "[We] should at least discuss what kind of mobility we wish any tunnel to serve", he concludes. For the metro, Baldacchino suggests taking inspiration from Mauritius—whose modern history, economic niches, politics, geography, and other features he likens with Malta's. Mauritius' light rail metro, spanning twenty-six kilometres, was built overground in the late 2010s. At the same time, he said in a separate study, a bridge or tunnel would diminish Gozitan demands for self-rule.

== Political opinions ==
Politicians elected from the Gozitan district are generally in favour of this policy agenda. In 2008, Anton Refalo, the former Minister for Gozo, spoke favorably of a permanent link between the two islands on the basis that this would facilitate communication and transportation links and stop Gozo's dependence on the ferry service as the only means of transport. In 2011, Franco Mercieca, an elected parliamentarian from the Gozitan district, published an article in Gozo News calling for and supporting a permanent link between the islands. In 2016, Franco Mercieca wrote another article calling for easier accessibility between Malta and Gozo, however he also stated that he isn't surprised about people who criticize the project, stating that Gozo might lose its characteristics.

Alan Deidun, a former politician, was not in favour of a permanent link between the island of Gozo and Malta. In 2010, Deidun wrote that “Gozo should not become a carbon copy of Ibiza but instead should market its untamed, wild aspects. Safeguarding and promoting Gozo's uniqueness must be surely be the wisest tourism marketing strategy”.

In January 2016, the Nationalist Party organized a General Convention on Gozo, with one news testimony reporting that the “debate on having a permanent link between Malta and Gozo was high on the agenda, with all speakers, ranging from University students to entrepreneur Michael Carauna, backing the idea” on the basis that such “a huge investment would reverse Gozo's brain drain and boost its economy”.

In its programme for the 2022 general election, the Volt Malta party proposes to pause the project until the studies on the project have been completed to ensure that the project is worthwhile.

== Concerns ==
=== Environmental ===
In June 2018, a study was conducted about the environmental impact of the tunnel. The study stated that about one million cubic metres of rock will be dragged out during the excavation of the tunnel, adding that it's more than the entire amount of construction waste disposed in a single year in Malta.

On 6 July 2018, the Democratic Party has demanded that the government declares what its plans are, with regards to construction and demolition waste, describing it as a “construction waste crisis.” The party stated that the projected tunnel project “will generate over one million tons of excavation waste,” which it said, “is almost equivalent to what the construction industry generates in a whole year.”

On 13 December 2018, Arnold Cassola, Democratic Alternative's party candidate for the MEP elections, and the former secretary general of the European Green Party, wrote an article for Times of Malta criticizing the development of the tunnel project, ending the article saying, "History, together with present and future Maltese and Gozitan generations, will damn you all for the wanton destruction of our country."

On 19 December 2018, Keith Buhagiar, a Maltese archaeologist, stated, "The excavation of the tunnel entrance, on the Malta-side portal, in the hamlet of L-Imbordin will destroy troglodyte dwellings dating back to the late medieval period, fertile agricultural land and other archaeological culturally-relevant remains".

On 22 December 2018, a public activity on climate change was organized by ADŻ Green Youth — the youth wing of the Democratic Alternative party — at City Gate in Valletta. Carmel Cacopardo, leader of the Democratic Alternative party and candidate for the European Parliament elections of 2019 and Mina Tolu, also a candidate for the 2019 European Parliament elections, addressed those present at the public activity. Cacopardo stated that the proposed tunnel is “essentially a tunnel for the use of cars not for people. In fact it is estimated that the vehicle movement between the two islands is projected to increase from 3000 to 9000 vehicle movements daily over a fifteen year period.” Cacopardo added that “a service provided for the movement of people would be a fast ferry service: from Gozo to the commercial centres of Malta. The encouragement of the use of cars is central to the projected tunnel as tolls are paid and collected from car owners.” Mina Tolu stated that “We need investment to ensure efficient use of energy, as well as to ensure the transition to a sustainable economy and hundred per cent clean energy that better everyone's quality of life and combat climate change.”

On 6 January 2019, Carmel Cacopardo, referring to the National Transport Master Plan 2025 approved for Malta in 2015, said that the plan is the solution to most of Malta's sustainable mobility issues. Cacopardo also believes the solution to the problem requires alternatives to the use of private cars and that the development of a tunnel is not one of them.

=== Proposed alternatives ===
On 13 September 2016, Simon Busuttil, the former leader of the Nationalist Party, provided an alternative to the tunnel project by proposing the setting up of a modern train system for Malta and Gozo, saying that the way traffic congestion is increasing will soon make it difficult to go around the islands.

On 3 September 2018, Alfred Sant, the former Prime Minister of Malta between 1996 and 1998 and current MEP, provided an alternative to the tunnel project by calling for a light railway system to be built to link Malta and Gozo. Sant said, "a metro network, similar to the London Underground, Glasgow Subway or Newcastle Metro could be a better option for Malta in the long run".
