= 1948 Gozo luzzu disaster =

Capsizing of a fishing boat near Malta

- Date: 30 October 1948
- Time: Around 20:00
- Location: Gozo Channel, off Qala, Gozo, Malta; 36°01′30″N 14°19′00″E
- Type: Capsizing
- Cause: Overloading
- Participants: 27 (2 crew members, 25 passengers)
- Deaths: 23

The 1948 Gozo luzzu disaster occurred on 30 October 1948 when a luzzu fishing boat carrying passengers from Marfa, on the island of Malta, to Mġarr, Gozo, capsized and sank in rough seas off Qala, in the colony of Malta, killing 23 of the 27 people on board. Inquiries held after the accident determined that the boat had been overloaded as it was carrying around double its capacity.

== Background ==
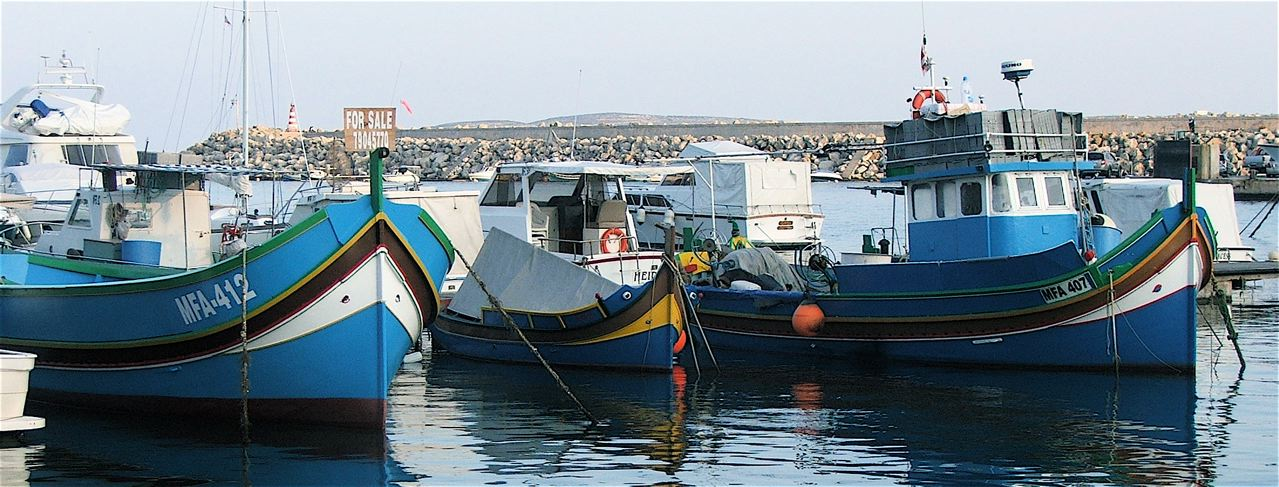
Luzzu fishing boats in Gozo's Mġarr harbour in 2009

On 30 October 1948, the Gozo ferry MV Bancinu left the harbour of Mġarr, Gozo at 13:15 and, due to strong winds from the southwest, landed its passengers at St. Paul's Bay on the island of Malta instead of at the usual berthing place at Marfa. This journey lasted longer than the usual route, and disembarkation at St. Paul's Bay was also slower, so the next scheduled crossing from Marfa of 16:30 was cancelled. However, some passengers who had intended to board this ferry had already departed by bus from Valletta. The manager of the ferry service, Mariano Xuereb, promised the stranded passengers that a luzzu (a traditional fishing boat) would be provided to take the passengers from Marfa to Gozo, but then changed his mind and did not send the boat.

A policeman who was among the stranded passengers phoned his superiors in Gozo, who then informed Sergeant S. Galea, a policeman on duty at Mġarr, and directed him to make arrangements to pick up the passengers. Another luzzu crewed by Salvu Refalo and Karmnu Grima was sent, and all 25 stranded passengers (24 men and 1 woman) boarded the boat. The number of people on the boat was higher than expected, and despite Refalo and Grima's proposal to make two trips, the passengers insisted on making a single crossing.

== Sinking ==
The luzzu departed Marfa in calm seas, and the trip proceeded uneventfully until the boat passed the island of Comino. At this point, the seas became rougher due to the wind direction, and the coxswain told the passengers that it would be better to head to the bay of Ħondoq ir-Rummien than the harbour of Mġarr. However, the passengers disagreed and insisted on going directly to Mġarr.

As the boat was being battered by the waves, one of the passengers, M.U.S.E.U.M. member Leli Camilleri, invited them to pray the rosary. At around 20:00, when the boat was about 50 metres (160 ft) away from the shore near an area known as Il-Ġolf taċ-Ċawl, water began to enter the boat. The passengers panicked, and the luzzu capsized. One of the passengers, Karmnu Attard, managed to swim to shore and went to the village of Qala to call the police at Mġarr, informing the authorities about the accident.

== Rescue and recovery efforts ==
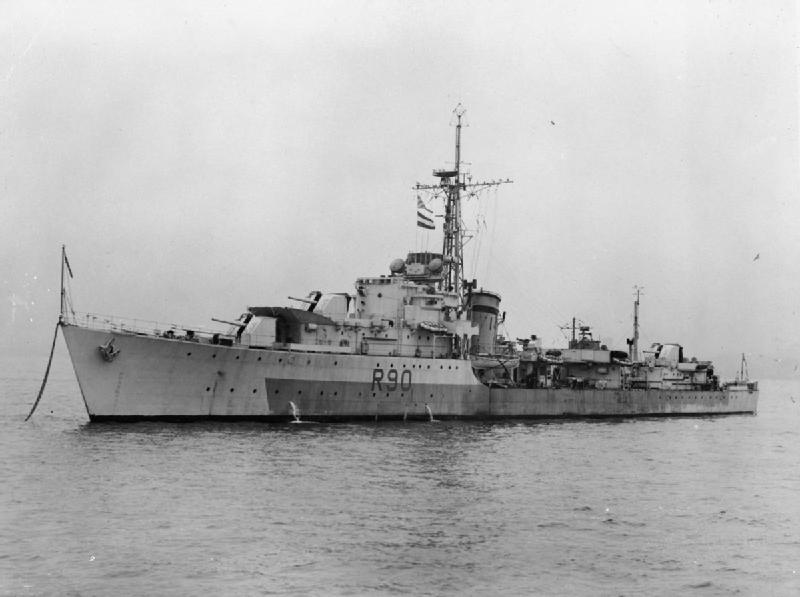
The Royal Navy destroyer HMS Cheviot was involved in the search and recovery operations

The search and rescue operation was undertaken by the police, the Royal Navy, the Royal Air Force, and some Gozitan civilians. The destroyer HMS Cheviot was sent to the area, as were a torpedo recovery boat and an RAF launch. The sunken luzzu was discovered and it was recovered from the seabed.

Apart from Attard, three other passengers had managed to swim to shore, while the remaining 23 people on board died. One of the survivors had reached the Blata taċ-Ċawl and had to be hoisted up a cliff to safety. The survivors were taken to the Gozo Hospital.

Seven corpses were recovered by 1 November. RAF aircraft and naval and police vessels continued the search and recovered the remaining bodies over the next few days. Some bodies were found in Fomm ir-Riħ six days after the sinking. Post mortem examinations found that most of the victims died of asphyxia due to drowning, while others died of cerebral contusions and shock.

== Aftermath ==
Governor Francis Douglas, Prime Minister Paul Boffa, Nationalist Party leader Enrico Mizzi, and Democratic Action Party leader Giuseppe Hyzler expressed condolences to the families of the victims.

A funeral for the first seven victims was held at the Cathedral of the Assumption in Victoria, Gozo on 3 November. Mass was celebrated by Bishop Giuseppe Pace, and it was attended by Prime Minister Boffa, Commissioner for Gozo Edgar Montanaro, a representative for the Governor, Gozitan members of parliament and clergy, as well as RAF and police detachments along with the families of the victims. Funerals for other victims were held separately in their hometowns.

=== Inquiry ===
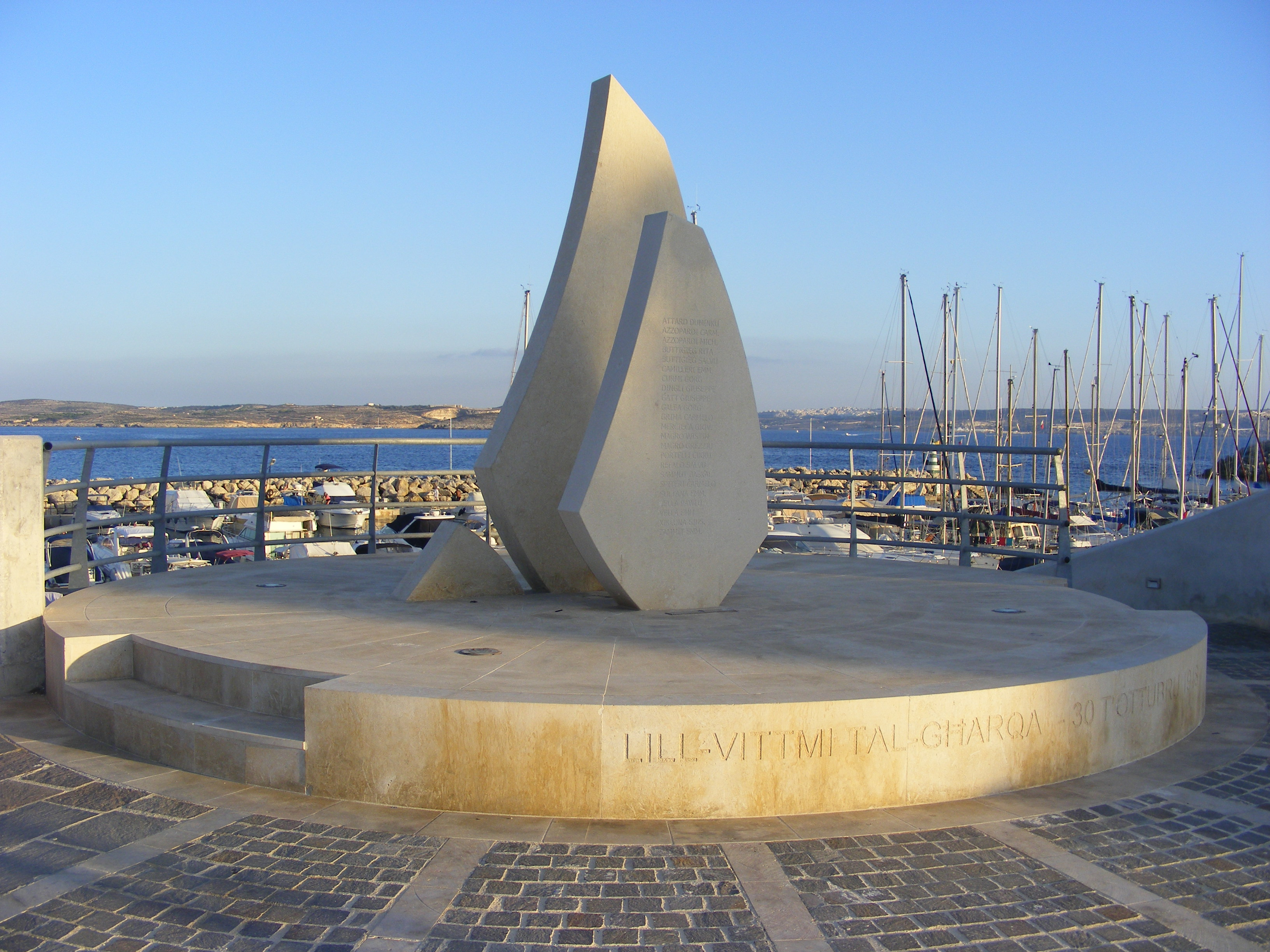
Monument to the victims of the catastrophe

Magistrate Giovanni Gouder conducted an inquiry to determine what caused the accident. Giuseppe Caruana, the technical expert appointed by Gouder, found that the luzzu was capable of carrying up to 13 passengers, meaning that it had been overloaded as it was actually carrying 25 passengers and two crew.

The Prime Minister also set up two committees, one to raise funds for the families of the victims, and another to examine the report of Gouder's inquiry and to make recommendations on what action needs to be taken. The latter was set up after there were anonymous allegations criticizing the police's actions surrounding the accident. On 12 December 1949, this committee stated that Gouder's inquiry was adequate, the police were not at fault, and there was no need for further inquiries.

The committee's recommendations included better enforcement of regulations regarding passenger transport, and that only authorised boats should be allowed to carry passengers. It also stated that no boats should be allowed to carry more passengers than their authorised capacity. One of the committee members, Henry Jones, disagreed with the committee's findings and made a separate report demanding to know why the 16:30 ferry crossing had been cancelled.

=== Memorial and commemorations ===
The shipwreck is Gozo's worst disaster since World War II, and it is also known as Jum it-Traġedja (Day of the Tragedy). A monument commemorating the disaster is located at Żewwieqa in Mġarr harbour. An annual remembrance ceremony is held on the anniversary of the disaster at the memorial and on board Gozo Channel Line ferries.
