= Godfrey Baldacchino =

Maltese and Canadian island studies scholar (born 1960)

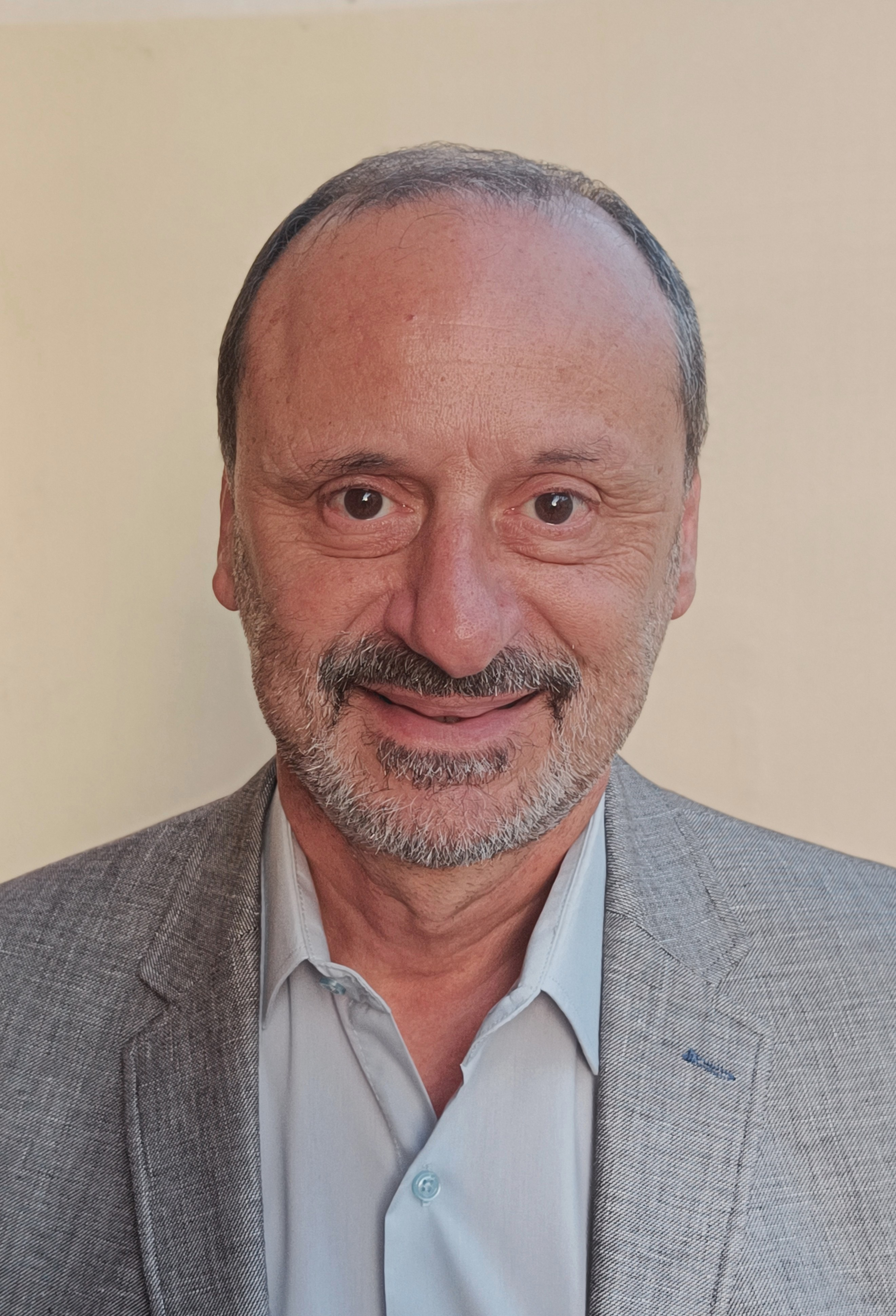
Baldacchino in 2026

Godfrey Baldacchino (born 25 April 1960) is a Maltese and Canadian nissologist and social scientist. Having spent some time studying astronomy, he later fastened onto small states and islands. He has been teaching his whole adult life and presently serves as professor of sociology at the University of Malta, although he also has ties to the University of Prince Edward Island. In 2016, he ran for rector of the University of Malta and lost to Alfred Vella. Afterwards, Vella appointed him pro-rector of International Development for five years.

Baldacchino has written about and held roles pertaining to cooperatives, education, economics, Maltese politics and the Maltese identity, and transport. He supports a national Maltese metro along with a fixed link between Malta and Gozo, and has controversially suggested Malta buy Pantelleria. In 2022, journalist Arturo Chang described Baldacchino as a foremost island studies scholar. He founded two journals: the Island Studies Journal and Small States & Territories.

== Career ==
=== Astronomy ===
For the first years of his adulthood, Baldacchino studied meteors and what they reveal about the Solar System. He wrote in his dissertation that he had liked astronomy since boyhood and had gradually grown interested in its "active propagation" in Malta. With Alexander Gatt, he founded an amateur society for astronomers at the University of Malta, the Students Astronomical Circle, in 1978. The Malta Astronomical Society names him an honorary member, recognized among others for "their contributions and achievements" on the society's behalf.

=== Academia and island studies ===
After focusing on astronomy, Baldacchino's career shifted towards small islands and small states. To him, the change was not total because meteors, like islands, are small things. (Note: He elaborates: "And the interesting thing about astronomy is that you realize that the Earth is actually a very small island, surrounded by billions of stars and planets where human life is not possible. So, the whole Earth is, in a way, an island.") Island studies (or nissology) formally began in the mid-1980s. It is the child of Western thinkers' time-old attachment to islands as sites for their tales and utopias, seeing that one historically had to be resourceful to thrive in such restricted spaces. It mixes hard sciences such as geology together with social sciences like history and politics and is hence considered multidisciplinary. In good part, the subject arose from scholars' work at the University of Malta and the University of Prince Edward Island in Canada. Baldacchino said of its founding in a 2023 interview: "The problem, however, is that many of these [island studies] scholars didn't live on islands. That's what I'm trying to change. Ask the island residents themselves, give them a voice!"

One sober assessment that has overshadowed this entire journey of his life has been grappling with smallness. He quickly understood that small size does not exclude agency or voice.

— The Philosophy Sharing Foundation reflecting in 2024 on Baldacchino's career

In 1992, he attended a conference at Prince Edward Island among a few scholars from islands; this conference, according to journalist Arturo Chang (2022), lent island studies "its first moments in the sun". He deems Baldacchino "one of the leading scholars in island studies". Baldacchino founded two open access journals in 2006 and 2018, respectively: the Island Studies Journal, which studies islands and archipelagos in an interdisciplinary manner, and Small States & Territories, interested in "the study of the nature and workings of [and comparisons between] small sovereign states ... and non-sovereign territories".

Baldacchino entered the teaching profession in 1979 as a secondary school educator. He then took up numerous posts at the University of Malta, many of which involved labour and industrial relations, before becoming a lecturer at the department of sociology in 1995; at present, he works at the department. (Note: His curriculum vitae states that he became a "Full Professor of Sociology" in June 2010.) In 2003, he began his association with the University of Prince Edward Island. Besides holding some organizational roles and others related to sociology, he lectured island studies there from 2003 to 2013. The University of Malta and the University of Prince Edward Island had been collaborating in the subject since the late 1980s. During his time in Canada, he says, he kept contact with the University of Malta. In 2013, he returned to lecturing full-time in Malta while still serving as a teaching fellow at the University of Prince Edward Island, as of 2022.

In 2016, he was appointed, alongside James Randall, the newly established UNESCO Co-Chair in Island Studies and Sustainability at the University of Prince Edward Island, in partnership with the University of Malta. (Note: His association with the Island Studies and Sustainability programme ended in 2020.) The programme aimed at sprouting research efforts on Small Island Developing States and Subnational Island Jurisdictions. Five years later, Baldacchino was made Malta's first "thematic ambassador" for islands and small states with the goal of bolstering small states' interests on an international scale. He juxtaposed this role with his interest in how small island life is maintained and treated geopolitically, such as how this concerns the small island trait of resourcefulness.

=== Work with the Maltese government ===
After receiving a request, Baldacchino published a report in 1988 on how the Malta Dockyard ought to manage its wages. For over two decades, it was run by the workers themselves and mandated high and fixed rates but, in return, suffered great losses. Afterwards, the government assumed control of the Dockyard and then privatized it. Baldacchino has also worked with unions and led the Centre for Labour Studies. He wrote on cooperatives, including coauthoring the 2001 Co-operative Societies Act, which replaces a 1978 law and "seeks to regulate the use of the particular vehicle or medium of the co-operative" and "govern [their] formation ... management and ... closing down"; according to David Fabri, the other coauthor, it allows cooperatives more power over their internal functions. (Note: At that time, Baldacchino was chair of the Malta Board of Cooperatives. He was a member of the board from 1994 to 2003.) In 2025, he cowrote the book Bormla and its Tourism Potential for the Malta Tourism Observatory with Paul R. Micallef and John Vella. It discusses, in the words of a TVM article, "why Bormla deserves to be better known, religion and pilgrimages in the city, its street niches and monuments, its military heritage and other cultural, social, and industrial aspects".

=== University rectorship election ===
The Gateway Building, the main entrance to the University of Malta's Msida campus

In 2016, Baldacchino contested the University of Malta's rectorship against Alfred Vella, a chemistry professor and pro-rector. (Note: However, he refused to see the race as a competition and said the university would "be in good hands" no matter the result.) Around 1 February, he sent a post deliberating whether or not he should run for the role. He argued that the rector could no longer be a towering, omnicompetent figure since the University had grown into "such a complex corporate organisation". Instead, he proposed to make the rector a "University President", who would tackle the University's strategy, and consign his administrative powers to another person in charge. By the middle of February, he had entered the race against Vella, his only competitor. Asked why he did so, he explained: "I don't know. ... It's part of the growing up process; realising your horizons can be extended... As academics we need have to have higher aspirations, just as we strive to get our students to aspire to achieve. ... At least we should try."

In an interview with the Times of Malta published on 14 February, he deemed himself the outsider next to his familiar rival because he had spent much time outside Malta, yet he felt no one was ahead. The dean of every University faculty had given their support to Vella. In the same interview, he disclosed his ambitions and plans for the University should he become rector: make the Msida campus greener and more "liveable", encourage more foreign-born students to study in Malta and, at the same time, ensure the University "becomes more relevant on a local basis", replace end-of-term exams, and build networks with other institutions to reach out to students who, by failure or by choice, do not enter tertiary education, among other things. He pledged to continue Camilleri's work while pushing for change. On 18 March, the University Council cast four votes to Baldacchino and twenty-seven to Vella. (Note: Of the thirty-two council members (even though thirty-one cast a vote in the election), four are members of the University Senate, six are staff representatives, three are student council members, fifteen are members appointed by the Prime Minister to "represent the general interest of the country", and another is a representative appointed by the education minister.) Vella planned to give Baldacchino a role in his board of pro-rectors, and thus, heas made pro-rector for International Development. (Note: In later articles indicated as International Development & Quality Assurance) He served until the end of Vella's first term in 2021.

== Views ==
=== Malta ===
==== Transport and Gozo ====
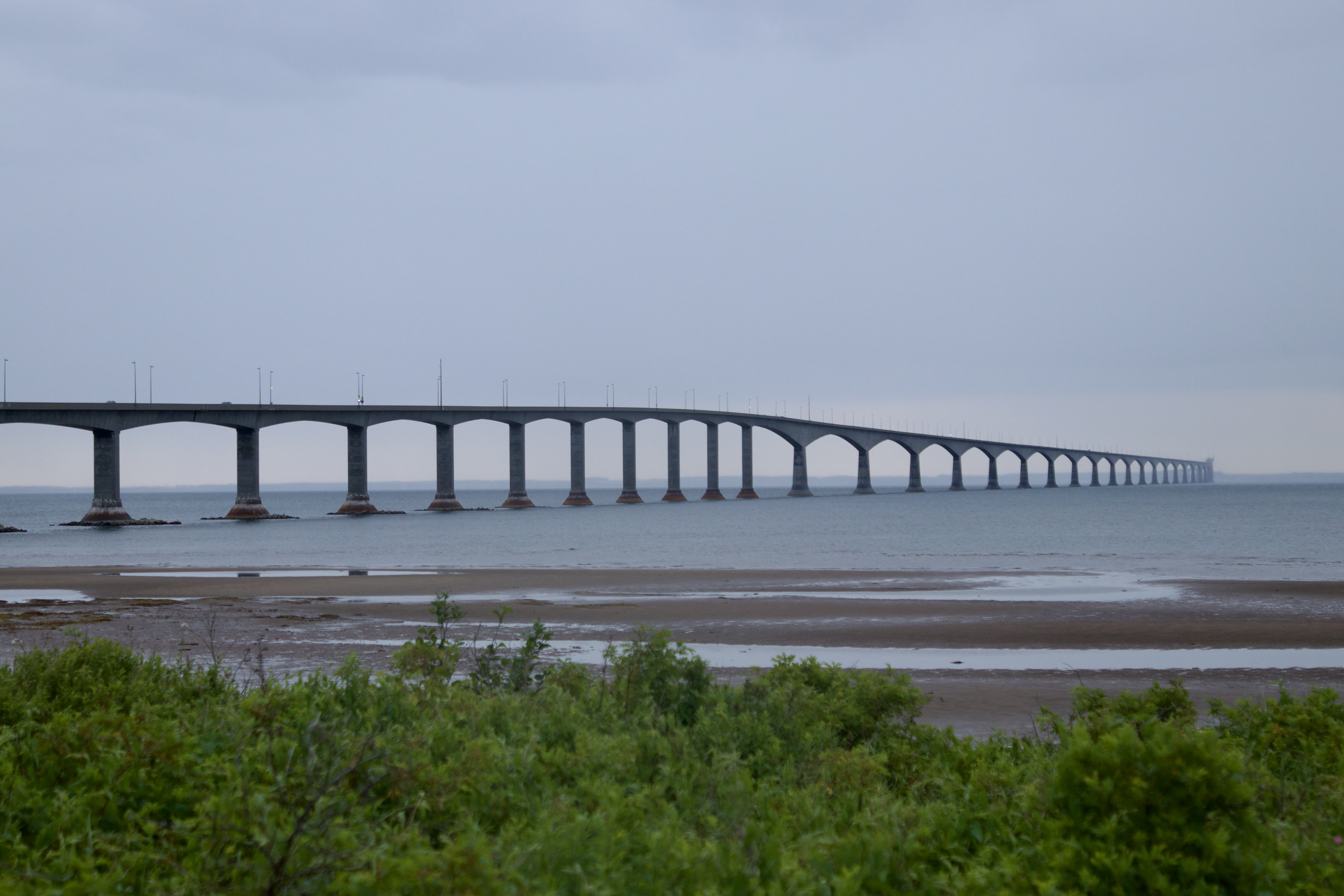
The Confederation Bridge linking Prince Edward Island and mainland Canada. Baldacchino has referred to it as a model for a possible bridge between the two main Maltese isles.

Baldacchino favours a tunnel between Malta and Gozo, Malta's sister island, to be modelled on the link connecting Prince Edward Island and mainland Canada. However, he thinks such a tunnel should be bound to a national metro to make for an alternative to private transport. For the metro, Baldacchino suggests taking inspiration from Mauritius, whose modern history, economic niches, politics, and geography he likens with Malta's. Mauritius' light rail metro, spanning twenty-six kilometres, was built overground in the late 2010s.

At a 2025 conference about the Gozo ferry service, he maintained that a better link with Gozo would earn it a stronger economy and tourism industry and favour those who routinely commute between the sister island and Malta. At the same time, he said in another study, a bridge or tunnel would diminish Gozitan demands for self-rule. The same study concluded that Gozo's poor political representation in Malta, absent regional parties or separatist activity, and economic reliance on the mainland, among other reasons, keep it a long distance away from autonomy. He pointed favourably at Tobago's state of affairs: being part of the Republic of Trinidad and Tobago but with an executive and legislative branch of its own.

==== Politics and national identity ====
I would say that it's already evolving into something else… though it is possibly too early to say what, exactly, it will morph into.

— Baldacchino in 2020 on the two-party system in Malta

In a 2026 column written with Michael Briguglio, Baldacchino identified a consistent gap in Maltese election results that has burdened the Nationalist Party's chances at reaching victory. Since the 1971 election, they suggest, there has been a difference of roughly five points in "core" loyalty between it and the opposing Labour Party. Ergo, the Labour Party has historically had a larger base. As a result, few voters ever sway from Labour to the Nationalists, and these usually return to their "home" party after the election. The authors conclude that only especially fiery matters, similar to the Church's interdiction of Labour (1962/1966) and European Union membership (1998/2003), would stop Labour from triumphing in elections. They attribute this to steadfast support for a party across generations and better adaptation to the electorate's wants.

Six years earlier, Baldacchino published an editorial asserting that Malta's two-party rule was ebbing away. The Nationalist Party had not surpassed forty-five percent of the vote in any local or European Parliament election since March 2013, and a MaltaToday poll held in January 2020 found that nearly five times as many respondents trusted the new Labour Party leader over the Nationalists'; and this came about after Labour Prime Minister Joseph Muscat's resignation and the party's enduring accusations and reports of corruption. Questioned by journalist Raphael Vassallo, Baldacchino noted that the Nationalists under Simon Busuttil (2013–2017) and Adrian Delia (2017–2020) spoke extensively about political reform and yet did not convince people. Some remained awed at politicians who wrestle with institutions trying to enforce the rule of law—"the system". While his editorial said the fall of two-party rule would eventually forge Malta into a one-party democracy, he told Vassallo that the country may follow the likes of Japan and retain one centrist big tent party, shoving all other parties to the side. He argued that under Malta's two-party system, the opposition has no practical power and the prime minister is a "benevolent dictator": "It's an advantage for government, certainly, but it could also translate into an advantage for the country. ... We keep criticising the system... but in reality, it works. It has delivered the resignation of Malta’s strongest Prime Minister to date; as well as the election of a complete outsider ... to replace him."

In a review of Charles Xuereb's work Decolonising the Maltese Mind, Baldacchino argued that the Maltese public has shown a ready devotion to British symbols and interests even after their independence from British imperial rule in 1964. He names as examples the statue of Queen Victoria—who never set foot in Malta—in the capital city and University of Malta's continued use of English for teaching instead of Maltese; in addition to this, the country's governments "have sought to make Malta attractive to foreign investment". To him, the absence of distinctively Maltese symbols suggests a "nationless[ness]", also reflected in the country's having more than one national day. When asked in 2014 about whether Malta should keep just one of its five national holidays, he responded that it will be possible after the generations that had lived through national events such as Malta's independence from the British, its becoming a republic, and the withdrawal of British troops, die. He thinks that one holiday will be Independence Day; "[can] it be any other?".

==== Education ====
A few years after his invitation to the Stipends Review Commission in 2000, he expected grants would stop being issued to all students in part because they were (possibly) no longer driving students to continue their education after secondary school. And students receiving grants had little incentive to find casual or part-time work. Baldacchino wrote that Maltese education institutions "require to ... embrace a much larger flexibility in the way that they offer and run their courses" so that students "follow courses at their own pace and in their own time", even permitting employment.

Reflecting on a 2022 visit to Mauritius, he argued that both Mauritius and Malta must internationalize their universities to make up for their seclusion on the world map. He opposes the process by which University of Malta academics become associate or full professors: as of 2016, applications were sent to and judged by the international Association of Commonwealth Universities, which then returns its recommendations to Malta. Baldacchino called it "embarrassing" and "neo-colonial", and when running for rector, he campaigned for slowly replacing this process with a local one.

==== Environment ====
Baldacchino wrote and spoke against Sport Malta's 2021 plans to build a freshwater waterpolo pitch in Marsaskala Bay. As he noted, this would take up over two thousand square metres of seabed and obstruct much of residents' access to the bay, thus worsening the harm already done by the rise of pleasure crafts and vessels parked there.

He disagrees with how many international institutions and experts present Small Island Developing States' struggles against global warming. In his opinion, they advise residents of these states to remain resilient, in effect fostering "a condition of insecurity and threat" rather than "a different, more emancipatory kind of collective agency". They label residents as victims but not "environmental refugees" so that other countries may thwart their responsibility to help. Moreover, he adds, these institutions prioritize the future effects of global warming while small island developing states find themselves "burdened with securing their present".

==== Pantelleria purchase ====
Malta's and Pantelleria's positions in the Mediterranean Sea

Baldacchino suggested in 2018 that Malta buy Pantelleria, an Italian island of eighty-three square kilometres (thirty-two square miles) then housing seven thousand residents. The way he saw it, this would solve Malta's overcrowding and temper pressure from mass immigration while returning jobs to Pantelleria. Since both islands have semitic elements in their languages and a similar colonial past, he thought the purchase would also revive the bonds between them. Pantelleria's mayor responded with a call for commercial partnership, but Maltese citizens and academics on social media largely scoffed at Baldacchino's idea; by 2019, a Times of Malta column had labelled it "infamous". Opponents feared Malta's dense urban environment would spill over to and defile Pantelleria and that Malta would attract more immigrants, as the Italian island is closer to Africa. Nonetheless, Baldacchino stood by his suggestion. A later study with fifty Pantescans found "they would never risk their island home to be destroyed as happened in Malta". (Note: The study's findings continue thus: "They prefer to stay as they are in their natural paradise, earning the minimum and having a decent life in touch with nature rather than being financially stable but living in a tight-packed polluted environment such as that in Malta.")

==== COVID-19 pandemic ====
Early into the COVID-19 pandemic, Baldacchino proposed some temporary local measures to deal with the struggling economy, including slashing wages by twenty percent, save for those working in health and other essential sectors, transitioning to a three-day work week, offering early retirement to workers aged fifty-nine and over, and forbidding redundancies.

=== Foreign affairs ===
In 2016, against the background of the Brexit debate, rifts over immigration, and other problems, Baldacchino argued that an identity crisis had befallen Europe. A European Union focusing on drafting and improving laws on which member states would cooperate, a longstanding status quo towards a "greater and closer union", could not hold anymore, he thought. For example, Europe had long embraced immigration, but recent times had steered attitudes towards border control. He added that Europeans did not much care about the Union because it had distanced itself greatly from people's everyday lives, and so it could not achieve democratization.

Baldacchino explained the 2022 invasion of Ukraine as Russia's attempt to preserve a buffer with NATO so that Ukraine would be demilitarized and remain under a government friendly to itself, while maintaining the invasion could not be justified: "It is a show of force against ... Ukraine, with a superpower that’s feeling smitten and outraged by [NATO's enlargement, above all]". The invasion, in his view, could progress like Russia's war against Georgia fourteen years prior. Regarding the invasion's global effects, he said the world's view of Russia would change in light of its attacks on a sovereign state. As for a geopolitical status quo, "we might be going back to a pre-1991 scenario".

=== Island studies ===
The beauty of islands is that they are manageable communities, each charting its own course and finding its own answers. Just like Robinson Crusoe, but in reality.

— Baldacchino in a 2023 interview

Asked about "what makes islands special", the first trait he mentioned was openness, elaborating: "[The] smaller the island, the more inventive you must be. Besides, on an island, you can't get far on your own; you're inherently international. You have to be open to people, trade and ideas. ... [You] always need a port." He named innovation, thriftiness with few resources, residents' dependence on one another, and an entrepreneurial spirit, as well. Baldacchino warns against seeing islands idealistically; he brings up the example of Haiti, whose status as a failed state, he thinks, arises from the elite owning all the country's land. On the other hand, he laments a tendency among small state analysts to neglect the economic successes of nations such as Ireland and Iceland and herald them as models to be followed. Baldacchino also doubts the idea of islanders as distinct from all groups of people by virtue of their being split from the rest of the world. To understand islands, he asserts that one must combine knowledge from multiple subjects and not rest on just one discipline: "In general: the knowledge of islanders is broader but less deep. Island residents are closer to the Renaissance ideal. For me, that makes science more enjoyable and exciting."

== Personal life ==
Born on 25 April 1960, Baldacchino has lived in the southern Maltese town of Marsaskala since 1985. He married Anna (née Schembri) that same year and begot two sons with her. He attained dual Canadian citizenship in 2010. In his 1981 dissertation, he stated that astronomy "is a serious hobby of mine", and a Times of Malta article published thirty-five years after reaffirmed this. He enjoys walking and insists on not owning a car. As of 2016, Baldacchino was one of three men at the Marsaskala parish choir.

== Selected works ==
According to his University of Malta profile, Baldacchino has written or edited fifty books, reports, and monographs and penned 160 peer-reviewed journal articles and chapters.

=== Books ===
- Baldacchino, Godfrey (1984). Il-Partecipazzjoni fit-Tarzna: Kif Jaħsibha l-Ħaddiem [Worker Participation at Malta Drydocks: Surveying Worker Perceptions] (in Maltese). Malta: University of Malta.
- Baldacchino, Godfrey (1990). Worker Co-operatives with Particular Reference to Malta: An Educationist's Theory and Practice. The Netherlands: Institute of Social Studies. ISBN 90-6490-033-7.
- Baldacchino, Godfrey (1997). Global Tourism and Informal Labour Relations: The Small Scale Syndrome at Work. London, England: Mansell. ISBN 0-7201-2248-1.
- Baldacchino, Godfrey (2010). Island Enclaves: Offshoring Strategies, Creative Governance, and Subnational Island Jurisdictions. Montreal, Quebec: McGill-Queen's University Press. ISBN 978-0-7735-3743-9.
- Baldacchino, Godfrey (2011). Introducing Social Studies: A Maltese Reader (3 ed.). Malta: Miller Distributors. ISBN 978-9932-8681-3-1.
- Baldacchino, Godfrey (2011). Ninvestigaw is-Soċjetà [Investigating Society] (in Maltese) (3 ed.). Malta: Miller Distributors. ISBN 978-99932-86-82-0.
- Baldacchino, Godfrey; Fleury, Christian; Grydehøj, Adam; Gupta, Pamila; Hillebrink, Steven; Iwashita, Akihiro; Johnson, Henry; Katayanagi, Mari; Lindstrom, Bjarne; Jiangyong, Liu; McIntyre, David; Naucler, Elisabeth; van Aert, Peter; van Dijk, Jouke (2017). Solution Protocols to Festering Island Disputes: 'Win-Win' Solutions for the Diaoyu/Senkaku Islands. New York City, New York: Routledge. ISBN 978-1-4724-7518-3.
- Baldacchino, Godfrey; Micallef, Paul R.; Vella, John (May 2025). Bormla and Its Tourism Potential. Malta: Malta Tourism Observatory. ISBN 978-9918-0-1184-1.

=== Books edited ===
- Baldacchino, Godfrey; Rizzo, Saviour; Zammit, Edward L., eds. (1994). Cooperative Ways of Working: Towards a Mediterranean Research Project. Msida, Malta: Workers' Participation Development Centre.
- Sultana, Richard G.; Baldacchino, Godfrey, eds. (1994). Maltese Society: A Sociological Inquiry. Msida, Malta: Mireva Publications. ISBN 1-870579-24-0.
- Symeonides, Klitos; Baldacchino, Godfrey, eds. (1996). Cyprus–Malta on the Threshold of Accession to the European Union. Challenges to Workers and Trade Unions: Positions of the Main Trade Unions and Reports from Two Seminars. Nicosia, Cyprus: Ministry of Education. ISBN 9963-0-4245-7.
- Baldacchino, Godfrey; Mayo, Peter, eds. (1997). Beyond Schooling: Adult Education in Malta. Msida, Malta: Mireva Publications. ISBN 1-870579-55-0.
- Baldacchino, Godfrey; Greenwood, Robert, eds. (1998). Competing Strategies of Socio-Economic Development for Small Islands. Charlottetown, Prince Edward Island: Island Studies Press. ISBN 0-919013-23-6.
- Baldacchino, Godfrey; Milne, David, eds. (2000). Lessons from the Political Economy of Small Islands: The Resourcefulness of Jurisdiction. Basingstoke, England & New York City, New York: Palgrave Macmillan & St. Martin's Press, Inc. doi:10.1007/978-1-349-62865-0. ISBN 0-333-77817-0.
- Baldacchino, Godfrey; Farrugia, Charles J., eds. (2002). Educational Management and Planning in Small States: Concepts and Experiences. London: Commonwealth Secretariat. ISBN 0-85092-729-3.
- Baldacchino, Godfrey; Caruana, Antoinette; Grixti, Mario, eds. (2003). Managing People in Malta: Case Studies in Local Human Resource Management Practice. Malta: Agenda, with the Foundation for Human Resources Development. ISBN 99932-622-5-0.
- Baldacchino, Godfrey, ed. (2006). Extreme Tourism: Lessons from the World's Cold Water Islands. Amsterdam, The Netherlands: Elsevier. ISBN 0-08-044656-6.
- Baldacchino, Godfrey, ed. (2007). Bridging Islands: The Impact of 'Fixed Links'. Malta & Canada: Agenda Academic & Institute of Island Studies. ISBN 978-1-894838-24-5.
- Baldacchino, Godfrey, ed. (2007). A World of Islands: An Island Studies Reader. Charlottetown, Prince Edward Island: Acorn Press. ISBN 978-99932-86-10-3.
- Baldacchino, Godfrey; Stewart, Kathleen, eds. (2008). Pulling Strings: Policy Insights for Prince Edward Island from other Sub-National Island Jurisdictions. Charlottetown, Prince Edward Island: Island Studies Press. ISBN 978-0-919013-54-4.
- Baldacchino, Godfrey; Milne, David, eds. (2009). The Case for Non-Sovereignty: Lessons from Sub-National Island Jurisdictions. London, England: Routledge. ISBN 978-0-415-86478-7.
- Baldacchino, Godfrey; Greenwood, Rob; Felt, Lawrence, eds. (2009). Remote Control: Governance Lessons for and from Small, Insular, and Remote Regions. St. John's, Newfoundland and Labrador: ISER Books. ISBN 978-1-894725-08-8.
- Baldacchino, Godfrey; Niles, Daniel, eds. (2011). Island Futures: Conservation and Development Across the Asia-Pacific Region. Tokyo, Japan: Springer. ISBN 978-4-431-53988-9.
- Baldacchino, Godfrey, ed. (2011). Island Songs: A Global Repertoire. New York City, New York: The Scarecrow Press, Inc. ISBN 978-0-8108-8177-8.
- Baldacchino, Godfrey, ed. (2012). Extreme Heritage Management: The Practices and Policies of Densely Populated Islands. Vol. 6. Lanham, Maryland: Berghahn Books. doi:10.2307/j.ctt9qcjz7. ISBN 978-085745259-7. JSTOR j.ctt9qcjz7.
- Baldacchino, Anna; Baldacchino, Godfrey, eds. (2012). A Taste of Islands: 60 Recipes and Stories from Our World of Islands. Charlottetown, Prince Edward Island: Island Studies Press. ISBN 978-0-919013-74-2.
- Hepburn, Eve; Baldacchino, Godfrey, eds. (2013). Independence Movements in Subnational Island Jurisdictions. London, England: Routledge. ISBN 978-041550585-7.
- Baldacchino, Godfrey, ed. (2013). The Political Economy of Divided Islands: Unified Geographies, Multiple Polities. New York City, New York: Palgrave Macmillan. ISBN 978-1-137-02312-4.
- Baldacchino, Godfrey, ed. (2015). Archipelago Tourism: Policies and Practices. Farnham, England: Ashgate. ISBN 978-1-4724-2430-3.
- Vodden, Kelly; Baldacchino, Godfrey; Gibson, Ryan, eds. (2015). Place Peripheral: Place-Based Development in Rural, Island, and Remote Regions. St. John's, Newfoundland and Labrador: ISER Press. ISBN 978-1-894725-25-5.
- Baldacchino, Godfrey, ed. (2018). The Routledge International Handbook of Island Studies. Oxford, England & New York City, New York: Routledge. ISBN 978-1-4724-8338-6.
- Baldacchino, Godfrey; Wivel, Anders, eds. (2020). Handbook on the Politics of Small States. Cheltenham, England: Edward Elgar Publishing. ISBN 978-1-78811-292-5.
- Stratford, Elaine; Baldacchino, Godfrey; McMahon, Elizabeth, eds. (2023). Rethinking Island Methodologies. London, England: Bloomsbury Publishing. ISBN 9781538165201.
- Baldacchino, Godfrey, ed. (2023). The Success of Small States in International Relations Mice that Roar?. Oxford, England & New York City, New York: Routledge. ISBN 978-1-032-32378-7.
