= Malta–Gozo Channel Important Bird Area =

Conservation area in Malta

Coordinates: 36°01′N 14°21′E

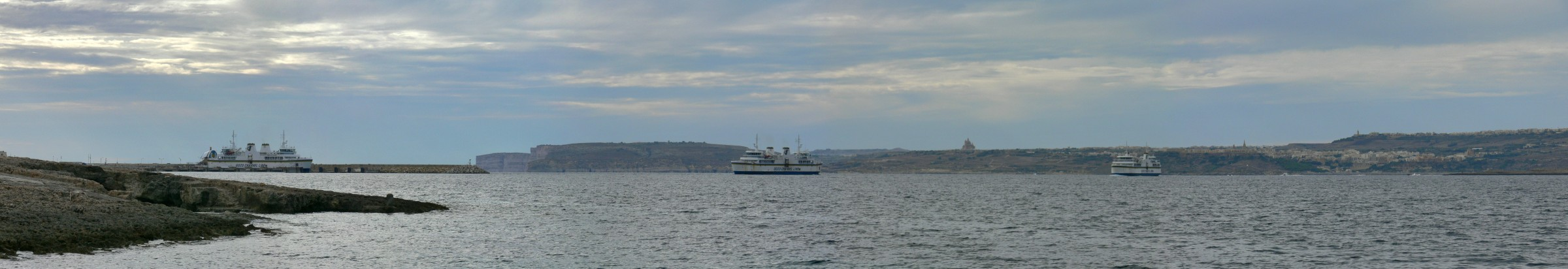
Malta-Gozo Channel

The Malta–Gozo Channel Important Bird Area lies in the Maltese archipelago of the Mediterranean Sea. It encompasses some 123 km^{2} of the Gozo Channel, between the islands of Malta and Gozo, as well as the waters up to 7 km offshore from Rdum Tal-Madonna in Malta to the east and immediately offshore from Ta' Ċenċ Cliffs in Gozo to the west. It was identified as an Important Bird Area (IBA) by BirdLife International because it supports about 1300 breeding pairs of Cory's shearwaters and 600–1000 pairs of yelkouan shearwaters, as well as up to 1000 ferruginous ducks on passage during the migration season.

== See also ==
- List of birds of Malta
