= Laurie Brinklow =

Canadian academic and poet

Laurie Brinklow is a Canadian academic, poet, and author. She is an assistant professor of Island Studies at the University of Prince Edward Island. She is the president of the International Small Islands Studies Association. She is the Co-ordinator of the Institute of Island Studies at the University of Prince Edward Island.

== Early life and education ==
Brinklow has a Bachelor of Arts from University of Victoria. She has a bachelor of education equivalent from University of British Columbia.

Brinklow graduated from the Master of Arts in Island Studies at the University of Prince Edward Island in 2007. She completed her PhD at the University of Tasmania in Geography and Environmental Studies.

== Career ==
From 1990 to 2004, Brinklow was the Publishing Coordinator at the Institute of Island Studies at the University of Prince Edward Island. In 1993, she founded Acorn Press. From 1994 to 1998, she coordinated the North Atlantic Islands Programme (later became the North Atlantic Forum).

Brinklow sold her publishing company, Acorn Press, in 2010 to pursue her PhD at the University of Tasmania. Her book of poetry, Here for the Music, was published in 2012.

In 2015, Laurie was the chair of the Building Community Resilience Conference for the 10th North Atlantic Forum in Summerside, Prince Edward Island. She was in the steering committee of Building Small Island Resilience to Global Climate Change in 2016. She recorded a song for a charity album, 12 Songs of Christmas, which raised CAD$8,000 for the local foodbank. She received the Hessian Merit Award for Excellence in Teaching by a Sessional Instructor in 2018. She spoke on Selling Cold Islands module at the University of the Highlands and Islands for the Island Studies program in 2018. She received CAD$5,000 in funding from the Prince Edward Island provincial government to conduct a survey on the reasons islanders where leaving the province as part of the government strategy to increase the population of the island.

Brinklow is the president of the International Small Islands Studies Association. She is the honorary counsel of Iceland in Prince Edward Island. In 2022, she won the Prince Edward Island Book Award for Poetry for My island’s the house I sleep in at night. She and Dr. Carla DiGiorgio won the SSHRC Exchange Publication Awards. She is a board member of the Canadian Rural Revitalization Foundation. She is an editor for Nimbus Publishing. She is a member of the social committee of the UPEI faculty association.

== Bibliography ==
- Prince Edward Island : A Colour Guidebook (editor; author Keith Vaughan)
- The Circumscribed Geography of Home: "Island Identity in the Fiction of Alistair MacLeod and Wayne (2007)
- Message in a Bottle: The Literature of Small Islands (edited with Frank Ledwell and Jane Ledwell)
- Here for the Music (2012)
- From Black Horses to White Steeds Building Community Resilience (editor, 2017)
- Prince Edward Island : A Colour Guidebook
- The Bridge Effect (edited with Andrew Jennings)
- My island’s the house I sleep in at night (2021)
