= James Randall (academic) =

Canadian geographer

James Edward Randall was educated as a Canadian geographer and is currently Professor Emeritus at the University of Prince Edward Island and scholar of Island Studies. He was the chair of the Institute of Island Studies. Randall was the UNESCO Chair in Island Studies and Sustainability at the Institute of Island Studies of the University of Prince Edward Island.

== Early life and education ==
Randall has a BA and MA from York University. He completed his PhD from the University of Washington.

== Career ==
In July 2016, Randall and Godfrey Baldacchino were appointed co-chairs of the newly created Institute of Island Studies at the University of Prince Edward Island in partnership with the University of Malta. They were also cochairs of the UNESCO Chair in Island Studies and Sustainability. He was the chair of the Island Studies program at the University of Prince Edward Island.

In March 2019, Randall organized the International Conference on Small Island States and Subnational Island Jurisdictions with the University of Aruba in Oranjestad.

Randall wrote a chapter for The Challenges of Island Studies book by Ayano Ginoza and published by Springer.

Randall was appointed Professor Emeritus at the University of Prince Edward Island in July 2021 after his retirement from the university.

== Bibliography ==
- An Introduction to Island Studies
