= Gozo University Group =

Student organization based in Gozo, Malta

- Formation: 1987
- Founded at: Gozo
- Purpose: Highlight the needs and problems of Gozitan youths and students
- President: Matthew Grech
- Website: http://gug.org.mt/

Gozo University Group, or simply GUG, is a student organization based in Gozo, the sister island of Malta.

== History ==
GUG originated in the 1980s and was officially recognized in 1987 as a student organization by the Senate of the University of Malta. GUG is known for representing the needs and problems of Gozitan youths and students on campus, mainly in the University of Malta, where there are over 900 Gozitan students (10% of all the university students).

== Activism ==
In September 2016, GUG met with Alfred Sant, former Prime Minister of Malta and current MEP and the Gozo Youth Council who expressed their concerns on the depopulation of Gozo, point out at the lack of employment opportunities in Gozo.

In early November 2016, GUG called for a revival of the Gozo University Campus in Xewkija, stating that the development of the campus is always put aside.

On 23 September 2017, GUG said that Gozitan students were being priced out of the rental market and forced to cross over to Malta every day. GUG also added that it had been contacted by numerous students in 2017 who reported having to make the channel crossing on a daily basis because they could not find affordable accommodation in Malta.

In February 2018, GUG has stated, "the Gozo Channel said that they are looking for a company which would give the Maltese population the opportunity to travel through the use of a fast ferry service." The GUG was pleased to see that this service was being worked on. GUG also added, "It is a project which the Organisation has been in favour of for a long time. Despite these promising steps, there is still work to be done to make the service better for Gozitan students."

On 14 April 2018, GUG has complained about public transport issues for Gozitan students, having stated that the complaints brought on by GUG to the Minister for Transport five months earlier in November 2017 "have fallen on deaf ears".

== Affiliations ==
GUG is affiliated with various committees and organizations including the Regional Projects Committee part of Ministry for Gozo, Commission for Social Policy (KPS), Youth Council of Malta (KNŻ), Aġenzija Żgħażagħ, and the Gozo NGO Association.
