= Rdum Tal-Madonna Important Bird Area =

Conservation area in Malta

Coordinates: 35°59′N 14°22′E

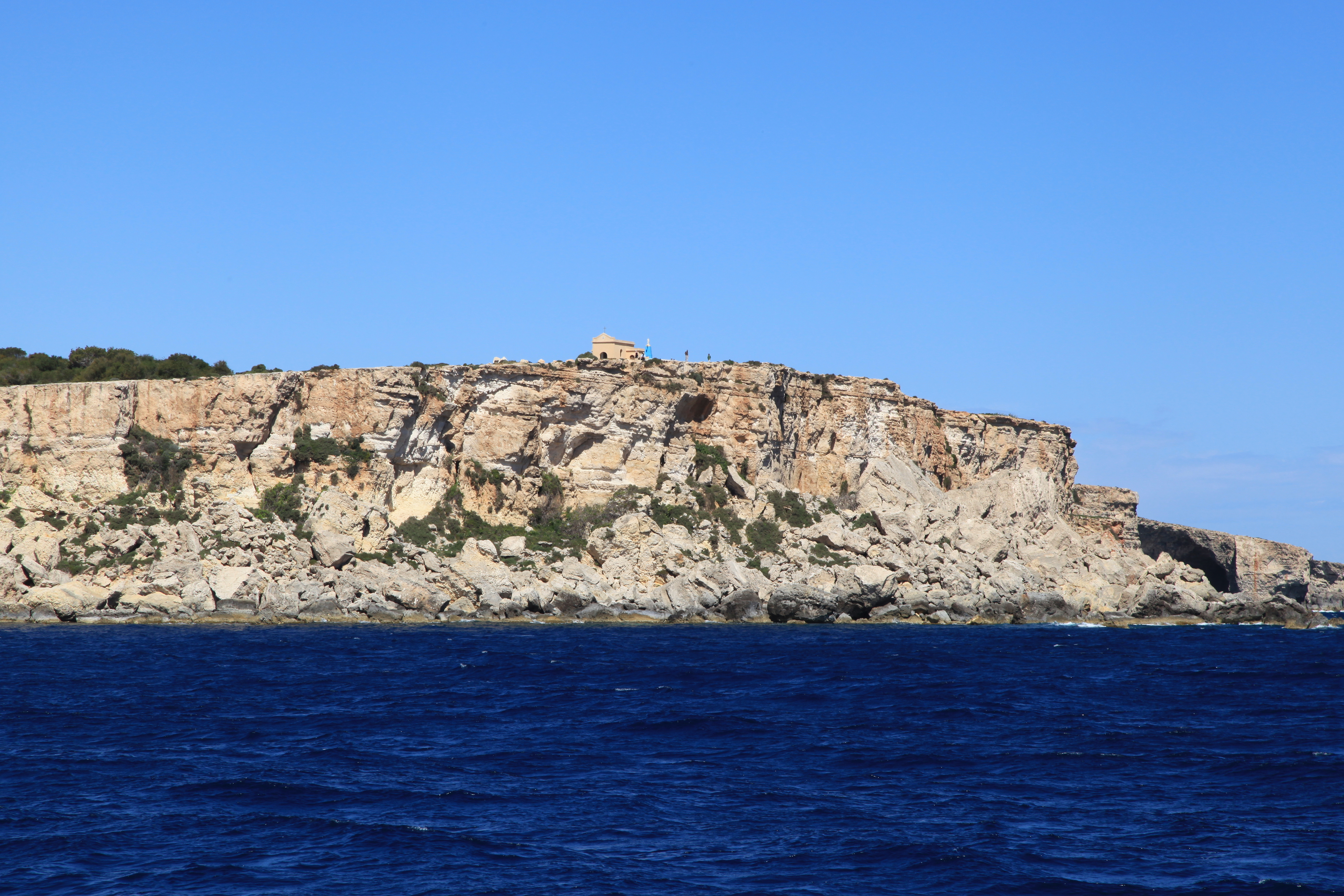
Rdum tal-Madonna

The Rdum tal-Madonna Important Bird Area comprises a 4 ha linear strip of cliffed coastline about 200 m long near L-AħraxMellieħa, Malta. Its rugged cliffs rise from sea level, where there is much rock debris, to a height of 25 m. It was identified as an Important Bird Area (IBA) by BirdLife International because it supports 500 breeding pairs of yelkouan shearwaters.

== See also ==
- List of birds of Malta
