= Gozo Channel =

Channel between the islands Gozo and Malta

- Il-Fliegu t’Għawdex
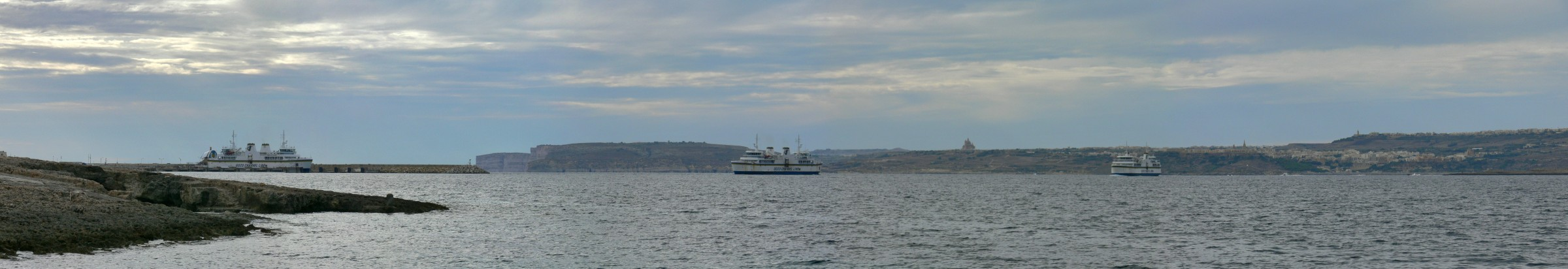
- The Gozo Channel

- Location of the Gozo Channel in Malta
- Location: Between Gozo and Malta (island)
- Group: Mediterranean Sea
- Coordinates: 36.00°N 14.31°E
- Type: Saline
- Max. length: 5.5 km (3.4 mi)
- Max. width: 6.7 km (4.2 mi)
- Surface area: 27.4 km^{2} (10.6 mi^{2})
- Max. depth: 26 m (85 ft)
- Islands: 4

The Gozo Channel is a short stretch of Mediterranean Sea separating the Maltese island of Gozo from the northern tip of Malta.

It is about 7 km (4.3 mi) long and varies in width from 6.7 km (4.2 mi) at its widest to 4.5 km (2.8 mi) at its northeastern end. At the centre of the channel are the two islands of Comino (inhabited) and Cominotto. The channel serves as a sea route link between the two islands with a ferry service run by Gozo Channel Line running all year round from the ports of Mġarr Harbour and Ċirkewwa.
