= Island studies =

Interdisciplinary field of study

Island studies, also known as nissology, is an interdisciplinary academic field devoted to analyzing islands. Island studies examines the relationship between islands and islanders.

== History ==
The International Small Island Studies Association hosted the first Island Studies Conference in 1986 at Vancouver Island. Small Islands Information Network became one of the first places for researchers of island studies to connect. Nissologists examine the relationship between islands and geographic isolation and climate change. In the mid-1980s, island studies started developing as an independent academic field. In 1992, nissologists met at the University of Prince Edward Island at the newly established Institute of Island Studies to discuss islands. Island studies includes sociology, geology, history, political science, and philosophy. This subject looks at the diversity and dynamic nature of islands and islanders.

== Programs ==
- Master of Arts in Island Studies is offered at the University of Prince Edward Island in Canada. The program has three streams, International Relations (Island Studies) and Island Public Policy, Island Tourism, and Sustainable Island Communities. Island Studies is also a minor at the University of Prince Edward Island.
- Master of Literature in Island Studies is a program at the University of the Highlands and Islands. The program is managed by the Institute for Northern Studies at the university.

== Institutions ==
- The Institute of Island Studies and the Island Studies Press located at the University of Prince Edward Island. Dr. Laurie Brinklow is the chair of the Institute of Island Studies.
- UNESCO Chair in Island Studies and Sustainability is located at the University of Prince Edward Island. It is a partnership between the University of Prince Edward Island, the University of Malta, and UNESCO. Dr. Jean Mitchell is the current chair of the UNESCO Chair in Island Studies and Sustainability. The chair was launched in 2016 with Dr. James Randall, and Dr. Godfrey Baldacchino as co-chairs.
- Center for Pacific Islands Studies at the University of Hawaiʻi is a center for island studies with a specialization in Pacific Islands. It publishes a journal called The Contemporary Pacific.
- Island Institute was established in 1983 by Peter Ralston and Philip Conkling in Maine to study the islands in the state.
- The International Scientific Council for Island Development was established in 1989 with support from UNESCO. It is based and registered in France.
- The OPRI Centre for Island Studies is managed by the Ocean Policy Research Institute in Japan.
- The Scottish Centre for Island Studies based in the University of the West of Scotland.

== Journals ==
- The Island Studies Press has been publishing the Island Studies Journal since 2006.
- Shima is a journal published by the Southern Cross University. It was established by Phil Hayward.
- International Journal of Island Affairs was a journal that was published from 1992 to 2012 by the International Scientific Council for Island Development.
- World Environment and Island Studies is a journal published by the World Association for Island Studies and World Environment and Island Institute, Jeju National University in South Korea.

== Conferences ==
- The International Small Island Studies Association holds conferences on topics related to Island Studies around the world.
- Small Island Cultures Research Initiative was established in 2004 to develop research ties between researchers working on small island based communities. It was founded by Danny Long and Philip Hayward.
