= Tourism in Malta =

Important sector of the country's economy

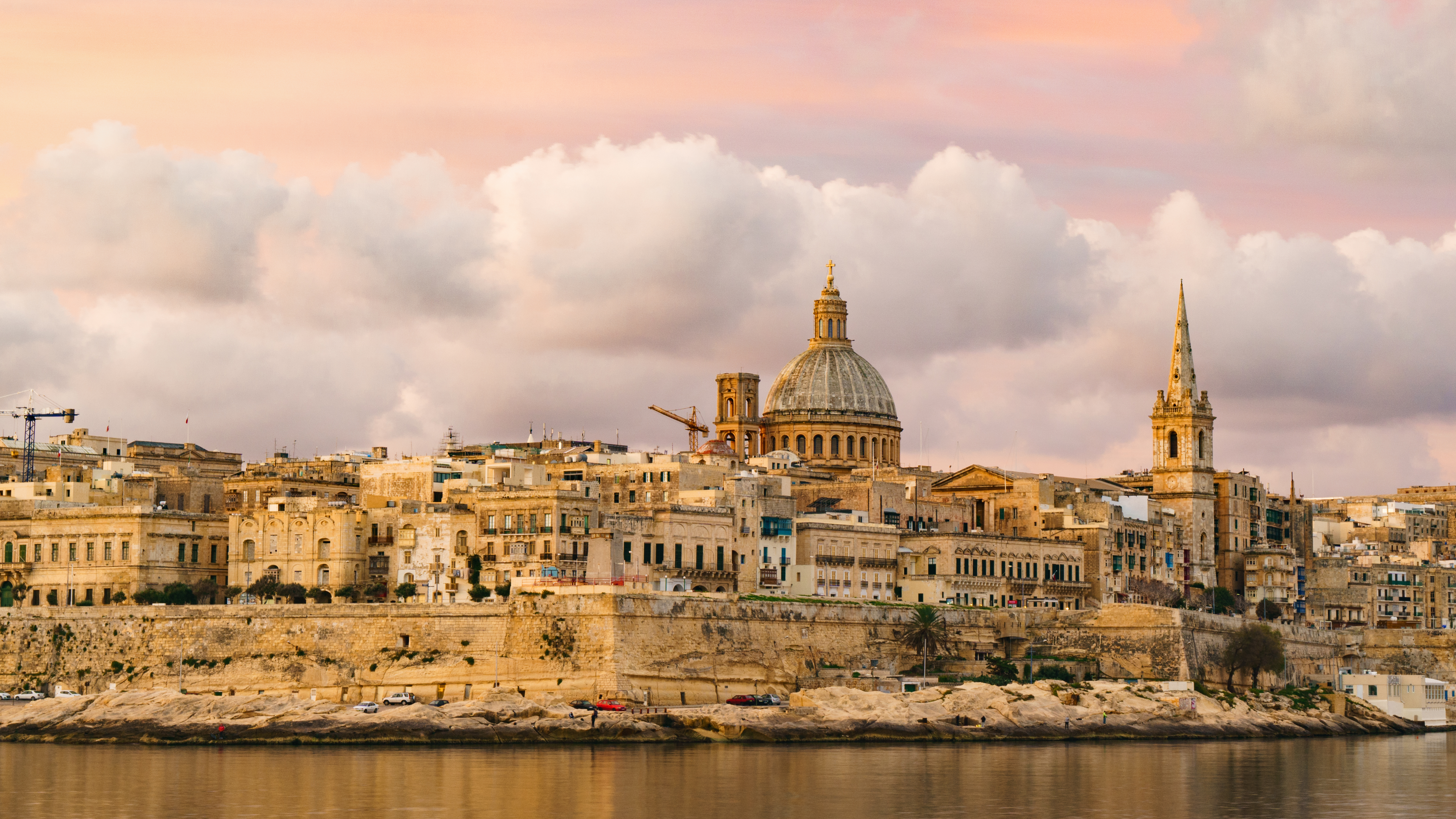
Valletta, Malta's historical capital city

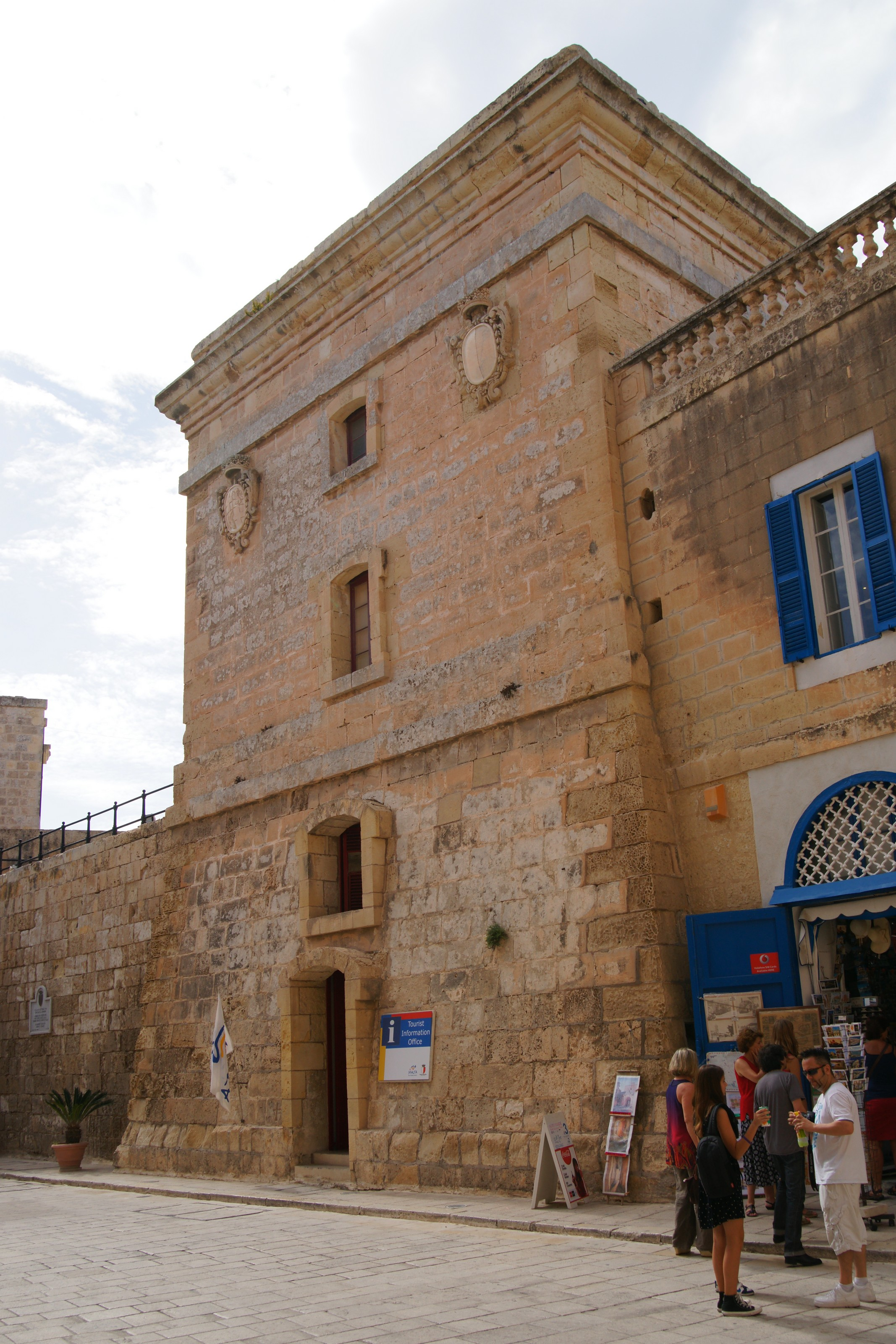
Tourist information centre at the Torre dello Standardo in Mdina

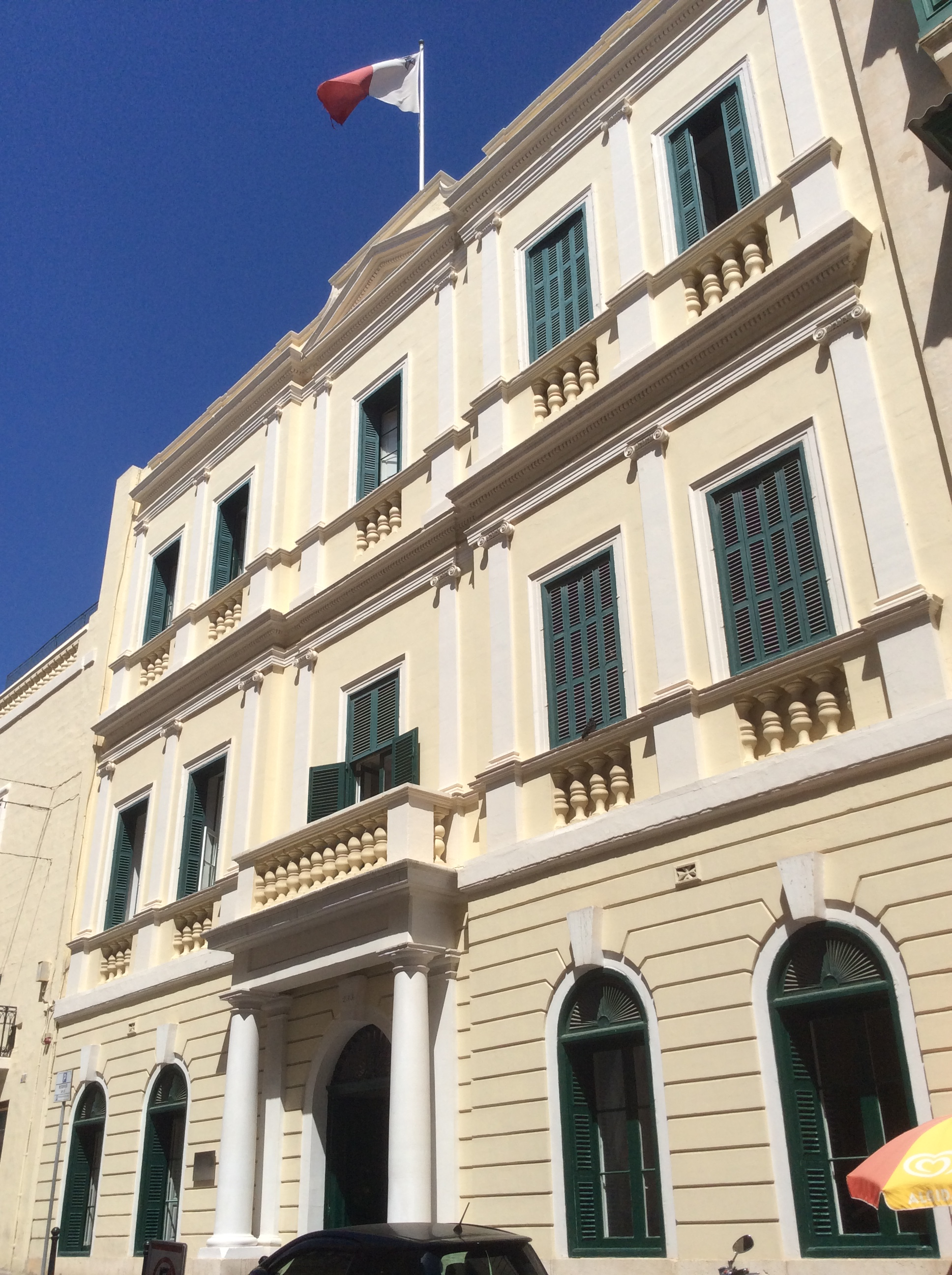
Ministry for Tourism building in Valletta

Tourism in Malta is an important sector of the country's economy, contributing to about 6.1 percent of the nation's gross domestic product (GDP). It is overseen by the Malta Tourism Authority, in turn falls under the responsibility of the Minister for Tourism, the Environment and Culture. Malta features a number of tourism attractions encompassing elements of the island's rich history and culture, as well as aquatic activities associated with the Mediterranean Sea. In addition, medical tourism has become popular in Malta in recent years, especially since government efforts to market the practice to medical tourists in the United Kingdom.

The number of people who visited Malta in 2009 dropped considerably compared to the figures for 2008 - overall, the country's tourism industry suffered an 8 percent drop from 2008. Visits from non-European Union countries dropped more considerably than visits from European Union countries (and even more so than visits from Eurozone countries), while the average stay length remained the same for both 2008 and 2009. Visitors from most countries require a visa to visit Malta. The nationalities requiring a visa are standardised as per European Union rules. Visitors already holding a valid Schengen Area visa most likely will not need to complete any more formalities to enter Malta, so long as they are already inside the Schengen Area. Visitors holding citizenship of the European Union do not require a visa to enter Malta as they hold the right to free movement within the European Union. In recent years, the country's tourism industry has been faced with a number of issues relating to the nation's small size, both in terms of area and population. These issues include stretched resources and infrastructure (such as water, waste management, beaches, and roads), especially during the summer months of June, July, and August.

== Attractions ==
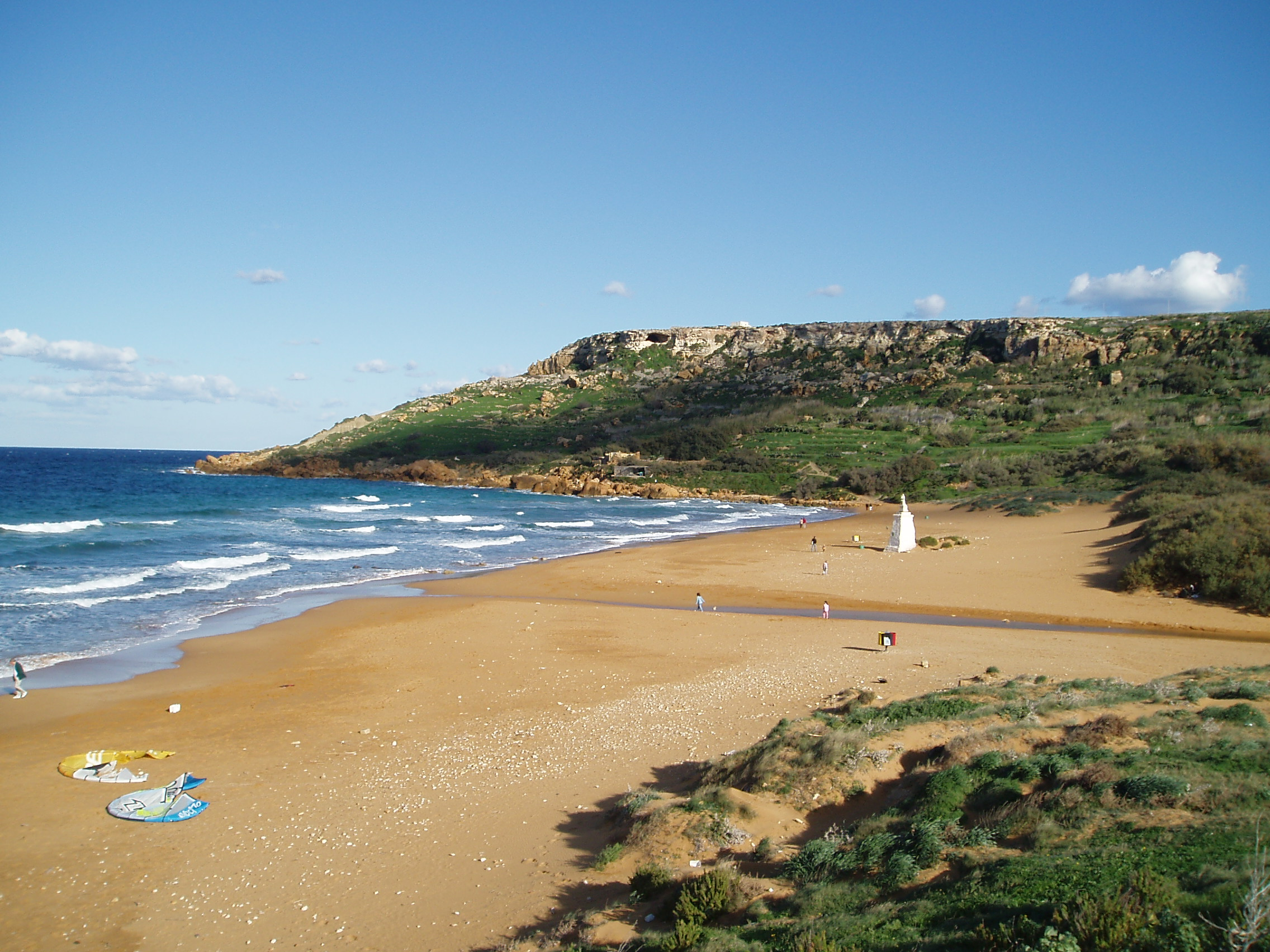
The beach of Ramla Bay on Gozo.

Malta has a long and rich history, and this is reflected in the island's cultural attractions. The Phoenicians, the Carthaginians, the Romans, and the Byzantines have all occupied Malta at some point in history, leaving a mix of many different architectural styles and artifacts to explore. The sovereignty of the Knights Hospitaller over Malta from 1530 to 1798 resulted in a legacy of elaborate artistry and architecture throughout Malta. The country's modern museums and art galleries feature relics from Malta's history for tourists and Maltese residents alike to enjoy.

There are also a number of aquatic activities to enjoy on Malta as well as Gozo and Comino. Northern Malta is home to the country's beach resorts and holiday areas, with the beaches most popular with holiday-makers being Mellieha Bay, Ghajn Tuffieha, and Golden Bay. These beaches are large enough to be able to house cafes, restaurants, and kiosks, but small enough to rarely be crowded. Malta's northwest is home to the island's quietest beaches, and it is on these that the main island's neighbouring two are nearest. Gozo and Comino are also popular beach spots for holiday-makers, although these are much more likely to be quieter, rockier and more suitable for snorkelling. The Mediterranean Sea surrounding Malta is popular for diving - while shallow dips may be attractive to beginning divers, more experienced divers may be able to dive deeper to find historical artifacts from World War II or earlier.

== Major event tourism ==
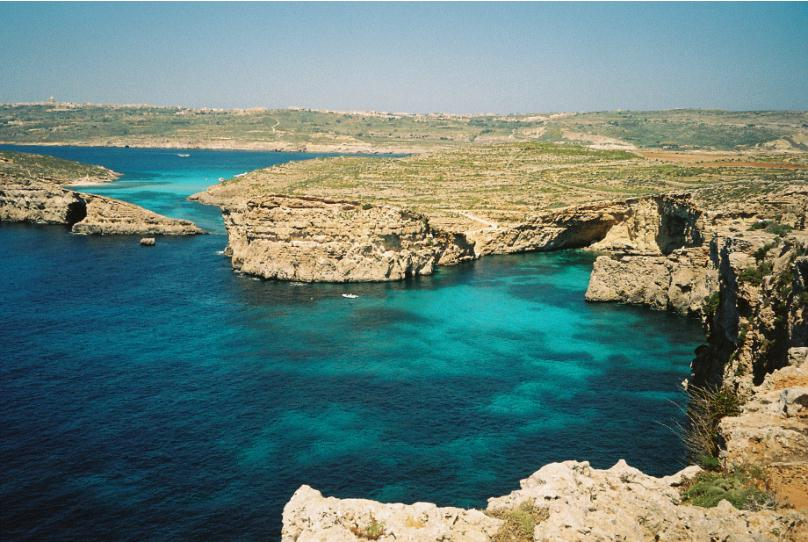
Comino's Blue Lagoon

Major event tourism, especially events centred on Catholicism, is an important segment of the Maltese tourism sector. During Holy Week, processions and religious services dominate the country and food stalls are set up in the village squares of Malta. Another popular major event is Carnival, a five centuries-old traditional celebration lasting for the five days preceding Ash Wednesday. Celebrations for Carnival involve float-based pageants, street parties and street food stalls. They are mostly Roman Catholic.

One of the biggest sporting events held on the island is the Malta Marathon. Held every year in late February or early March, the race attracts a number of international competitors and has been sponsored by Land Rover since 2009, BMW from 2003 to 2008, GoMobile in 2002 and Flora Malta in 2001 and prior. In 2009, the full marathon winner, a Belgian, recorded a time of 2:25:59. In 2010, approximately 1,400 entrants participated.

== Medical tourism ==
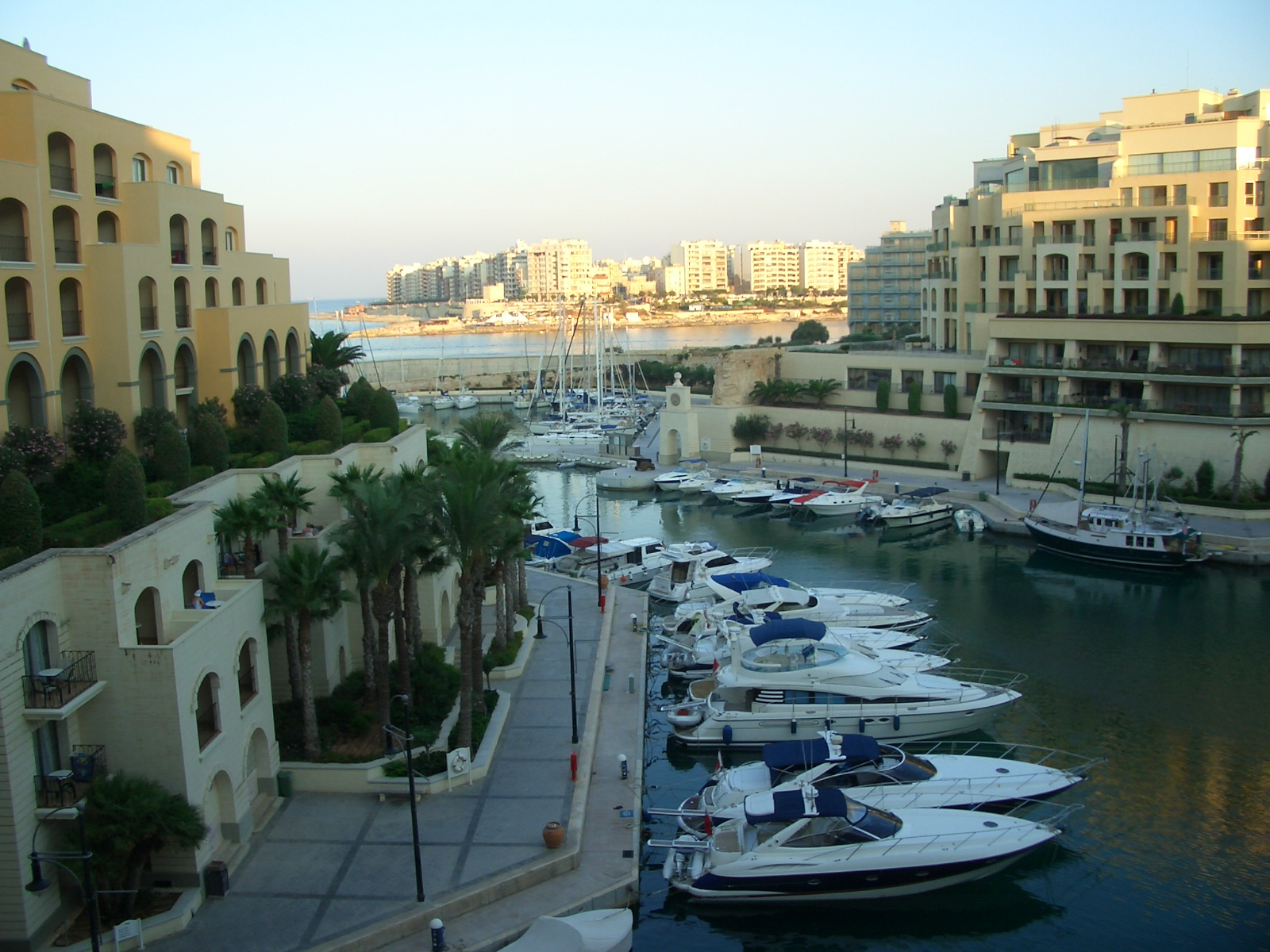
Typical architecture built in recent years in Malta.

St Julian's Malta a town in the Eastern Region of Malta

Traditional Maltese limestone buildings feature iconic, vibrant blue wooden balconies along a street in Valletta, Malta

Since 2010, the Malta Tourism Authority has been marketing Malta as a medical tourism destination. Focus areas for medical tourism include "cosmetic surgery, orthopedics, ophthalmic, neurological, urological, oncology, diagnostic, bariatric, and cardiac services." The focus target market for medical tourists in Malta is the United Kingdom, followed by North Africa, the Middle East, Russia and North America. Part of the reason for targeting the United Kingdom for medical tourists is that many members of Malta's medical profession were trained in the United Kingdom, increasing the confidence of British patients in those taking care of them. In addition, unlike some medical tourism destinations, Malta has a stable political climate. The Maltese government supports the development of medical tourism on the island but believes that private medical providers should be performing medical procedures, not government-run facilities.

== Educational tourism in ESL industry ==
Educational tourism highly contributes to the number of yearly inbound tourists in Malta. In recent years Malta has successfully become a dominant country in the ESL (English as a Second Language) industry. This can be attributed to the fact that English is an official language in Malta, as well as the congenial climate, cultural and historical heritage, the safe environment and high standard of living.

This has resulted in numerous quality English-language schools operating on the islands throughout the year. While most of the English-language schools are on Malta, some institutions have a centre on Gozo as well. In addition, there has been an increase in monitoring boards, teacher training courses, conferences and assessment procedures to ensure quality tuition is upheld.

English-language schools in Malta are accredited and licensed by various international and local institutions within the ESL industry. Such associations include IALC (International Association of Language Centres), ALTO (Association of language travel organisations), FELTOM (The Federation of English Language Teaching Organisations Malta), ELT Council, Bildungsurlaub, Erasmus, and Malta Tourism Authority.

== Visas ==
In addition to a valid passport, "documents substantiating the purpose and the conditions of the planned visit" and "sufficient means of support, both for the period of the planned visit and to return to their country of origin," travellers arriving in Malta may be required to have a visa for entry into the country.

European Union citizens have the right to travel freely into Malta without completing any special formalities. The nationals of many countries are not required to hold visas to enter Malta, although many are in accordance with uniform European Union regulations. A full list of nationalities required to hold visas to enter Malta and the Schengen Area is published on the Ministry of Foreign Affairs' web site.

While Malta cannot unilaterally drop the requirement for nations it makes agreements with to obtain visas to enter the Schengen Area through its border crossing points, it is permitted to offer visa discounts to certain nationalities. At present, Malta has 'visa facilitation agreements' with eight nations: Albania, Bosnia and Herzegovina, Moldova, Macedonia, Russia, Serbia and Ukraine.

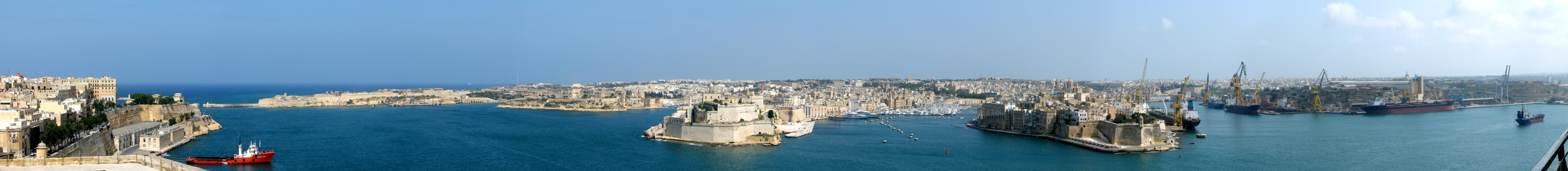
Grand Harbour looking eastwards, as seen from the Upper Barrakka Gardens

== Statistics ==
Tourist arrivals of 2024 in %

Tourism is a major component of the Maltese economy, constituting about 6.1 per cent of Malta's GDP in 2010. 1,183,012 tourists visited Malta in 2009. Although this is an 8 per cent drop from 2008, the number of tourists is expected to reach 1,300,000 by the end of 2010 (figures are not yet available). For the period January to December 2009, drops were recorded in visits from most countries sending large numbers of tourists to Malta, including Belgium, France, Germany, Ireland, the Netherlands, Russia, the Scandinavian countries, Spain, the United Kingdom and the United States, whilst a 24.7 per cent increase was recorded in visits to and from Libya. Visits from non-European Union countries took the greatest hit, with visits from these countries decreasing by 15 per cent compared to 2008. Comparatively, visits from European Union countries decreased only 7.4 per cent. Visits from the Eurozone dropped by an even smaller proportion, recording a fall of only 5.6 per cent.

The vast majority of visitors to Malta stayed for seven nights or longer, with the average stay length being 8.5 nights. While the number of people staying seven nights or longer in Malta fell by 13.4 per cent in 2009 compared to 2008, the number of people staying four to six nights jumped 7.5 per cent, and one to three nights by 1.5 per cent. Expenditure by tourists to Malta declined 12 per cent when compared to 2008 levels, with a recorded value of EUR 916.4 million.

=== Arrivals by country ===
Most visitors arriving to Malta on short-term basis were from the following countries of nationality:

Rank	Country	2014	2015	2016	2017	2018
1	United Kingdom	487,714	525,996	559,987	560,893	640,570
2	Italy	262,631	282,815	315,223	363,668	390,607
3	Germany	143,053	141,855	156,786	193,033	226,966
4	France	125,511	127,953	144,804	176,371	213,299
5	Spain	42,285	47,237	55,023	75,511	99,046
6	Poland	N/A	N/A	70,563	89,335	96,362
7	Belgium	31,399	35,937	41,759	73,429	70,191
8	Netherlands	44,697	44,962	52,642	64,000	57,355
9	United States	22,402	25,887	26,454	35,758	47,170
10	Switzerland	31,797	35,293	40,504	44,065	45,572
	Total foreign tourists	1,689,809	1,783,366	1,965,928	2,273,837	2,598,690

=== Historical trends ===
Tourism in Malta began to grow beginning in the mid-1960s. During the 1970s, Maltese tourism grew significantly, with numbers growing from 170,800 in 1970 to 705,500 in 1981. From 1981, the figures dropped to approximately 500,000 visitors per year until the late 1980s, when an upward trend began again. In the mid-1990s, figures were as high as 1.2 million tourists per year.

The volatility of the Maltese tourism market in the past has been largely due to trends in the preferences of tourists from the United Kingdom, who comprise Malta's largest tourism market. Although Malta's uniform use of English, its traditional ties to the United Kingdom and low-cost travel options have made it an attractive option to British tourists, changing preferences of these tourists can impact Malta's tourism income quite significantly. For example, the increasing preference of British tourists for Spanish destinations during the 1980s was reflected in a drop in Malta's tourism numbers during that period.

Tourist Arrivals to Malta (2001–2024)
Year	Tourist Arrivals
2001	1,146,262
2002	1,098,446
2003	1,089,548
2004	1,156,440
2005	1,170,816
2006	1,124,232
2007	1,243,506
2008	1,290,856
2009	1,182,490
2010	1,338,841
2011	1,415,018
2012	1,443,414
2013	1,582,153
2014	1,689,809
2015	1,783,366
2016	1,965,928
2017	2,273,837
2018	2,598,690
2019	2,753,239
2020	658,567
2021	968,136
2022	2,286,597
2023	2,981,476
2024	3,563,618
2025	4,022,310

== Market issues ==
Malta's tourism industry faces a number of issues affecting it now and threatening to affect it in the future. One of the clearest issues facing Malta's tourism industry is overcrowding as a result of the island nation's relatively small size, in terms of both area and population. Malta is a nation of just under 450,000 people, yet its infrastructure is required to support 2.6 million tourists every year. Malta's water works, roads, waste management systems and beaches are stretched to capacity in the summer months of July and August of every year, when tourism numbers are at their peak. This is a challenge facing Maltese tourism operators as it means that they cannot simply pursue the kinds of 'mass tourism' marketing measures taken by operators in other Mediterranean destinations with more space and resources to pursue them. In addition, Maltese tourism operators must balance increased tourism numbers with the needs of the 'native population', as when resources are stretched thin by tourists during the summer season, there are negative impacts on Maltese residents also.

== See also ==
- List of museums in Malta
