= Gozo Channel Line =

Maltese ferry company

Gozo Channel Company Limited
- Logo
- Predecessor: E. Zammit & Sons Ltd
- Founded: 1979
- Headquarters: Mġarr, Gozo
- Area served: Gozo Channel
- Services: Passenger transportation
- Website: www.gozochannel.com

The Gozo Channel Company Limited, commonly known as Gozo Channel Line or the Gozo ferry (Maltese: Vapur t'Għawdex), is a Maltese company founded in 1979 that operates ferry services between the islands of Malta and Gozo using roll-on/roll-off (RORO) ferries. Crossings happen throughout the day all-year round including weekends, public holidays, and night services.

The company's ferry services are the main connection between the two main Maltese islands and are used by millions of Gozitans, Maltese and tourists every year. It currently operates three identical ferries, all of which were built between March 2000 and March 2002. In addition to the normal services of foot passengers and car passengers, Gozo Channel also offers services for cargo vehicles and hazardous cargo.

Current fleet

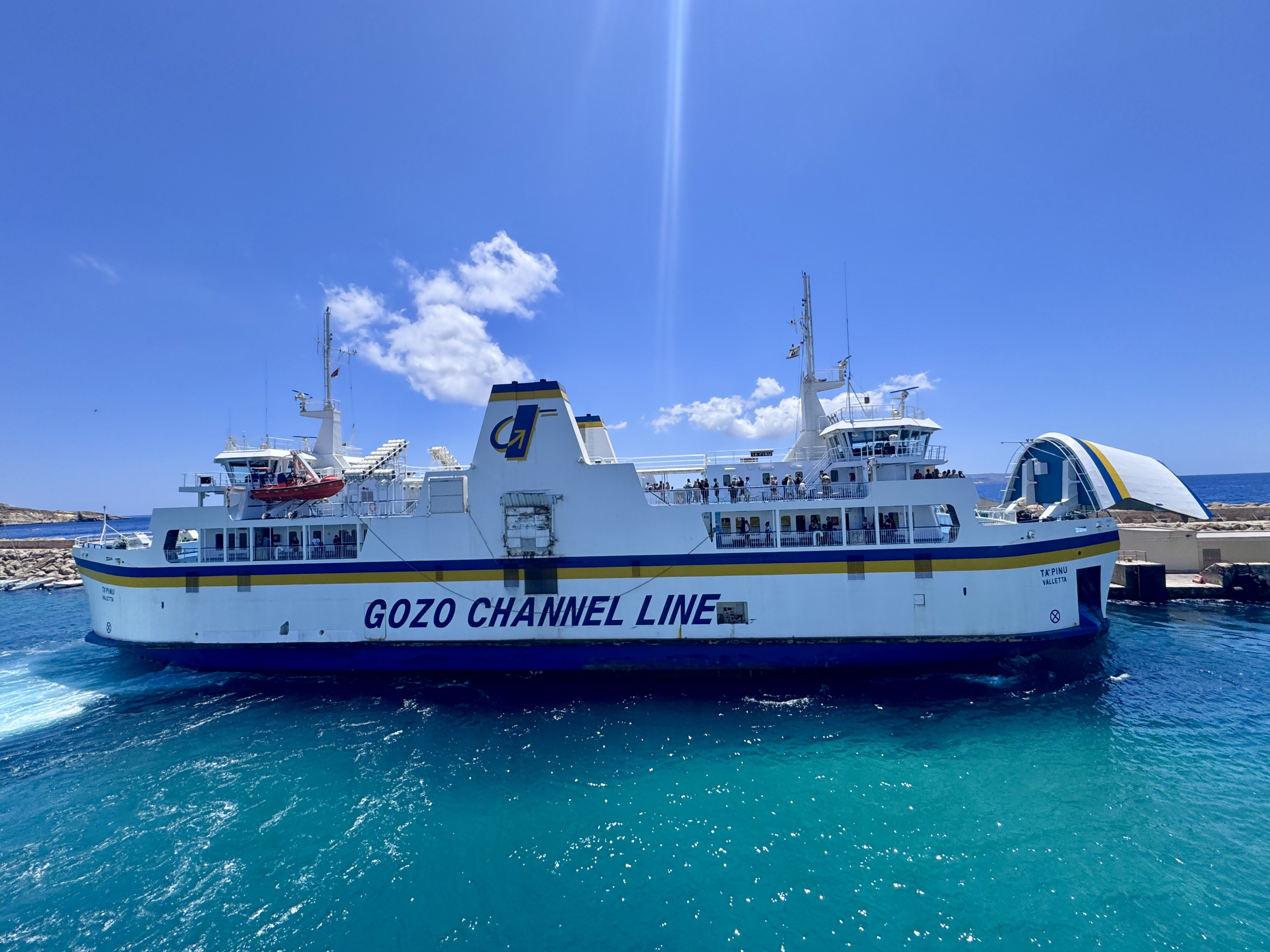
MV Ta' Pinu

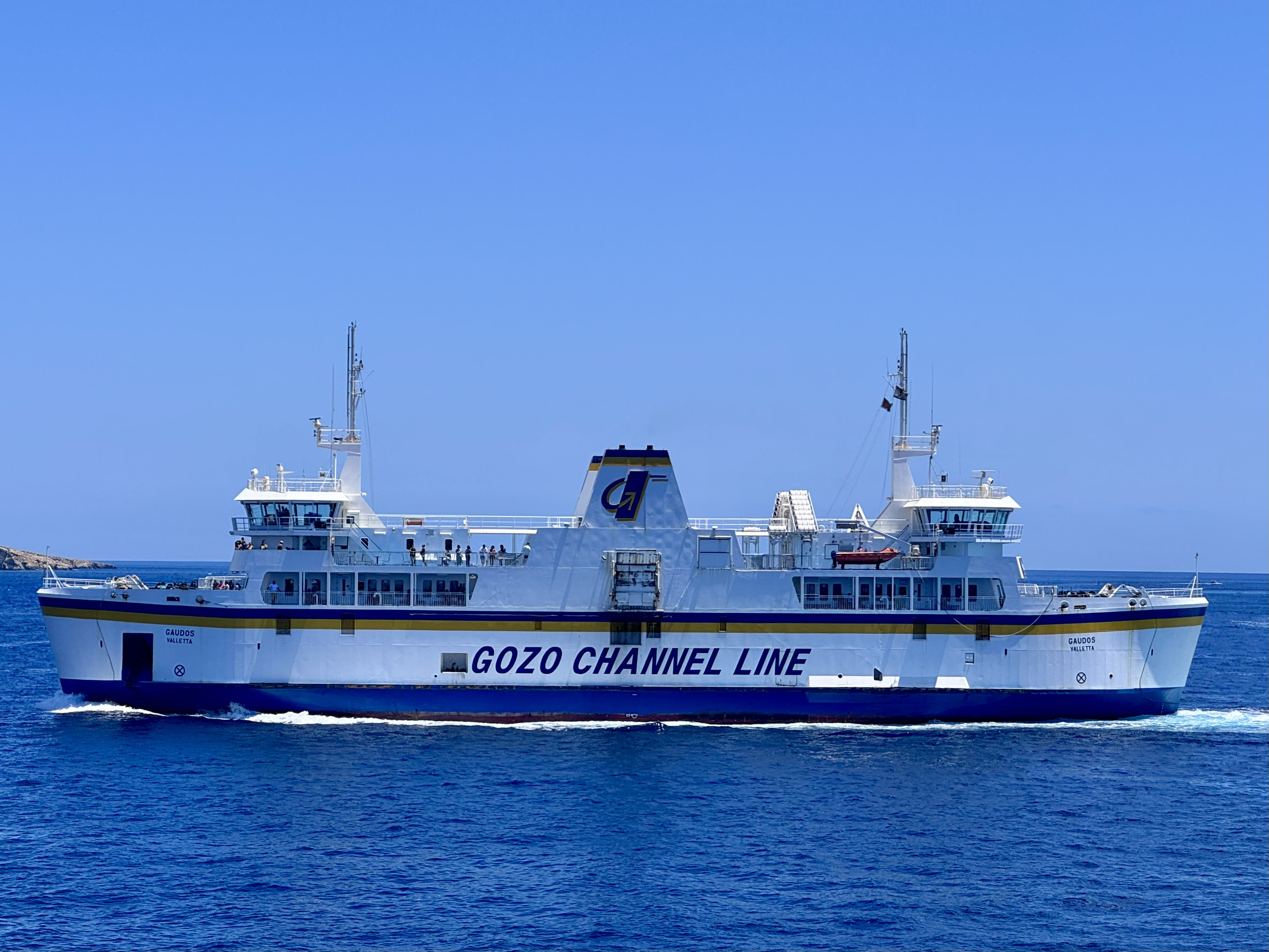
MV Gaudos

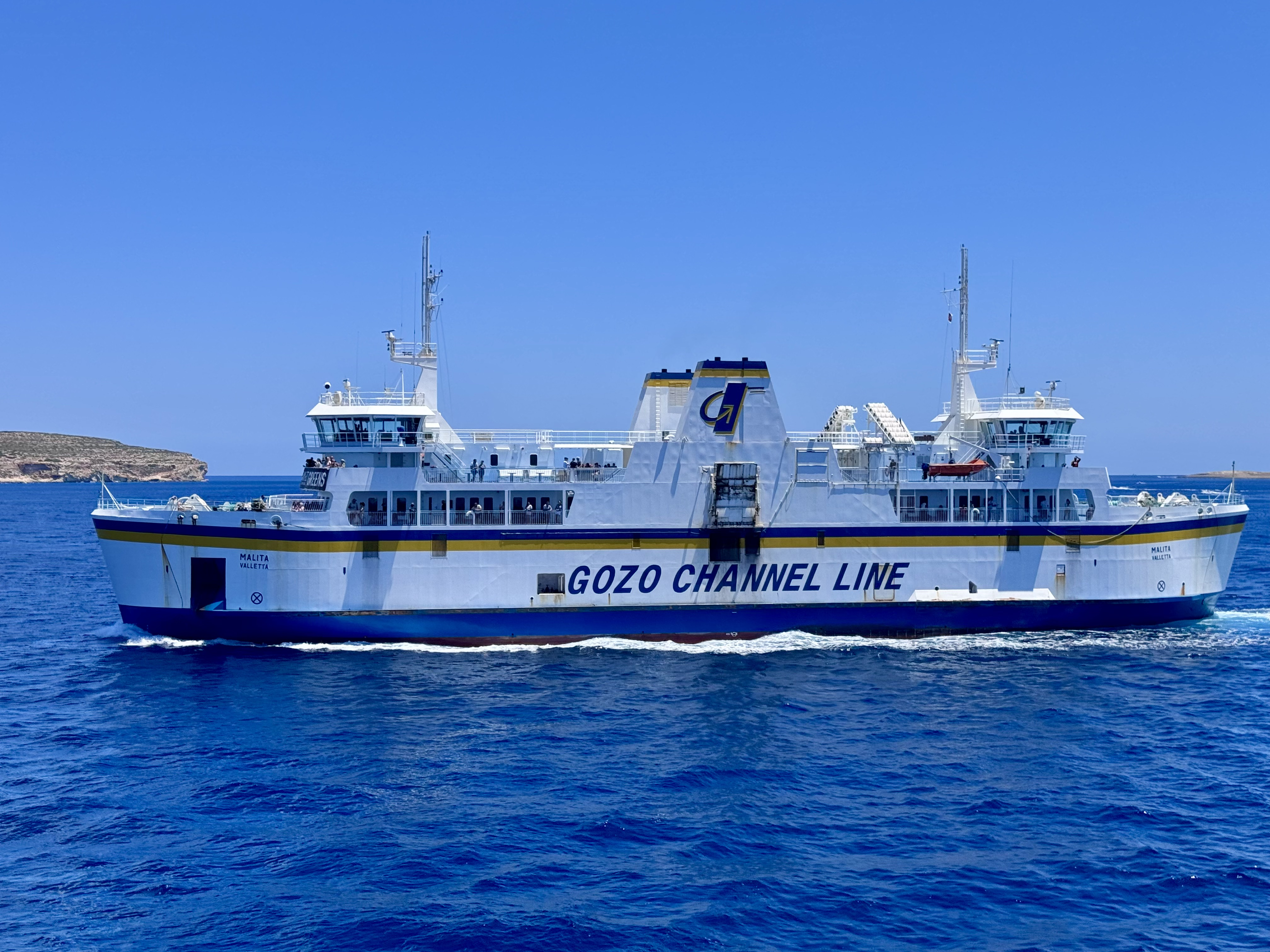
MV Malita

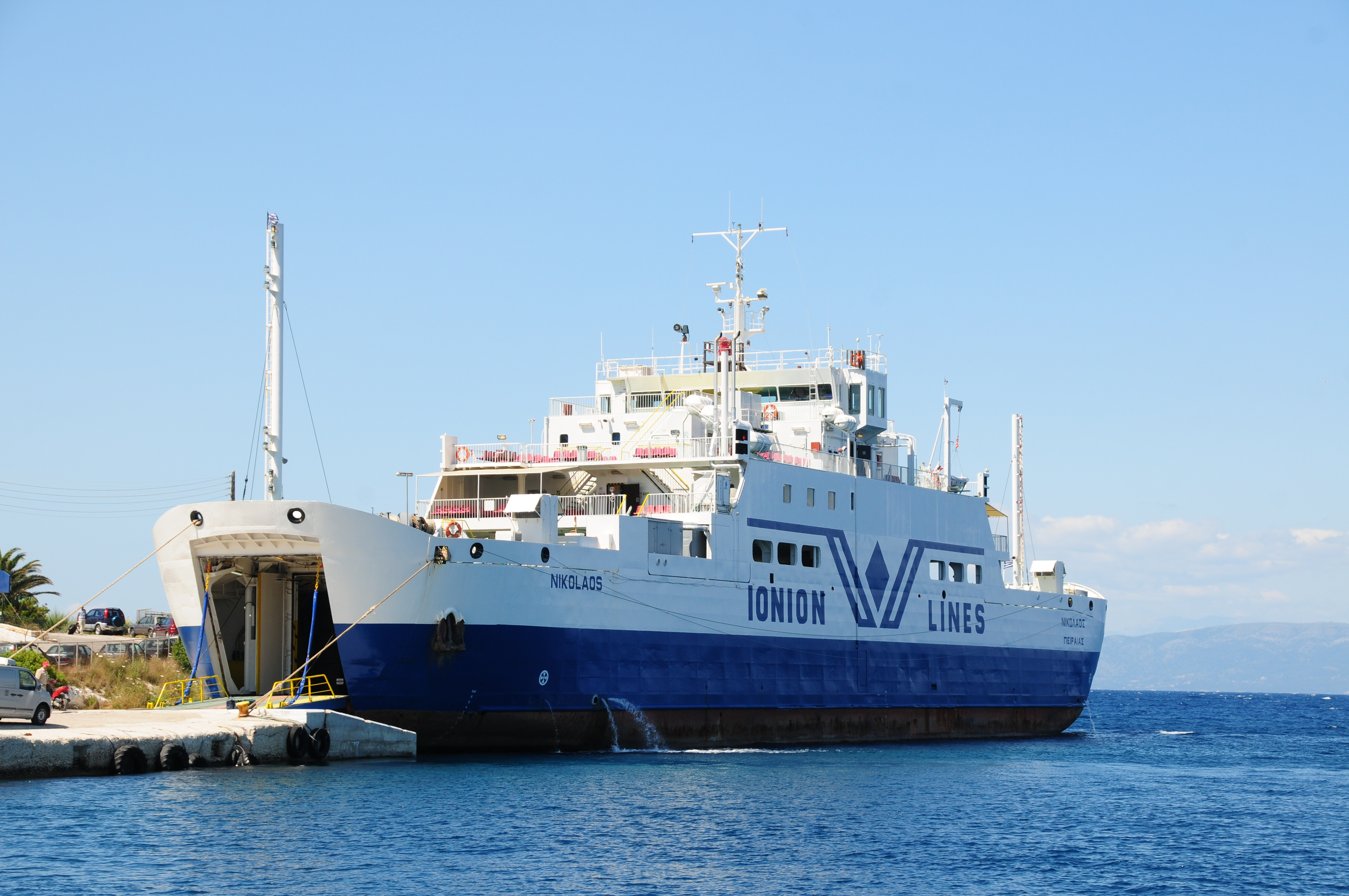
MV Nikolaos (not in Gozo Channel livery)

== Predecessors ==
A ferry service connecting the islands of Malta and Gozo has existed for centuries, with records indicating that dgħajjes tal-latini were used as ferries as early as 1241 from the harbour of Mġarr. Dgħajjes tal-latini, also known as Gozo boats, remained in use until after the Second World War. A few survive to this day, such as the Maryanne, operated by Captain Morgan Cruises, although this does not have any masts.

However, the first regular passenger service between the islands was only inaugurated on 13 June 1885, when O.F. Gollcher & Sons Ltd provided an official mail service using the vessel Gleneagles. By the end of the 19th century G.P. Sammut & Co and Francesco Pace were also offering ferry services. These three companies had stopped operating services by 1923, when the Malta Steamship Co Ltd took over with two vessels. In the late 1920s and 1930s Bernard Zammit and the Joseph Gasan, Giovanni Dacoutros & Grech Family started their own ferry services. More companies were formed after the war, including Joseph Gasan (1947–57), the Magro Family (1948–70), the Magro & Zammit Families (1958–68) and the Malta Aliscafi Ltd (1964–68). At times, there was only one company operating services in the Gozo Channel while at other times multiple companies were simultaneously doing that.

E. Zammit & Sons Ltd was formed in 1966, and by 1970 it was the only company offering ferry services across the Gozo Channel. It operated four vessels until Gozo Channel Company Limited was formed in 1979.

The following ships were used as ferries between Malta and Gozo from 1885 to 1978:

Name	From	To	Company	Note
Gleneagles	1885	1914	O.F. Gollcher Ltd	Launched 1884 in Aberdeen for Hall Russell & Co and sold to Gollcher in 1885. Requisitioned by the Royal Navy in 1914, returned in 1918 but sold in 1919 and used in the eastern Mediterranean. Sunk 1920 and refloated 1922. Renamed Missir (1922–23), Alexandretta (1923–24), Pandy (1924–25) and Abdel Kader (1925–33). Wrecked at Alexandria, 1933.
Princess Melita	1893	1923	G.P. Sammut & Co	
Piemonte	1897	1901	Francesco Pace	
Wembley	1923	1935	Malta Steamship Co Ltd	
Lady Strickland	1929	1951	Bernard Zammit	
Golly	1932	1937	Malta Steamship Co Ltd	Built in Japan in 1912 as the Fukuhaku Maru no.5 (1912–21). Later known as patrol boat G27 (1921) and Andrea Bafile (1921–32). Sold to Malta Steamship Co. Ltd in 1932 and renamed Golly. Sold in 1937 and renamed Daisy. Foundered on the way to Alexandria in 1939.
King of England	1933	1951	Bernard Zammit	Built in 1902 for the Royal Navy. Sold to Zammit in 1933 and requisitioned by the Navy in 1942 but returned after two months. Later sold to Galzamhil & Co. (1944–51) and Mario Farrugia (1951). Broken up in Italy in 1951.
Franco	1936	1948	Joseph Gasan, Giovanni Dacoutros & Grech Family	
Royal Lady	1937	1942	Joseph Gasan, Giovanni Dacoutros & Grech Family	Sunk at Marfa on 6 May 1942 by Luftwaffe bombers.
Anna	1942	1942	Joseph Gasan, Giovanni Dacoutros & Grech Family	
Hanini	1948	1956	Magro Family	
Calypso	1950	1950	Joseph Gasan	Built in 1942 for the Royal Navy as HMS J-826 (later renamed BYMS-2026). Decommissioned 1946 and sold to Gasan in 1949. Became a ferry for a couple of months before it was sold to Irish millionaire Thomas Guinness who loaned it to Jacques Cousteau as a research ship. It was abandoned after 1997 and is to undergo refurbishment.
Bancinu	1950	1957	Joseph Gasan	Built as the yacht Migrant in 1927. Renamed Victrix (1931–36), Audacieux (1936–38) and Migrante (1938–39). Requisitioned by the Royal Navy as armed yacht FY 019 (1939–46) and sold to Gasan in 1947. It was renovated and entered service in 1950 as the Bancinu. Sold in Greece in 1957 and renamed Athinai (1958–61), Sirius (1961–64) and Vorioi Sporades. Exact fate unknown, possibly sunk off Metaponto with radioactive material on board, or scrapped in Perama in 1970. Deleted from the registers in 1988.
Maid of Pinto	1950	1957	Joseph Gasan	
Pinu	1950	1957	Joseph Gasan	
Queen of Peace	1956	1970	Magro Family	Built as a Royal Navy minesweeper. Laid up at Marsa in 1970. Sunk in the Gulf of Sirte in 1977 with the loss of 3 Maltese crew.
Imperial Eagle	1958	1968	Magro & Zammit Families	Built as the replacement of the Royal Lady (which also served as a Gozo ferry) in 1938. Known as New Royal Lady (1938–47), Royal Lady (1948) and Crested Eagle (1948–58). Used as a ferry from 1958 onwards as Imperial Eagle. Later used as a cargo ship and for some time it lay half sunk at the Grand Harbour. Purchased by the diving community in 1995 and scuttled as an artificial reef off Qawra in 1999. It is now a popular dive site.
Delfin	1964	1968	Malta Aliscafi Ltd	
Minor Eagle; Cominoland	1966	1978 (Note: Remained in use as a ferry until 1980 by Gozo Channel Co Ltd.)	E. Zammit & Sons Ltd	Built as the Royal Navy ship Miner VI in 1942. Renamed Minor Eagle in 1966 and Cominoland in 1976. Operated by Gozo Channel Company Limited in 1979–1980.
Jylland	1967	1978 (Note: Remained in use as a ferry until 1984 by Gozo Channel Co Ltd.)	E. Zammit & Sons Ltd	Built as the Royal Navy ship PCE 828 in 1943 and renamed Kilbride later that year. Renamed Jylland in 1948 and sold to Zammit in 1976. Operated by Gozo Channel Company Limited in 1979–1984.
Calypsoland	1969	1978 (Note: Remained in use as a ferry until 1984 by Gozo Channel Co Ltd.)	E. Zammit & Sons Ltd	Built as the Prins Hendrik in 1932. Purchased in 1968 and renamed Calypsoland. Operated by Gozo Channel Company Limited in 1979–1984.
Melitaland	1974	1978 (Note: Remained in use as a ferry until 1996 by Gozo Channel Co Ltd.)	E. Zammit & Sons Ltd	Built as the Dordrecht in 1933. Purchased in 1974 and renamed Melitaland. Operated by Gozo Channel Company Limited in 1979–1994.

== History ==
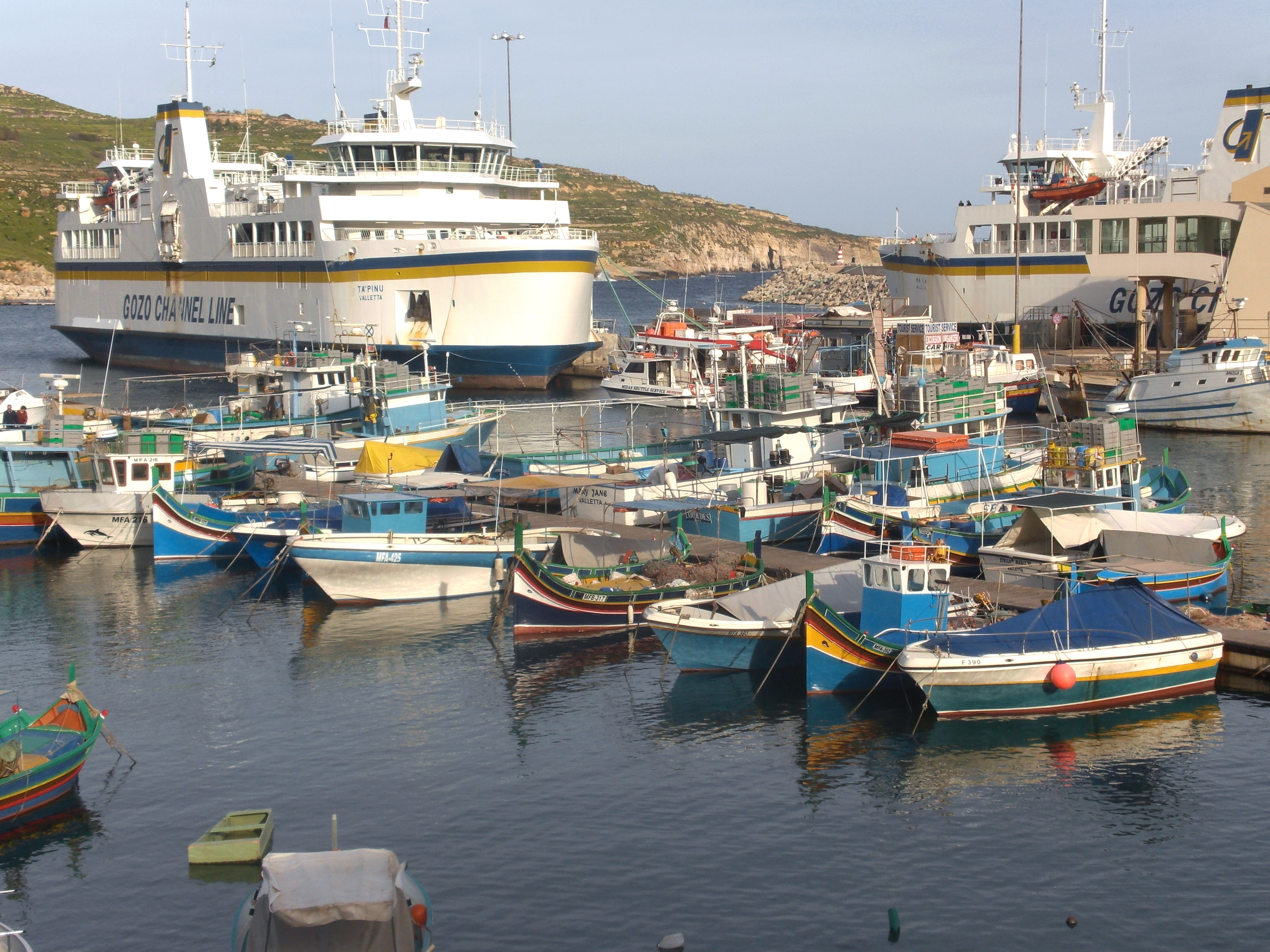
MV Ta' Pinu at Mġarr

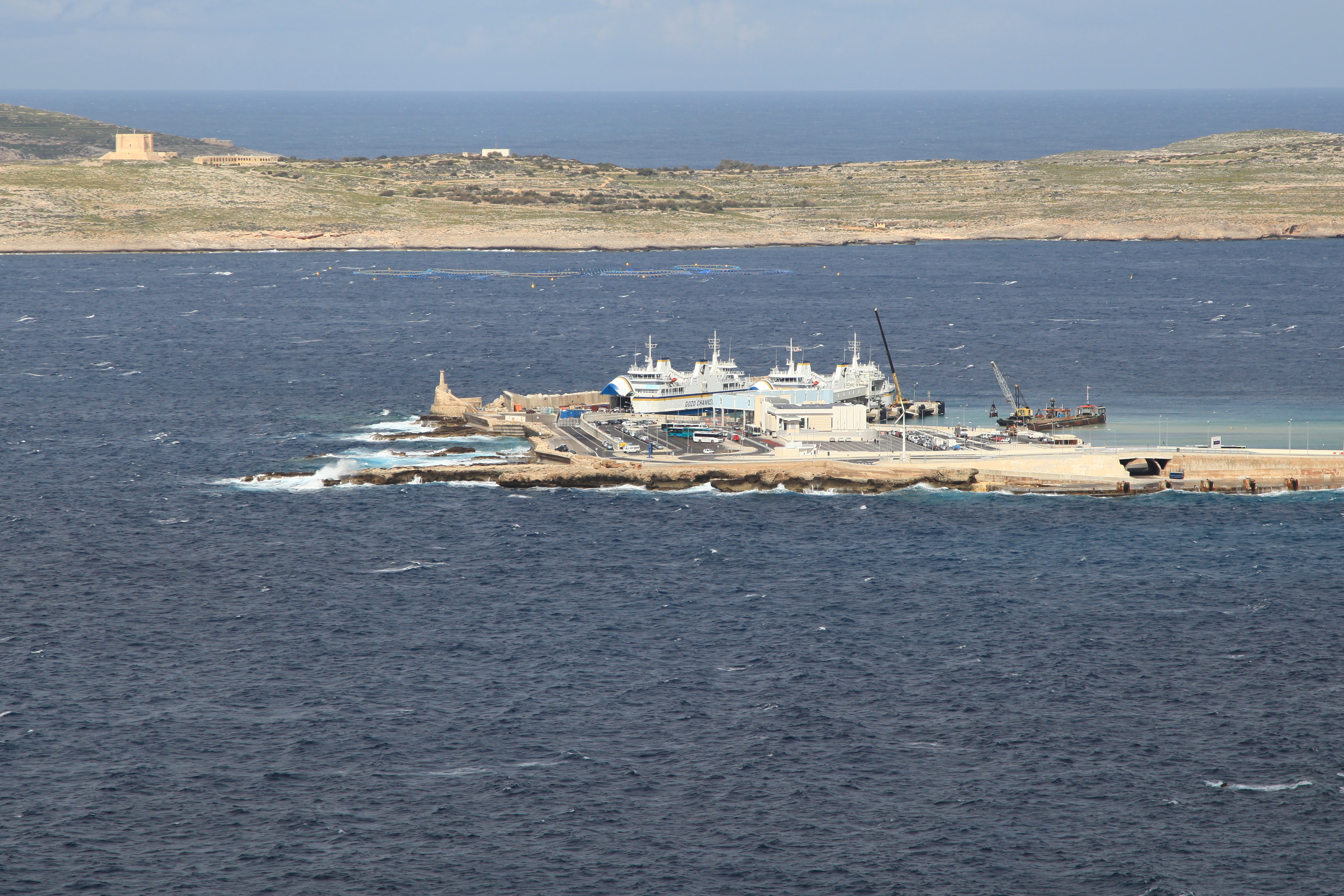
Ċirkewwa Harbour

Gozo Channel Company Limited was formed to operate ferry services in 1979. The four ships of E. Zammit & Sons Ltd were taken over by the new company, and two more vessels were purchased later in the year. The MV Għawdex began operating services to Sicily from 1981 onwards, but these stopped in 1995.

Hovermarines or catamarans were used for express services between Malta and Gozo from 1988 to 2002. By 1990 the company was carrying 1.93 million passengers and 370,000 cars annually. By the mid-1990s a modernization program started and three brand new ships were built from 2000 to 2002. Mġarr ferry terminal was later completely rebuilt from 2001 to 2008. The terminal at Ċirkewwa was also rebuilt in the next few years and was completed in 2013.

Name	Namesake	Built	In commission	Note
MV Cominoland	Comino	1942	1979-1980 (Note: Had been used as a ferry since 1966 under E. Zammit & Sons Ltd under the name Minor Eagle (1966-76) and Cominoland (1976-78).)	Formerly a ferry of E. Zammit & Sons Ltd. Sold and renamed Jylland II (1980–2006) and again Cominoland (2006). Scuttled as an artificial reef off Xatt l-Ahmar in 2006.
MV Jylland		1943	1979-1984 (Note: Had been used as a ferry since 1967 under E. Zammit & Sons Ltd.)	Formerly a ferry of E. Zammit & Sons Ltd. Sold in 1984 and renamed Kybris (1984), Akdeniz (1984–86) and Princess Lydia (1986–88). Scrapped in Turkey in 1988.
MV Calypsoland	Calypso	1932	1979-1984 (Note: Had been used as a ferry since 1969 under E. Zammit & Sons Ltd.)	Formerly a ferry of E. Zammit & Sons Ltd. Used occasionally to carry building material to Comino. Scrapped in Malta in 1985.
MV Melitaland; MV Bezz 20	Malta	1933	1979-1996 (Note: Had been used as a ferry since 1974 under E. Zammit & Sons Ltd.)	Formerly a ferry of E. Zammit & Sons Ltd. Sister ship to the Cittadella. Renamed Bezz 20 in 1994, sold for scrap in 1996.
MV Għawdex	Gozo	1962	1979-2000	Built in Bremen in 1962. Formerly known as the Kalle (1962–71) and the Rotna (1971–78). Sold in 2000 and renamed Virgem de Fatima but remained laid up in Valletta until she was broken up in Turkey in 2002.
MV Mgarr	Mġarr Harbour	1967	1979-1995	Built in Denmark in 1967. Formerly known as the Saltholm (1967–79). Sold for scrap in 1995.
MV Cittadella; MV Citta	The Citadella, Gozo	1949	1987-1997	Built in the Netherlands in 1949. Formerly known as the Prins Bernhard (1949–87). Sister ship to the Melitaland. Renamed Citta in 1995, sold for scrap in 1997 in Turkey.
SES Calypso	Calypso		1988-1996	Built by Hovermarine, Southampton.
MV Xlendi	Xlendi Bay	1955	1990-1997	Built in Denmark in 1955. Formerly known as the Helsingor (1955–87), Royal Sheeba (1987–88) and Borgshorn (1988–90). It was regarded as an 'unfortunate' ship since it was shaped like a coffin, and in fact it was damaged several times when it ran aground (1992), hitting the quay (1995) and by fire (1999). It was scuttled as an artificial reef in 1999, but the wreck sank upside down so it is only suitable for experienced divers.
MV Calypso	Calypso	1970	1993-2004	Built in Denmark in 1970. Formerly known as the Karnan (1970–93). Sold in 2004 and scrapped in 2012.
MV Mgarr	Mġarr Harbour	1963	1995-2002	Built in the Netherlands in 1963. Formerly known as the Marsdiep (1963–92). Sister ship to the Cittadella II. Sold in 2002 for scrap in Turkey.
MV Cittadella II	The Citadella, Gozo	1966	1995-2002	Built in the Netherlands in 1966. Formerly known as the Texelstroom (1963–92). Sister ship to the Mgarr. Sold in 2002 for scrap in Turkey.
SES Victoria Express		1984	1996-2002	Built in Norway in 1984. Formerly known as the Norcat (1984–86), Fjordkongen (1986–92) and Ulstein Surfer (1992–96). Sold in 2002 and renamed The Gambian Princess.
MV Ta' Pinu	Ta' Pinu Sanctuary	2000	2000–present	Built by Malta Shipbuilding in 2000. Identical to the Gaudos and Malita.
MV Gaudos	Gozo	2001	2001–present	Built by Malta Shipbuilding in 2001. Identical to the Ta' Pinu and Malita with the exception of the absence of the hoistable car deck found on both other vessels.
MV Malita	Malta	2002	2002–present	Built by Malta Shipbuilding in 2002. Identical to the Ta' Pinu and Gaudos
MV Nikolaos		1987	2019–present	Built in 1987.
