= Mġarr, Gozo =

Harbour town in Gozo, Malta

Coordinates: 36°01′33″N 14°17′43″E

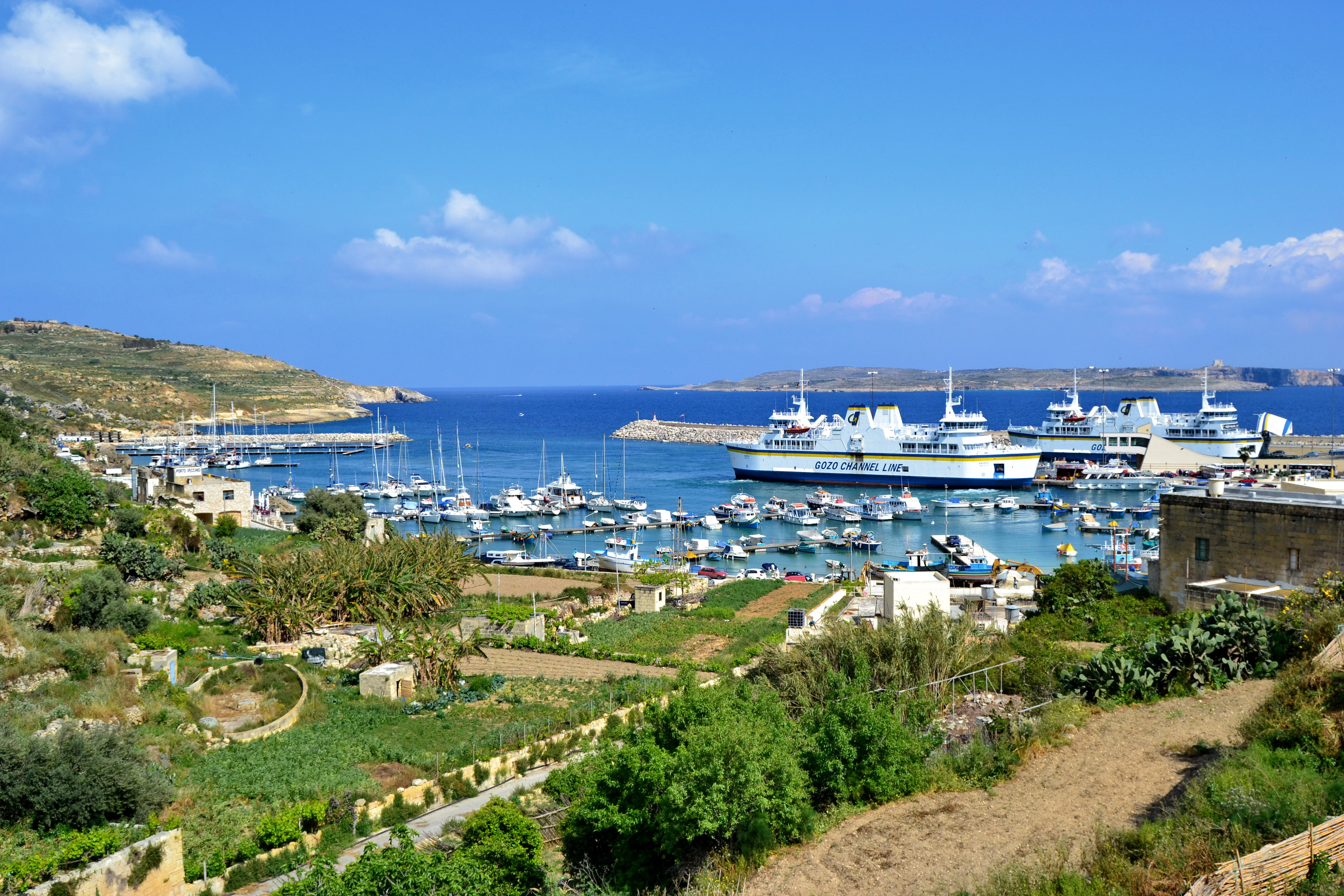
The harbour of Mġarr

Mġarr is a harbour located in Għajnsielem, in south-eastern Gozo, Malta.

It is the 17th-largest maritime port in the European Union in terms of the number of vessels received, making it the largest in Malta.

== Etymology ==
The name Mġarr may have originated from the Arabic word mġar, meaning "port".

== History ==
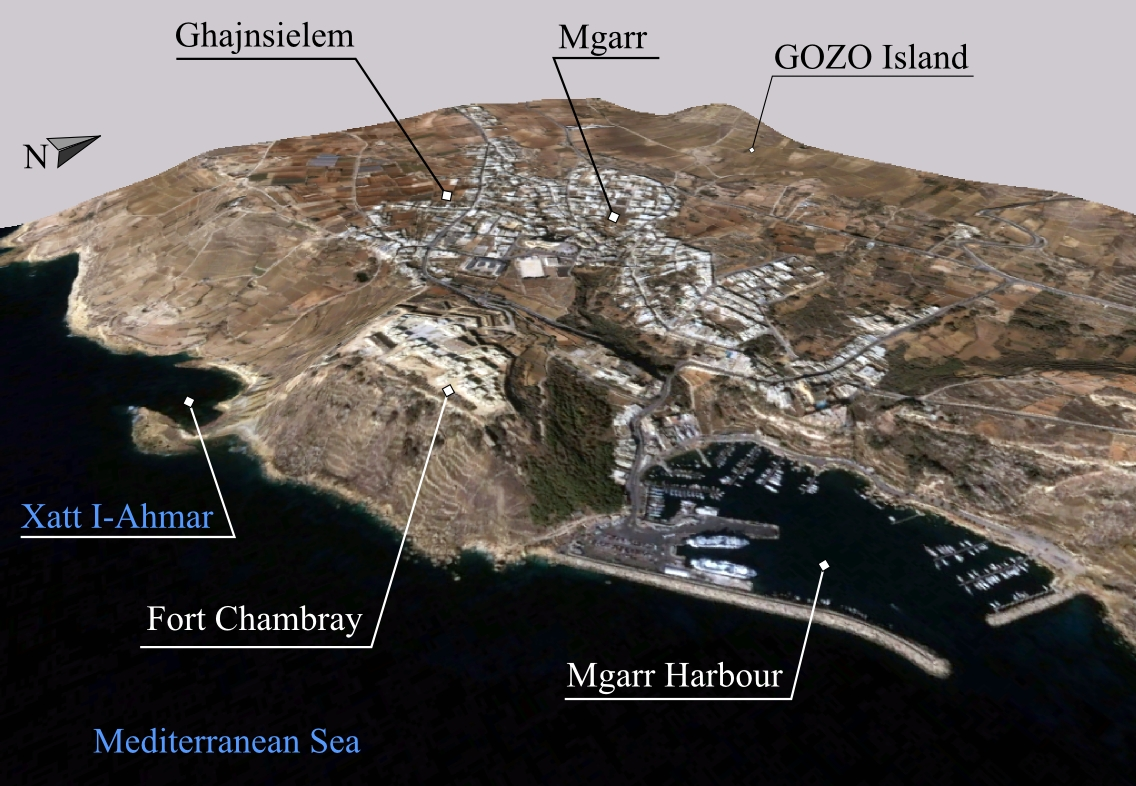
A 3D model of Mġarr

The town of Mġarr grew around the shallow harbour that shares its name. Ferry services to Malta were in operation by 1241, and fishing was already established. While the area around the harbour was developed over the following centuries, there was little development of the harbour itself until 1841, when a breakwater was constructed to provide more shelter for the port. This breakwater was strengthened and extended several times up to 1906. A larger breakwater was constructed between 1929 and 1935, and two more in 1969; on completion of the latter, the area of the port was expanded to 121,400 square metres.

The ferry terminal was rebuilt at a cost of €9.3 million in the early 21st century. Work began in 2001 and took seven years, with the terminal opening in February 2008. The harbour now has facilities for around 600 passengers and 200 cars. The design of the new harbour was changed during the construction process to reduce its visual impact on the surrounding landscape.

== Economy and facilities ==
Mġarr is the largest fishing village on Gozo. In addition to the ferry terminal, a yacht marina is also located in the town. Mġarr is overlooked by Fort Chambray, constructed in 1749 by the Knights of St. John.

In May 2010, it was announced that the marina would be privatised. Operation transferred to the Harbour Management Company Limited, which intended to develop and modernise the marina.

The Gleneagles Bar, which stands next to the original jetty in the harbour, was constructed as a cabin for ferry passengers in 1732 and has a unique sloping roof.

== Transport ==
Mġarr is linked by ferry services to Ċirkewwa and Valletta on Malta and to the island of Comino. Buses run to Victoria and Marsalforn.
