= Opinion polling for the 2022 Maltese general election =

In the run up to the 2022 Maltese general election, various organizations carried out opinion polling to gauge voting intention in Malta. Results of such polls are displayed in this article. Opinion polls have shown that, the governing Labour Party was indicated to win in the general election.

== Opinion polls ==
=== Expressing a preference ===
View source data.

The values in the table below are derived by removing non-party responses (i.e. non-voters, "don't know", and "no reply"); as the margin is also recalculated, there may be slight differences in exact lead margins due to rounding.

Polling firm	Fieldwork date	Sample size	PL	PN	PD	AD	MPM	Others	Lead
MaltaToday	21-24 Mar 2022	2,955	53.5	44.5	–		–	2.0	9.0
Sagalytics	24 Mar 2022	?	55.9	42.8	–		–	1.3	13.1
Vincent Marmará	18-23 Mar 2022	1,800	55.9	42.8	–		–	1.3	13.1
MaltaToday	23 Mar 2022	?	53.3	44.7	–		–	2.0	8.6
MaltaToday	22 Mar 2022	?	53.3	44.6	–		–	2.1	8.7
Sagalytics	21 Mar 2022	?	55.6	43.0	–		–	1.4	12.6
MaltaToday	21 Mar 2022	?	53.8	44.4	–		–	1.9	9.4
Times of Malta	20 Mar 2022	–	55.1	43.5	–		–	1.4	11.6
MaltaToday	17 Mar 2022	?	53.3	44.7	–		–	2.0	8.6
MaltaToday	15 Mar 2022	?	52.9	45.1	–		–	2.0	7.8
Sagalytics	13 Mar 2022	?	55.5	42.7	–		–	1.8	12.8
MaltaToday	13 Mar 2022	?	53.2	44.8	–		–	2.0	8.4
MaltaToday	3–9 Mar 2022	?	53.2	44.8	–		–	2.0	8.4
MaltaToday	2–8 Mar 2022	?	53.0	44.8	–		–	1.8	8.2
MaltaToday	1–7 Mar 2022	?	52.7	42.3	0.4		–	4.6	10.4
MaltaToday	21 Feb-4 Mar 2022	1220	52.7	42.3	–		–	0.8	10.4
Sagalytics	26 Feb–3 Mar 2022	1,000	55.2	43.0	–		0.0	1.8	12.2
MaltaToday	21–26 Feb 2022	597	50.6	42.7	0.1		–	1.5	7.9
Sagalytics	26–25 Feb 2022	?	55.9	42.5	1.6		0.0	0.0	13.4
Times of Malta	14–24 Feb 2022	600	56.2	42.4	–		–	1.4	13.8
MaltaToday	31 Jan–4 Feb 2022	643	55.8	41.0	2.1		–	0.0	14.8
Sagalytics	28 Jan–2 Feb 2022	?	56.0	42.4	1.6		0.0	0.0	13.6
MaltaToday	5–12 Jan 2022	647	58.4	38.4	1.2		–	0.8	20.0
MaltaToday	26 Nov 2021 – 2 Dec 2021	652	58.5	40.7	0.1		–	0.0	17.8
MaltaToday	28 Oct 2021 – 3 Nov 2021	852	57.7	39.7	1.1		–	0.0	19.0
MaltaToday	27 Sep 2021 – 6 Oct 2021	647	57.4	36.3	2.1		–	0.0	21.1
MaltaToday	25 Aug 2021 – 2 Sep 2021	651	56.5	40.0	1.5		–	0.0	16.5
MaltaToday	28 Jun 2021 – 6 Jul 2021	651	56.4	40.7	1.4		–	0.0	15.7
MaltaToday	31 May – 4 Jun 2021	650	59.3	38.0	1.0		–	0.0	21.3
MaltaToday	3–7 May 2021	649	58.4	39.1	0.7		–	0.0	19.3
MaltaToday	5–9 Apr 2021	647	52.1	44.4	0.5		–	0.5	7.7
MaltaToday	1–5 Mar 2021	649	52.2	43.4	2.3		–	0.0	8.8
MaltaToday	1–5 Feb 2021	649	53.1	42.6	0.8		–	0.0	10.5
MaltaToday	4–8 Jan 2021	640	54.3	43.4	1.2		–	0.0	11.9
MaltaToday	30 Nov – 4 Dec 2020	641	57.1	40.4	0.4		–	0.0	16.7
MaltaToday	2–6 Nov 2020	654	56.4	41.4	0.9		–	0.0	15.0
MaltaToday	5–9 Oct 2020	654	54.6	41.1	1.2		–	0.0	13.5
MaltaToday	31 Aug – 4 Sep 2020	655	61.7	32.1	0.5	0.0	–	0.0	29.6
MaltaToday	13–17 Jul 2020	585	65.4	28.5	0.0	1.0	–	0.0	36.9
MaltaToday	12–18 Jun 2020	653	64.5	30.5	0.8	1.4	0.0	0.0	34.0
MaltaToday	11–15 May 2020	653	69.0	29.4	0.1	1.4	0.0	0.0	39.6
MaltaToday	6–9 Apr 2020	652	66.3	31.4	0.0	0.1	0.0	0.0	34.9
MaltaToday	3–10 Mar 2020	653	68.1	26.3	–	2.2	0.0	0.0	41.8
MaltaToday	21–28 Jan 2020	655	66.3	32.1	1.1	0.5	0.0	0.0	34.2
MaltaToday	24–31 Oct 2019	656	61.2	37.1	0.8	0.8	0.0	0.0	14.1
MaltaToday	26 Sep – 3 Oct 2019	652	63.3	32.5	2.1	2.1	0.0	0.0	30.8
Sagalytics	16–20 Sep 2019	660	58.1	39.1	0.0	1.0	0.0	0.0	19.0
2019 EP election	25 May 2019	–	54.3	37.9	2.0	0.7	0.3	5.1	16.4
MaltaToday	9–15 May 2019	652	57.8	38.1	1.0	0.4	0.1	1.5	19.7
MaltaToday	25 Apr – 3 May 2019	602	58.0	38.4	1.1	1.3	0.0	1.6	19.6
MaltaToday	28 Mar – 4 Apr 2019	597	62.5	37.5	0.0	0.0	0.0	0.0	25.0
MaltaToday	22–27 Feb 2019	598	59.5	38.4	1.3	0.8	0.0	0.0	11.1
MaltaToday	21–28 Jan 2019	597	62.6	36.4	0.4	0.6	0.0	0.0	26.2
MaltaToday	6–14 Dec 2018	597	61.2	36.8	1.1	0.9	0.0	0.0	24.5
MaltaToday	5–8 Nov 2018	597	68.8	29.1	1.0	1.0	0.0	0.0	39.7
MaltaToday	1–6 Oct 2018	601	60.3	36.9	0.5	0.2	0.0	0.0	23.5
MaltaToday	27–30 Aug 2018	605	64.5	33.5	1.8	0.3	0.0	0.0	30.9
MaltaToday	27 Jul–2 Aug 2018	14	65.4	34.0	0.0	0.6	0.0	0.0	31.4
Esprimi	26–27 Jul 2018	1,100	65.4	23.1	–	3.5	–	8.0	42.4
Sagalytics Archived	Jun 2018	?	58.5	40.7	–	–	–	0.8	17.8
MaltaToday	28–31 May 2018	552	63.0	35.7	0.5	0.8	0.0	0.0	27.4
MaltaToday	23–27 Apr 2018	553	58.0	40.7	0.0	0.9	0.4	0.0	17.4
MaltaToday	26 Feb–1 Mar 2018	501	63.3	33.0	2.7	1.0	0.0	0.0	30.2
Sagalytics	12–20 Feb 2018	600	60.5	37.5	–	–	–	1.9	23.0
MaltaToday	23–29 Jan 2018	501	58.3	40.1	0.0	1.7	0.0	0.0	18.2
MaltaToday	13–16 Nov 2017	497	67.1	27.9	0.8	4.2	0.0	0.0	39.2
Sagalytics Archived	27 Oct–2 Nov 2017	530	66.8	29.0	–	–	–	4.2	37.8
MaltaToday	2–5 Oct 2017	506	67.5	31.9	0.3	0.3	0.0	0.0	35.6
2017 general election	3 Jun 2017	–	55.0	43.7 (FN)		0.8	0.4	0.1	11.4

=== Complete data ===
Polling firm	Fieldwork date	Sample size	PL	PN	PD	AD	MPM	Others	Lead	Not voting	Don't know	No reply
MaltaToday	1–7 March 2022	1,000	37.4	30.0	0.3		–	3.3	7.4	29.0		–
MaltaToday	21 Feb-4 March 2022	1220	37.4	30.0	–		–	0.6	7.4	8.5	20.5	–
MaltaToday	21–26 Feb 2022	597	36.2	30.5	0.1		–	1.1	5.7	9.4	19.1	–
MaltaToday	31 Jan–4 Feb 2022	643	44.1	32.4	1.7		–	0.0	11.7	9.4	11.5	–
MaltaToday	5–12 Jan 2022	647	43.5	28.6	0.9		–	0.6	14.9	10.4	13.9	–
MaltaToday	26 Nov 2021 – 2 Dec 2021	652	45.8	31.9	0.1		–	0.0	13.9	10.3	11.4	–
MaltaToday	28 Oct 2021 – 3 Nov 2021	852	43.3	29.8	0.8		–	0.0	13.5	11.6	13.4	–
MaltaToday	27 Sep 2021 – 6 Oct 2021	647	43.2	27.3	1.6		–	0.0	15.9	12.3	12.4	–
MaltaToday	25 Aug 2021 – 2 Sep 2021	651	43.9	31.1	1.2		–	0.0	12.8	12.4	9.9	–
MaltaToday	28 Jun 2021 – 6 Jul 2021	651	44.9	32.4	1.1		–	0.0	12.5	8.4	12	–
MaltaToday	31 May – 4 Jun 2021	650	45.7	29.3	0.8		–	0.0	16.4	9.4	13.5	–
MaltaToday	3–7 May 2021	649	44.8	30.0	0.5		–	0.0	14.8	11.1	12.2	–
MaltaToday	5–9 Apr 2021	647	41.8	35.6	0.4		–	0.4	6.2	8.1	11.7	–
MaltaToday	1–5 Mar 2021	649	39.2	32.6	1.7		–	0.0	6.6	13.3	11.6	–
MaltaToday	1–5 Feb 2021	649	41.0	32.9	0.6		–	0.0	8.1	12.2	10.6	–
MaltaToday	4–8 Jan 2021	640	42.1	33.6	0.9		–	0.0	8.5	13.3	9.2	–
MaltaToday	30 Nov – 4 Dec 2020	641	42.9	30.3	0.3		–	0.0	12.6	13.8	11.1	–
MaltaToday	2–6 Nov 2020	654	44.2	32.4	0.7		–	0.0	11.8	11.7	10.0	–
MaltaToday	5–9 Oct 2020	654	40.3	30.3	0.9		–	0.0	10.0	12.3	13.9	–
MaltaToday	31 Aug – 4 Sep 2020	655	45.1	23.5	0.4	0.0	–	0.0	21.6	20.3	6.6	–
MaltaToday	13–17 Jul 2020	585	47.8	20.8	0.0	0.7	–	0.0	27.0	20.3	6.6	–
MaltaToday	12–18 Jun 2020	653	45.9	21.7	0.6	1.0	0.0	0.0	24.2	18.2	12.6	–
MaltaToday	11–15 May 2020	653	51.9	22.1	0.1	1.0	0.0	0.0	29.8	10.3	14.5	–
MaltaToday	6–9 Apr 2020	652	49.1	23.3	0.0	0.1	0.0	0.0	25.8	7.2	18.7	–
MaltaToday	3–10 Mar 2020	653	46.0	19.1	N	1.5	0.0	0.0	26.9	18.4	14.1	–
MaltaToday	21–28 Jan 2020	655	49.2	23.8	0.8	0.4	0.0	0.0	25.4	8.1	17.2	–
MaltaToday	24–31 Oct 2019	656	44.4	26.9	0.6	0.6	0.0	0.0	17.5	8.6	17.5	–
MaltaToday	26 Sep – 3 Oct 2019	652	45.3	23.3	1.5	1.5	0.0	0.0	22.0	15.1	14.0	–
2019 EP election	25 May 2019	–	38.0	26.5	1.4	0.5	0.2	3.3	11.5	30.0	–	–
MaltaToday	9–15 May 2019	652	41.3	27.9	0.7	0.3	0.1	1.1	13.4	9.2	18.6	–
MaltaToday	25 Apr – 3 May 2019	602	44.1	29.0	0.8	1.0	0.0	1.2	15.1	9.8	12.4	–
MaltaToday	28 Mar – 4 Apr 2019	597	41.8	25.1	0.0	0.0	0.0	0.0	16.7	13.8	17.3	–
MaltaToday	22–27 Feb 2019	598	42.3	27.3	0.9	0.6	0.0	0.0	15.0	13.9	13.2	–
MaltaToday	21–28 Jan 2019	597	42.0	24.4	0.3	0.4	0.0	0.0	17.6	19.3	12.8	–
MaltaToday	6–14 Dec 2018	597	48.3	29.0	0.9	0.7	0.0	0.0	19.3	12.5	7.1	–
MaltaToday	5–8 Nov 2018	597	47.7	20.2	0.7	0.7	0.0	0.0	27.5	13.8	16.0	–
MaltaToday	1–6 Oct 2018	601	47.3	28.9	0.4	1.8	0.0	0.0	18.4	17.6	4.0	–
MaltaToday	27–30 Aug 2018	605	47.7	24.8	1.3	0.2	0.0	0.0	22.9	16.3	9.7	–
MaltaToday	27 Jul – 2 Aug 2018	597	52.0	27.0	0.0	0.5	0.0	0.0	25.0	10.6	9.7	–
Esprimi	26 – 27 Jul 2018	1,100	46.8	16.5	–	2.5	–	5.7	30.3	16.3	12.1	0.0
MaltaToday	28–31 May 2018	552	48.8	27.6	0.4	0.6	0.0	0.0	21.2	12.0	10.7	–
MaltaToday	23–27 Apr 2018	553	45.8	32.1	0.0	0.7	0.3	0.0	13.7	10.4	10.8	–
MaltaToday	26 Feb – 1 Mar 2018	501	49.6	25.9	2.1	0.8	0.0	0.0	23.7	11.1	10.6	–
Sagalytics	12–20 Feb 2018	600	46.6	28.9	–	–	–	1.5	17.7	6.5	4.2	12.3
MaltaToday	23–29 Jan 2018	501	42.0	28.9	0.0	1.2	0.0	0.0	13.1	10.3	17.4	0.2
MaltaToday	13–16 Nov 2017	497	49.8	20.7	0.6	3.1	0.0	0.0	29.1	15.7	6.5	3.6
Sagalytics Archived	27 Oct – 2 Nov 2017	530	51.4	22.3	–	–	–	3.2	29.1	14.0	9.1	
MaltaToday	2–5 Oct 2017	506	46.4	21.9	0.2	0.2	0.0	0.0	24.5	16.7	12.9	1.7
2017 general election	3 Jun 2017	–	50.0	39.7 (FN)		0.8	0.3	0.1	10.3	7.9	–	–

=== Preferred prime minister ===
==== Abela and Grech ====
Polling firm	Fieldwork date	Sample size	Abela PL	Grech PN	Neither / None	Don't know	No reply	Other
Sagalytics	13 Mar 2022	N/A	55.6	34.4	9.5	–	5.4	–
Times of Malta	14–24 Feb 2022	600	55.3	17.3	17.2	–	10.2	–
MaltaToday	28 Jun–6 Jul 2021	651	51.6	30.4	14.6	3.3	–	–
MaltaToday	31 May–4 Jun 2021	650	50.4	29.3	16.7	3.5	–	–
MaltaToday	3–7 May 2021	649	49.6	25.7	18.1	6.6	–	–
MaltaToday	5–9 Apr 2021	647	47.2	35.8	10.3	6.8	–	–
MaltaToday	1–5 Mar 2021	649	39.8	34.8	18.9	6.5	–	–
MaltaToday	1–5 Feb 2021	649	41.7	35.1	14.0	9.1	–	–
MaltaToday	4–8 Jan 2021	640	42.1	34.7	19.1	4.1	–	–
MaltaToday	30 Nov–4 Dec 2020	641	46.8	30.1	17.6	5.5	–	–
MaltaToday	2–6 Nov 2020	654	48.4	31.5	16.1	3.9	–	–
MaltaToday	5–9 Oct 2020	654	46.6	30.9	13.0	9.4	–	–
MaltaToday	31 Aug–4 Sep 2020	655	51.7	32.1	11.6	4.6	–	–

==== Abela and Delia ====
Polling firm	Fieldwork date	Sample size	Abela PL	Delia PN	Neither / None	Don't know	No reply	Other
MaltaToday	31 Aug–4 Sep 2020	655	56.0	12.0	29.7	2.4	–	–
MaltaToday	13–17 Jul 2020	585	57.7	13.2	26.2	3.0	–	–
MaltaToday	6–9 Apr 2020	652	62.4	17.3	12.8	7.4	–	–
MaltaToday	3–10 Mar 2020	653	55.9	16.5	23.4	4.1	–	–
MaltaToday	21–28 Jan 2020	655	62.5	13.5	16.6	7.4	–	–

==== Muscat and Delia ====
Polling firm	Fieldwork date	Sample size	Muscat PL	Delia PN	Neither / None	Don't know	No reply	Other
MaltaToday	24–31 Oct 2019	656	50.5	21.3	25.4	2.8	–	–
MaltaToday	26 Sep–3 Oct 2019	652	54.1	16.7	26.0	3.3	–	–
MaltaToday	25 June–1 Jul 2019	653	52.6	15.8	28.5	3.0	–	–
MaltaToday	9–15 May 2019	849	50.6	22.8	23.2	3.4	–	–
MaltaToday	25 Apr–3 May 2019	602	51.7	21.2	22.7	4.3	–	–
MaltaToday	28 Mar–4 Apr 2019	597	49.6	21.5	23.9	5.0	–	–
MaltaToday	22–27 Feb 2019	598	54.8	15.9	24.6	4.7	–	–
MaltaToday	21–28 Jan 2019	597	54.8	20.4	20.0	4.9	–	–
MaltaToday	6–14 Dec 2018	597	51.2	24.7	21.2	2.8	–	–
MaltaToday	5–8 Nov 2018	597	54.5	17.8	23.1	4.6	–	–
MaltaToday	1–6 Oct 2018	601	52.9	19.8	24.3	3.1	–	–
MaltaToday	27–30 Aug 2018	605	53.5	17.9	1.6	27.1	–	–
MaltaToday	27 Jul–2 Aug 2018	597	53.9	14.8	10.8	20.5	–	–
Sagalytics Archived	Jun 2018	?	62.8	36.6	–	–	–	–
MaltaToday	28–31 May 2018	552	52.6	23.5	20.7	3.2	–	–
MaltaToday	23–27 Apr 2018	553	48.6	27.2	18.8	5.4	–	–
MaltaToday	26 Feb–1 Mar 2018	501	58.2	20.2	22.1	5.1	–	–
Sagalytics	12–20 Feb 2018	600	47.5	22.6	0.6	11.9	16.2	1.1
MaltaToday	23–29 Jan 2018	501	41.0	15.4	15.2	28.3	–	–
MaltaToday	6–14 Dec 2017	488	50.4	7.2	24.2	18.3	–	–
MaltaToday	13–16 Nov 2017	497	53.7	15.2	3.1	27.5	0.5	–
MaltaToday	2–5 Oct 2017	506	50.9	22.1	16.6	10.0	0.5	–
