= Timothy Alden =

Timothy Alden may refer to:

- Timothy Alden (educator), educator and Christian clergyman, founder of Allegheny College
- Timothy Alden (politician), Maltese environmental activist and politician
- Timothy Alden (inventor), American inventor
