= Inglott =

Inglott is a surname. Notable people with this surname include: .

- Anton Inglott (1915–1945), Maltese painter.
- Wenceslao Benítez Inglott (1879–1955), Spanish navy officer, scientist, and engineer. Director of the Naval Military Academy and of the Royal Institute and Observatory of the Spanish Navy.
- Rafael Acosta Inglott (1889–1941), Professor of Law at the universities of Oviedo and Granada and mayor of the Spanish city of Granada (1940–1941).
- Cayetano Bernardo Inglott y Durán (1795–1875), Businessman and the seventh mayor of the Spanish city of Las Palmas de Gran Canaria (1835–1837).
- Peter Serracino Inglott (1936–2012), Rector of the University of Malta, linguist and author.
- Jerome Inglott (1776–1835), Maltese philosopher and theologian.
- William Inglott (1553–1621), English organist and composer.
- Martin Cauchi Inglott (born 1967), Maltese senior retired Armed Forces of Malta officer, diplomat and the current secretary general of the Democratic Party.
