= Timothy Alden (politician) =

Maltese politician

Leader of the Democratic Party
- In office 22 September 2019 – 3 August 2020
- Preceded by: Godfrey Farrugia
- Succeeded by: Title Abolished

Personal details
- Born: Swieqi, Malta
- Party: Democratic Party (2016 until 2020); AD+PD (2020–present)
- Occupation: Politician, environmental activist

Timothy Alden (born 1991) is a Maltese environmental activist and former politician, and was the last leader of the Democratic Party before it merged with Democratic Alternative to create AD+PD.

== Early life ==
Timothy Alden was born in Swieqi in 1991. He spent many years in Germany at a young age. He currently lives in Naxxar.

In 2016 he graduated jointly with both a Bachelors and Masters in International Management and Intercultural Studies. He attained his degrees respectively from the University of Stirling and the University of Passau.

Upon returning to Malta from his studies, Alden was in talks with the President of Malta to encourage the creation of a Maltese language course on Duolingo.

== Environmental activism and political candidacy ==
Alden's environmental activism began through his work with the NGO, Flimkien għal Ambjent Aħjar. His first engagement with the NGO saw it present an open letter to the Prime Minister, demanding that the overdevelopment of the country be remedied. Through FAA he also organised the 75th Anniversary of Operation Pedestal. In the 2017 Maltese general elections, he agreed to contest with the Democratic Party as part of the Forza Nazzjonali alliance, contesting the 8th and 9th Districts. He believed that a third party was the only way to bring about desperately needed reform. Although the government retained its power after the election, the Democratic Party elected two members to Parliament, becoming the first third party to do since before the Independence of Malta. Wanting the party to evolve beyond its association with her own image, Marlene Farrugia resigned from the post of party leader in August 2017.

In the resulting leadership race, Timothy Alden contested the post against Anthony Buttigieg, believing the Democratic Party to be the vehicle for the greatest positive change in Maltese political history. Timothy Alden stated his belief in the need for constitutional reform, an end to tribalism and a more inclusive society. During the contest, he organised a clean-up of St. George's Bay and invited Anthony Buttigieg. Due to the fact he was not yet ready to step down from his practical and bread-winning professional obligations in Flimkien għal Ambjent Aħjar, however, Timothy Alden decided to remove himself from the leadership contest, and supported the leadership bid of Anthony Buttigieg as his deputy leader.

== Deputy Leader ==
As deputy leader, Timothy Alden participated in a delegation to meet the Alliance of Liberals and Democrats for Europe Party in Amsterdam. The Democratic Party was then accepted as a full member of ALDE.

The Democratic Party's first major test came when the government attempted to extend the hunting hours of Majjistral Park, in collusion with the Nationalist Party under its new leader, Adrian Delia. The Democratic Party resisted this move in Parliament, acting as the first Parliamentary party to stand up to the hunting lobby. Noticing the vacancy left open by the Nationalist Party in Malta's Commission Against Corruption, the Democratic Party would also nominate its own candidate, Philip Micallef, to the post. These stands in favour of the environment and good governance led to Alden declaring that the Democratic Party was dictating the agenda in Parliament. The Democratic Party would also blow the whistle and raise resistance against an MP pensions reform bill, claiming that Parliamentarians should not be entitled to more public money until the country's other problems were taken care of. The Democratic Party was then able to claim victory against this bill, when the government and Nationalist Party backtracked on the proposal.

Alden was part of the Democratic Party's first delegation to San Anton Palace to discuss Constitutional reform with President Marie-Louise Coleiro Preca, a process kickstarted by a visit to Malta by the Venice Commission. In a statement, Alden said that the Institutional System, the political system and public administration are not working in the way they should be in a modern democratic country.

He would then lead two subsequent delegations to meet with the Steering Committee for Constitutional Reform. The second meeting took place on 7 January 2019, and the Democratic Party argued that the process of Constitutional reform should not be limited to the remit of the Steering Committee, but should instead transform into a full convention with broad participation and decision-making powers delegated to representatives of the general public.

Alden led a third meeting to the committee where it was argued that the Constitution required the implementation of a rule of law control system, to empower the Constitutional Court, that the President be chosen by a two-thirds majority and that timeframes and terms of reference be established for the work of the steering committee.

Upon the resignation of Marlene Farrugia and Godfrey Farrugia from Partit Demokratiku, Timothy Alden insisted that he would remain loyal to the party, and that the Executive would meet to discuss the best way forward. On 25 September, during an Executive meeting, Alden appointed a negotiating team to discuss a merger with the Democratic Alternative. On 28 December, the anniversary of the murder of Karin Grech, Timothy Alden and Carmel Cacopardo announced that talks for the two parties to merge were at an advanced stage.

On the lead up to the merger, Timothy Alden helped set up the new Executive Committee of ADŻ (Alternattiva Demokratika Żgħażagħ), nominating Giosue Agius to the role of co-chairperson.

== Platform ==
In April 2018, Alden would be one of the first to take an open and direct public stand against the system of clientelism which reigns in Malta, whereby each Ministry has a "customer care department". The existence of these departments was confessed by a government Minister. Alden received a phone call at his household in which a Ministry offered favours to the family, implying an attempt to buy their vote. Alden responded by writing a letter to the Commissioner of Police and later filed a report to the Police. Alden then went on to report the situation to the Commission Against Corruption when the Police took no action. He succeeded in stirring public debate about clientelism and others stepped forward to speak against it.

He has been a strong advocate for the government to buy the remaining gardens, fields and other green enclaves in Malta's towns and villages, so as to convert them into public spaces.

Alden has also been campaigning for alternative means of transportation.

For ALDE's annual congress in 2018, Timothy Alden led a delegation to Madrid. The delegation included Dr. Anthony Buttigieg. During the congress, the Democratic Party ensured that the section of the ALDE manifesto dealing with defence was in line with Malta's constitution, which states that Malta is a neutral country. Alden also advocated a more pro-active approach to good governance reform in the EU.

Alden accompanied Godfrey Farrugia in a meeting with the President of Malta, Marie-Louise Coleiro Preca, an hour before the two major parties, to discuss the potential roadmap to Constitutional reform.

Alden has also been advocating the further development of women's rights and improving their representation in politics. However, he is against gender quotas in Parliament, believing instead in the empowerment of women based on merit and the provision of equality of opportunity.

== Leader ==
Timothy Alden was elected as leader of the party during the party's AGM on 6 July 2020. He previously served as interim leader following the resignation of Godfrey Farrugia. His pledge as leader was to unite Partit Demokratiku with Alternattiva Demokratika by August. The two parties signed a memorandum of understanding to merge on 1 August after nearly a year of negotiations. On 17 October, the two parties finally completed the merger process, and created AD+PD. His job done, Timothy Alden then retired from active political life due to professional, personal and academic demands.
