= AD+PD =

Political party in Malta

- Secretary-General: Carmel Cacopardo (acting)
- Governing body: Executive Committee
- Chairperson: Sandra Gauci
- Co-Deputy Chairpersons: Carmel Cacopardo; Mina Tolu
- Founders: Timothy Alden; Carmel Cacopardo
- Founded: 17 October 2020
- Merger of: Democratic Alternative; Democratic Party
- Think tank: Fondazzjoni Ceratonia
- Youth wing: Kollettiv Żgħażagħ EkoXellugin
- Ideology: Green politics; Progressivism
- Political position: Centre-left
- European affiliation: European Green Party
- International affiliation: Global Greens
- Colours: Yellow; Green; Orange
- House of Representatives: 0 / 67
- European Parliament: 0 / 6
- Mayors of Localities: 0 / 68
- Local Council Seats: 1 / 462 (Note: Ralph Cassar sits on the Attard local council but is temporarily suspended from the party.)

Website
- adpd.mt

AD+PD (Note: Alternattiva Demokratika+Partit Demokratiku (Democratic Alternative+Democratic Party)), also written as ADPD and sometimes referred to as ADPD – The Green Party, is a green and progressive political party in Malta. The party was founded on 17 October 2020 by a merger of the two most prominent third parties in Malta, the green Democratic Alternative (AD) and the social liberal Democratic Party (PD).

== History ==
Talks of unification started in September 2019 by the leaders of both parties and were announced in December 2019, when both parties met up next to the memorial of Karin Grech in San Ġwann. "I had long argued for the consolidation of third party politics into the new movement the country needs" stated Timothy Alden, then leader of PD. AD Chairman Carmel Cacopardo had stated that both parties had agreed on broad strokes in principle and were working together to move forward with the movement.

In a joint article published in The Malta Independent, Timothy Alden and Carmel Cacopardo stated that AD and PD had developed on the basis of dissent against power; both parties having been formed as acts of rebellion against injustices in the Labour Party. They stated that they shared a determination to address important issues which others conveniently try to ignore, and that over the years it had been AD and PD who had been at the forefront of the struggle for a better environment, good governance, transparency and accountability.

The party was officially announced as "AD+PD" on the 1 August 2020 when both parties met and signed an agreement to begin the merger process. From then on both parties promised to function as a single entity with a transition team. On 17 October 2020, both parties merged into a single party under a transitional executive, in preparation for the first annual general meeting to be held in May 2021.

In August 2023, the party's youth wing voted to change its name from ADŻ Green Youth to Kollettiv Żgħażagħ EkoXellugin (Collective of Young EcoLeftists).

AD+PD elected two councillors, party leader Gauci and general secretary Ralph Cassar in the 2024 local elections in the localities of Saint Paul's Bay and Attard respectively.

On 2 November 2025, AD+PD's general secretary Ralph Cassar was suspended both from his internal post and as a councillor for AD+PD over allegations of sexual harassment and inappropriate conduct.

In March 2026, Gauci announced that the party was in talks with former AD leader Arnold Cassola and his recently-formed Momentum party to join forces for the upcoming general election.

== Election results ==
=== House of Representatives ===
Election	Leader	Votes	%	Seats	+/−	Rank	Status
2022	Carmel Cacopardo	4,747	1.61	0 / 79	New	3rd	Extra-parliamentary
2026	Sandra Gauci	3,996	1.31	0 / 67	0	4th	Extra-parliamentary

=== European Parliament ===
Election	Leader	Votes	%	Seats	+/−	Rank	EP Group
2024	Sandra Gauci	3,109	1.19	0 / 6	New	4th	–

=== Local Councils ===
Election	Leader	Votes	%	Seats	+/−	Rank
2024	Sandra Gauci	2,124	0.82	2 / 471	New	3rd
