= Inglot =

Inglot is a surname. Notable people with this surname include:

- Bill Inglot, American music engineer
- Dominic Inglot, English tennis player
- Jacek Inglot, Polish writer
- Stefan Inglot, Polish historian
- Wojciech Inglot, Polish businessman, founder of Inglot Cosmetics

== See also ==
- Inglott
- Englot
- Inglett
