= Politics of Malta =

Politics of Malta Politika ta' Malta
- Coat of arms of Malta
- Polity type: Unitary parliamentary republic
- Constitution: Constitution of Malta

Legislative branch
- Name: Parliament of Malta
- Type: Unicameral
- Meeting place: Parliament House

Executive branch
- Head of state
- Title: President
- Currently: Myriam Spiteri Debono
- Head of government
- Title: Prime Minister
- Currently: Robert Abela
- Appointer: President
- Cabinet
- Name: Cabinet of Malta
- Current cabinet: Maltese Government 2022–2027
- Leader: Prime Minister

Judicial branch
- Name: Judiciary of Malta
- Constitutional Court

The politics of Malta takes place within a framework of a parliamentary representative democratic republic, whereby the president of Malta is the constitutional head of state. Executive authority is vested in the president of Malta, with the general direction and control of the Government of Malta remaining with the prime minister of Malta, who is the head of government and the cabinet. Legislative power is vested in the Parliament of Malta, which consists of the president of Malta and the unicameral House of Representatives of Malta with the speaker as the presiding officer of the legislative body. Judicial power remains with the chief justice and the judiciary of Malta. Since independence, the party electoral system has been dominated by the Christian democratic Nationalist Party (Partit Nazzjonalista) and the social democratic Labour Party (Partit Laburista).

The Economist Intelligence Unit rated Malta a "flawed democracy" in 2022.

== Political developments since independence ==
Since independence on 1964, two parties have dominated Malta's polarized and evenly divided politics during this period: the centre-right Nationalist Party and the centre-left Labour Party. From the pre-independence 1962 general election until 2017, third parties failed to score any electoral success. In the 2013 election, the Democratic Alternative (a green party established in 1989) managed to secure only 1.8% of the first preference votes nationwide.

The 1996 elections resulted in the election of the Labour Party, by 8,000 votes, to replace the Nationalists, who had won in 1987 and 1992. Voter turnout was characteristically high at 96%, with the Labour Party receiving 50.72%, the Nationalist Party 47.8%, the Democratic Alternative 1.46%, and independent candidates 0.02%.

In 1998, the Labour Party's loss in a parliamentary vote led the prime minister to call an early election. The Nationalist Party was returned to office in September 1998 by a majority of 13,000 votes, holding a five-seat majority in Parliament. Voter turnout was 95%, with the Nationalist Party receiving 51.81%, the Labour Party 46.97%, the Democratic Alternative 1.21%, and independent candidates 0.01%.

By the end of 2002 the Nationalist government wrapped up negotiations for European Union membership. A referendum on the issue was called in March 2003, for which the Nationalists and the Democratic Alternative campaigned for a "yes" vote while Labour campaigned heavily for "no" vote, invalidate their vote or abstain. Turnout was 91%, with more than 53% voting "yes".

The Labour Party argued that the "yes" votes amounted to less than 50% of the overall votes, hence, and citing the 1956 Maltese United Kingdom integration referendum as an example, they claimed that the "yes" had not in fact won the referendum. The then MLP Leader Alfred Sant said that the general election which was to be held within a month would settle the affair. In the general elections the Nationalists were returned to office with 51.79% of the vote to Labour's 47.51%. The Democratic Alternative polled 0.68%. The Nationalists were thus able to form a government and sign and ratify the EU Accession Treaty on 16 April 2003.

On 1 May 2004 Malta joined the EU and on 1 January 2008, the Eurozone with the euro as the national currency. The first elections after membership were held in March 2008 resulting in a narrow victory for the Nationalist Party with 49.34% of first preference votes. In May 2011, a nationwide referendum was held on the introduction of divorce. This was the first time in the history of parliament that Parliament approved a motion originating outside from the Cabinet.

In March 2013, the Labour Party returned to government after fifteen years in opposition with a record-breaking lead of 36,000 votes leading to the resignation of the Nationalist leader Lawrence Gonzi, and Joseph Muscat became prime minister. In June 2017, the Labour Party called in a snap election on its May Day celebrations and increased its vote disparity to around 40,000 votes. The then leader of the opposition, Simon Busuttil, announced his resignation shortly thereafter. This election saw the first third party elected to Malta's Parliament since independence, with the election of Marlene Farrugia in the 10th District representing the Democratic Party. Joseph Muscat continued to be prime minister In January 2020, he stepped down after the 2019 Malta political crisis surrounding the car bombing of investigative journalist Daphne Caruana Galizia. Robert Abela - the son of Malta's former president George Abela - elected a new leader of Labour Party and new prime minister of Malta in January 2020.

Democratic Alternative and the Democratic Party merged into a new party, AD+PD, on 17 October 2020.

In March 2022, the ruling Labour party, led by Prime Minister Robert Abela, won its third successive election. It gained even bigger victory than in 2013 and in 2017.

== Executive branch ==
Under its 1964 constitution, Malta became a parliamentary democracy within the Commonwealth. Queen Elizabeth II of the United Kingdom was sovereign of Malta, and a governor-general exercised executive authority on her behalf, while the actual direction and control of the government and the nation's affairs were in the hands of the cabinet under the leadership of a Maltese prime minister.

On December 13, 1974, the constitution was revised, and Malta became a republic within the Commonwealth, with executive authority vested in the president of Malta, which can be exercised directly or through officers subordinate to him. The president is elected by the House of Representatives for a five-year term. They appoint as prime minister the leader of the party with a majority of seats in the unicameral House of Representatives, known in Maltese as Kamra tar-Rappreżentanti.

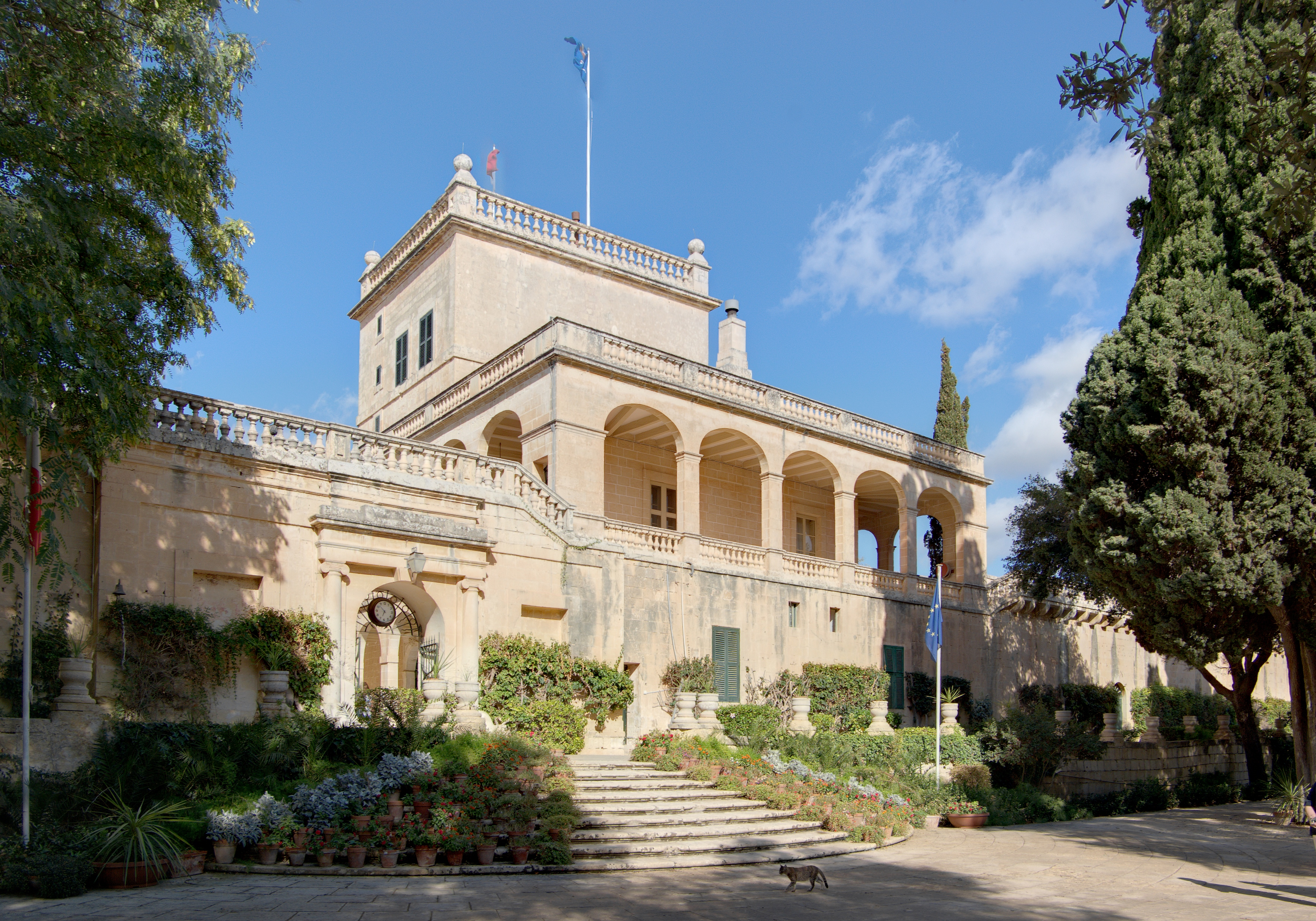
San Anton Palace in Attard serves as the official residence of the president of Malta

The president also nominally appoints, upon recommendation of the prime minister, the individual ministers. Ministers are selected from among the members of the House of Representatives, which usually consists of 65 members unless bonus seats are given to a party which gains an absolute majority of votes but not a parliamentary majority. Elections must be held at least every five years and the electoral system used is single transferable vote.

=== Administrative divisions ===
Malta is divided into 68 elected local councils, with each council responsible for the administration of cities or regions of varying sizes. Administrative responsibility is distributed between the local councils and the central government in Valletta. The Local Councils Act, 1993 (Act XV of 1993), was published on June 30, 1993, subdividing Malta into 54 local councils in Malta and 14 in Gozo. The inhabitants who are registered elect the Council every three years, as voters in the Local Councils' Electoral Register. Elections are held by means of the system of proportional representation using the single transferable vote. The mayor is the head of the Local Council and the representative of the Council for all effects under the Act. The executive secretary, who is appointed by the Council, is the executive, administrative, and financial head of the Council. All decisions are taken collectively with the other members of the Council. Local councils are responsible for the general upkeep and embellishment of the locality, local wardens, and refuse collection, and carry out general administrative duties for the central government such as collection of government rents and funds, and answering government-related public inquiries.

There are also Administrative Committees elected with responsibility for smaller regions.

== Legislative branch ==
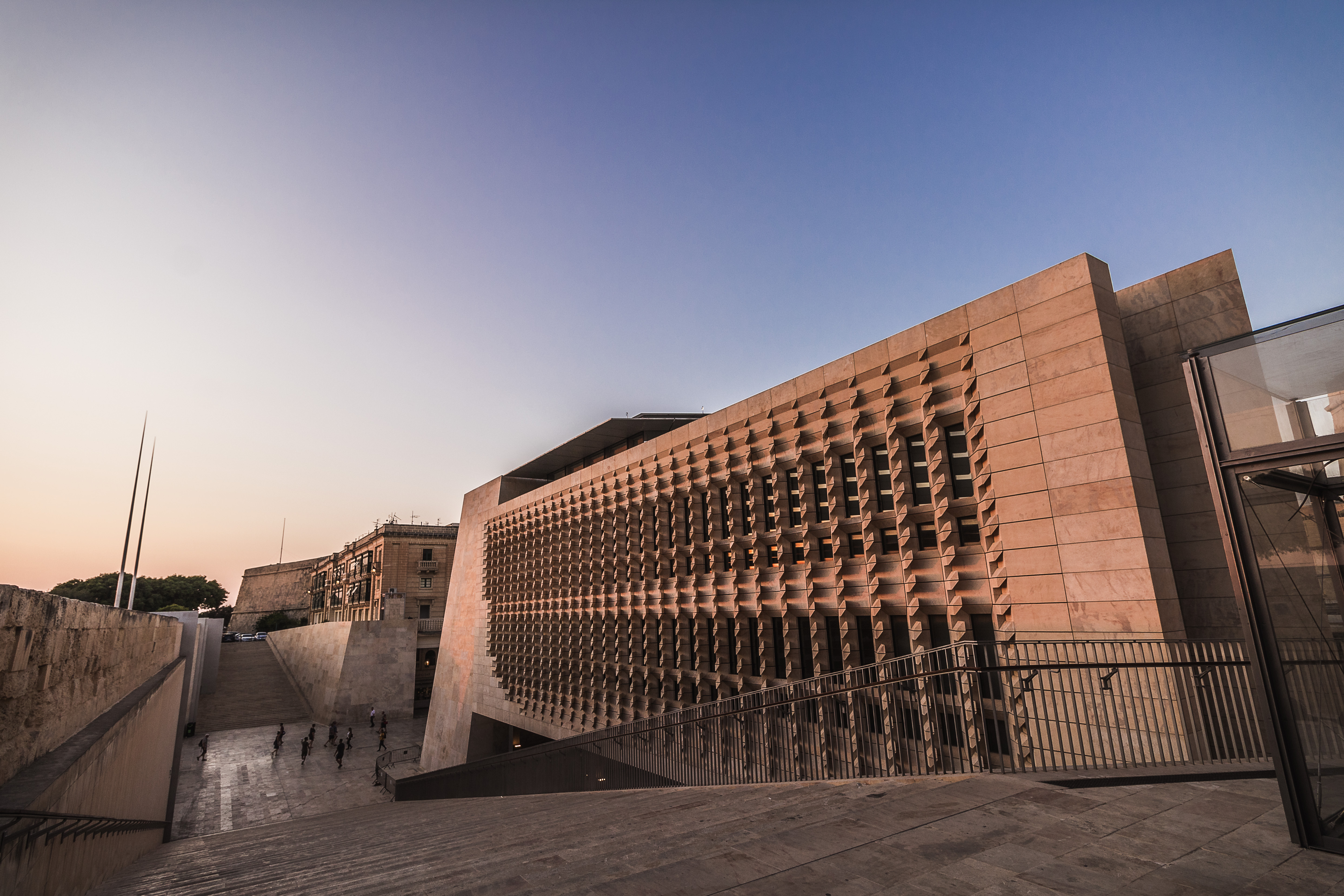
The Parliament House in Valletta

Elections to the House of Representatives (Kamra tad-Deputati) are based on the single transferable vote system, a variant of the proportional representation electoral system. First, vacancies are filled through casual election and subsequent vacancies through co-option, meaning that no by-elections are held between one general election and the other. The parliamentary term cannot exceed five years.

Ordinarily, 65 members are elected to the House from 13 multi-seat constituencies each returning 5 MPs. Additional MPs are elected in two circumstances:

- When a party achieves 50%+1 of first-preference valid votes in the election but does not secure a parliamentary majority it is awarded enough seats (filled by the best runner-up candidates) to make a parliamentary majority
- When in an election contested by more than two parties only two parties are elected to Parliament and the relative parliamentary strength is not proportionate to the first preference votes obtained, additional seats are allocated to establish proportionality

A third electoral amendment has been enacted which guarantees strict-proportionality with respect to votes and seats to parliamentary political groups.

== Political party standings as of the most recent election ==
Voting stations were opened from 07:00 to 22:00, and in total, there were 355,075 citizens that had the right to vote in the general election. The turnout at 14:00 was reported at 44.8%, which was eight points lower than in 2017. According to the Electoral Commission of Malta, a total of 304,050 citizens voted, which made it the lowest turnout since the 1955 election. In addition to the 65 regularly elected members, two seats were awarded to the Nationalist Party to restore proportionality between votes obtained and parliamentary representation and twelve more women were appointed (six for each of the parties with elected members) to comply with the gender-corrective mechanism.

Parliament of Malta
Party	Votes	%	Seats	+/–
Labour Party	162,707	55.11	44	+7
Nationalist Party	123,233	41.74	35	+7
AD+PD	4,747	1.61	0	−2
People's Party	1,533	0.52	0	New
ABBA	1,364	0.46	0	New
Volt Malta	382	0.13	0	New
Independents	1,282	0.43	0	0
Total	295,248	100.00	79	+12
Valid votes	295,248	97.11		
Invalid/blank votes	8,802	2.89		
Total votes	304,050	100.00		
Registered voters/turnout	355,075	85.63		
Source: Electoral Commission

== Judicial branch ==
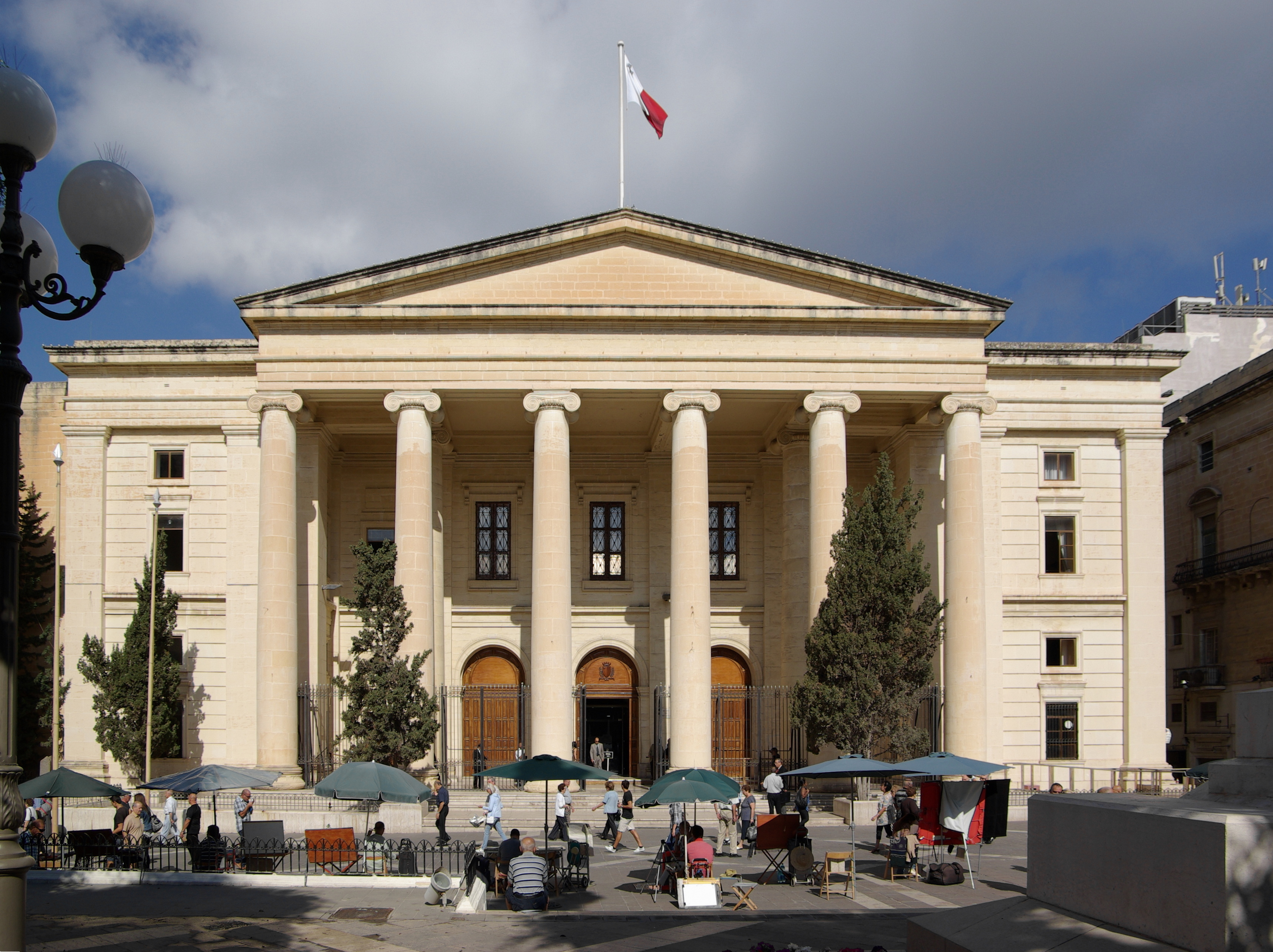
The Courts of Justice building in Valletta

The judicial system in Malta comprises inferior courts, civil and criminal courts of appeal, and a Constitutional Court. Inferior courts are presided over by magistrates which have original jurisdiction in criminal and civil actions. In the criminal courts, the presiding judge sits with a jury of nine. The Court of Appeal and the Court of Criminal Appeal hear appeals from decisions of the civil and criminal actions respectively.

The highest court, the Constitutional Court, has both original and appellate jurisdiction. In its appellate jurisdiction it adjudicates cases involving violations of human rights and interpretation of the Constitution. It can also perform judicial review. In its original jurisdiction it has jurisdiction over disputed parliamentary elections and electoral corrupt practices.

There is a legal aid scheme offered to citizens lacking the means to afford legal defence.

According to the Constitution, the president appoints the chief justice of Malta acting in accordance with a resolution of the House supported by the votes of not less than two-thirds of all the members of the House of Representatives. The judges of the Superior Court and the magistrates of the inferior courts are appointed through the Judicial Appointments Committee of Malta.

Guarantees for the independence of the judiciary include the security of tenure for judges until their retiring age set at 65 (with a choice to extend retirement till 68), or until impeachment. The impeachment procedure for judges foresees a removal decision of the president upon request by the Commission for the Administration for Justice.

The independence of the judiciary is also guaranteed by the constitutional requirement that the judges’ salaries are paid from the Consolidated Fund and thus the government may not diminish or amend them to their prejudice.

The Maltese system is considered in line with the principles of separation of powers and of independence of the judiciary. However, in its pre-accession evaluation reports, the European Commission has suggested in 2003 the need to reform the procedure for appointment of the members of the judiciary, currently "controlled by political bodies" (i.e. the Parliament and parties therein), in order to improve its objectivity. The Commission has also pointed to the need to check the compliance of the procedure for challenging judges and magistrates provided for by Article 738 of the Code of Organisation and Civil Procedure with the principle of an impartial tribunal enshrined in the European Convention on Human Rights.

== International organization participation ==
Malta is a member of the Commonwealth of Nations, CE, EBRD, ECE, EU (member from 1 May 2004), FAO, IAEA, IBRD, ICAO, ICCt, ICFTU, ICRM, IFAD, IFRCS, ILO, IMF, IMO, Inmarsat, Intelsat, Interpol, IOC, IOM, ISO, ITU, OPCW, OSCE, PCA, UN, UNCTAD, UNESCO, UNIDO, UPU, WCL, WCO, WHO, WIPO, WMO, WToO, WTrO

Malta was a long-time member of the Non-Aligned Movement. It ceased to be part of the movement when it joined the European Union.

== See also ==
- Nationalist Party
- Labour Party
- People's Party
- Volt Malta
- Mass meeting
