= 2017 Maltese general election =

- 3 June 2017

All seats in the House of Representatives
- Turnout: 92.06%
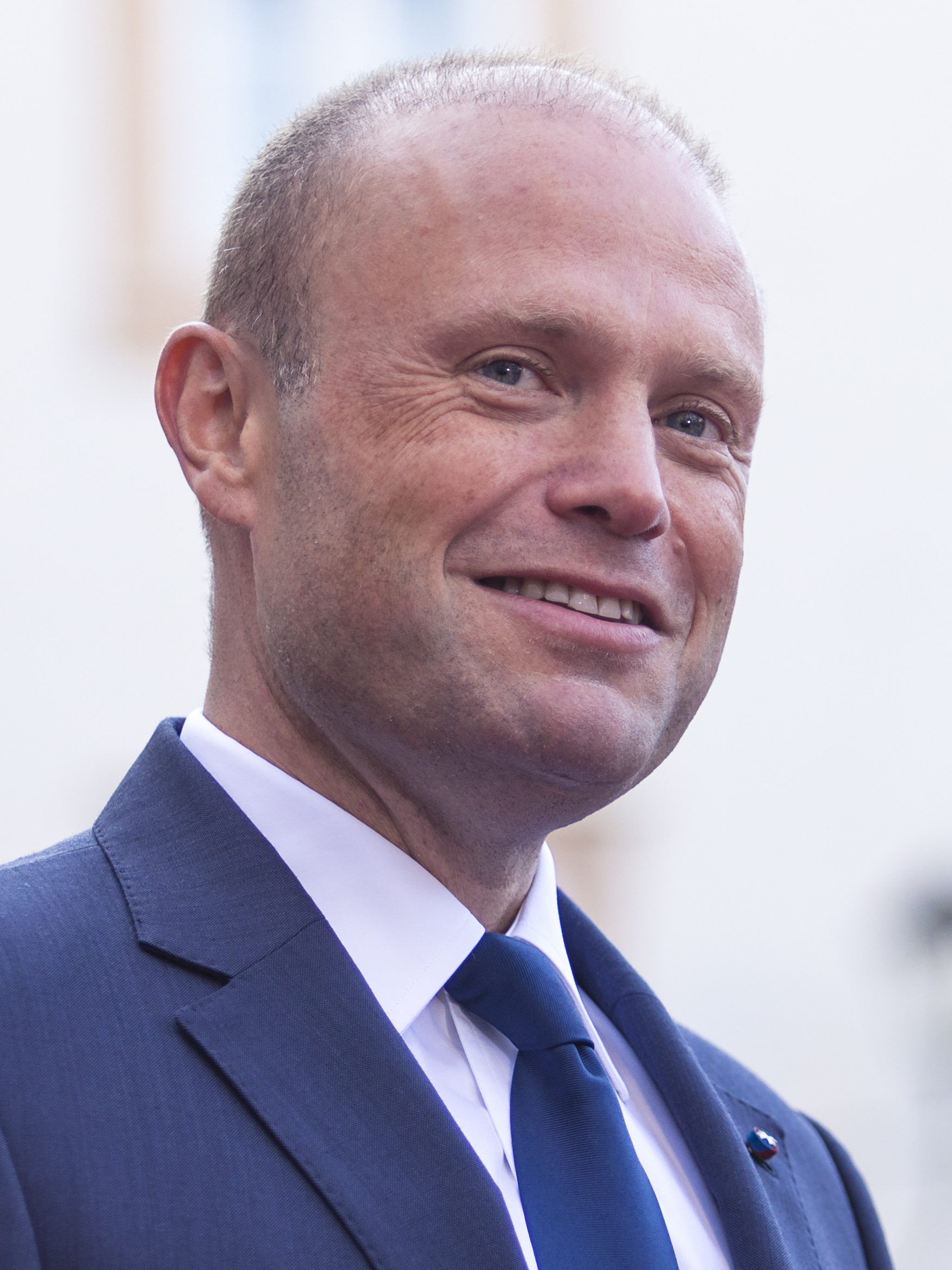

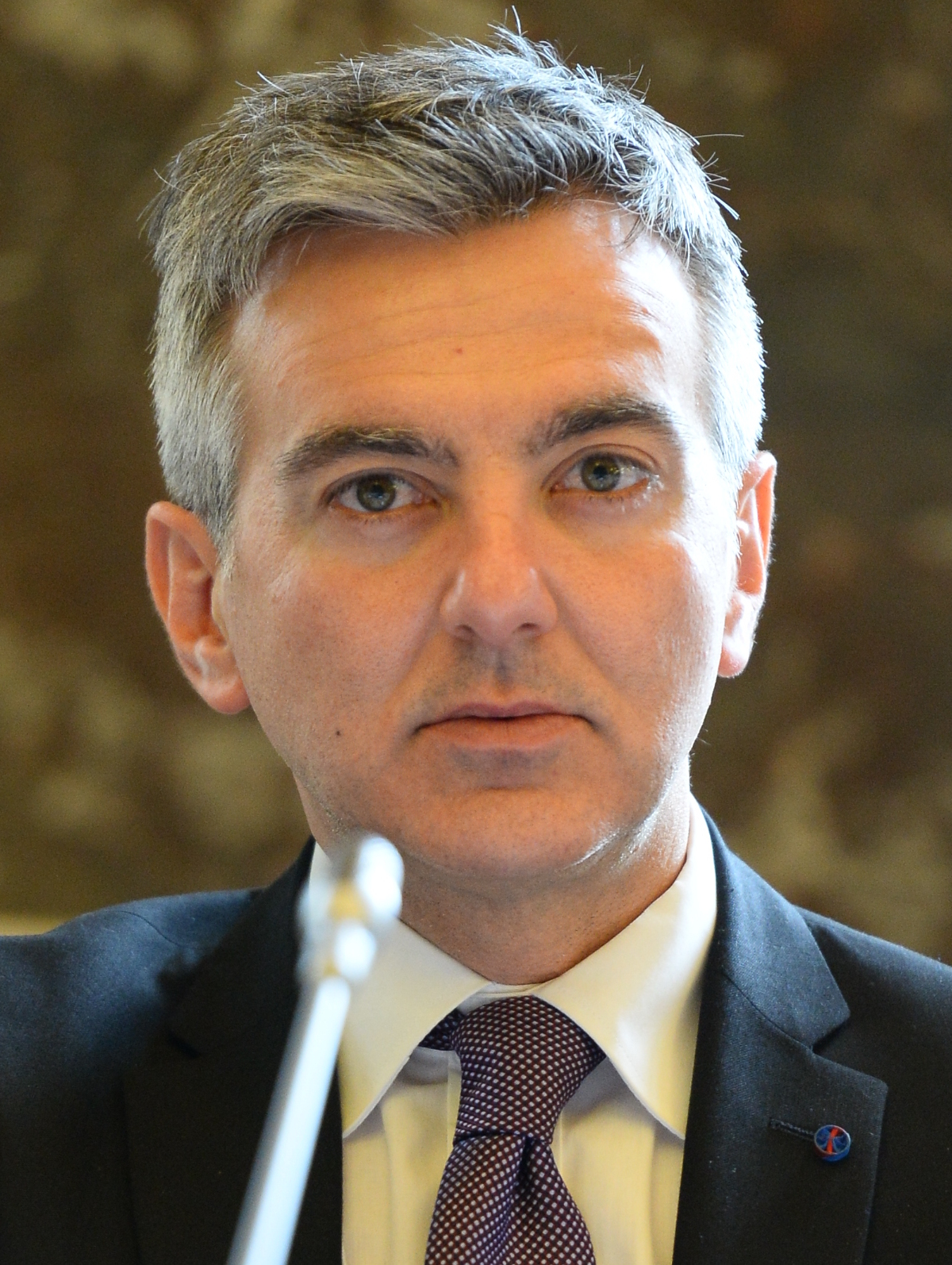
	First party	Second party
Leader	Joseph Muscat	Simon Busuttil
Party	Labour	Forza Nazzjonali (PN–PD)
Last election	54.83%, 39 seats	43.34%, 30 seats
Seats won	37	30
Seat change	▼2	Steady
Popular vote	170,976	135,696
Percentage	55.04%	43.68%
Swing	▲0.21pp	▲0.34pp
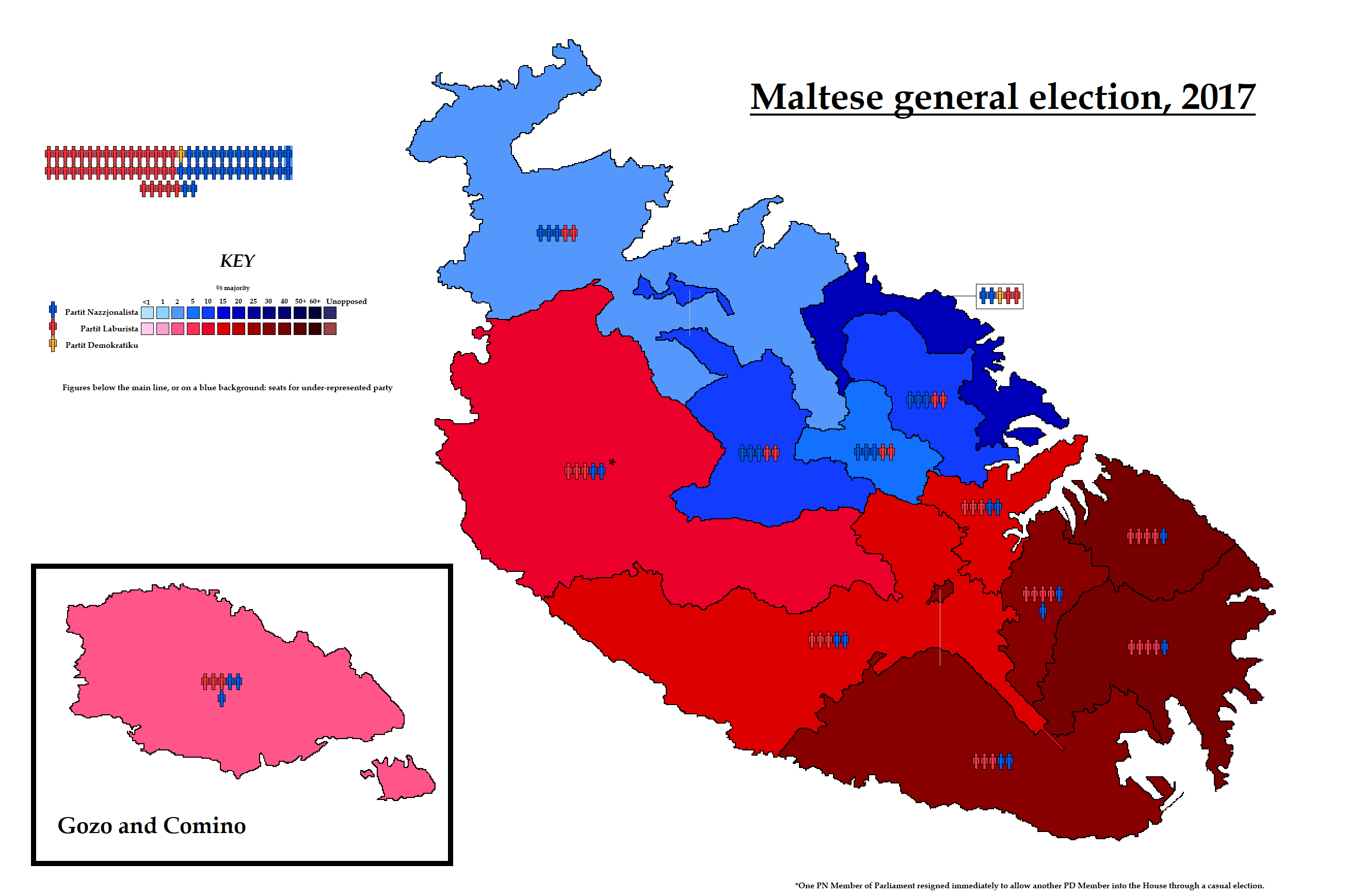
Prime Minister before election
Joseph Muscat
Labour Party
Elected Prime Minister
Joseph Muscat
Labour Party

General elections were held in Malta on Saturday, 3 June 2017 to elect all members of the House of Representatives. The elections were contested by the Labour Party, led by Prime Minister Joseph Muscat, the Nationalist Party, led by opposition leader Simon Busuttil, and four other parties, making it the elections with most parties participating since 1962.

The Labour Party won a second term in government for the first time since 1976, receiving 55% of the vote, the highest share since 1955. Voter turnout was 92%, down 1pp from 2013.

== Background ==
The previous general elections were held on Saturday, 9 March 2013. The Labour Party, led by Muscat, defeated the incumbent Nationalist Party of Lawrence Gonzi in a landslide victory, taking 39 seats in the House of Representatives, against 30 for the Nationalist Party. However, on 5 February 2015 the Constitutional Court ordered two additional seats to be given to the Nationalist Party, increasing the total number of seats to 71. The Labour Party then lost a seat when Marlene Farrugia resigned from the Labour parliamentary group, to later form the Democratic Party.

Following the defeat, Gonzi stepped down as leader of the Nationalists, with Simon Busuttil taking his place on 13 May.

Muscat was sworn in as the new Prime Minister on 11 March. The cabinet of 15 ministers was the largest cabinet in Maltese history. This record was again surpassed when Muscat announced a cabinet reshuffle following the appearance of Minister Konrad Mizzi's name in the Panama Papers; the new cabinet featured 16 ministers as well as the Prime Minister. Mizzi was included in the new cabinet as Minister within the Office of the Prime Minister. Prior to the 2013 elections, Muscat had pledged that the size of his Cabinet would never exceed the size of the largest Cabinet of the Fenech Adami administrations, the largest of which consisted of 13 ministers.

Further to the outbreak of the Panama Papers, where the already mentioned Mizzi and Keith Schembri, the Chief of Staff within the Office of the Prime Minister were included as owners of a Panama company, together with an unnamed owner of a third company, the Maltese government was receiving copious amounts of pressure by civil society, spearheaded by blogger Daphne Caruana Galizia, but also by the Nationalist Party, especially Leader of the Opposition Simon Busuttil. Nexia BT, a Maltese audit firm, claimed ownership of Egrant.

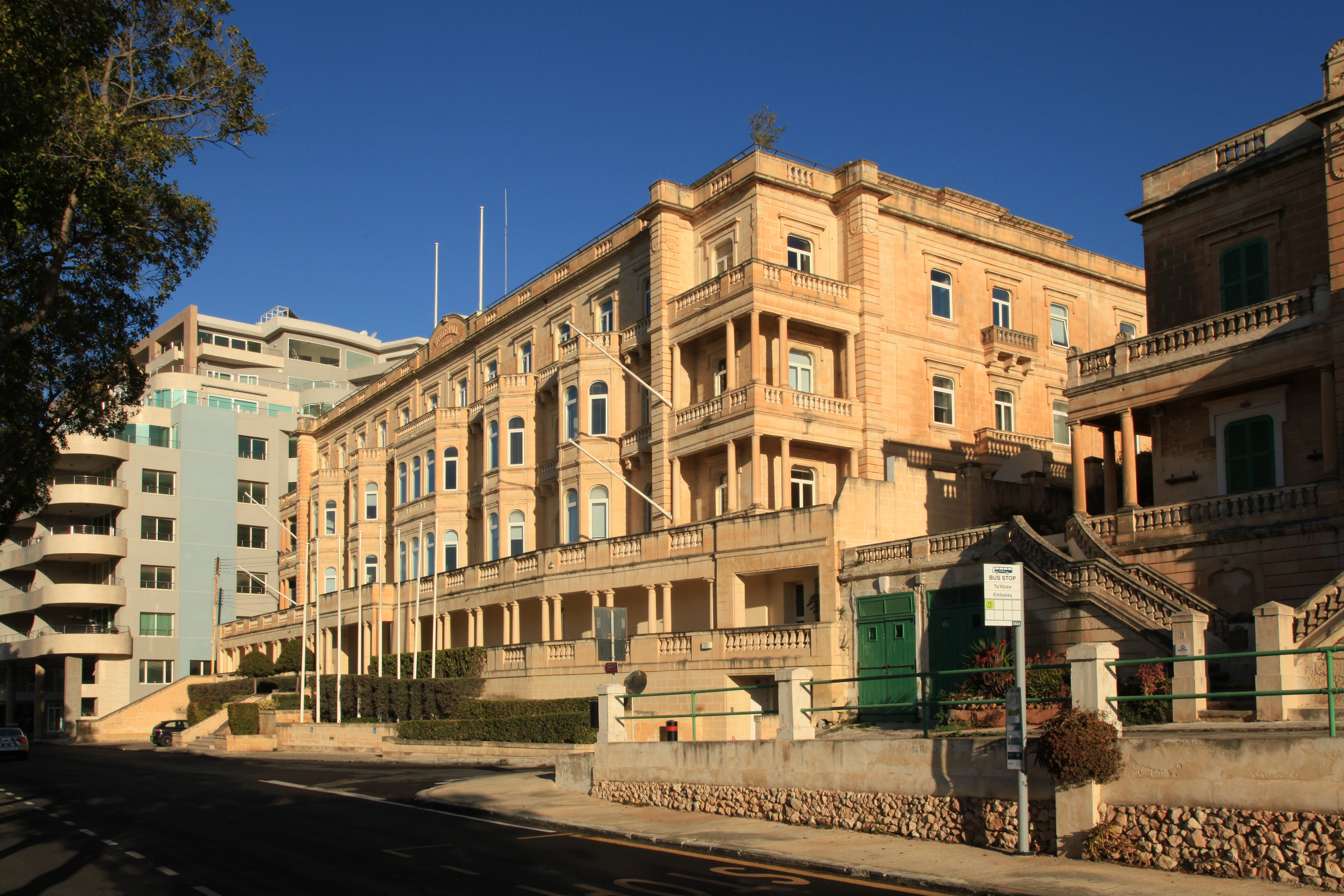
Whitehall Mansions in Ta' Xbiex, which among other tenants houses Pilatus Bank

On 20 April 2017, Caruana Galizia, published a series of articles linking Joseph Muscat, Konrad Mizzi, Brian Tonna (managing partner at Nexia BT, owner of BT International, which is the sole shareholder in the Maltese Mossack Fonseca franchise). Muscat called a press conference stating that he asked for an inquiry into Caruana Galizia's claims, categorically denying any wrongdoing and labelling the allegations as "the biggest lie in Malta's political history". Around two hours later, Pilatus Bank Chairman Ali Sadr Hasheminejad, an Iranian with a St. Kitts and Nevis passport, was spotted exiting the bank with a colleague, each carrying a piece of luggage. Hasheminejad declined to give further information. Police raided Pilatus Bank on 21 April, however this was deemed as being too late by the PN media since that night a "mysterious" ferry flight operated by VistaJet was en route to Baku, Azerbaijan. Further to this, PN leader Busuttil called for Muscat's resignation and announced a national demonstration against corruption, also deeming inappropriate the Police's "inaction" since the Police Commissioner was enjoying dinner in a restaurant. Michael Briguglio, an Alternattiva Demokratika politician, agreed that the Prime Minister should resign and tweeted that he would be joining the protest.

On 1 May 2017 Muscat announced a snap election to take place on 3 June 2017. The announcement was made during a May Day rally organised by the Labour Party in Valletta. The reason cited was to safeguard economic stability from the power hungry.

== Electoral system ==
The Maltese voting system is a variant of proportional representation, achieved through the use of the single transferable vote, with five MPs to be returned from each of thirteen districts. The five seat electoral district system is maintained by the parties represented in the House of Representatives but is not a constitutional requirement. Overall, there are 65 constituency seats, with a variable number of at-large seats (up to four) added in some cases, to ensure that the overall first-preference vote is reflected in the composition of the House of Representatives, that is, that the party with the most votes has a majority of seats.

== Participating parties ==
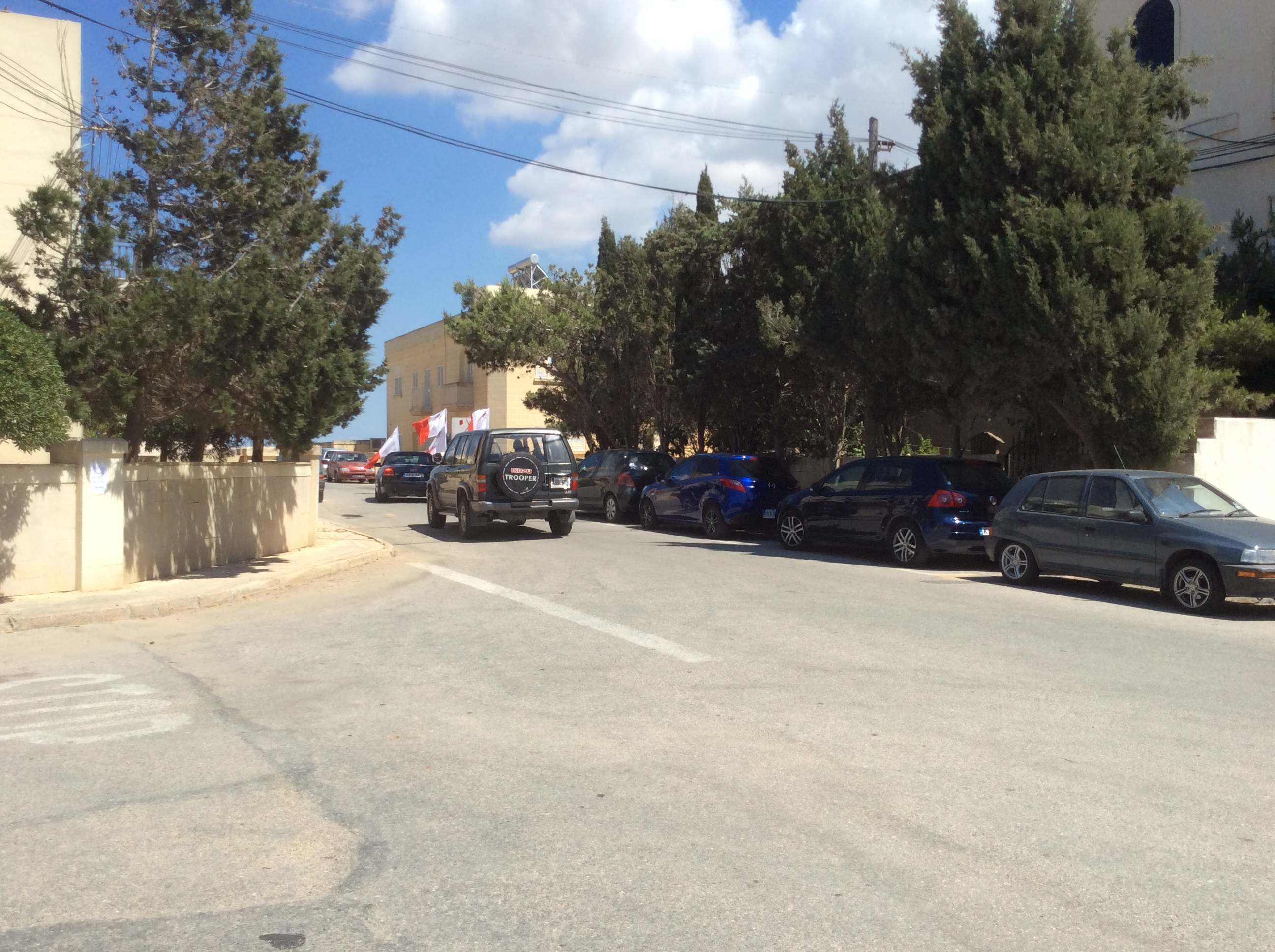
Moviment Patrijotti Maltin driving with loud speaker in Mġarr

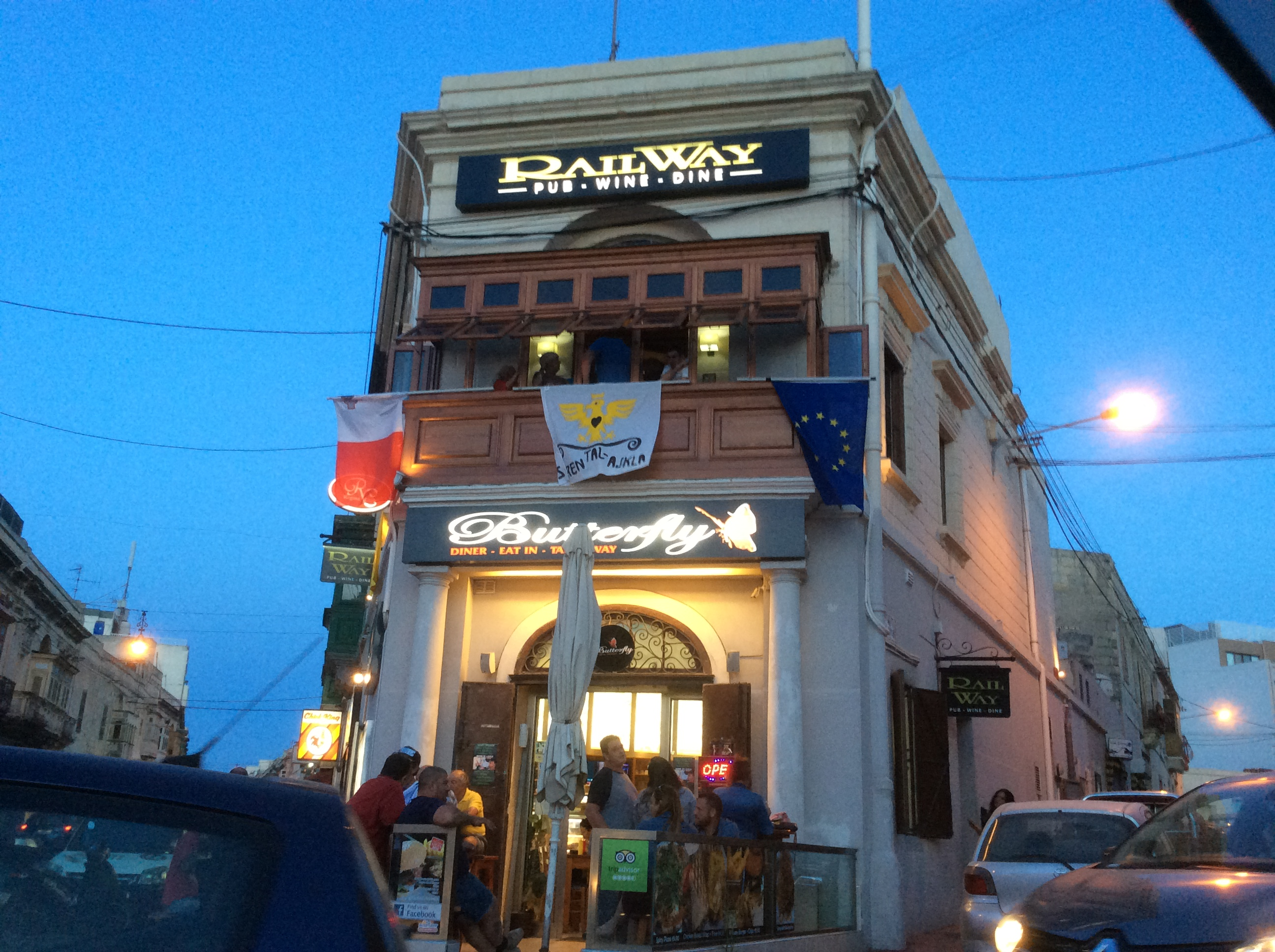
Zaren tal-Ajkla support

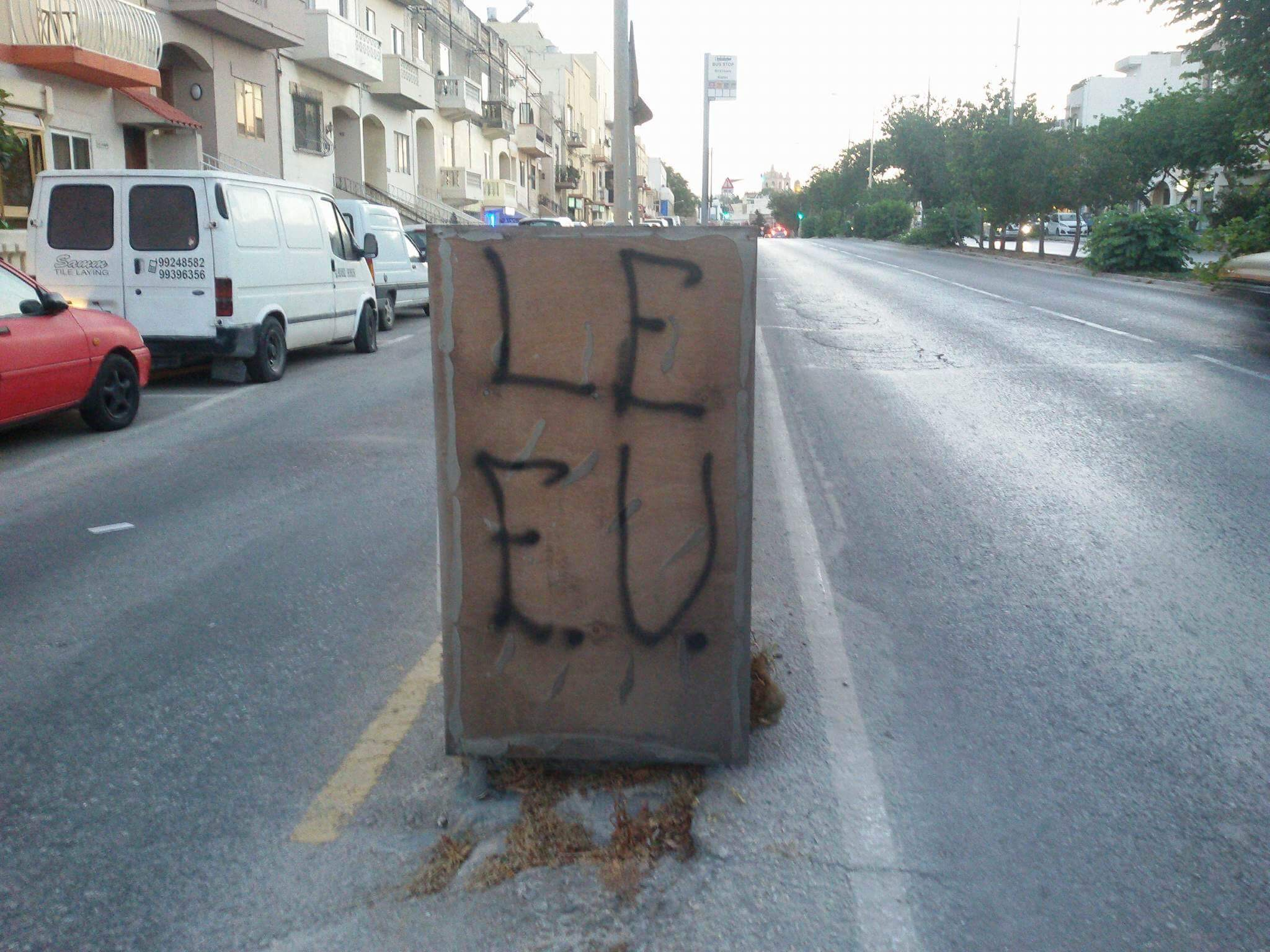
Eurosceptic banner in Birkirkara

The Maltese political landscape is regarded as one of the most pure two-party systems of the 21st century, and has been dominated by moderate centre-left and centre-right groups for decades; no third parties had elected MPs since the 1962 election. Six parties fielded candidates in the 2017 election, the first time since 1962 that Maltese voters had that many parties on the ballot:

- The Labour Party (PL) of incumbent Prime Minister Joseph Muscat held a majority in the legislature since the 2013 election, with 38 MPs at dissolution. The Labour Party traditionally pursues social democratic ideals, and is rooted in the mainstream European centre-left.
- The Nationalist Party (PN) of opposition leader Simon Busuttil is the major opposition party in parliament, with 29 MPs at dissolution. The party's last prime minister was Lawrence Gonzi, who also served as prime minister from 2004 to 2013. For much of its history, the PN has embraced conservatism and Christian democracy, as well as European integration.
- The Democratic Party (PD) which was founded when Labour MP Marlene Farrugia left her party on 4 June 2016. It had 1 MP (Farrugia herself) at dissolution. On 28 April 2017, the PD formed the Forza Nazzjonali coalition with the PN. Under the agreement candidates contested the election as Nationalist candidates, with the additional descriptor "tal-oranġjo", and any elected PD members would have participated in a potential Nationalist-led government.
- The Democratic Alternative (AD), led by Carmel Cacopardo, is a contemporary party in Malta. It is, however, not represented in parliament. Established in 1989, the party stresses green politics and sustainable development.
- Moviment Patrijotti Maltin (MPM), an offshoot of the anti-immigration group Għaqda Patrijotti Maltin led by Henry Battistino which campaigns against illegal immigration, Malta's participation in the Schengen Area, and Islam in Malta.
- Alleanza Bidla (AB), a conservative Christian and Eurosceptic party led by Ivan Grech Mintoff.

== Opinion polls ==
Prior to the announcement of the election, opinion polls showed the Labour Party with a consistent lead over the Nationalist Party of around 5 percentage points. Opinion polls conducted during the campaign continued to show similar results.

== Candidates and returned MPs ==
Below is a list of the candidates who ran in the 2017 general election; they are listed in the order used by the Maltese Electoral Commission. Party leaders are marked with an asterisk, while all candidates that successfully obtained a seat in the election, as reported by the electoral commission, are marked in bold. Individual candidates may contest more than one constituency, meaning the some names appear in multiple cells. It is possible for a candidate to be elected in two districts, in which case they resign from one and that seat is assigned to a person of the same party.

District	Labour Party	Nationalist Party (+Democratic Party)	Democratic Alternative	Moviment Patrijotti Maltin	Alleanza Bidla	Independents
District 1	**Aaron Farrugia**; **Deo Debattista**; Luciano Busuttil; Joseph Matthew Attard; Silvio Parnis; Joe Cilia; **Jose Herrera**; Carlo Stivala; Davina Sammut Hili	Edward Torpiano; **Mario De Marco**; Ray Bugeja; Paula Mifsud Bonnici; Anthony Buttigieg; Justin Schembri; Liam Sciberras; **Claudio Grech**; Herman Farrugia	Marc'Andrea Cassar	Simon Borg; Henry Battistino*	Ivan Grech Mintoff*	Joseph Aquilina
District 2	**Joe Mizzi**; Stefan Buontempo; Deo Debattista; Byron Camilleri; **Joseph Muscat***; **Glenn Bedingfield**; **Chris Agius**; Helena Dalli; Mark Causon; Carmelo Abela	Doris Borg; Mary Bezzina; Salvu Mallia; Jason Zammit; Angelo Micallef; Errol Cutajar; Charles Bonello; Ruben Teeling; Malcolm Bezzina; Josie Muscat; Kevin Cassar; **Stephen Spiteri**; Ivan Bartolo	Mario Mallia; Christian Mizzi	Norman Scicluna; Alexander Darmanin; Naged Megally	—	—
District 3	Owen Bonnici; Joe Mizzi; Sebastian Muscat; **Chris Fearne**; Edric Micallef; Kenneth Spiteri; Mario Calleja; Marion Mizzi; Chris Agius; Etienne Grech; **Helena Dalli**; **Silvio Grixti**; **Carmelo Abela**; Jean Claude Micallef	John Baptist Camilleri; Raymond Caruana; Janice Chetcuti; Mary Bezzina; Jason Zammit; Errol Cutajar; Carm Mifsud Bonnici; **Mario Galea**; Charlot Cassar; Amanda Abela; Catherine Farrugia; Mario Rizzo Naudi; Josie Muscat; Stephen Spiteri	Christian Mizzi	Graziella Borg Duca; Alexander Darmanin	—	Nazzareno Bonnici
District 4	Stefan Buontempo; **Konrad Mizzi**; Chris Fearne; **Byron Camilleri**; Andrew Ellul; **Silvio Parnis**; Joe Cilia; **Etienne Grech**; Dominic Grima; Rita Sammut	**Jason Azzopardi**; Aaron Micallef Piccione; Caroline Galea; Ivan Bartolo; Charles Bonello; Carm Mifsud Bonnici; Therese Comodini Cachia; Catherine Farrugia; Lawrence Bonavia; Liam Sciberras; Mark Sammut	Carmel Cacopardo	Stephen Florian; Norman Scicluna; Desmond Falzon; Henry Battistino*	—	—
District 5	**Julia Farrugia Portelli**; Joseph Cutajar; **Owen Bonnici**; Roderick Cachia; Sebastian Muscat; Luciano Busuttil; Joe Farrugia; Edric Micallef; Joseph Muscat*; Glenn Bedingfield; **Stefan Zrinzo Azzopardi**; Mario Calleja; Carlo Stivala; Rita Sammut	**Hermann Schiavone**; Norman Vella; Stanley Zammit; **Anthony Bezzina**; Nick Refalo; Marlene Farrugia; Shirley Cauchi; Mario Rizzo Naudi; Mary Grace Vella; Noel Galea	Pascal Aloisio	Simon Borg; Johann Ferriggi	—	—
District 6	Gavin Gulia; Ian Borg; Silvio Schembri; **Roderick Galdes**; **Rosianne Cutajar**; **Robert Abela**	**Clyde Puli**; **Ryan Callus**; George Muscat; Alessia Psaila Zammit; Amanda Abela; Karol Aquilina; Monique Agius; Peter Micallef; Kevin Cassar; Godfrey Farrugia	Simon Galea	Graziella Borg Duca	Saviour Xuereb	—
District 7	Gavin Gulia; Julia Farrugia Portelli; Anthony Agius Decelis; Charles Azzopardi; **Ian Borg**; Stefan Zrinzo Azzopardi; Ian Castaldi Paris; **Silvio Schembri**; **Edward Scicluna**; Jeffrey Pullicino Orlando	Paul Mazzola; Dounia Borg; Beppe Fenech Adami; Antione Borg; Sam Abela; Ian Mario Vassallo; Edwin Vassallo; Monique Agius; Lee Bugeja Bartolo; Peter Micallef; David Vassallo; **Godfrey Farrugia**; **Jean Pierre Debono**	Ralph Cassar	Johann Ferriggi; Anthony Calleja; Alex Pisani	Joseph Giardina	—
District 8	Ian Castaldi Paris; Edward Scicluna; **Edward Zammit Lewis**; Rachel Tua; **Chris Cardona**; Rosianne Cutajar; Alex Muscat	**Beppe Fenech Adami**; **David Agius**; Timothy Alden; Michael Asciak; Malcolm Bezzina; Lee Bugeja Bartolo; Claudette Buttigieg; **Therese Comodini Cachia**; Vincent (Censu) Galea; Angelo Micallef; Giorgio Mario Schembri; Justin Schembri; David Thake; Norman Vella	Mario Mallia; Pascal Aloisio	Romina Farrugia Randon; Ġużeppi Sammut	—	—
District 9	Edward Zammit Lewis; Sigmund Mifsud; **Clifton Grima**; Manuel Mallia; Nikita Zammit Alamango; **Michael Falzon**; Conrad Borg Manche	Alan Abela Wadge; Charles Selvaggi; Francis Zammit Dimech; Karl Gouder; Wayne Hewitt; **Robert Arrigo**; Noel Muscat; George Pullicino; Graziella Attard Previ; Ivan Bartolo; Timothy Alden; Albert Buttigieg; Duncan Bonnici; Roselyn Borg Knight; Evelyn Vella Brincat; Justin Fenech; **Marthese Portelli**; Mark Azzopardi; **Kristy Debono**; Herman Farrugia	Arnold Cassola*; Danika Formosa	Ġużeppi Sammut; Desmond Falzon	Elizabeth Claire Mikkelsen	—
District 10	**Evarist Bartolo**; Sigmund Mifsud; Clifton Grima; Manuel Mallia; Mark Causon; Nikita Zammit Alalmango; **Michael Falzon**; Jean Claude Micallef; Conrad Borg Manche; Marion Mizzi	Alan Abela Wadge; Charles Salvaggi; Francis Zimmit Dimech; Anne Marie Muscat Fenech Adami; **Karl Gouder**; Christopher Sansone; Wayne Hewitt; Robert Arrigo; Noel Muscat; George Pullincino; Nick Refalo; Graziella Attard Previ; Ray Bugeja; **Karol Aqulina**; Albert Buttigieg; **Marlene Farrugia**; Anthony Buttigieg; Roselyn Borg (Borg Knight); Brincat Evelyn Vella; Justin Fenech; Jason Zammit	Arnold Cassola*; Danika Formosa	Fatima Hassanin	Elizabeth Claire Mikkelsen	—
District 11	**Anthony (Tony) Agius Decelis**; **Alex Muscat**; Fleur Vella; Michael Farrugia; Chris Cardona; Deborah Schembri; Rachel Tua	Connie Scerri; Simon Busuttil; Graziella Galea; Alex Perici Calascione; **Maria Deguara**; Alex Mangion; Carmel (Charles) Polidano; Shirley Cauchi; **Edwin Vassallo**; Simone Aquilana; Giorgio Mario Schembri; **Ivan Bartolo**; David Agius	Carmel Cacopardo; Ralph Cassar	Romina Farrugia Randon; Naged Megally	Saviour Xuereb	—
District 12	Evarist Bartolo; Fleur Vella; Franco Mercieca; Kenneth Spiteri; Joseph Matthew Attard; Alfred Grima; **Michael Farrugia**; Deborah Schembri; **Clayton Bartolo**	**Robert Cutajar**; David Thake; Anne Marie Muscat Fenech Adami; Salvu Mallia; **Simon Busuttil**; Edward Torpiano; Graziella Galea; **Claudette Buttigieg**; Sam Abela; Maria Deguara; Duncan Bonnici; Simone Aquilina; Mark Azzopardi	Simon Galea; Luke Caruana	Anthony Calleja; Fatima Hassanin	Ivan Grech Mintoff*; Joseph Giardina	Joseph Aquilina
District 13	**Anton Refalo**; Joe Cordina; George Camilleri; Franco Mercieca; **Justyne Caruana**; **Clint Camilleri**	Ryan Mercieca; Vincent (Ċensu) Galea; Carmel (Charles) Polidano; Maria Portelli; Kevin Cutajar; **David Stellini**; **Chris Said**; Frederick Azzopardi; Jason Zammit; Marthese Portelli; Joseph Ellis	Luke Caruana	Stephen Florian	—	Nazzareno Bonnici

The names of the 65 MPs returned for the districts are in bold in the list above. In addition to these, two Nationalist candidates (Carm Mifsud Bonnici and Frederick Azzopardi) were awarded at-large seats in accordance with the proportional representation system.

== Results ==
The 13 separate district election contests produced 37 Labour MPs and 28 Nationalist MPs. Two at-large seats were awarded to the Nationalist Party.

Party or alliance		Votes	%	Seats	+/–
Labour Party		170,976	55.04	37	–2
Forza Nazzjonali	Nationalist Party	130,850	42.12	28	–2
Forza Nazzjonali	Democratic Party	4,846	1.56	2	New
Forza Nazzjonali	Total	135,696	43.68	30	0
Democratic Alternative		2,564	0.83	0	0
Moviment Patrijotti Maltin		1,117	0.36	0	New
Alleanza Bidla		221	0.07	0	New
Independents		91	0.03	0	0
Total		310,665	100.00	67	–2
Valid votes		310,665	98.72		
Invalid/blank votes		4,031	1.28		
Total votes		314,696	100.00		
Registered voters/turnout		341,856	92.06		
Source: Electoral Commission, Times of Malta

== Reactions ==
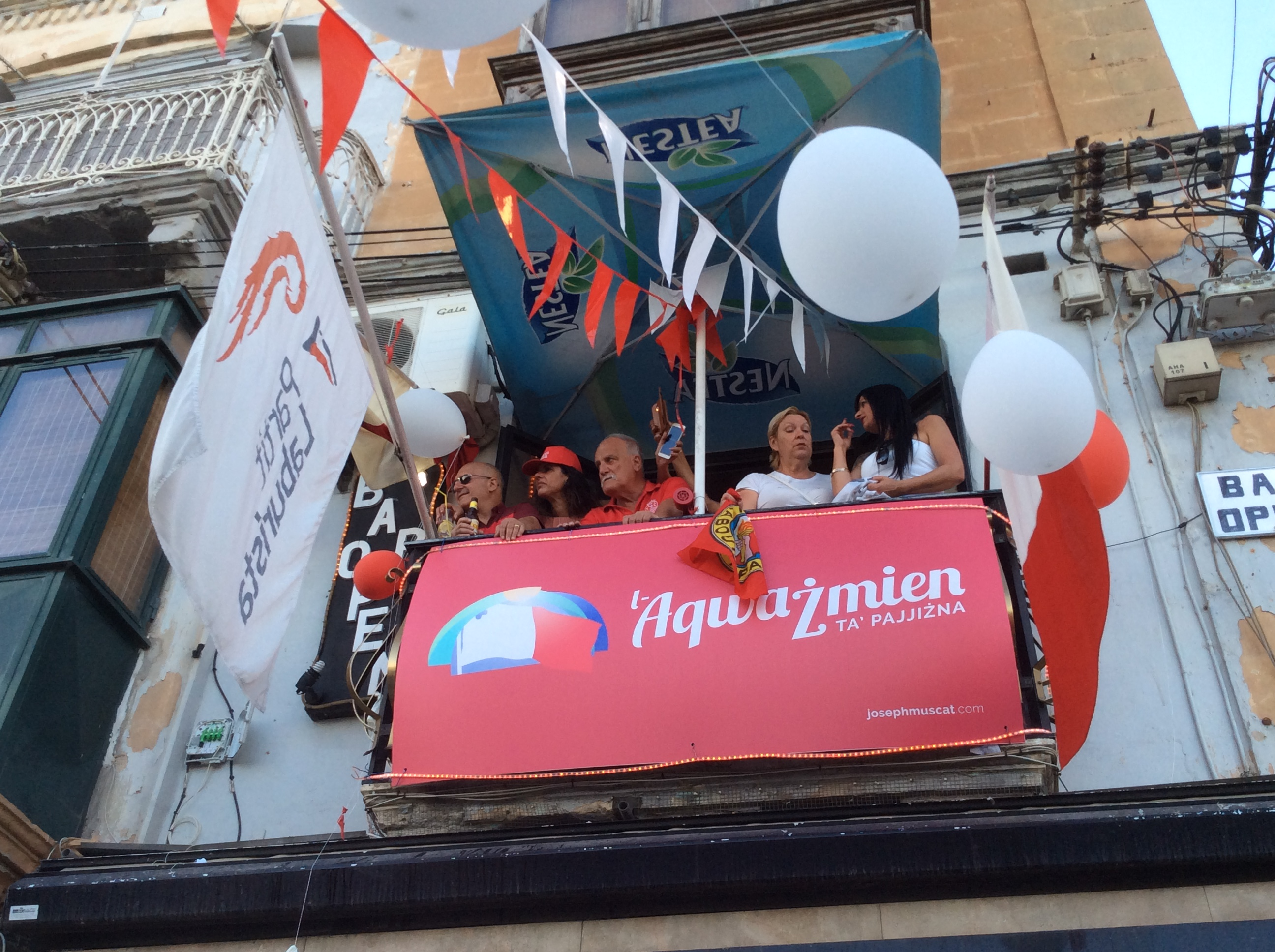
Labourites celebrating in Sliema the day after the election

Once preliminary results were known, Muscat claimed victory and Busuttil conceded defeat. Muscat declared the result to be an endorsement of his government's programme, stating that "It is clear that the people have chosen to stay the course."

Busuttil tendered his resignation as Nationalist Party leader, along with that of the entire administration of the Nationalist Party, following the defeat. The party began the process of selecting a new leader, which was expected to be complete by September. Despite this, leading Nationalist Robert Arrigo wrote an open letter to Busuttil imploring him to rescind his resignation.

The Democratic Party celebrated the election of its leader Marlene Farrugia as their first-ever elected MP as a 'historic result'.
