= Anthony Buttigieg =

Maltese politician

Leader of the Democratic Party
- In office 1 November 2017 – 13 October 2018
- Preceded by: Marlene Farrugia
- Succeeded by: Godfrey Farrugia

Personal details
- Party: Democratic Party
- Profession: Politician, Doctor

Anthony Buttigieg (born 1962) is a Maltese politician, doctor and a former leader of the Democratic Party.

== Early life ==
Anthony Buttigieg was born in Malta in 1962. He spent his childhood in England. He graduated in medicine from the University of Malta in 1987. He spent several years working at St. Luke's Hospital in the emergency department before moving to St. James Hospital where he worked as a senior medical officer. In 1999 Buttigieg led a medical mission to Albania during the Kosovo War. He is a founding member of the Democratic Party becoming a deputy leader upon its formation, and later a leader up till now.

=== Hobbies ===
In his free time, Buttigieg enjoys painting and reading – a hobby which accrued him a library of some 2000 books. He also loves nature and growing vegetables in his own home garden patch.

== Political career ==
As deputy leader of Partit Demokratiku, Buttigieg made clear he was against the "us vs them" mentality of Maltese tribal politics.

Anthony Buttigieg was appointed leader of the Democratic Party on 1 November 2017. He stated that fighting corruption would be a main priority, along with fighting for the environment.

Upon assuming the leadership, he explained in an interview that he wanted the Democratic Party to be a band of concerned citizens, and for Maltese politics to move beyond partisan cults of personality.

He led a delegation of the Democratic Party to Amsterdam, to participate in the congress of the Alliance of Liberals and Democrats for Europe Party. The Democratic Party then acceded to ALDE.

Buttigieg spoke out against the government's economic model, making the rich richer and failing to distribute wealth beyond cronyism.

He wrote to the EU Commissioner for Competition, Margrethe Vestager, to investigate ENEMED's 'fuel supply monopoly'.

Along with deputy leader Timothy Alden he met with representatives of Maltese NGOs, including Din l-Art Ħelwa and Flimkien għal Ambjent Aħjar to pledge support to the Wirtna declaration.

When the rule of law delegation came to visit Malta, he led a Democratic Party delegation to meet them. In the meeting, the Party said that clientelism in Malta was a major problem, and the Vitals Global Healthcare deal was discussed.

He has also argued for a more inclusive national identity.

Deciding to prioritise the upcoming European Parliament election, 2019, while balancing his other personal responsibilities, and believing it to be in the interests of the Democratic Party, Buttigieg announced that he would be stepping down from the leadership. He remained active within the party during its transition into the 2019 European Parliament election cycle. Buttigieg stepped down as party leader in 2018. He was succeeded as party leader by Godfrey Farrugia, who led the party through the 2019 election campaign. During this period, the Democratic Party sought cooperation with other small progressive political groups in Malta, as part of wider efforts to strengthen its electoral position. Buttigieg himself remained on the party’s electoral list and participated in the campaign as one of its candidates. After the election, internal restructuring continued within the party, with Timothy Alden serving as a key figure in its leadership during a period of reduced parliamentary representation and organisational change.

Following the 2019 European Parliament election, Buttigieg stepped back from frontline political leadership within the Democratic Party. He returned to his medical profession after the end of the campaign period. He remained associated with public discussion on governance and institutional reform in Malta, although he did not hold a formal leadership position within the party during its subsequent organisational changes.
