= Cavalier Tower =

Tower in Qrendi, Malta

- Torri tal-Kavalier
- Qrendi, Malta
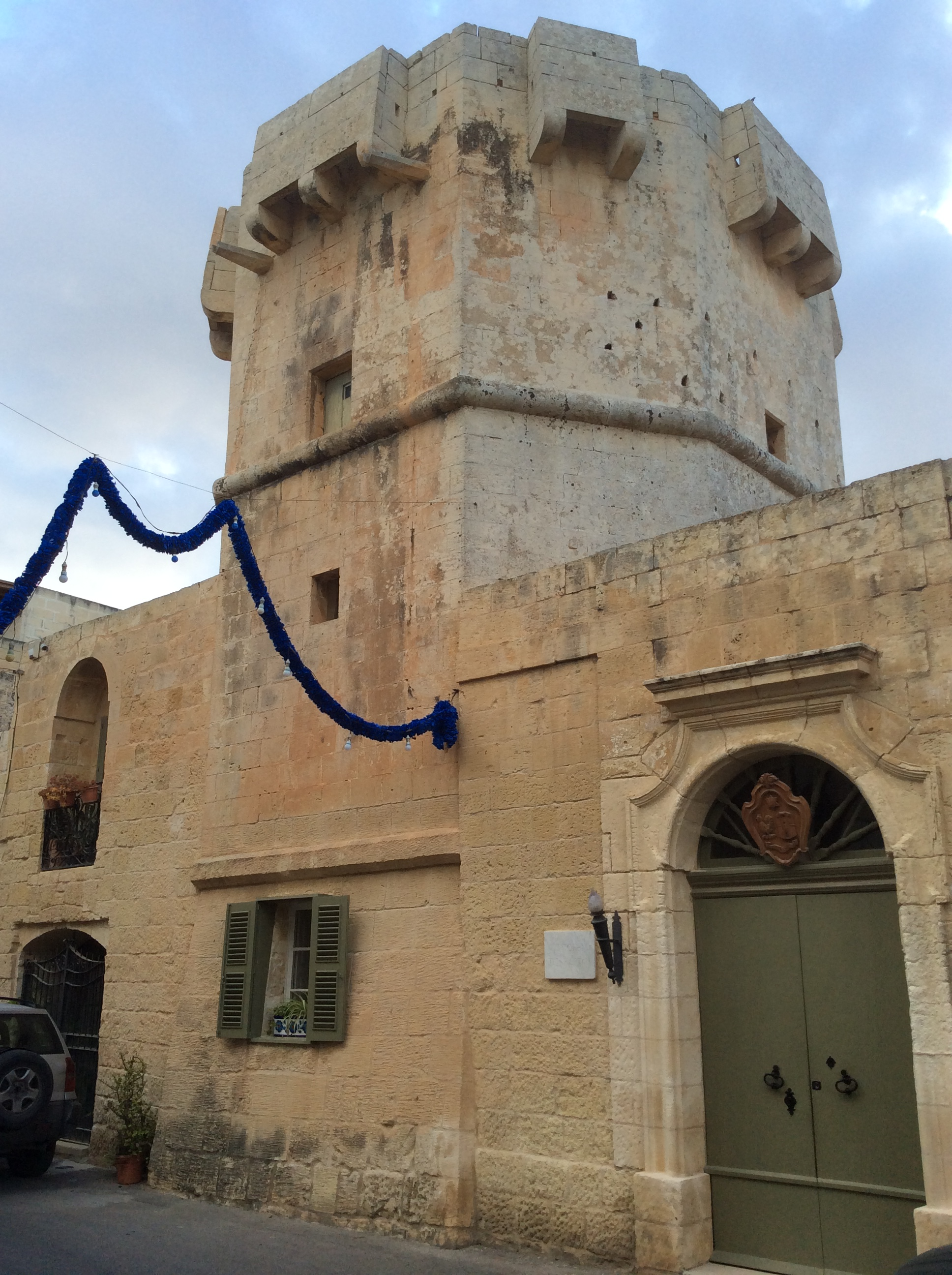
- Cavalier Tower in 2017

Site information
- Type: Tower
- Owner: Marlene Farrugia
- Open to the public: No
- Condition: Intact

Location
- Coordinates: 35°50′10.7″N 14°27′28.6″E

Site history
- Built by: Unknown, possibly Order of Saint John
- In use: Yes, as residence and office
- Materials: Limestone
- Address: 32, "Torri tal-Kaptan", Tower Road, Qrendi

Cavalier Tower (Maltese: Torri tal-Kavalier), also known as Qrendi Tower (Maltese: Torri tal-Qrendi) or Captain's Tower (Maltese: Torri tal-Kaptan), and previously as Ellul Preziosi Tower (Maltese: Torri Ellul Preziosi), is a tower in the town of Qrendi, Malta. It was built in the late medieval or early Hospitaller period, and is one of the oldest surviving towers in Malta.

== History ==
No records exist on the date of construction of Cavalier Tower. It was possibly built in the late medieval period, when Malta was still part of the Kingdom of Sicily. If this is correct, it would be the only surviving medieval tower in Malta, apart from the ruins of a circular tower in Xlendi. Other historians believe that the tower was built in the 16th or 17th century by the Order of Saint John. It is situated near a 16th-century property, built in 1585. In the 17th century, the tower and residence were modified, when the tower lost most of its defensive architecture.

Cavalier Tower was named as such since it housed a Captain (Maltese: Kaptan Kavallier) of the Order.

The tower has an octagonal plan, and it is the only one in Malta with such a design. It is three stories high, and has cordons between each floor. A number of box machicolations supported on corbels are located at the crest of its parapet. The tower's main entrance is located in an adjacent medieval residence, which was originally a mill room or a chapel.

The tower is surrounded by a cluster of contemporary buildings and courtyards, which have been called "one of the most interesting examples of architectural development" in Malta. In the early 20th century, an underground air shelter was excavated beneath the property to be used during the Second World War.

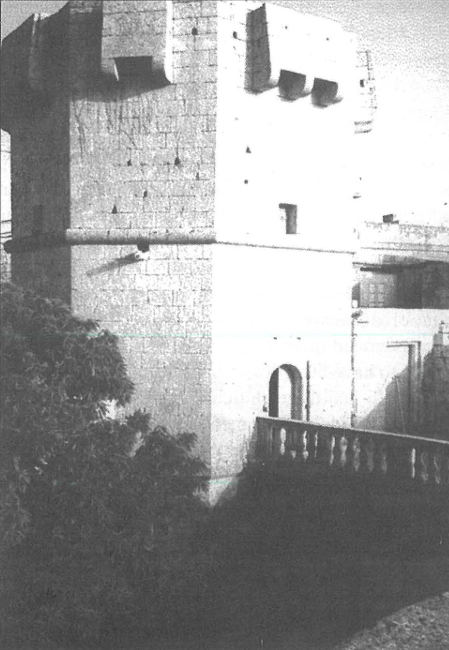
Old photo of Cavalier Tower

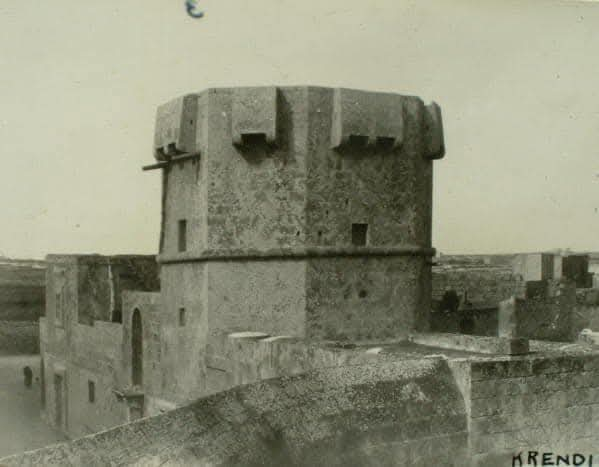
Old Photo of Cavalier Tower

The tower was included on the Antiquities List of 1925. It is also a Grade 1 scheduled building and list on the National Inventory of the Cultural Property of the Maltese Islands.

== Present day ==
Today, Cavalier Tower is in good condition. It is a private residence owned by former MP Marlene Farrugia and is not open to the public. A permission to restore the residence, incorporating the tower, was granted by the Planning Authority in 2011. It is currently for sale at approximately €4 million.
