= Martin Cauchi Inglott =

Maltese politician

Secretary General of the Democratic Party

Personal details
- Born: Malta
- Party: Democratic Party
- Profession: Politician, political party secretary general, former Armed Forces of Malta Navy officer, diplomat

Martin Cauchi Inglott was a Maltese politician until 2019. He was Secretary-General of the Partit Demokratiku or Democratic Party of Malta, and contested the European Parliamentary elections. Prior to that he served as senior officer in the Armed Forces of Malta, retiring from the Force after serving as Maltese Military Representative to the EU, and a final posting to the EU Military Staff.
