= William Inglott =

English organist and composer

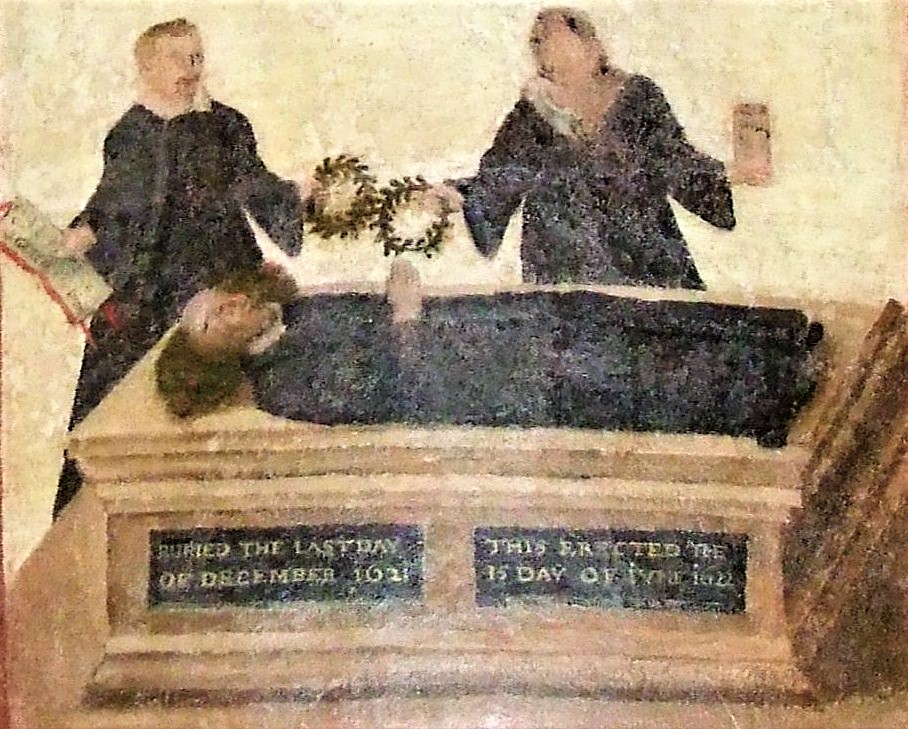
A detail from William Inglott's memorial plaque at Norwich Cathedral

William Inglott or Inglot (1553/4 – buried 31 December 1621) was an English organist and composer of the Elizabethan era, who is mostly associated with the cathedral in the English city of Norwich.

Inglott moved from Norwich to Hereford Cathedral, returning in 1611 to replace the composer Thomas Morley as the cathedral organist. His memorial plaque at Norwich Cathedral was restored 90 years after his death. Amongst the few surviving works by Ingott are two keyboard pieces by Ingott in the collection of keyboard music known as the Fitzwilliam Virginal Book and a Short Service for four voices, reconstructed in 1989.

== Biography ==
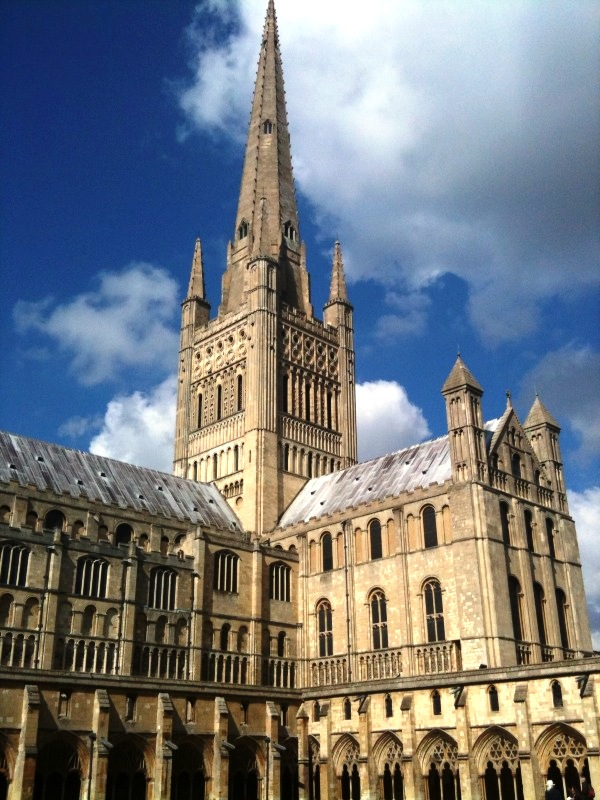
Norwich Cathedral

William Inglott's father Edmund (d. 1583) was the organist at Norwich Cathedral. William retained a strong connection to the cathedral during his career, first as a chorister under his father (1567–1568), as a lay clerk (from 1576), and as the cathedral's organist (1587–1591). He was paid in 1582 for teaching the boys in the choir during a period when his father was too ill to work.

Inglott moved to Hereford Cathedral as Master of the Choristers from 1597 until some time after 1610, but returned to Norwich as organist in 1611, replacing the composer Thomas Morley. Nothing is known of his career during this intervening period. Upon his return to Norwich he was paid to be the organist on 1 June; his first recorded payment (1 June 1611), which was double the salary given to Morley, may reflect an increase in responsibility or workload. He held the position until his death in December 1621, aged 67. His painted memorial plaque on a pillar in the cathedral records he was buried on 31 December of that year. The memorial shows two choristers bearing wreaths over his body and the following verse:

Here Willyam Inglott Organist doth rest,
Whose arte in musique this cathedrall blest,
For descant most, for voluntary all
He past: on organ, songe and virginall:
He left this life at age of sixtie seaven;
And now 'mongst angells all sings saint in heaven;
His fame flies farr, his name shal never die;
See art and age here crowne his memory.

The monument was restored 90 years after Inglott's death, at the expense of the composer William Croft.

== Surviving works ==
Few works by Inglott survive. Two keyboard pieces, The Leaves Bee Greene and A Galliard Ground, are preserved in the Fitzwilliam Virginal Book, a collection of Elizabethan and Jacobean keyboard music with works by Inglott's contemporaries, such as Thomas Morley, William Byrd and Martin Peerson. An untitled keyboard piece by 'Englitt' in Will Forster's Virginal Book (c.1624) at the British Library may also have been composed by Inglott. The musicologist Ian Payne describes the variations by Inglott in the Fitzwilliam Virginal as being "well crafted, richly polyphonic, and technically demanding".

In 1989, Inglott's Short Service for four voices was reconstructed by Michael Walsh from transcriptions by Richard Turbet.

=== Recordings ===
Recordings of music by William Inglott
Year	Album	Piece	Label
1992	Morley, Parsley and Inglott	Conserva Me, Domine; Lamentations	Priory Records
2018	The Passinge Mesures	The Leaves Bee Greene	Hyperion

== Sources ==
- Browne, Philip (1785). An Account of the Cathedral Church of Norwich, and Its Precincts from Its Foundation to the Present Time. W. Chase & Co.
- Lasocki, David (2018). A Biographical Dictionary of English Court Musicians, 1485–1714. Vol. 1 and 2. Taylor & Francis. ISBN 978-13515-7-822-6.
- Le Huray, Peter (1967). Music and the Reformation in England, 1549-1660. Oxford: Oxford University Press. ISBN 978-02576-6-661-7.
