= Timothy Alden (inventor) =

American inventor (1823–1858)

- Born: February 3, 1823; Barnstable, Massachusetts, U.S.
- Died: December 4, 1858 (aged 35); New York City, U.S.
- Resting place: Green-Wood Cemetery, Brooklyn, New York City
- Occupations: inventor, businessperson
- Employer(s): The Alden Type Setting & Distributing Machine Co.
- Known for: The Alden-type
- Relatives: John Alden

Timothy Alden (February 3, 1823 – December 4, 1858), was an American inventor, known for The Alden-type, a typesetting machine.

== Biography ==
Alden was born at Barnstable, Massachusetts, on February 3, 1823, sixth in descent from John Alden, the Puritan. Other sources refers he was born on June 14, 1819. When very young he was apprenticed to his brother, who was a printer, and at the age of seventeen began to plan a machine "for setting and distributing type".

It took five years for his crude idea to develop into a practical reality, and then he produced a composing and distributing machine, the type arranged in cells around the circumference of a horizontal wheel, as the wheel revolves the receivers pick up the type as directed by the operator. He removed to New York City in 1846, and thenceforth applied himself sedulously to his favourite idea with such success, that a practical, though imperfect, machine was completed and patented in various countries in 1856; the English patent is No. 3089, December 29, 1856, "for settings and distributing printing types." The U.S. patent is No. 18175, on September 15, 1857, with classifications "details of, or accessories for, machines for mechanical composition using matrices for individual characters which are selected and assembled for type casting or moulding" and "arrangements or devices for distributing matrices or space bands after casting or moulding."

This machine was improved by his brother Henry W. Alden, after the death of Timothy, and was the pioneer in type-setting machines in the United States, although it did not come into extensive practical use. He died in New York City, on December 4, 1858.

== Sources ==
- Bigmore, E. C.; Wyman, C. W. H., eds. (2014) [1886]. A Bibliography of Printing. Vol. 3. Cambridge University Press. p. 107. ISBN 978-110807434-6.
- Johnson, Andrew (1967). Bergeron, Paul H. (ed.). The Papers of Andrew Johnson: November 1867. Vol. 13. Knoxville, Tenn.: The University of Tennessee Press. p. 255. ISBN 978-087049946-3.
- U.S. Patent Office (September 15, 1857). U.S. Patent No. 18175. Google Patents. pp. 1–18.

Attribution
