= Moviment Patrijotti Maltin =

Maltese Patriots Movement Moviment Patrijotti Maltin
- Abbreviation: MPM
- Leader: Simon Borg
- Founded: 8 April 2016
- Ideology: Right-wing populism; Conservatism; Anti-Islam
- Political position: Far-right
- House of Representatives: 0 / 67
- European Parliament: 0 / 6
- Local Council Seats: 0 / 462

Website
- patrijottimaltin.org

The Maltese Patriots Movement (Maltese: Moviment Patrijotti Maltin, MPM) is an inactive political party in Malta. A right-wing populist party, it was formed in April 2016 as a political wing of the Maltese Patriotic Association.

== History ==
The MPM was founded on the 8 April 2016 and immediately announced its application to the Electoral Commission as a new political party under the Financing of Political Parties Act. In the 2017 Maltese general election, the party failed to elect any candidate in parliament. Shortly after the 2019 European Parliament election, the party became inactive, while its social media accounts went inactive later in 2020.

== Positions ==
The Maltese Patriots Movement is oriented towards far-right politics. It has expressed right-wing populist rhetoric by stating opposition to immigration and criticizing Islam. It has called for European Union funds allocated to Malta for the purpose be instead allocated for the benefit of Maltese people and for Malta to no longer be a member of the Schengen Area. It also opposes the Maltese government's endorsement of the non-binding Global Compact for Safe, Orderly and Regular Migration. It has also expressed opposition to abortion and illegal immigration.

At an October 2016 protest led by the party against the possible opening of a Muslim prayer room in Buġibba, leader Henry Battistino called for a national registry of Muslims and compared Muslim immigrants to rabbits breeding excessively. Stephen Florian, an MPM party official, also spoke at the protest and stated that any religion other than Roman Catholicism should only have one place of worship in the country. Florian later caused controversy when he outed a counter-protester from the Buġibba protest as transgender.

MPM is frequently hostile toward media and the Maltese establishment, with Battistino referring to the media as traitors that are trying to "force [integration] down everyone's throats". The party's sister organisation, Għaqda Patrijotti Maltin, was the subject of a complaint from the Institute of Maltese Journalists for protesters obstructing reporters from doing their job.

== Election results ==
=== House of Representatives ===
Election	Leader	Votes	%	Seats	+/–	Position	Government
2017	Henry Battistino	1,117	0.36	0 / 67	New	5th	Extra-parliamentary

=== European Parliament ===
Election	Leader	Votes	%	Seats	+/–	Position	EP Group
2019	Simon Borg	771	0.30	0 / 6	New	7th	–
