= Marlene Farrugia =

Maltese politician (born 1966)

Leader of the Democratic Party
- In office 21 October 2016 – 21 August 2017
- Succeeded by: Anthony Buttigieg

Member of Parliament
- In office 10 May 2008 – 20 February 2022

Personal details
- Born: 24 July 1966 (age 60) Żurrieq, State of Malta
- Party: Independent
- Other political affiliations: Democratic Party (2016-2019); Labour Party (2003-2016); Nationalist Party (1996-2003)
- Spouse: Jeffrey Pullicino Orlando (divorced)
- Domestic partner: Godfrey Farrugia
- Children: 3
- Education: University of Malta
- Occupation: Politician, Dentist

Marlene Farrugia (born 24 July 1966) is a Maltese former Member of Parliament and former leader of the Democratic Party. Previously she had been a member of the Nationalist Party, with whom she contested the General Elections in 1996 and 1998, and the Labour Party, with whom she was elected in 2008 and 2013, before resigning in 2015. She formed the Democratic Party in 2016, but left it in 2019.

== Political career ==
Farrugia first entered the political scene in 1996, where she stood as a candidate (under the name of Marlene Pullicino) for the Nationalist Party in that year's Local Council elections and was elected, serving on the Zebbug Local Council between 1996 and 1999. She subsequently stood for the 1998 General Elections on the Nationalist Party ticket. She gained 311 first count votes from the fifth electoral district and was not elected.

Following the EU accession referendum held in 2003, Farrugia shifted allegiances to the Labour Party. She contested the 2008 General Elections on behalf of the Labour Party and was elected from the fifth electoral district with a total of 3,375 first-count votes. She was re-elected from the same electoral district in 2013, garnering 2,525 first-count votes.

On 4 December 2018, Farrugia urged the public to "stand up to bullies everywhere and at all times", referring to the Parliamentary sitting during which Economy Minister Chris Cardona was heard threatening her and her partner Godfrey Farrugia by saying "Your turn will come".

=== Democratic Party ===
Following disagreements with the Labour Party, Farrugia tendered her resignation from the party on 17 November 2015, becoming the only independent MP in the Maltese House of Representatives. She later founded the Democratic Party becoming its first leader and only sitting MP. Her election to Parliament in the 2017 general election from the 10th district made her the first elected Member of Parliament from a third party since 1962. She continued to fight against the excesses of the Labour administration and supported the civil society activists' march for truth and justice in April 2018. She criticised the government's handling of the Egrant inquiry, in which attempts were made to sweep other corruption allegations under the carpet. She resigned as leader of the Democratic Party in 2017 and resigned from the party entirely in 2019

=== Political views ===
Farrugia is known for her outspoken nature and has been a vocal critic of her party on a number of issues, including the introduction of divorce, environmental issues and over-development, and good governance. She defines her political position as centre-left, however she is also influenced by her Roman Catholic faith (such as in the run-up to the 2011 referendum on the introduction of divorce, which she initially opposed on religious grounds). Farrugia has also been vocal on issues related to environmental protection (particularly throughout the controversy related to the American Institute of Malta) and good governance, and was highly critical of Minister Konrad Mizzi's and the Maltese Prime Minister's Chief of Staff Keith Schembri's involvement in the Panama Papers leaks. Throughout her career, Farrugia frequently adopted positions against abortion, embryo freezing, and the introduction of the morning-after pill. Nonetheless, in May 2021, she presented a private members' bill to Parliament proposing the decriminalisation of abortion, arguing that "being pro-life should not be perceived as conflicting with women’s self determination and reproductive rights".

== Property ==
Farrugia is the owner of Cavalier Tower, found in Qrendi.
