= Forza Nazzjonali =

- Founded: April 2017
- Dissolved: December 2017
- Ideology: Christian democracy Social liberalism
- Member parties: Nationalist Party; Democratic Party (April–December 2017)
- Colours: Blue and Orange
- Slogan: Jien Nagħżel Malta (I Choose Malta)

Forza Nazzjonali (Maltese for "National Force") was an electoral alliance in Malta. The alliance was formed in April 2017 between the Nationalist Party (PN) and Democratic Party (PD) in the run up to the 2017 general election, with PD candidates running under the PN electoral list.

The alliance between PN and PD was officially dissolved in December 2017.

== Election results ==
=== House of Representatives ===
| Election | Votes | % | Seats | +/– | Rank | Government |
|---|---|---|---|---|---|---|
| 2017 | 135,696 | 43.7 | 30 / 67 | New | 2nd | Opposition |
