= Democratic Party (Malta) =

Democratic Party Partit Demokratiku
- Abbreviation: PD
- Leader: Timothy Alden
- Deputy Leader: Raymond Azzopardi
- Secretary General: Mark Zerafa
- Founder: Marlene Farrugia
- Founded: 21 October 2016; 10 years ago
- Dissolved: 17 October 2020; 6 years ago
- Split from: Labour Party
- Merged into: AD+PD
- Youth wing: The Orange Youth
- Ideology: Social liberalism; Green liberalism; Pro-Europeanism
- Political position: Centre to centre-left
- National affiliation: Forza Nazzjonali (2017)
- European affiliation: Alliance of Liberals and Democrats for Europe
- Colours: Orange

Website
- www.pd.org.mt

The Democratic Party (Maltese: Partit Demokratiku, PD) was a centrist to centre-left political party in Malta. It was founded in 2016 after a split from the Labour Party. It elected Malta's first two third party MPs for the first time since the country's Independence. In August 2020 the party announced an agreement to merge with the green Democratic Alternative party to form a new party called AD+PD. The merger was conducted on 17 October 2020.

== History ==
The PD was founded in 2016 by Marlene Farrugia, who previously sat as an MP for the Labour Party before leaving the party and sitting as an independent MP. Announcing the formation of the new party in June 2016, Farrugia as interim leader stated that the party was a new alternative to the traditionally dominant Labour and Nationalist parties.

Upon formation, founder Marlene Farrugia was declared interim leader. On 21 October 2016, Farrugia was elected the first leader of the PD at a general meeting to confirm the party executive. The party was formally registered with the Electoral Commission of Malta in November 2016.

The party afterwards engaged in talks to form a pre-electoral coalition with the Nationalist Party, resulting in the formation of Forza Nazzjonali, just in time for the 2017 Maltese general election.

PD elected the first Members of Parliament who were not a part of one of the two major parties for the first time since the Independence of Malta.

Shortly after the election, Marlene Farrugia resigned as leader of PD, claiming the party needed to form an identity of its own.

In the ensuing leadership challenge, Anthony Buttigieg became the leader of PD, until standing down in late 2018 to run as an MEP candidate for the party. He was replaced by Godfrey Farrugia, one of the party's two MPs. Godfrey Farrugia led the party into the 2019 European Parliament election in Malta. Some months afterwards, both Godfrey Farrugia and Marlene Farrugia resigned from PD, claiming they were giving it a chance to rebuild the third party movement with a fresh image.

After the resignation of PD's Members of Parliament, deputy leader Timothy Alden declared that he was not quitting anything and became the interim leader of the party. In December 2019, it was announced that ever since September, the party had been in talks with Alternattiva Demokratika to merge into a new party.

On the 17th of October, 2020, the party merged with Alternattiva Demokratika to create the AD+PD.

== Policies ==
The PD website cited a manifesto covering a variety of domains, focussing prominently on democratic principles and good governance. It also tackled issues of the economy, environment, justice and security, as well as other social issues.

== Elections ==
=== 2017 general elections ===
Farrugia stated in January 2017 that the PD was "close" to forming a deal with the opposition Nationalist Party where the two parties would cooperate against the Labour government, though she did not specify if such a deal would be a formal coalition. On 7 April 2017 Farrugia confirmed in an interview with the Times of Malta that PD candidates would be listed as Nationalist Party candidates on the ballot for the 2017 general election. Despite reaching agreement about running candidates under the same banner, formal coalition negotiations remained ongoing until the announcement of a formal agreement on 28 April. Under the agreement, PD candidates contested the 2017 election with their party affiliation listed as Nationalist "tal-oranġjo" (the orange ones) and any PD candidates elected to Parliament would have been part of a Nationalist-led government. Both Marlene Farrugia and Godfrey Farrugia were the only Democratic Party candidates to be elected in 2017, making them the first elected Members of Parliament from a third party since 1962.

=== Post-2017 elections ===
Marlene Farrugia formally resigned from the Leadership of the Partit Demokratiku on 21 August 2017, as part of the process of giving the party an identity distinct from herself. On 30 October 2017, Anthony Buttigieg was declared the new leader, with Marlene Farrugia and Godfrey Farrugia providing parliamentary continuity in the executive. On 1 December 2017 the PD was admitted into the Alliance of Liberals and Democrats for Europe Party, which made the party's image officially considered pro-European.

=== 2019 European parliament elections ===
PD contested for the 2019 European parliament elections, their first outing in European elections. They announced the approval of 3 European parliamentary election candidates, Martin Cauchi Inglott, a senior retired Armed Forces of Malta officer and the current secretary general of the party, and Anthony Buttigieg, the former leader of the party, and Cami Appelgren, an environmental activist and the leader of the environmental organization Malta Clean Up. PD failed to secure any seats, winning 5,276 votes, or 2.03% of the votes cast.

=== 2019 local council elections ===
PD contested for the 2019 local council elections. PD announced the approval of 7 local council election candidates: Timothy Alden for Sliema, Raymond Azzopardi for St. Julian's, Mark Zerafa for Birkirkara, Karen Vella Freeman for St. Paul's Bay, Charles Polidano for Qrendi, Michael Bonett for Valletta, and Manuel Farrugia for Tarxien. The party failed to elect any of its candidates.

== Leaders ==
- Marlene Farrugia (21 October 2016 - 21 August 2017) - resigned as part of the process of giving the party an identity distinct from herself.
- Anthony Buttigieg (30 October 2017 - 8 October 2018) - resigned as part of his campaign as an MEP candidate for the 2019 European Parliament election.
- Godfrey Farrugia (13 October 2018 – 22 September 2019)
- Timothy Alden (22 September 2019 – 6 July 2020) - Ad interim, (6 July 2020 – 3 August)
- AD+PD Transition Team (3 August - 17 October)

== Executive committee ==
- Leader – Timothy Alden
- Deputy Leader – Raymond Azzopardi
- General Secretary – Mark Zerafa
- Public Relations Officer – Marcus Lauri
- Treasurer – Carmel Asciak
- Members – Melissa J. Bagley, Matthew Mizzi, Martina Caruana, Duncan Bonnici

== Election results ==
=== House of Representatives ===
Election	Leader	Votes	%	Seats	+/–	Rank	Government
2017	Marlene Farrugia	4,846	1.56	2 / 67	New	3rd	Opposition

=== European Parliament ===
Election	Leader	Votes	%	Seats	+/–	Rank	EP Group
2019	Godfrey Farrugia	5,276	2.03	0 / 6	New	4th	–

=== Local Councils ===
Election	Leader	Votes	%	Seats	+/-
2019	Godfrey Farrugia	555	0.21	0 / 462	New

== See also ==
- List of political parties in Malta
- Parliament of Malta
