= 2026 Maltese general election =

- 30 May 2026

All seats in the House of Representatives
- Opinion polls
- Turnout: 87.47% (▲1.84pp)
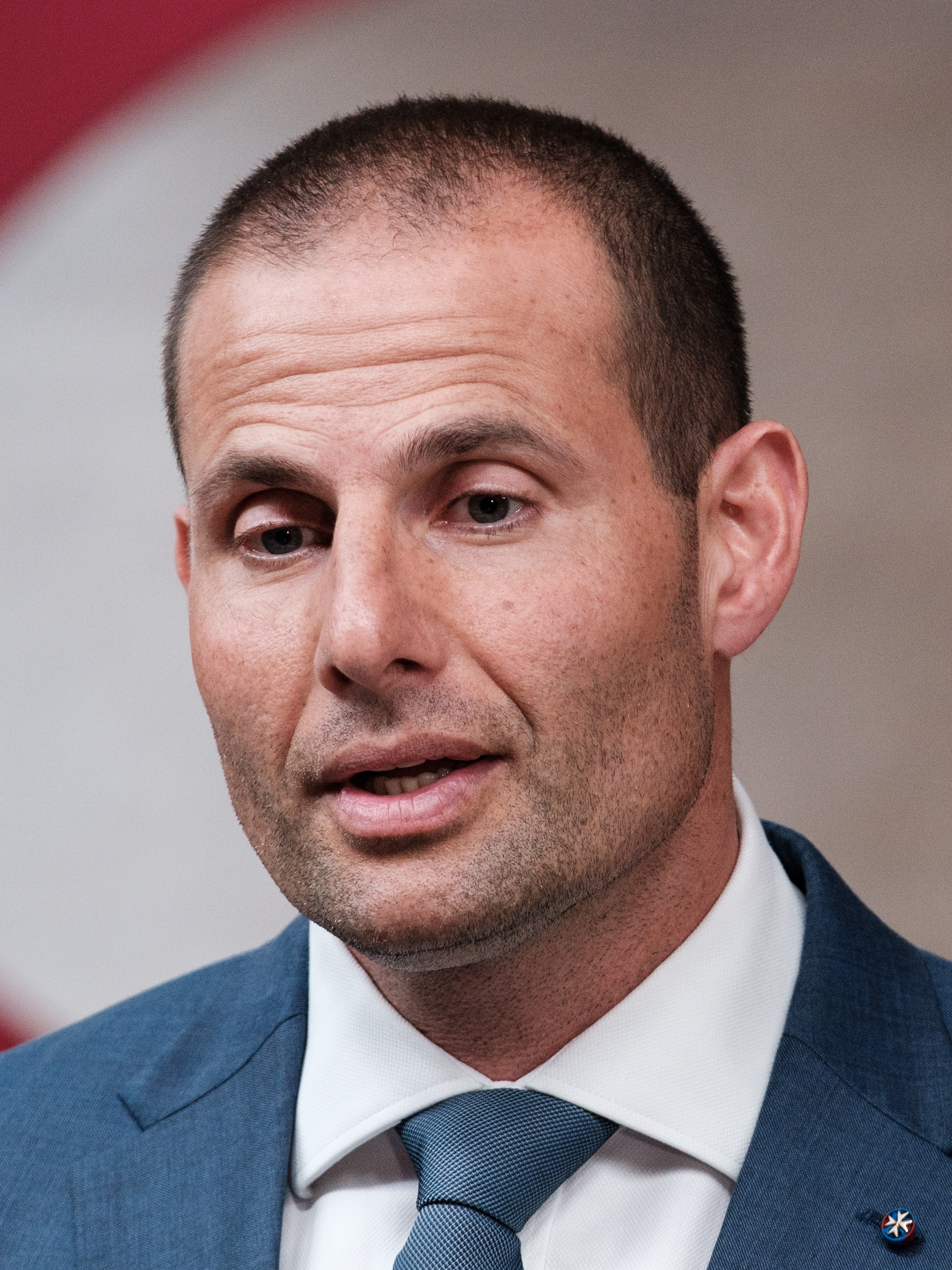

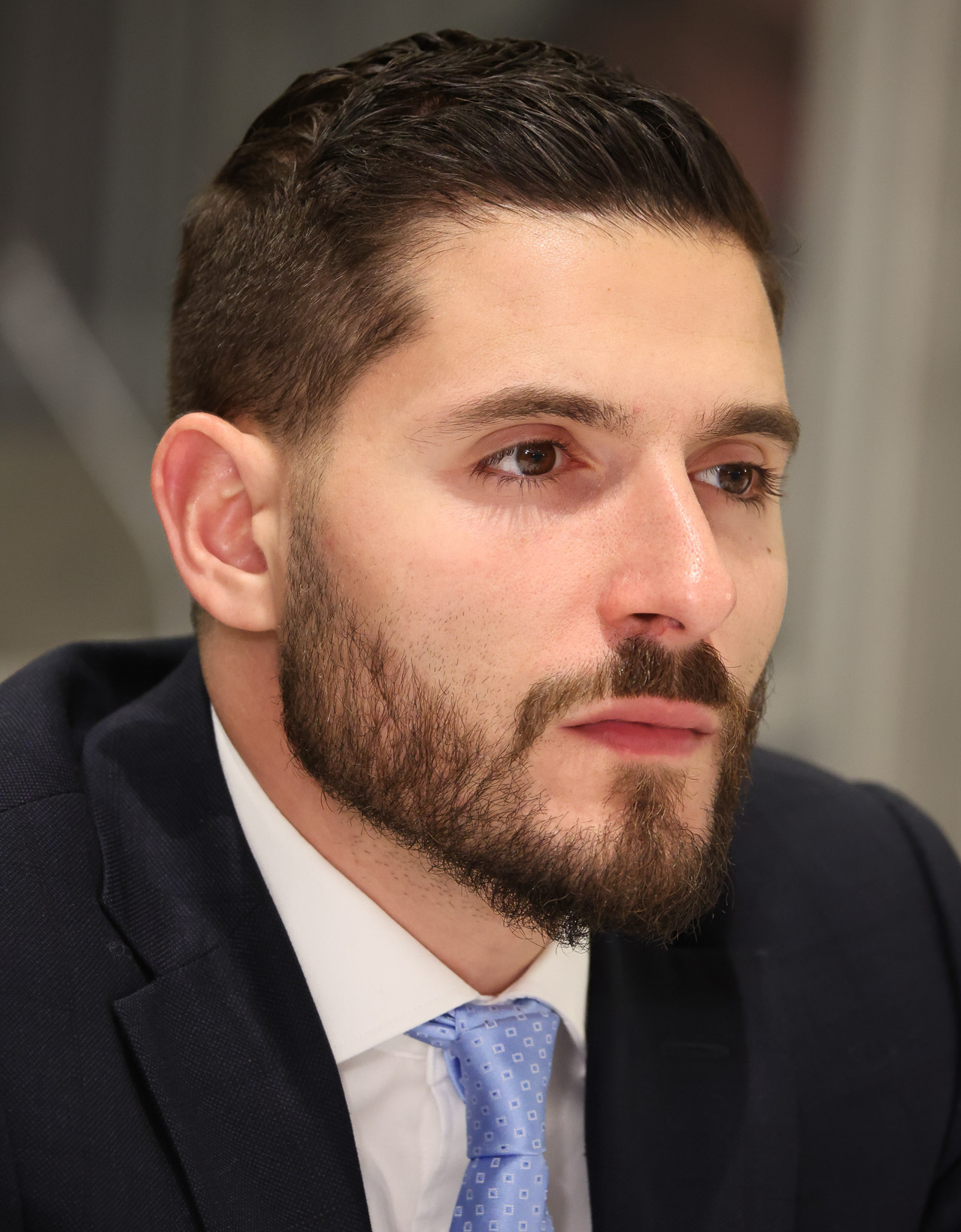
	First party	Second party
Leader	Robert Abela	Alex Borg
Party	Labour	Nationalist
Last election	55.11%, 44 seats	41.74%, 35 seats
Seats won	42	37
Seat change	▼2	▲2
Popular vote	158,444	136,723
Percentage	51.77%	44.68%
Swing	▼3.34pp	▲2.94pp
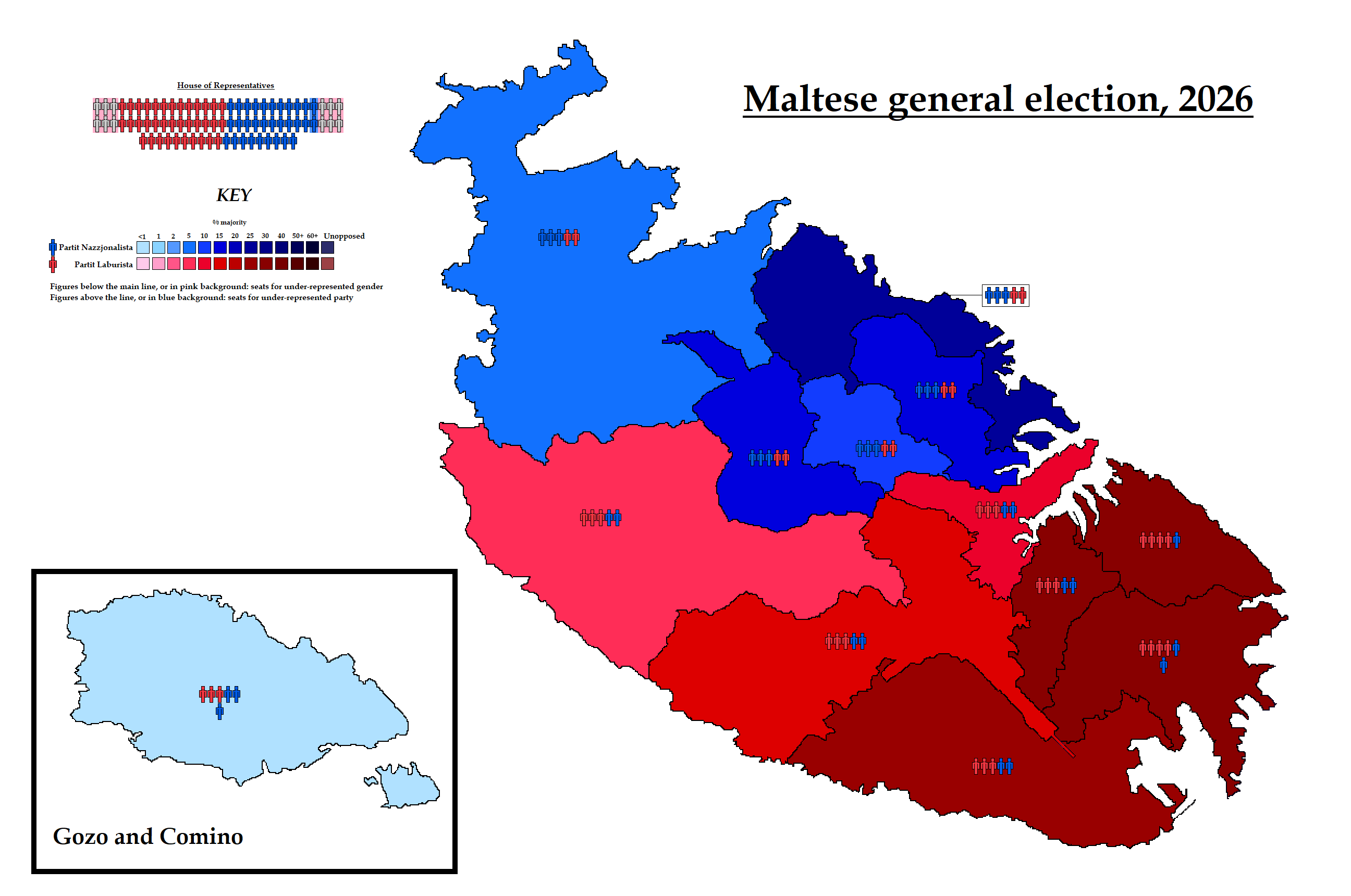
Prime Minister before election
Robert Abela
Labour
Elected Prime Minister
Robert Abela
Labour

General elections were held in Malta on 30 May 2026, with 356,832 registered voters entitled to vote to elect all members of the House of Representatives. The ruling Labour Party led by Robert Abela won the election, securing 36 seats with 52% of the first preference vote. The party became the first to win four consecutive elections, in spite of its vote share declining by three percentage points from the 2022 election. The Nationalist Party, led by Alex Borg, won 29 seats with 45% of the vote, narrowing the gap between the two parties from 39,474 votes in the 2022 election to 21,721. The Nationalist Party received 2 additional seats through the Proportionality Corrective Mechanism, for a total of 31 seats. Both parties received 6 additional seats each through the Gender Corrective Mechanism, resulting in a Labour Party total of 42 seats, and a Nationalist Party total of 37 seats.

== Background ==
The previous elections in March 2022 saw the Labour Party, which has governed the country since 2013, receive 55% of the popular vote and win 44 out of 79 seats in the House of Representatives. Robert Abela, the prime minister and leader of the Labour Party since 2020, and his new cabinet were sworn in on 30 March 2022. Bernard Grech, the leader of the Nationalist Party, was re-elected unopposed in May 2022. The current Leader of the Opposition is Alex Borg, leader of the Nationalist Party, since 10 September 2025. The election was announced following a deal to transfer Manoel Island back to the Maltese government, and in the context of the ongoing war in Iran.

Despite media speculation for months that Abela was considering calling a snap election, Abela repeatedly denied the rumours. On 22 March, Abela unveiled a focus on a "stronger Malta" for Labour's forthcoming manifesto in a speech to supporters. Following hints during his Freedom Day speech of an impending election, the Labour Party held a Congress from 12 to 17 April in which the election manifesto guidelines were approved by the party's members.

In an address on national television, Abela announced a snap election for 30 May 2026, surprisingly citing geopolitical instability as requiring a new mandate from the Maltese people.

=== Parliamentary parties before the election ===
The table below lists parties represented in the House of Representatives after the 2022 general election.

Name	Ideology	Political position	Leader	2022 result		Seats at dissolution	
Name	Ideology	Political position	Leader	Votes (%)	Seats	Seats at dissolution	
Labour Party (PL)	Social democracy	Centre-left	Robert Abela	55.11%	44 / 79	43 / 79	▼1
Nationalist Party (PN)	Christian Democracy	Centre-right	Alex Borg	41.74%	35 / 79	35 / 79	Steady
Independents (Note: Clayton Bartolo (Note: Expelled from the Labour Party parliamentary group))						1 / 79	▲1

== Electoral system ==
MPs are elected from 13 five-seat constituencies by single transferable vote using optional preferential voting. Candidates who pass the Droop quota in the first round are elected, and any surplus votes transferred to the remaining candidates, who will be elected if this enables them to pass the quota. The lowest ranked candidates are then eliminated one-by-one with their preferences transferred to other candidates, who are elected as they pass the quotient, until all five seats are filled. If only two parties obtain seats, if the party which wins a majority of first preference votes fails to achieve a parliamentary majority, it is awarded additional seats to ensure a one-seat majority.

In 2018, the Parliament of Malta lowered the national voting age to 16. During the 2017–2022 legislature a gender-corrective mechanism was introduced, with Article 52(A) of the Constitution stating that provides for up to 12 additional seats for unelected candidates from "the under-represented sex" in case one of both makes up less than 40% of the elected MPs. Candidates are allowed to run in two different constituencies, and if elected in both, they must vacate one of the seats. Their replacement is chosen by a "casual election", in which the votes for the vacating candidate are redistributed.

Despite conducting elections under a proportional ranked preferential system, Malta has a stable two-party system, with only the Labour Party and Nationalist Party having a proven realistic chance of forming a government. Prior to the 2017 election, when the Democratic Party won two seats while running in a joint list with the Nationalist Party, the last time a party/parties other than the Labour Party or the Nationalist Party won seats were the pro-Church parties in alliance with the Nationalist Party in 1962.

== Timetable ==
Date	Event
27 April	Prime Minister Robert Abela announces a snap election and requests a dissolution of Parliament from President Myriam Spiteri Debono.; Labour Party and Nationalist Party announce their respective campaign slogans.
28 April	Former Affordable Housing Minister Roderick Galdes formally challenges the desicion by the Labour Party Executive to bar him from running due to a previous scandal which forced his resignation.; The Labour Party reiterates its first few proposals concerning parental and youth relief from their upcoming manifesto during a press conference and during a mass meeting in Żejtun; The Nationalist Party announce its first healthcare-related proposals from their upcoming manifesto during a mass meeting in Pieta.; Imperium Europa is banned from Instagram.
29 April	Momentum announces that Professor Pierre Schembri-Wismayer will be contesting on their ticket.; Alex Borg visited Maritime MT.; Prime Minister Robert Abela met Roderick Galdes in private discussion.; Robert Abela attends an interview in Sannat, Gozo, where he announces that the Labour manifesto will hold 100 Gozo-related promises, including a 45 million euro interconnector, the modernisation of all their schools and road reparations.; Nationalist Party holds rally in Mellieħa, where Alex Borg promises minimum-wage stipends for healthcare students, an overall 25% increase in stipends, and heavy tax incentives for returning healthcare expats.
30 April	Momentum unveiled their candidates for all 13 districts.; Robert Abela announces a third interconnector between Malta and Sicily which would cost €600 million.; AD+PD calls out the interconnector project as a 'false promise'.
1 May	Labour Party holds flagship May Day mass rally in Castille Square, Valletta.; Nationalist Party holds flagship May Day mass rally in Ħal Lija.
2 May	Malta Chamber of Commerce calls out Robert Abela's proposals on the economy as 'Populist'.; The Nationalist Party announced that it would make Gozo a region.
3 May	Nationalist Pary holds rally in Bormla, where Alex Borg promised to cut energy bills by a third.; Labour Party holds rally in Naxxar. During the rally Robert Abela pledged to increase children's allowance and in-work benefits.
4 May	Nationalist Party holds rally in Żurrieq.; Labour Party holds rally in Santa Venera.
5 May	Labour Party holds rally in Siġġewi.; Nationalist Party holds rally in Ħ'Attard.
6 May	Labour Party holds discussion in Santa Luċija.; Nationalist Party holds rally in Birkirkara.
8 May	Labour Party holds rally in Xagħra, Gozo.
10 May	Labour Party holds rally in Bormla, outside the Kottonera Sports Complex.; Nationalist Party holds rally in Siġġiewi.
13 May	Nationalist Party holds rally in Ħal-Qormi.
14 May	Nationalist Party holds rally in Paola.
15 May	Nationalist Party holds discussion in Swieqi.
16 May	Nationalist Party holds rally in Munxar, Gozo.
17 May	Labour Party holds rally in Mqabba.; Nationalist Party holds discussion in Ħaż-Żebbuġ.; Nationalist Party holds mass meeting in Mosta.
18 May	University debate is held; featuring Robert Abela, Alex Borg, Sandra Gauci, Arnold Cassola and Paul Salomone.; Nationalist Party holds a meeting of the general council at the Party Headquarters in Pieta.
19 May	Nationalist Party holds rally in St. Paul's Bay next to Wignacourt Tower.
20 May	Nationalist Party holds rally in Mqabba.
28 May	Labour Party holds rally in Floriana.; Nationalist Party holds rally in Luxol – Pembroke.
29 May – Silent Day / election silence.
30 May – Election Day
31 May – Counting and Results
Labour Party declares victory, details unclear. Vote gap is being disputed.
Swearing in – Oath of New Prime Minister
1 June	Robert Abela is sworn in as the new Prime Minister of Malta.
	New Cabinet
3 June	Robert Abela announces new cabinet to form part of the Maltese Government.

== Participating parties ==
Name	Founded	Leader(s)	Main ideology	Political position
Labour Party	1921	Robert Abela	Social democracy	Centre-left
Nationalist Party	1926	Alex Borg	Christian Democracy	Centre-right
AD+PD	2020	Sandra Gauci	Green politics	Centre-left
Momentum	2025	Arnold Cassola	Centrism	Centre
Aħwa Maltin	2020	Paul Salomone	Right-wing populism	Right-wing to Far-right
Imperium Europa	2000	Eman Cross	Ultranationalism	Far-right

Volt Malta stated they would not participate in the election, and would instead "support progressive and moderate third-party and independent voices".

== Candidates ==
=== MPs not running for re-election ===
MPs not running for re-election
Party	MP	District	First elected
Independent (ex-Labour)	Clayton Bartolo	12	2017
Labour	Christopher Agius	2	1996
Labour	Stefan Zrinzo Azzopardi	5	2017
Labour	Aaron Farrugia	1	2017
Labour	Michael Farrugia	12	1992
Labour	Roderick Galdes	6	2003
Labour	Edward Zammit Lewis	8	1996
Nationalist	David Agius	11	2003
Nationalist	Karol Aquilina	9	2017
Nationalist	Ivan J. Bartolo	9	2017
Nationalist	Claudette Buttigieg	8	2013
Nationalist	Ryan Callus	6	2013
Nationalist	Robert Cutajar	12	2013
Nationalist	Mario de Marco	1	2003
Nationalist	Carmelo Mifsud Bonnici	3	1998
Nationalist	Chris Said	13 – Gozo	2008

=== Party totals ===
The Labour Party, Nationalist Party, AD+PD, Momentum and Aħwa Maltin fielded candidates in all 13 constituencies. Imperium Europa fielded their leader Eman Cross in two constituencies. Two independent candidates also ran. Since candidates are allowed to contest two different constituencies, some parties have fewer candidates than constituencies.

Parties	Candidates	Constituencies
Labour	72	13
Nationalist	65	13
AD+PD	8	13
Momentum	7	13
Aħwa Maltin	7	13
Imperium Europa	1	2
Independent	2	3

=== Summary table ===
Key:

*: Outgoing MP, not necessarily elected from this district.
#: Party leader

Candidates in the 2026 Maltese general election
Constituency	Labour	Nationalist	AD+PD	Momentum	Aħwa Maltin	Imperium Europa	Independent
District 1 (5 seats)	Keith Azzopardi Tanti; Glenn Bedingfield; Cressida Galea; Davina Sammut Hili; Fleur Abela; Yana Borg Debono Grech; Joseph Bugeja; Jude-Taddeo Debattista; John Grech; Olaf McKay; Nigel Vella; Francesca Zarb	Darren Carabott; Paula Mifsud Bonnici; Justin Schembri; Antonello Cuschieri; James Ellul; Alex Perici Calascione	Mark Zerafa	Billy McBee	Giuseppe Aquilina; Francis Mallia	Eman Cross	
District 2 (5 seats)	Carmelo Abela; Robert Abela; Glenn Bedingfield; Byron Camilleri; Clyde Caruana; Amanda Spiteri Grech; Alison Zerafa Civelli; Clinton-Domenic Azzopardi Flores; Jesmond Bonello; Georvin Bugeja; Martina Buhagiar; Edward Cassar Delia; James Grech; Jorge Grech; Shana Woods; Rodrick Zerafa	Bernice Bonello; Stephen Spiteri; John Baptist Camilleri; Leone Sciberras	Mario Mallia	Matthew Agius	Paul Salomone		
District 3 (5 seats)	Carmelo Abela; Ray Abela; Chris Bonett; Owen Bonnici; Alicia Bugeja Said; Andy Ellul; Chris Fearne; Martina Buhagiar; James Grech; Eric Plumpton	Janice Abela Chetcuti; Stephen Spiteri; Andrew Agius; John Baptist Camilleri; Miriana Calleja Testaferrata de Noto; Errol Cutajar; Raymond Gatt; Leone Sciberras	Brain Decelis	Mark Camilleri Gambin	Marrianne Sacco		Nazzareno Bonnici (Tal-Ajkla)
District 4 (5 seats)	Ray Abela; Jonathan Attard; Chris Bonett; Byron Camilleri; Katya De Giovanni; Andy Ellul; Chris Fearne; Amanda Spiteri Grech; Eric Plumpton; Shana Woods	Bernice Bonello; Mark Anthony Sammut; Duncan Borg Myatt; Stefan Caruana; Michael Piccinino	Brain Decelis	Alastair Farrugia	Giuseppe Aquilina		
District 5 (5 seats)	Robert Abela; Owen Bonnici; Miriam Dalli; Julia Farrugia Portelli; Omar Farrugia; Remenda Grech; Kaydem Schembri; Rodrick Zerafa	Toni Bezzina; Stanley Zammit; Conrad Borg Manché; Duncan Borg Myatt; Miriana Calleja Testaferrata de Noto; Stefan Caruana; Oliver Cini; Owen Sciberras	Melissa Bagley	Alastair Farrugia	Iris Vella		
District 6 (5 seats)	Malcolm Paul Agius Galea; Ramona Attard; Ian Borg; Rosianne Cutajar; Omar Farrugia; Omar Rababah; Saviour Schembri	Jerome Caruana Cilia; Frederick Aquilina; Julian Borg; Annabelle Cilia; Oliver Cini; George Muscat; George Vital Zammit	Sandra Gauci	Billy McBee	Marrianne Sacco		Noel Apap; Nazzareno Bonnici (Tal-Ajkla)
District 7 (5 seats)	Anthony Agius Decelis; Malcolm Paul Agius Galea; Ian Borg; Naomi Cachia; Julia Farrugia Portelli; Samantha Pace Gasan; Omar Rababah; Saviour Schembri	Charles Azzopardi; Rebekah Borg; Adrian Delia; Ian Vassallo Hagi; Andrew Agius; Paul Mazzola; Anthony Mifsud	Carmel Cacopardo	Pierre Schembri Wismayer	Iris Vella		Noel Apap
District 8 (5 seats)	Ramona Attard; Keith Azzopardi Tanti; Clyde Caruana; Cressida Galea; Alex Muscat; Vania Agius Tabone; Yana Borg Debono Grech; Jesmond Bonello; Joseph Bugeja; Rosette Cassar; John Grech	Ivan Castillo; Adrian Delia; Beppe Fenech Adami; Justin Schembri; Julie Zahra; Ludwig Cauchi; Edmond Cuschieri; Angelo Micallef; George Muscat; David Pace Ross	Mario Mallia	Matthew Agius	Francis Mallia		
District 9 (5 seats)	Rebecca Buttigieg; Michael Falzon; Clifton Grima; Vania Agius Tabone; Clinton-Domenic Azzopardi Flores; Miguel Balzan; Tania Borg; Lorna Borg Vassallo; David Caruana; Lisa Cassar Shaw; Mariah Meli	Graziella Attard Previ; Graham Bencini; Eve Borg Bonello; Albert Buttigieg; Beppe Fenech Adami; Joe Giglio; Julie Zahra; Joseph Aquilina; James Ellul; Marilena Gauci; Jonathan Muscat; Noel Muscat; Alex Perici Calascione; Charles Selvaggi	Mark Zerafa	Arnold Cassola	Josephine Borg	Eman Cross	
District 10 (5 seats)	Jo Etienne Abela; Rebecca Buttigieg; Katya De Giovanni; Michael Falzon; Clifton Grima; Miguel Balzan; Tania Borg; Lorna Borg Vassallo; David Caruana; Rosette Cassar; Edward Cassar Delia; Lisa Cassar Shaw; Mariah Meli; Deborah Schembri; Damian Spiteri	Janice Abela Chetcuti; Graziella Attard Previ; Graham Bencini; Eve Borg Bonello; Albert Buttigieg; Graziella Galea; Joe Giglio; Mark Anthony Sammut; Joseph Aquilina; David Bonello; Conrad Borg Manché; Errol Cutajar; Raymond Gatt; Marilena Gauci; Noel Muscat; Rachel Williams	Marcus Lauri	Arnold Cassola; Pierre Schembri Wismayer	Josephine Borg		
District 11 (5 seats)	Anthony Agius Decelis; Romilda Baldacchino Zarb; Miriam Dalli; Alex Muscat; Francesca Zarb	Ivan Bartolo; Rebekah Borg; Bernard Grech; Spiridione Borg; Edmond Cuschieri; Joseph Grech	Carmel Cacopardo	Mark Camilleri Gambin	Simon Elmer		
District 12 (5 seats)	Jonathan Attard; Romilda Baldacchino Zarb; Alicia Bugeja Said; Naomi Cachia; Rosianne Cutajar; Franco Mercieca; Deborah Schembri; Damian Spiteri; Carlos Zarb	Charles Azzopardi; Alex Borg; Ivan Castillo; Graziella Galea; Ian Vassallo Hagi; David Bonello; Joseph Grech; Anthony Mifsud; Jonathan Muscat; George Vital Zammit; Rachel Williams	Sandra Gauci; Luke Caruana	Carmel Asciak	Simon Elmer		
District 13 (5 seats)	Jo Etienne Abela; Abigail Camilleri; Clint Camilleri; Anton Refalo; George Camilleri	Alex Borg; Norma Camilleri; Beppe Galea; Luke Said; Frank-Anthony Tabone	Luke Caruana	Carmel Asciak	Paul Salomone		

=== Tables by party ===
Note: Candidates are listed in alphabetical order, identical to ballot paper order.

==== Labour Party ====
2026 Maltese general election Labour Party candidates			
District 1 FIVE seats	Ray Abela	District 7 FIVE seats	Anthony Agius Decelis
District 1 FIVE seats	Keith Azzopardi Tanti	District 7 FIVE seats	Malcolm Paul Agius Galea
District 1 FIVE seats	Glenn Bedingfield	District 7 FIVE seats	Ian Borg
District 1 FIVE seats	Cressida Galea	District 7 FIVE seats	Naomi Cachia
District 1 FIVE seats	Davina Sammut Hili	District 7 FIVE seats	Julia Farrugia Portelli
District 1 FIVE seats	Fleur Abela	District 7 FIVE seats	Samantha Pace Gasan
District 1 FIVE seats	Yana Borg Debono Grech	District 7 FIVE seats	Omar Rababah
District 1 FIVE seats	Joseph Bugeja	District 7 FIVE seats	Saviour Schembri
District 1 FIVE seats	Jude-Taddeo Debattista	District 8 FIVE seats	Ramona Attard
District 1 FIVE seats	John Grech	District 8 FIVE seats	Keith Azzopardi Tanti
District 1 FIVE seats	Olaf McKay	District 8 FIVE seats	Clyde Caruana
District 1 FIVE seats	Nigel Vella	District 8 FIVE seats	Cressida Galea
District 1 FIVE seats	Francesca Zarb	District 8 FIVE seats	Alex Muscat
District 2 FIVE seats	Carmelo Abela	District 8 FIVE seats	Vania Agius Tabone
District 2 FIVE seats	PM Robert Abela	District 8 FIVE seats	Yana Borg Debono Grech
District 2 FIVE seats	Glenn Bedingfield	District 8 FIVE seats	Jesmond Bonello
District 2 FIVE seats	Byron Camilleri	District 8 FIVE seats	Joseph Bugeja
District 2 FIVE seats	Clyde Caruana	District 8 FIVE seats	Rosette Cassar
District 2 FIVE seats	Amanda Spiteri Grech	District 8 FIVE seats	John Grech
District 2 FIVE seats	Clinton-Domenic Azzopardi Flores	District 9 FIVE seats	Rebecca Buttigieg
District 2 FIVE seats	Jesmond Bonello	District 9 FIVE seats	Michael Falzon
District 2 FIVE seats	Georvin Bugeja	District 9 FIVE seats	Clifton Grima
District 2 FIVE seats	Martina Buhagiar	District 9 FIVE seats	Vania Agius Tabone
District 2 FIVE seats	Edward Cassar Delia	District 9 FIVE seats	Clinton-Domenic Azzopardi Flores
District 2 FIVE seats	James Grech	District 9 FIVE seats	Miguel Balzan
District 2 FIVE seats	Jorge Grech	District 9 FIVE seats	Tania Borg
District 2 FIVE seats	Shana Woods	District 9 FIVE seats	Lorna Borg Vassallo
District 2 FIVE seats	Rodrick Zerafa	District 9 FIVE seats	David Caruana
District 3 FIVE seats	Carmelo Abela	District 9 FIVE seats	Lisa Cassar Shaw
District 3 FIVE seats	Ray Abela	District 9 FIVE seats	Mariah Meli
District 3 FIVE seats	Chris Bonett	District 10 FIVE seats	Jo Etienne Abela
District 3 FIVE seats	Owen Bonnici	District 10 FIVE seats	Rebecca Buttigieg
District 3 FIVE seats	Alicia Bugeja Said	District 10 FIVE seats	Katya De Giovanni
District 3 FIVE seats	Andy Ellul	District 10 FIVE seats	Michael Falzon
District 3 FIVE seats	Martina Buhagiar	District 10 FIVE seats	Clifton Grima
District 3 FIVE seats	James Grech	District 10 FIVE seats	Miguel Balzan
District 3 FIVE seats	Eric Plumpton	District 10 FIVE seats	Tania Borg
District 4 FIVE seats	Ray Abela	District 10 FIVE seats	Lorna Borg Vassallo
District 4 FIVE seats	Jonathan Attard	District 10 FIVE seats	David Caruana
District 4 FIVE seats	Chris Bonett	District 10 FIVE seats	Rosette Cassar
District 4 FIVE seats	Byron Camilleri	District 10 FIVE seats	Edward Cassar Delia
District 4 FIVE seats	Katya De Giovanni	District 10 FIVE seats	Lisa Cassar Shaw
District 4 FIVE seats	Andy Ellul	District 10 FIVE seats	Mariah Meli
District 4 FIVE seats	Chris Fearne	District 10 FIVE seats	Deborah Schembri
District 4 FIVE seats	Amanda Spiteri Grech	District 10 FIVE seats	Damian Spiteri
District 4 FIVE seats	Eric Plumpton	District 11 FIVE seats	Anthony Agius Decelis
District 4 FIVE seats	Shana Woods	District 11 FIVE seats	Romilda Baldacchino Zarb
District 5 FIVE seats	PM Robert Abela	District 11 FIVE seats	Miriam Dalli
District 5 FIVE seats	Owen Bonnici	District 11 FIVE seats	Alex Muscat
District 5 FIVE seats	Miriam Dalli	District 11 FIVE seats	Francesca Zarb
District 5 FIVE seats	Julia Farrugia Portelli	District 12 FIVE seats	Jonathan Attard
District 5 FIVE seats	Omar Farrugia	District 12 FIVE seats	Romilda Baldacchino Zarb
District 5 FIVE seats	Remenda Grech	District 12 FIVE seats	Alicia Bugeja Said
District 5 FIVE seats	Kaydem Schembri	District 12 FIVE seats	Naomi Cachia
District 5 FIVE seats	Rodrick Zerafa	District 12 FIVE seats	Rosianne Cutajar
District 6 FIVE seats	Malcolm Paul Agius Galea	District 12 FIVE seats	Franco Mercieca
District 6 FIVE seats	Ramona Attard	District 12 FIVE seats	Deborah Schembri
District 6 FIVE seats	Ian Borg	District 12 FIVE seats	Damian Spiteri
District 6 FIVE seats	Rosianne Cutajar	District 12 FIVE seats	Carlos Zarb
District 6 FIVE seats	Omar Farrugia	District 13 FIVE seats	Jo Etienne Abela
District 6 FIVE seats	Omar Rababah	District 13 FIVE seats	Abigail Camilleri
District 6 FIVE seats	Saviour Schembri	District 13 FIVE seats	Clint Camilleri
District 6 FIVE seats	Saviour Schembri	District 13 FIVE seats	Anton Refalo
District 6 FIVE seats	Saviour Schembri	District 13 FIVE seats	George Camilleri

==== Nationalist Party ====
2026 Maltese general election Nationalist Party candidates			
District 1 FIVE seats	Darren Carabott	District 9 FIVE seats	Graziella Attard Previ
District 1 FIVE seats	Paula Mifsud Bonnici	District 9 FIVE seats	Graham Bencini
District 1 FIVE seats	Justin Schembri	District 9 FIVE seats	Eve Borg Bonello
District 1 FIVE seats	Antonello Cuschieri	District 9 FIVE seats	Albert Buttigieg
District 1 FIVE seats	James Aaron Ellul	District 9 FIVE seats	Beppe Fenech Adami
District 1 FIVE seats	Alex Perici Calascione	District 9 FIVE seats	Joe Giglio
District 2 FIVE seats	Bernice Bonello	District 9 FIVE seats	Julie Zahra
District 2 FIVE seats	Stephen Spiteri	District 9 FIVE seats	Joseph Aquilina
District 2 FIVE seats	John Baptist Camilleri	District 9 FIVE seats	James Aaron Ellul
District 2 FIVE seats	Leone Sciberras	District 9 FIVE seats	Marilena Gauci
District 3 FIVE seats	Janice Chetcuti	District 9 FIVE seats	Jonathan Muscat
District 3 FIVE seats	Stephen Spiteri	District 9 FIVE seats	Noel Muscat
District 3 FIVE seats	Andrew Agius	District 9 FIVE seats	Alex Perici Calascione
District 3 FIVE seats	John Baptist Camilleri	District 9 FIVE seats	Charles Selvaggi
District 3 FIVE seats	Miriana Calleja Testaferrata de Noto	District 10 FIVE seats	Janice Chetcuti
District 3 FIVE seats	Errol Cutajar	District 10 FIVE seats	Graziella Attard Previ
District 3 FIVE seats	Raymond Gatt	District 10 FIVE seats	Graham Bencini
District 3 FIVE seats	Leone Sciberras	District 10 FIVE seats	Eve Borg Bonello
District 4 FIVE seats	Bernice Bonello	District 10 FIVE seats	Albert Buttigieg
District 4 FIVE seats	Mark Anthony Sammut	District 10 FIVE seats	Graziella Galea
District 4 FIVE seats	Duncan Borg Myatt	District 10 FIVE seats	Joe Giglio
District 4 FIVE seats	Stefan Caruana	District 10 FIVE seats	Mark Anthony Sammut
District 4 FIVE seats	Michael Piccinino	District 10 FIVE seats	Joseph Aquilina
District 5 FIVE seats	Toni Bezzina	District 10 FIVE seats	David Bonello
District 5 FIVE seats	Stanley Zammit	District 10 FIVE seats	Conrad Borg Manché
District 5 FIVE seats	Conrad Borg Manché	District 10 FIVE seats	Errol Cutajar
District 5 FIVE seats	Duncan Borg Myatt	District 10 FIVE seats	Raymond Gatt
District 5 FIVE seats	Miriana Calleja Testaferrata de Noto	District 10 FIVE seats	Marilena Gauci
District 5 FIVE seats	Stefan Caruana	District 10 FIVE seats	Noel Muscat
District 5 FIVE seats	Oliver Cini	District 10 FIVE seats	Rachel Williams
District 5 FIVE seats	Owen Sciberras	District 11 FIVE seats	Ivan Bartolo
District 6 FIVE seats	Jerome Caruana Cilia	District 11 FIVE seats	Rebekah Borg
District 6 FIVE seats	Frederick Aquilina	District 11 FIVE seats	Bernard Grech
District 6 FIVE seats	Julian Borg	District 11 FIVE seats	Spiridione Borg
District 6 FIVE seats	Annabelle Cilia	District 11 FIVE seats	Edmond Cuschieri
District 6 FIVE seats	Oliver Cini	District 11 FIVE seats	Joseph Grech
District 6 FIVE seats	George Muscat	District 12 FIVE seats	Charles Azzopardi
District 6 FIVE seats	George Vital Zammit	District 12 FIVE seats	LO Alex Borg
District 7 FIVE seats	Charles Azzopardi	District 12 FIVE seats	Ivan Castillo
District 7 FIVE seats	Rebekah Borg	District 12 FIVE seats	Graziella Galea
District 7 FIVE seats	Adrian Delia	District 12 FIVE seats	Ian Mario Vassallo
District 7 FIVE seats	Ian Mario Vassallo	District 12 FIVE seats	David Bonello
District 7 FIVE seats	Andrew Agius	District 12 FIVE seats	Joseph Grech
District 7 FIVE seats	Paul Mazzola	District 12 FIVE seats	Anthony Mifsud
District 7 FIVE seats	Anthony Mifsud	District 12 FIVE seats	Jonathan Muscat
District 8 FIVE seats	Ivan Castillo	District 12 FIVE seats	George Vital Zammit
District 8 FIVE seats	Adrian Delia	District 12 FIVE seats	Rachel Williams
District 8 FIVE seats	Beppe Fenech Adami	District 13 (Gozo at-large) FIVE seats	LO Alex Borg
District 8 FIVE seats	Justin Schembri	District 13 (Gozo at-large) FIVE seats	Norma Camilleri
District 8 FIVE seats	Julie Zahra	District 13 (Gozo at-large) FIVE seats	Beppe Galea
District 8 FIVE seats	Ludwig Cauchi	District 13 (Gozo at-large) FIVE seats	Luke Said
District 8 FIVE seats	Edmond Cuschieri	District 13 (Gozo at-large) FIVE seats	Frank-Anthony Tabone
District 8 FIVE seats	Angelo Micallef		
District 8 FIVE seats	George Muscat		
District 8 FIVE seats	David Pace Ross		

==== AD+PD ====
2026 Maltese general election AD+PD – The Green Party candidates			
District 1 FIVE seats	Mark Zerafa	District 8 FIVE seats	Mario Mallia
District 2 FIVE seats	Mario Mallia	District 9 FIVE seats	Mark Zerafa
District 3 FIVE seats	Brian Decelis	District 10 FIVE seats	Marcus Lauri
District 4 FIVE seats	Brian Decelis	District 11 FIVE seats	Carmel Cacopardo
District 5 FIVE seats	Melissa Bagley	District 12 FIVE seats	Sandra Gauci
District 5 FIVE seats	Melissa Bagley	District 12 FIVE seats	Luke Caruana
District 6 FIVE seats	Sandra Gauci	District 13 (Gozo at-large) FIVE seats	Luke Caruana
District 7 FIVE seats	Carmel Cacopardo		

==== Momentum ====
2026 Maltese general election Momentum Party candidates			
District 1 FIVE seats	Billy Joe McBee	District 8 FIVE seats	Matthew Agius
District 2 FIVE seats	Matthew Agius	District 9 FIVE seats	Arnold Cassola
District 3 FIVE seats	Mark Camilleri Gambin	District 10 FIVE seats	Arnold Cassola
District 3 FIVE seats	Mark Camilleri Gambin	District 10 FIVE seats	Pierre Schembri Wismayer
District 4 FIVE seats	Alastair Farrugia	District 11 FIVE seats	Mark Camilleri Gambin
District 5 FIVE seats	Alastair Farrugia	District 12 FIVE seats	Carmel Asciak
District 6 FIVE seats	Billy Joe McBee	District 13 (Gozo at-large) FIVE seats	Carmel Asciak
District 7 FIVE seats	Pierre Schembri Wismayer		

==== Aħwa Maltin ====
2026 Maltese general election Aħwa Maltin candidates			
District 1 FIVE seats	Giuseppe Aquilina	District 8 FIVE seats	Francis Mallia
District 1 FIVE seats	Francis Mallia	District 8 FIVE seats	Francis Mallia
District 2 FIVE seats	Paul Salomone	District 9 FIVE seats	Josephine Borg
District 3 FIVE seats	Marrianne Sacco	District 10 FIVE seats	Josephine Borg
District 4 FIVE seats	Giuseppe Aquilina	District 11 FIVE seats	Simon Elmer
District 5 FIVE seats	Iris Vella	District 12 FIVE seats	Simon Elmer
District 6 FIVE seats	Marrianne Sacco	District 13 (Gozo at-large) FIVE seats	Paul Salomone
District 7 FIVE seats	Iris Vella		

==== Imperium Europa ====
Candidate	Districts
Eman Alexander Cross	1 and 9

==== Independents ====
Candidate	Districts
Noel Apap	6 and 7
Nazzareno Bonnici	3 and 6

== Campaign ==
=== Labour Party ===
The Labour Party began its campaign by publishing their slogan Int Malta (You Are Malta) and multiple billboards with the slogan. On 28 April, only a day after the election announcement, Labour held it first mass rally. The party also published a series of proposals such as the increase of maternity and various other leaves. It also included multiple tax reductions and financial support largely aimed at young people, first-time buyers and seniors. On 29 April, the Labour Party announced it would be making Gozo Channel trips free for people, provided they do not bring their car with them, alongside other Gozo-related proposals, including a 45 million euro interconnector, the modernisation of all their schools and road reparations. One of the most important rallies was held on 1 May, which is also Workers' Day where the party announced major promises to the people.

=== Nationalist Party ===
The Nationalist Party started its campaign by announcing their slogan Nifs Ġdid (A Breath of Fresh Air) while also installing billboards and banners with the slogan. On 28 April the party hosted its first Mass Meeting in Pietà, outside of the Party HQ. During the mass meeting the party announced multiple proposals related to healthcare such as a new hospital in the North, a new hospital in Gozo, an expansion of Mater Dei, free cancer treatment, and others. Without any media presence, Alex Borg announced a new set of proposals which ensured that students in secondary education will be offered maritime related courses. He also suggested the reform of Transport Malta. During a rally in Mellieħa, Borg promised minimum-wage stipends for healthcare students, an overall 25% increase in stipends, and heavy tax incentives for returning healthcare expats. On 2 May, the party announced it would make Gozo a region.

=== AD+PD ===
Before the election was announced AD+PD and Momentum announced an electoral agreement. On 28 April, the AD+PD announced its slogan, Ilkoll (All Of Us). The next day, the party announced its candidates for the election which include: Mark Zerafa in the 1st and 9th districts, Mario Mallia in the 2nd and 8th district, Brain Decelis in the 3rd and 4th district, Melissa Bagley in the 5th district, Sandra Gauci in the 6th and 12th district, Carmel Cacopardo in the 7th and 11th district, Marcus Lauri in the 10th district and Luke Caruana in the 12th and 13th districts.

=== Momentum ===
On 28 April, on the same day as the AD+PD, Momentum announced its slogan, Bidla Ta' Veru (Real Change). Apart from Arnold Cassola, leading University of Malta researcher, Professor Pierre Schembri-Wismayer will run on the Momentum ticket. On 30 April, Momentum unveiled its candidates for all13 districts.

=== Aħwa Maltin ===
On 29 April Aħwa Maltin announced they would contest all constituencies under the slogan Malta għall-Maltin (Malta for Maltese). Their campaign has focused on seven key points: protection and support for the family, strict immigration controls, affordable housing, support for small businesses and workers, safeguarding cultural heritage and animal welfare, preservation of the Maltese identity, and tackling the cost of living.

=== Imperium Europa ===
On 28 April Imperium Europa announced that party leader Eman Cross would contest the 1st and 9th districts. This is the first general election the party has run in since 2008, as it had since then focused solely on European Parliament elections. On the same day, Imperium Europa's Instagram account was banned from the platform.

=== Independents ===
Perennial candidate Nazzareno Bonnici, better known as Żaren tal-Ajkla (Żaren of the Eagle), announced that he would be campaigning in the third and sixth districts. Noel Apap also contested as an independent candidate.

=== Party manifestos and slogans ===
Party	Manifesto (external link)	Original slogan	English translation	Refs
Labour Party	Manifesto (in Maltese)	Int Malta	You Are Malta	
Nationalist Party	Manifesto (in English & Maltese)	Nifs Ġdid	A Breath of Fresh Air	
AD+PD	Manifesto (in Maltese)	Ilkoll	All of Us	
Momentum	Manifesto (in English & Maltese)	Bidla ta' Vera	Real Change	
Aħwa Maltin	Manifesto (in Maltese)	Malta Għall-Maltin	Malta for the Maltese	
Imperium Europa	Manifesto (in English)	Salva Pajjiżek	Save your Country	

=== Debates ===
2026 Maltese General Election Debates
Date	Time	Organisers	P Present A Absent invitee N Non-invitee							
Date	Time	Organisers	PL	PN	AD+PD	Momentum	AM	IE	IND	Watch link / Reference:
11 May	9:15 pm	Broadcasting Authority & PBS / TVM Vice leaders' of represented parties debate	P Ian Borg	P Alex Perici Calascione	N	N	N	N	N	
15 May	No data	Broadcasting Authority & PBS / TVM	P Jonathan Attard; Miriam Dalli	P Darren Carabott; Conrad Borg Manché	N	N	N	N	N	
18 May	No data	Broadcasting Authority & PBS / TVM Non-represented parties' press conference	N	N	P	P	P Paul Salomone	P Eman Cross	N	
18 May	2:30 pm	MUDU; Party Leaders Debate	P Robert Abela	P Alex Borg	P Sandra Gauci	P Arnold Cassola	P Paul Salomone	N	N	
19 May	No data	Broadcasting Authority & PBS / TVM	N	N	P Sandra Gauci	P Arnold Cassola	P Paul Salomone	P Eman Cross	N	
19 May	10:00 am	Malta Chamber of SMEs	P Robert Abela	P Alex Borg	N	N	N	N	N	
21 May	9:15 pm	PBS & TVM – XTRA programme	P Robert Abela	P Alex Borg	N	N	N	N	N	
22 May	No data	Broadcasting Authority & PBS / TVM	P Byron Camilleri; Silvio Schembri	P Conrad Borg Manché; Joseph Grech	N	N	N	N	N	
23 May	No data	Broadcasting Authority &PBS / TVM Independent candidates' slot	N	N	N	N	N	N	P Nazzareno Bonnici; Noel Apap	
24 May	No data	The Malta Chamber	P Robert Abela	P Alex Borg	N	N	N	N	N	
25 May	9:00 pm	Il-Każin/Times of Malta	A Robert Abela	P Alex Borg	N	N	N	N	N	
25 May	No data	Broadcasting Authority &PBS / TVM All parties' debate	P Owen Bonnici	P George Vidal Zammit	P Carmel Cacopardo	P Mark Camilleri Gambin	P Simon Elmer	P Eman Cross	N	
26 May	No data	Broadcasting Authority &PBS / TVM Final message by non-represented parties' leaders	N	N	P Sandra Gauci	P Arnold Cassola	P Paul Salomone	P Eman Cross	N	

=== Involvement of A.I. in Campaigning ===
The election is regarded as the first election Malta had in the age of A.I. as edits and A.I. photos and videos filled social media. Less than a day after the announcement of the election, videos and photos aimed at mocking the two parties flooded social media. Most of these photos were centered around the slogans, Nifs Ġdid and Int Malta. Examples of these jokes were 'Int India' or 'You are India' because of the large number of Indian immigrants in the country. On the other hand, photos began circulating of Alex Borg smoking cannabis. A.I. involvement was not reserved to the two main parties, but smaller parties most notably Aħwa Maltin made a short edit showing their leader Paul Salamone being smarter and more competent than Robert Abela.

== Opinion polls ==
Local regression trend line of poll results, with each line corresponding to a political party.

Opinion polling conducted in 2026 has generally shown the Labour Party maintaining a lead over the Nationalist Party, although the margin varies across surveys. A MaltaToday survey conducted in March 2026 placed the Labour Party at approximately 48.2% and the Nationalist Party at 45.6%, indicating a narrow lead. Earlier surveys in January 2026 reported similar results, with Labour polling at around 48.9% and the Nationalist Party at 45.7%. A separate survey conducted by Vincent Marmarà in February 2026 suggested a wider gap when accounting for undecided voters, projecting Labour support at 52.8% compared to around 42.6% for the Nationalist Party.

Cost of living, purchasing power, and the economy are considered significant electoral issues, yet a KPMG report indicates that wages have effectively remained stagnant since 2018.

== Turnout ==
The turnout of the election over the course of the designated four voting days was 87.42%.

=== Overview (3 early voting days + election day) ===
Source: Electoral Commission
District №	Total Registered Voters	Votes Cast	%
1	26,834	23,460	87.43
2	27,347	24,304	88.87
3	27,903	24,641	88.31
4	26,438	23,447	88.69
5	27,353	24,475	89.48
6	26,779	23,805	88.89
7	26,511	23,789	89.73
8	27,882	24,605	88.25
9	27,264	23,302	85.47
10	27,658	22,840	82.58
11	26,687	23,372	87.58
12	26,334	21,434	81.39
13 - Gozo	31,842	28,475	89.43
Average Total Turnout All-Malta:	356,832	311,949	87.42

=== Election day at 14.00 (comparison 2026 and 2022) ===
Note: These values do not include early voting turnout.

Source: Electoral Commission
District №	Turnout 2026	Turnout 2022	Change
1	47.30%	43.85%	▲3.45%
2	43.39%	38.26%	▲5.13%
3	42.39%	38.87%	▲3.52%
4	44.41%	42.81%	▲1.60%
5	43.22%	40.23%	▲2.99%
6	42.70%	39.32%	▲3.38%
7	42.64%	39.05%	▲3.59%
8	46.46%	42.55%	▲3.91%
9	46.02%	42.47%	▲3.55%
10	42.58%	41.47%	▲1.11%
11	42.87%	39.28%	▲3.59%
12	39.76%	37.72%	▲2.04%
13 - Gozo	42.95%	40.50%	▲2.45%
Average Turnout All-Malta:	43.59%	40.50%	▲3.1%

== Results ==
The Labour Party secured a fourth consecutive election victory on 31 May, winning 51.8% of the vote and a majority of 21,721 votes. The Nationalist Party received the support of 44.7% of the electorate, while third parties collectively obtained 3.5%. The Labour Party dominated in the south of the island of Malta and maintained their growing support in the capital Valletta and Floriana, while the Nationalist Party dominated in the north of the island of Malta and narrowly flipped Gozo which had voted Labour in the prior two elections.

Graph of the party split among 79 seats.
Party	Votes	%	+/–	Seats	+/–
Labour Party	158,444	51.77	–3.34	42	–2
Nationalist Party	136,723	44.68	+2.94	37	+2
Momentum	4,700	1.54	New	0	New
AD+PD	3,996	1.31	–0.30	0	0
Aħwa Maltin	1,845	0.60	+0.08	0	0
Imperium Europa	167	0.05	New	0	New
Independents	161	0.05	–0.38	0	0
Total	306,036	100.00	–	79	0
Valid votes	306,036	98.05			
Invalid/blank votes	6,093	1.95			
Total votes	312,129	100.00			
Registered voters/turnout	356,832	87.47			
Source: Electoral Commission, Times of Malta

=== By district ===
==== District 1 ====
Party	Votes	%	+/–	Seats	+/–
Labour Party	12,734	55.23	–4.84	3	–2
Nationalist Party	9,674	41.96	+4.40	2	–1
AD+PD	203	0.88	–0.25	0	0
Momentum	194	0.84	New	0	0
Aħwa Maltin	148	0.64	0	0	0
Imperium Europa	105	0.46	New	0	0
Total	23,058	100.00	–	5	–3
Valid votes	23,058	98.35			
Invalid/blank votes	386	1.65			
Total votes	23,444	100.00			
Registered voters/turnout	26,834	87.37			

==== District 2 ====
Party	Votes	%	Seats	+/–
Labour Party	16,025	67.15	4	0
Nationalist Party	7,092	29.72	1	0
AD+PD	317	1.33	–	–
Momentum	224	0.94	–	–
Aħwa Maltin	208	0.87	–	–
Total	23,866	100.00	5	0
Valid votes	23,866	98.08		
Invalid/blank votes	466	1.92		
Total votes	24,332	100.00		
Registered voters/turnout	27,347	88.98		

==== District 3 ====
One additional proportional seat was awarded to the Nationalist Party.

Party	Votes	%	Seats	+/–
Labour Party	15,843	65.55	4	0
Nationalist Party	7,410	30.66	2	+1
Momentum	440	1.82	–	–
AD+PD	258	1.07	–	–
Aħwa Maltin	143	0.59	–	–
Nazzareno Bonnici	77	0.32	–	–
Total	24,171	100.00	6	+1
Valid votes	24,171	98.10		
Invalid/blank votes	469	1.90		
Total votes	24,640	100.00		
Registered voters/turnout	27,903	88.31		

==== District 4 ====
Party	Votes	%	Seats	+/–
Labour Party	14,810	64.39	3	–1
Nationalist Party	7,482	32.53	2	+1
Momentum	276	1.20	–	–
AD+PD	260	1.13	–	–
Aħwa Maltin	174	0.76	–	–
Total	23,002	100.00	5	0
Valid votes	23,002	98.01		
Invalid/blank votes	466	1.99		
Total votes	23,468	100.00		
Registered voters/turnout	26,438	88.77		

==== District 5 ====
Party	Votes	%	Seats	+/–
Labour Party	14,570	60.94	3	–1
Nationalist Party	8,481	35.47	2	+1
AD+PD	336	1.41	–	–
Momentum	318	1.33	–	–
Aħwa Maltin	204	0.85	–	–
Total	23,909	100.00	5	0
Valid votes	23,909	97.67		
Invalid/blank votes	571	2.33		
Total votes	24,480	100.00		
Registered voters/turnout	27,353	89.50		

==== District 6 ====
Party	Votes	%	Seats	+/–
Labour Party	13,320	56.60	3	0
Nationalist Party	9,478	40.27	2	0
AD+PD	455	1.93	–	–
Aħwa Maltin	126	0.54	–	–
Momentum	100	0.42	–	–
Nazzareno Bonnici	56	0.24	–	–
Total	23,535	100.00	5	0
Valid votes	23,535	98.31		
Invalid/blank votes	404	1.69		
Total votes	23,939	100.00		
Registered voters/turnout	26,779	89.39		

==== District 7 ====
Party	Votes	%	Seats	+/–
Labour Party	12,395	53.26	3	0
Nationalist Party	10,128	43.52	2	0
AD+PD	339	1.46	–	–
Momentum	258	1.11	–	–
Aħwa Maltin	124	0.53	–	–
Noel Apap	28	0.12	–	–
Total	23,272	100.00	5	0
Valid votes	23,272	97.81		
Invalid/blank votes	520	2.19		
Total votes	23,792	100.00		
Registered voters/turnout	26,511	89.74		

==== District 8 ====
Party	Votes	%	Seats	+/–
Nationalist Party	13,022	53.89	3	0
Labour Party	10,179	42.12	2	0
AD+PD	415	1.72	–	–
Momentum	409	1.69	–	–
Aħwa Maltin	139	0.58	–	–
Total	24,164	100.00	5	0
Valid votes	24,164	98.21		
Invalid/blank votes	441	1.79		
Total votes	24,605	100.00		
Registered voters/turnout	27,882	88.25		

==== District 9 ====
Party	Votes	%	Seats	+/–
Nationalist Party	12,829	56.07	3	0
Labour Party	9,039	39.50	2	0
Momentum	722	3.16	–	–
AD+PD	157	0.69	–	–
Aħwa Maltin	73	0.32	–	–
Imperium Europa	62	0.27	–	–
Total	22,882	100.00	5	0
Valid votes	22,882	98.20		
Invalid/blank votes	419	1.80		
Total votes	23,301	100.00		
Registered voters/turnout	27,264	85.46		

==== District 10 ====
Party	Votes	%	Seats	+/–
Nationalist Party	13,633	60.85	3	0
Labour Party	7,701	34.37	2	0
Momentum	820	3.66	0	–
AD+PD	146	0.65	0	–
Aħwa Maltin	104	0.46	0	–
Total	22,404	100.00	5	0
Valid votes	22,404	98.07		
Invalid/blank votes	440	1.93		
Total votes	22,844	100.00		
Registered voters/turnout	27,658	82.59		

==== District 11 ====
Party	Votes	%	+/–	Seats	+/–
Nationalist Party	12,728	55.44	+2.10	3	0
Labour Party	9,236	40.23	–1.89	2	0
Momentum	539	2.35	New	0	0
AD+PD	330	1.44	+0.26	0	0
Aħwa Maltin	127	0.55	+0.10	0	0
Total	22,960	100.00	–	5	0
Valid votes	22,960	98.23			
Invalid/blank votes	413	1.77			
Total votes	23,373	100.00			
Registered voters/turnout	26,687	87.58			

==== District 12 ====
Party	Votes	%	+/–	Seats	+/–
Nationalist Party	11,013	52.62	+3.13	3	–1
Labour Party	8,983	42.92	–3.90	2	0
AD+PD	593	2.83	+0.42	0	0
Momentum	201	0.96	New	0	0
Aħwa Maltin	139	0.66	+0.01	0	0
Total	20,929	100.00	–	5	–1
Valid votes	20,929	97.64			
Invalid/blank votes	505	2.36			
Total votes	21,434	100.00			
Registered voters/turnout	26,334	81.39			

==== District 13 – Gozo ====
One additional proportional seat was awarded to the Nationalist Party, tying the two major parties in seat count.

Party	Votes	%	+/–	Seats	+/–
Nationalist Party	13,753	49.32	+5.38	3	+1
Labour Party	13,609	48.81	–4.73	3	0
Momentum	199	0.71	New	0	0
AD+PD	187	0.67	+0.33	0	0
Aħwa Maltin	136	0.49	+0.16	0	0
Total	27,884	100.00	–	6	+1
Valid votes	27,884	97.92			
Invalid/blank votes	593	2.08			
Total votes	28,477	100.00			
Registered voters/turnout	31,842	89.43			

== Aftermath ==
The Labour Party declared victory at approximately 11:00 am. The initial projected vote gap between the two major parties was 18,000, a reduction of over half from the 2022 general elections, however the final tally released by the Electoral Commission indicates a gap of 21,721 votes, still a decrease of 3.34% for Labour. Alex Borg conceded defeat and responded to his loss with a sense of positivity on social media, stating that his work will continue and that he will work to further reduce the gap.
