= Opinion polling for the 2026 Maltese general election =

In the run up to the 2026 Maltese general election, on 30 May 2026, various organizations have carried out opinion polling to gauge voting intention in Malta. Results of such polls are displayed in this article.

In the most recent general election, in 2022, the Labour Party won their third consecutive election, and have been in power since 2013.

== Graphical summary ==
Local regression trend line of poll results, with each line corresponding to a political party

== Party polling ==
Poll results are listed in the table below in reverse chronological order. The highest percentage figure in each poll is displayed in bold, and its background is shaded in the leading party's colour. The "lead" column shows the percentage point difference between the two parties with the highest figures. When a poll result is a tie, the figures with the highest percentages are both shaded and displayed in bold.

It is not uncommon for the third largest party, AD+PD and other smaller parties to be grouped together in polls, or totally excluded.

=== Expressing a Preference ===
The values in the table below are derived by removing non-party responses (i.e. non-voters, "don't know", and "no reply"); as the margin is also recalculated, there may be slight differences in exact lead margins due to rounding.

Dates Conducted	Polling firm	Sample size	PL	PN	AD+PD	M	Others	Lead	Not voting (Note: Excluded from calculation for the party percentages.)	Don't know (Note: Excluded from calculation for the party percentages.)	No reply (Note: Excluded from calculation for the party percentages.)
30 May 2026	2026 general election	–	**51.8**	44.7	1.3	1.5	0.7	7.1	12.6	–	–
13 – 24 May 2026	Malta Today	1,382	**50.6**	44.2	5.2			6.4	20.8	–	–
18 – 23 May 2026	Esprimi/Times of Malta	600	**53.5**	42.9	3.6			10.6	–	–	–
14 – 20 May 2026	Sagalytics	1,500	**54.3**	42.2	3.5			12.1	–	9.6	–
7 – 13 May 2026	Sagalytics	1,200	**52.9**	42.9	4.2			10.0	–	10.7	–
29 April – 13 May 2026	Malta Today	1,408	**50.1**	43.8	6.1			6.3	22.7	–	–
6 – 13 May 2026	Esprimi/Times of Malta	600	**52.9**	44.0	3.1			8.9	–	–	–
30 Apr – 6 May 2026	Sagalytics	1,200	**53.1**	42.6	2.3	2.0		10.5	–	–	–
23-29 Apr 2026	Sagalytics	1,200	**53.2**	43.1	3.7			10.1	–	12.6	–
9–16 Apr 2026	Esprimi	600	**51.3**	45.0	3.7			5.3	16.0	–	–
23 Feb – 6 Mar 2026	Malta Today	784	**48.2**	45.6	3.7	2.1	0.4	2.6	19.3	–	–
13–19 Feb 2026	Independent	1200	**52.8**	42.6	4.6			10.2	–	11.8	–
5–16 Jan 2026	Malta Today	813	**48.9**	45.7	2.3	2.3	0.8	3.2	–	–	–
13–20 Nov 2025	Sagalytics	1200	**52.3**	43.5	1.7	–	2.0	8.8	–	12.7	–
5–13 Nov 2025	MaltaToday	799	**48.7**	46.1	4.1	1.2	0.0	2.6	–	–	–
24 Sept – 2 Oct 2025	MaltaToday	741	**48.8**	45.9	2.4	2.0	1.0	2.9	18.4	–	–
28 May – 6 Jun 2025	MaltaToday	647	**53.3**	39.7	1.6	3.1	2.2	13.3	6.7	–	–
28 Mar–8 Apr 2025	MaltaToday	651	**51.6**	42.8	1.5	2.2	1.9	8.8	22.5	–	–
29 Jan–13 Feb 2025	MaltaToday	672	**48.2**	43.9	3.4	4.0	0.5	4.3	24.5	–	–
30 Jan – 12 Feb 2025	Times of Malta	600	**51.5**	45.0	3.5			6.5	19.7	–	–
5–13 Nov 2024	MaltaToday	707	45.3	**46.3**	4.1	–	4.2	1.0	29.4	–	–
11–19 Sep 2024	MaltaToday	712	43.8	**48.2**	4.5	–	3.5	4.4	24.3	–	–
8 June 2024	2024 EP Election (Note: Although it is important that EP Elections are treated differently to General Elections, this is still an important reference point.)	–	**45.3**	42.0	1.2	–	11.2	3.3	27.0	–	–
28–29 May	Senior Government Ministers, former Ministers, and civil servants are charged in court following the conclusion of the Magisterial Inquiry into the Vitals Scandal.										
28 Nov – 6 Dec 2023	MaltaToday	650	**47.3**	43.1	9.6			4.2	30.2	–	–
1–9 Nov 2023	MaltaToday	637	**49.0**	45.4	5.6			3.6	31.0	–	–
14–26 Oct 2023	Esprimi/Times of Malta	600	**50.0**	44.8	5.2			5.0	27.8	–	–
25 Sep – 4 Oct 2023	MaltaToday	657	43.8	**45.8**	10.4			2.0	31	–	–
9–16 Mar 2023	Esprimi/Times of Malta	600	**51.6**	42.9	5.5			8.7	27.4	–	–
29 Feb	Court annuls contentious 2015 transfer - approved by former PL Prime Minister Joseph Muscat - of three hospitals to international control.										
26 March 2022	2022 general election	–	**45.8**	34.7	1.3	–	1.3	11.1	14.4	–	–

=== Complete Data ===
Dates Conducted	Polling firm	Sample size	PL	PN	AD+PD	M	Others	Lead	Not voting	Don't know	No reply (Note: Excluded from calculation for the party percentages.)
30 May 2026	2026 general election	–	**51.8**	44.7	1.3	1.5	0.7	7.1	12.6	–	–
1–8 Sep 2023	Independent	1600	34.9	**35.3**	4.9	–	4.6	0.4	15.9	4.4	–
10–20 Jul 2023	MaltaToday	749	29.6	**30.2**	1.2	–	1.2	0.6	22.6	13.9	–
10–19 May 2023	MaltaToday	574	**33.1**	28.7	0.4	–	0.7	4.4	20.8	14.7	–
3–10 Mar 2023	MaltaToday	574	**30.8**	28.4	2.1	–	2.6	2.4	24.8	10.0	–
29 Feb	Court annuls contentious 2015 transfer - approved by former PL Prime Minister Joseph Muscat - of three hospitals to international control.										
24 Jan – 1 Feb 2023	MaltaToday	646	**38.7**	22.8	0.7	–	2.0	15.9	23.9	10.5	–
22 Nov – 1 Dec 2022	MaltaToday	650	**36.4**	24.2	2.3	–	0.8	12.2	22.2	13.2	–
13–30 Sep 2022	MaltaToday	647	**39.4**	19.9	3.2	–	0.9	19.5	22.5	14.9	–
6–14 Jul 2022	MaltaToday	656	**42.0**	25.8	2.0	–	0.9	16.2	14.5	14.1	–
16–25 May 2022	MaltaToday	656	**43.9**	28.8	2.8	–	0.6	15.1	11.2	11.4	–
26 March 2022	2022 general election	–	**45.8**	34.7	1.3	–	1.3	11.1	14.4	–	2.5
21 Feb – 24 Mar 2022	Malta Today	2,995	**46.5**	38.7	1.7			7.8	13.0	–	–
18 Mar – 23 Mar 2022	Vincent Marmarà	1,800	**49.2**	37.7	1.1			11.5	12.0	–	–

== Leader trust ==
Fieldwork date	Polling firm	Sample size	Abela	Borg	Grech (Note: Bernard Grech is the former leader of the party, announcing his resignation on 10 June 2025, which took effect upon the election of Alex Borg as party leader on 6 September 2025.)	Gauci	Cassola	Neither	Lead (Note: Lead over other leader or non-voters)	Don't know
14 - 20 May 2026	Sagalytics	1,500	47.8	33.3	-	2.4		7	14.5	9.5
7 - 13 May 2026	Sagalytics	1,200	46.9	32.7	-	-	-	8.6	14.2	8.9
29 Apr - 13 May 2026	Malta Today	1,408	43.5	36.4	-	-	-	-	7.1	-
30 Apr – 6 May 2026	Sagalytics	1,200	46.2	32.2	–	4		8	14.0	9.6
23-29 Apr 2026	Sagalytics	1,200	45.6	32	–	–	–	8	13.6	10.7
23 Feb – 6 Mar 2026	Malta Today	784	44.1	37.7	–	–	–	18.2	6.4	–
18–27 Oct 2025	Times of Malta	600	45.6	38.8	–	–	–	15.6	6.8	–
29 Jan – 13 Feb 2025	MaltaToday	672	46.8	–	24.7	–	–	28.5	18.3	–
7–21 Mar 2024	MaltaToday	657	45.9	–	21.7	–	–	32.4	13.5	–
26 Jan – 5 Feb 2024	MaltaToday	647	41.1	–	16.7	–	–	42.2	1.1	–
28 Nov – 6 Dec 2023	MaltaToday	650	37.5	–	21.1	–	–	41.3	3.8	–
1–9 Nov 2023	MaltaToday	637	38.0	–	23.6	–	–	38.4	0.4	–
14 – 26 Oct 2023	Esprimi/Times of Malta	600	45.7	–	36.9	–	–	–	8.8	–
25 Sep – 4 Oct 2023	MaltaToday	657	39.2	–	20	–	–	40.9	1.7	–
1–8 Sep 2023	Independent	1600	36	–	27.1	7.8	–	29.1	6.9	–
10–20 Jul 2023	MaltaToday	749	36	–	26.8	–	–	33.3	5.9	0.7

== Prediction Markets ==
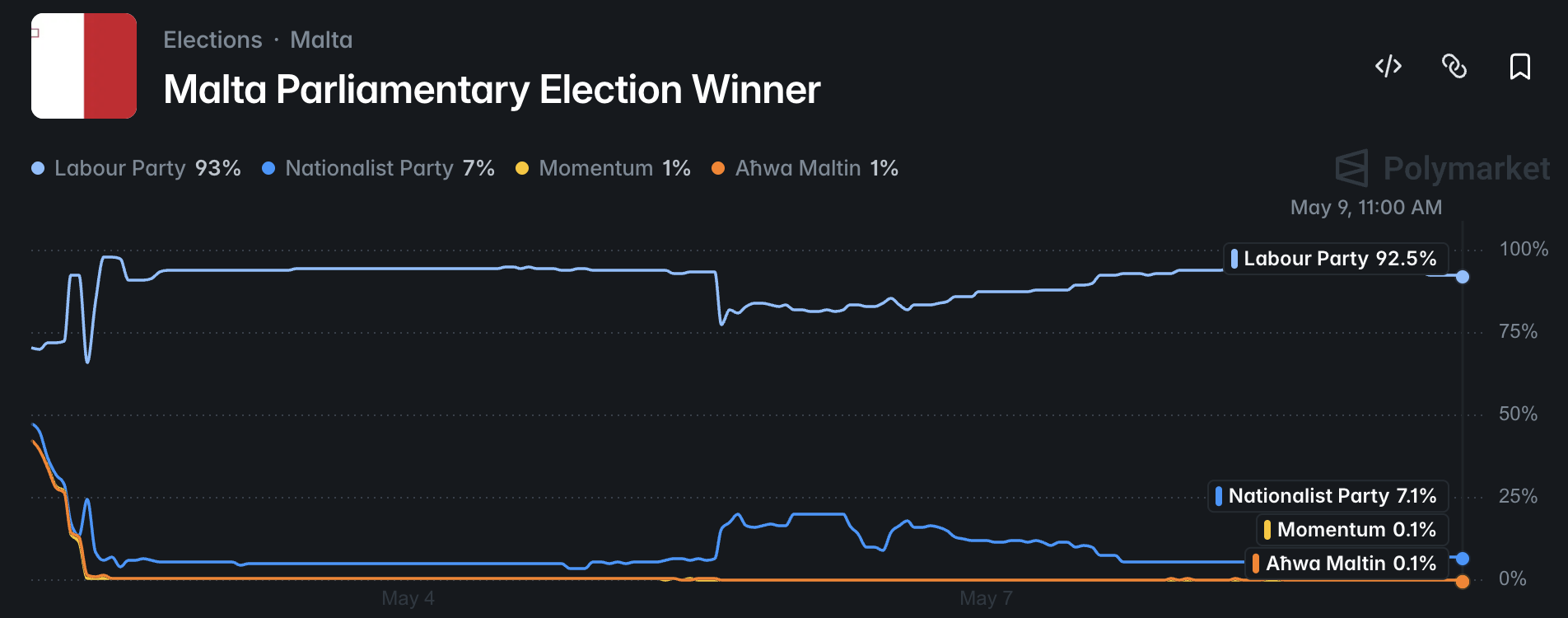
Screenshot of the Malta Parliamentary Election Winner page on Polymarket

Betting on elections in Malta is illegal, as no license can be issued to for-profit election gambling. However, significant black market betting behind closed doors is commonplace. The 2026 Maltese general election is the first one for which a legal form of betting can take place, through online prediction markets. Polymarket, a US-based prediction market platform, opened markets on the 2nd of May 2026 about which party will win the general election, the next leader of Malta, the party that will place third and the voter turnout. Predictions on these markets are crowdsourced and constantly changing.

== See also ==
- Opinion polling for the 2024 European Parliament election in Malta
