= Attard (surname) =

Attard is a Maltese surname which has origins in the neighboring island of Sicily. The name might mean Atha which means "noble" and Hardu which means "strong". Another possibility is that it comes from the village of Atti, Italy. Notable people with the surname include:

- Cain Attard (born 1994), Maltese footballer
- Charlene Attard (born 1987), Maltese track and field sprint athlete
- Emilio Attard Alonso (died 1997), Spanish lawyer and politician
- Giovanni Attard (c. 1570–1636), Maltese architect and military engineer
- Graziella Attard Previ, Maltese politician
- Jayden Attard (born 1986), Australian rules footballer
- Karen Attard (born 1958), Australian writer of fantasy and short fiction
- Larry Attard (born 1951), Canadian Hall of Fame Champion jockey and horse trainer
- Laura Attard (born 1986), Australian rules footballer
- Monica Attard (born 1958), Australian journalist
- Norbert Francis Attard (born 1951), Maltese multi-disciplinary artist
- Ramona Attard, Maltese politician
- Ronnie Attard (born 1999), American ice hockey player
- Sid C. Attard (born 1950), Canadian horse racing trainer
- Joseph Attard (born 1965), former football referee
- Wilfred Attard (died 2001), Maltese chess master
