= Iván Castillo =

Iván Castillo may refer to:

- Iván Castillo (footballer) (born 1970), Bolivian football player
- Iván Castillo (baseball) (born 1995), Dominican professional baseball infielder
- Ivan Castillo (politician), Maltese member of parliament
