= Naomi Cachia =

Maltese politician

MP for District 7
- Incumbent
- Assumed office 2022

Government Whip
- Incumbent
- Assumed office 2024
- Deputy: Davina Sammut Hili (2022-2026); Fleur Abela (Since 2026)
- Preceded by: Andy Ellul

Personal details
- Party: Labour Party

Naomi Cachia (born 1993 or 1994) is a Maltese politician from the Labour Party. She was first elected to the Parliament of Malta in the 2022 Maltese general election under the gender quota, representing District 7.

== Career ==
Cachia is a lawyer by profession. In her political career, she has been known for her progressive stances, particularly in regard to women and women's representation in government and society.

In 2017, she was elected president of Forum Zghazagh Laburisti (FZL).

In 2021, Cachia announced she would contest the election for District 7. Cachia was elected to the Parliament of Malta in the 2022 Maltese general election under the gender quota, representing Malta's 7th District. In Parliament, she serves on the Foreign and European Affairs Committee and the House Business Committee.

In April 2022, Cachia was appointed assistant whip. In January 2024, she was appointed Labour Parliamentary Whip, the first woman to serve in that role. She succeeded Andy Ellul.

Cachia is head of the Maltese delegation to the Parliamentary Assembly of the Council of Europe.

== See also ==
- List of members of the parliament of Malta, 2022–2027
