= Romilda (given name) =

Romilda is a feminine given name which may refer to:

- Romilda of Friuli (died 611), Italian duchess
- Romilda Baldacchino Zarb, Maltese politician
- Romilda Pantaleoni (1847–1917), Italian opera singer
- Romilda Vane, fictional character from Harry Potter

== See also ==
- Romilar
