= Albert Buttigieg =

Maltese politician

Honourable Albert Buttigieg MP
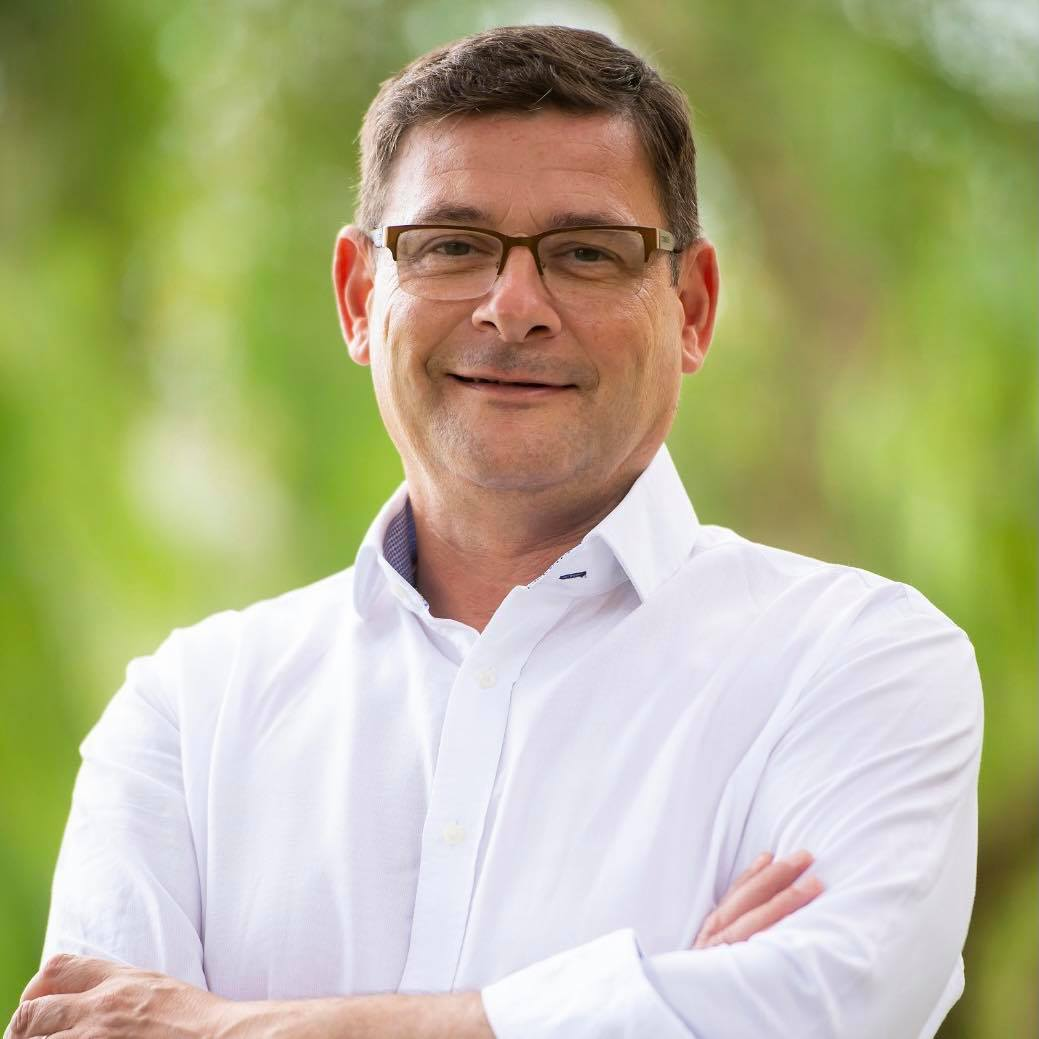

Former Member of the Parliament of Malta for District 10

Personal details
- Born: 24 August 1964 (age 61)
- Party: Nationalist Party
- Spouse: Benna Chase

Albert Buttigieg is a former Maltese politician from the Nationalist Party. In 2022, he was elected to the Parliament of Malta in District 10 in a by-election succeeding Robert Arrigo who had died. He was the Shadow Minister for the Family and Social Security.

He was formerly the Mayor of St. Julian's.

== Education and early career ==
After completing compulsory education, Albert Buttigieg obtained degrees in Philosophy (1985-1983) and Theology (1985-1987). He later obtained a Diploma in Pastoral Care and became a Roman Catholic priest in 1989. During this time he used to teach at De La Salle College and was a Director of a Youth Centre in Kalkara.

During 1995-2002 he was vice parish priest for the town of San Gwann. He was also responsible for the initiatives for senior citizens and disabled persons within the same locality. As an appreciation for the services rendered, in June 2001, the San Gwann local council awarded him ‘Mertu San Gwann', which is an award of merit.

Albert Buttigieg left the priesthood in 2001, but continued to work and serve within the local community. During 2001-2004, he was a Lecturer at the University of Malta lecturing at the Faculty of Education and Faculty of Theology. Between 2005 and 2007, he also lectured at MCAST.

== Deputy Mayor and Mayor of St. Julians ==
Albert Buttigieg served as the Deputy Mayor of St. Julians during 2014-2019. He was later elected and appointed as Mayor within the same town. He served as the Mayor of St. Julians from 2019 till 2023.

== Political career ==
In 2022, Albert Buttigieg was elected in a by-election as a Member of Parliament for District 10 with the Nationalist Party.

In January 2024, former opposition leader Bernard Grech appointed Buttigieg as the Shadow Minister for the Family and Social Security.

After the 2026 Maltese general election, Buttigieg announced that his political journey has come to an end, stating that he is leaving politics with his integrity intact; a Maltese expression used to signify honesty and integrity.

== See also ==
- List of members of the parliament of Malta, 2022–2027
