= Beppe Galea =

Maltese politician

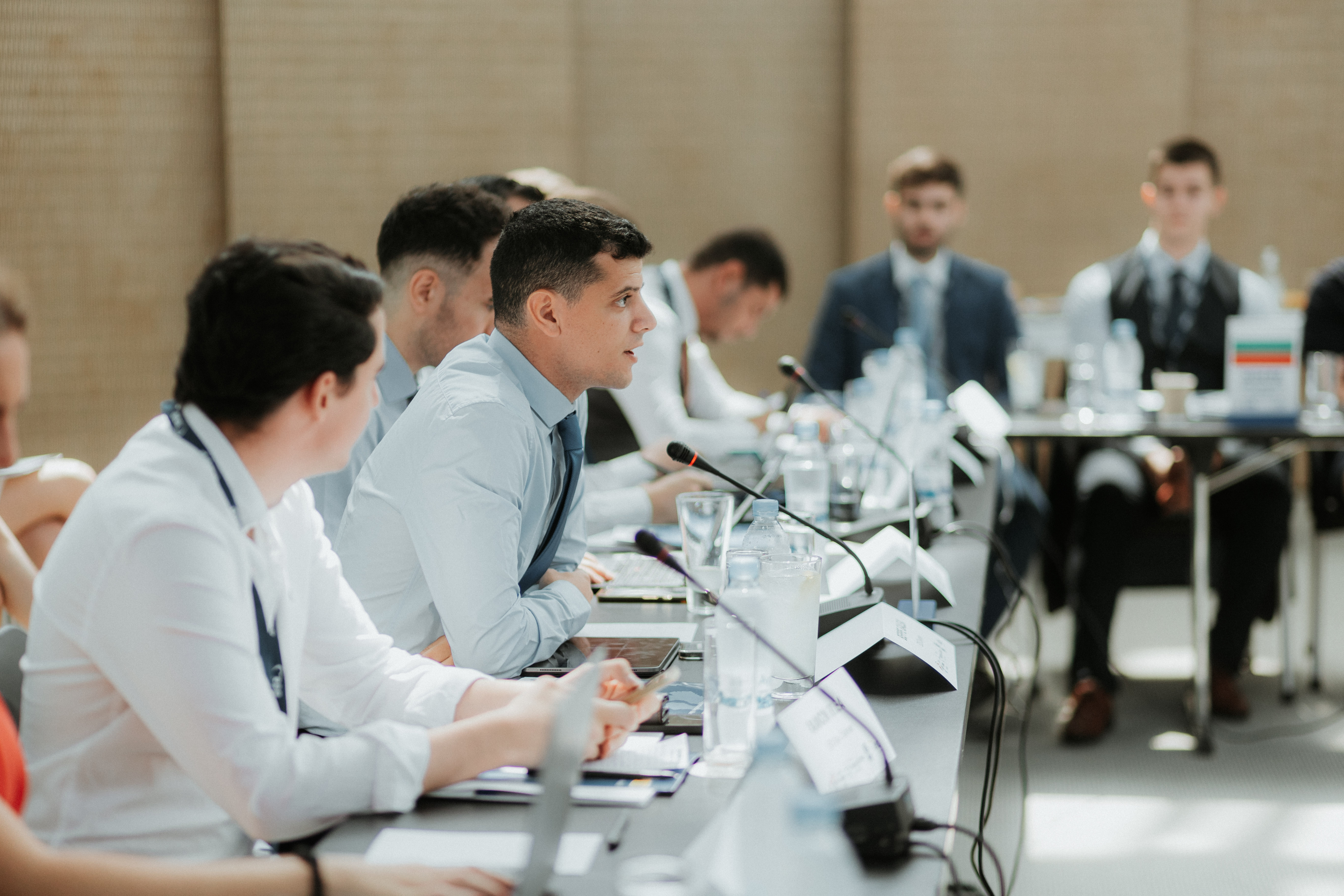

Member of the Maltese Parliament for Thirteenth District, Gozo
- Incumbent
- Assumed office 20 June 2026

Personal details
- Born: 15 June 1996 (age 30) Gozo, Malta
- Party: Nationalist Party
- Education: University of Malta
- Occupation: Member of Parliament

Beppe Galea is a Maltese politician from Gozo. During the 2026 general election he was elected to the Maltese House of Representatives to serve in its fifteenth legislature. He took the oath of allegiance on 20 June 2026 and now serves as Shadow Minister for the Voluntary Sector for the Nationalist Party and is a member of the Gozo Affairs Committee.

He is also International Secretary of the Nationalist Party. Before that he spent several years in student and European politics, leading the EPP student associations, European Democrat Students, from 2021 to 2024.

== Early life and education ==
Galea was born and raised on the island of Gozo. He attended the University of Malta, first graduating from a degree in European Studies and later in a master’s in Strategic Management and Digital Marketing.

Galea started out in journalism, working at Newsbook Malta, one of the most visitar online news portal in Malta. For a while he also looked after digital communications for the Nationalist Party.

== Political career ==
=== Youth politics ===
Galea joined the Nationalist Party student wing Studenti Demokristjani Maltin (SDM) back in 2012. He very soon became Gozo Coordinator at first and later served International Officer between 2015 and 2017. At the end of his student activism time he also became Deputy Secretary General of the National Youth Council of Malta.

After his first years attending European Democrat Students events he became Vice-Chairman of the organisation during the 2017 Summer University hosted in Varna, Bulgaria. Two years later, during the 2019 Summer University hosted in Bucharest, he was appointed Secretary General. He was only the second Maltese person to hold that post, after Roberta Metsola.

At the end of his tenure as Secretary General, the EDS Council decided to promote him and on 17 July 2021 he became the first Maltese Chairman of EDS. He stayed on the job until 3 August 2024 when he was succeeded by the Italian Francesco Sismondini from the student organization Studicentro.

=== National politics ===
After his success in the EPP student branch, the Nationalist Party appointed Galea as its International Secretary in July 2023. He continues to be the party International Secretary after being confirmed in January 2026 amid a change of leadership

In December 2024 the party put him forward as a candidate for the 13th District in Gozo for the 2026 General Election, when he eventually was elected to his first term in Parliament.
