= Momentum (political party) =

Momentum Partit Momentum
- Governing body: Executive Committee
- Chairperson: Arnold Cassola
- General Secretary: Mark Camilleri Gambin
- Founders: Arnold Cassola; Mark Camilleri Gambin
- Founded: 17 January 2025
- Ideology: Environmentalism; Anti-corruption
- Political position: Centre to centre-left
- European affiliation: European Democratic Party
- Colours: Turquoise
- Parliament of Malta: 0 / 67
- European Parliament: 0 / 6
- Local Council Seats: 0 / 462

Election symbol

Website
- partitmomentum.org

Momentum (Maltese: Partit Momentum) is a centrist to centre-left political party in Malta. It was founded by Arnold Cassola and Mark Camilleri Gambin and officially launched in 2025.

== History ==
Arnold Cassola previously led the Democratic Alternative party from 2008–2009 and then again from 2013–2017 before resigning from the party in 2019. Cassola's resignation was reportedly due to clashes with party leadership and disagreements over the views of abortion of another Green candidate.

Cassola later contested the 2019, 2022 and 2024 elections as an independent candidate. He achieved his best result as an independent candidate in the 2024 European Parliament election, when he attained the third-highest number of first preference votes.

Following the election, Cassola called for a "centre-green-left" coalition to be established. Cassola later established "vision circles" as policy discussion forums.

Momentum joined the European Democratic Party in May 2025.

In March 2026, ADPD leader Sandra Gauci announced that the party was in talks with Momentum to join forces for the upcoming general election.

== Ideology ==
Momentum's main focus is on good governance, economic justice and environmentalism. The party allows for a free vote on ethical issues, particularly the issue of abortion.

== Executive Committee ==
Momentum's first executive committee was announced with the formation of the party.

- Chairperson – Arnold Cassola
- General Secretary – Mark Camilleri Gambin
- Treasurer – Carmel Asciak
- Committee Members – Graziella Spiteri, Katya Compagno, Natasha Azzopardi, Dr Matthew Agius

== Election results ==
In the 2026 General Election, Momentum contested with 7 candidates across all 13 districts. They received 4,700 first count votes across Malta, however they did not win a seat in parliament as they failed to meet the district quota. The candidates who ran for parliament under Partit Momentum included Prof. Arnold Cassola, Mark Camilleri Gambin, Dr. Matthew Agius, Prof. Pierre Schembri Wismayer, Billy McBee, Dr. Alastair Farrugia and Carmel Asciak.

=== House of Representatives ===
Election	Leader	Votes	%	Seats	+/−	Rank	Status
2026	Arnold Cassola	4,700	1.54	0 / 67	New	3rd	Extra-parliamentary
