= Eve Borg Bonello =

Maltese activist and politician

Honourable Eve Borg Bonello MP
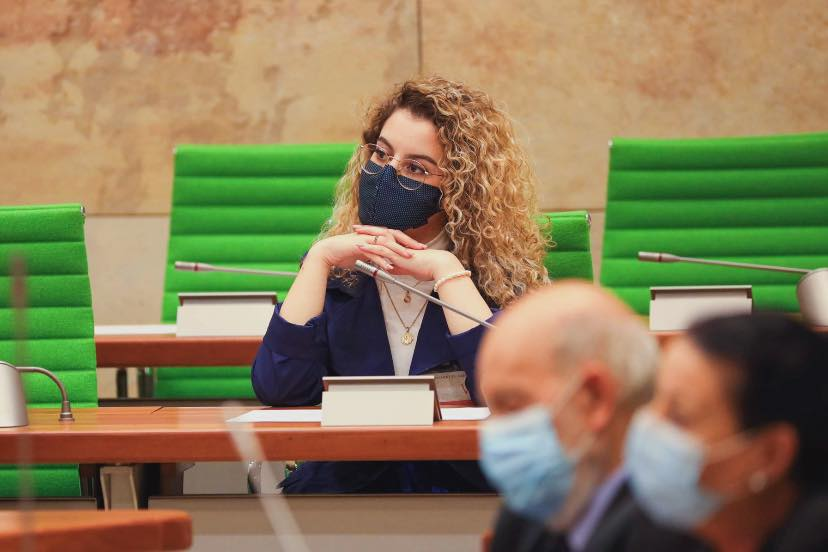

Member of Parliament
- Incumbent
- Assumed office 7 May 2022

Shadow Minister for Climate Change & Public Cleanliness
- Incumbent
- Assumed office 10 September 2025

Personal details
- Born: 9 May 2003 (age 23)
- Party: Nationalist Party
- Education: University of Malta
- Website: https://eveborgbonello.com/

Eve Borg Bonello MP (born 9 May 2003) is a Maltese activist and politician who grew to prominence during the 2019-2020 Maltese protests for her vocal opposition to former Prime Minister Joseph Muscat and the corruption scandals that triggered the 2019 Malta political crisis and Muscat's eventual resignation.

In April 2022, Borg Bonello was elected as a Member of Parliament in the 2022 Maltese General Election, becoming the youngest member ever elected to the Maltese House of Representatives in the country's constitutional history. She is the world's youngest sitting member in a national legislature.

== Political life ==
Eve Borg Bonello entered political life as an activist promoting good governance, the rule of law, and democracy.

She first spoke publicly when reciting her poem at a vigil to assassinated journalist Daphne Caruana Galizia.

The 2019-2020 protests were a watershed moment for Borg Bonello, after delivering an impassioned speech that garnered 160,000 views, around half the voting population of Malta (c.340,000 as of 2017). She accused then Prime Minister Joseph Muscat of stealing her future, a line attributed to climate activist Greta Thunberg.

The speech attracted praise and derision in equal measure, as well as several death threats from supporters of the ruling Partit Laburista. The volume and ferocity of the comments only attracted more attention to the speech and amplified its message.

The death threats led to several prosecutions, including a €1,500 fine for a woman who commented on Facebook, "As long as I'm alive, I won't leave you in peace, not even in your grave as I'll shake it everyday. I hate you and everyone around you so much".

Borg Bonello accepted the accused's apologies in court and chose to drop the charges.

== Electoral record ==
Eve Borg Bonello ran on the 9th and 10th districts during the 2022 Maltese General Election. She obtained 389 and 381 first preference votes respectively, beating some incumbent and high-ranking politicians in her own party. Ultimately, she was elected through the gender quota mechanism with 1314 final count votes she obtained on the 9th district. It was made possible after Rebekah Cilia was elected on the 7th district, bumping Eve Borg Bonello into the Nationalist Party's gender quota list.

== Activism ==
Borg Bonello participated and organized protests as an activist within civil society. In 2019, she mobilized a crowd of students to commemorate the assassination of Daphne Caruana Galizia.

In 2020, she participated in the "Fibonacci Protests". For 3 weeks, Borg Bonello and other students protested outside Parliament during sitting days to pressure MPs into disembarking a group of 450 migrants who were detained offshore in the beginning of the Coronavirus pandemic.

The protests were successful, but similarly attracted derision and death threats. A man was prosecuted for publicly calling for "A baseball bat to the head of the three boys and gang rape from the black people on Captain Morgan for the five girls...win win situation for everyone".

Despite the threats, Eve Borg Bonello said in an interview with Lovin Malta that she intended on continuing speaking out.

Eve Borg Bonello endorsed an environmental protest, calling for more government action to combat climate change.

=== Partit Nazzjonalista ===
In 2020, Eve Borg Bonello signed up as a member of Partit Nazzjonalista. She was promptly elected President of Team Start PN, the youth wing catered to 14-18 year olds. As President, she has a vote on the executive committee and the General Council of Partit Nazzjonalista.

In 2022, in anticipation of the general elections, Eve Borg Bonello was approved as the youngest candidate in the country's history for the Maltese House of Representatives. According to Tim Diacono of Lovin Malta, she would be the youngest elected representative in Europe.

==== Team Start ====
As President of Team Start, Borg Bonello led a number of high-profile actions to protest the Maltese Government's inaction against corruption and institutional abuse. In August 2021, she led a group of youth in sunbeds to protest the postponement of a vote of no confidence until after the recess of the House of Representatives.

In October 2021, Team Start dressed as mobsters and delivered an oversize charity cheque of €200,000 to the Labour Party headquarters to draw attention to the donation given to the Labour Party by Yorgen Fenech, the magnate accused of ordering Daphne Caruana Galizia's assassination.

Later that month, Team Start staged an action outside the national broadcaster after research revealed a strong pro-government bias, with almost all airtime being given to the incumbent Labour Party.

In February 2022, Team Start set up a mock pop-up office to decry Prime Minister Robert Abela's extortionate government direct orders against rising inflation.

== Political views ==
=== On politics ===
In an interview with Lovin Malta's Sam Vassallo, Borg Bonello said "The problem lies with how we look at politics in Malta. It's seen as a disgusting, difficult, boring, tedious, self-serving vehicle that doesn't propel change. It's not true at all.

"Politics is fun. It drives change and changes the world. You have to enjoy being in it and understand your power. That's what we tell our members at Team Start – make sure you enjoy being here. That's how we get young people to join us".

=== On feminism and the gender quota mechanism ===
"We live in a sexist, misogynist Mediterranean culture, so we need something radical to propel women forward and support them to represent half the country. My only issue is that if it drags into the long term. Then, we would’ve messed up. There are reasons why women won't get into politics and we need to address that – it's not just widespread sexism but sexist structures".

On the gender quota mechanism, Borg Bonello wrote in an op-ed for the Times of Malta, "But what we really need is a culture that attracts women to politics. We need a more accessible legislature with family-friendly measures. We need a change in mentality to combat misogyny and hate speech towards women activists. We need to forget about machoism. On this front, the quota system doesn’t deliver. And we need to get it out of our heads that women need quotas to get elected."

=== On Partit Nazzjonalista ===
"The PN is a mosaic of different ideas, beliefs, backgrounds. I am just part of that mosaic fighting for a better Malta and for justice".

=== On religion ===
"I was raised Catholic, my parents are quite religious and I went to a church school for primary, secondary and sixth form. When I was younger, I found myself rebelling against religion, just out of the rebel-without-a-cause phase [where I was] rebelling against any form of authority.

"The first people to give us support, and much more importantly to speak up for these very vulnerable people, were the Church and the Jesuits. That was a turning point to me because while yes, the Church is a fallible institution made out of people, there are also good people who practice what they preach".

=== On Catholic mass ===
"It's almost a moral check on myself to make sure I stay on the right route and a pocket of peace where I get to reflect. Some people do it through other ways but I feel very comfortable doing it by going to Mass and I feel it helps me reflect, look at the entire situation, and try and stay on the right route."

== Controversies ==
=== Junior Minister Rosianne Cutajar ===
In February 2021, Eve Borg Bonello criticised junior minister Rosianne Cutajar after failing to resign after evidence of large cash deals emerged with Yorgen Fenech, the business magnate charged with successfully plotting to assassinate journalist Daphne Caruana Galizia. Cutajar took offense at Borg Bonello's choice of photo, which shows Cutajar striking a pose 12 years earlier, as a university student.

Cutajar accused Borg Bonello of having "so much spite and hatred at such a tender age... I'm honestly sad for you".

Reacting to Cutajar's post, Borg Bonello rebutted that "my words didn't express hatred or spite, although it's undoubtedly a tactic to interpret all criticism as such. May I remind you what happened the last time the Labour Party went after a writer for years in such a manner and worse".

Cutajar was forced to resign her ministerial post after the Standards Commissioner found she breached the code of ethics.

Cutajar had already engaged in spats with Borg Bonello on the social media space Tik-Tok.

=== Clean-up photo ===
In 2021, Borg Bonello posted a satirical photo showing herself in a clean-up initiative at Fort Chambray, Gozo, organised by Team Start captioned "walking back from Kastilja [Office of the Prime Minister]". The barb was met with comments calling her "elitist human trash", hoping she would be "blown to pieces", alluding to the fate of slain journalist Daphne Caruana Galizia. Labour MEP Alex Agius Saliba accused her of "spiteful politics".

Multiple people were charged with hate speech, but Borg Bonello dropped the charges after accepting their apologies. Reacting to the charges, Borg Bonello said, "It seems satire is only allowed when it comes from the Labour party".

In the 2022 General Election campaign, Alex Agius Saliba is featured smiling side-by-side with Borg Bonello in a selfie.

== Personal life ==
Eve Borg Bonello was born in St Julian's. She attended St Monica School Gzira, where she was head girl, and St Aloysius College, Balzan, where she was Secretary of the Student Council. She enrolled in the law course at the University of Malta in 2020. She was the 2021 Fellow of the prestigious Benjamin Franklin Transatlantic Fellowship Summer Institute at Purdue University.
