= Rebekah Borg =

Maltese politician (born 1987)

The Honourable Rebekah Borg MP
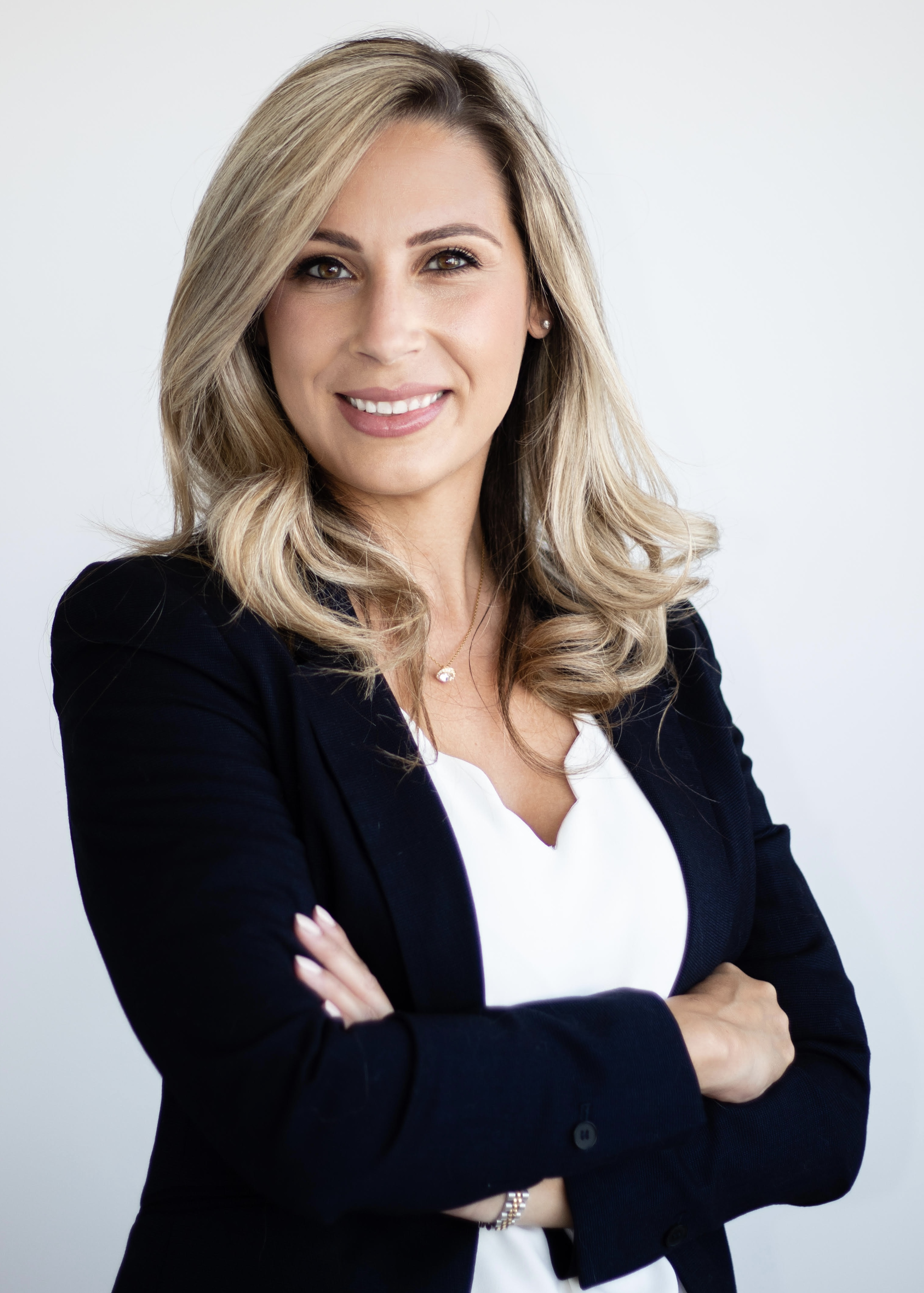

Rebekah Borg (born 25 September 1987) is a Maltese Politician, Lawyer and Engineer, currently serving as the Shadow Minister for Planning. She previously served as the Shadow Minister for the Environment and as the Shadow Minister for Lands and Consumer Rights. At the 2026 general election she was elected on both the 7th and 11th districts.

== Education ==
Borg attained a degree in electrical and electronics engineering from the University of Sheffield. She then pursued a Master of Science (MSc) in biomedical engineering at the University of Oxford, where she was awarded the Medtronic Scholarship for demonstrating exceptional talent and promise in the field of biomedical engineering.

After returning to Malta, Borg worked as a biomedical engineer, while also studying for a postgraduate diploma in building services engineering from Brunel University London. Subsequently, she obtained a diploma in journalism, graduated with a Bachelor of Laws degree, followed by a Master’s degree in advocacy from the University of Malta.

== Career ==
Borg began her career in the public sector as a biomedical engineer, specialising in medical equipment and public healthcare procurement and project management. She went on to work as the technical director of a local firm dealing in HVAC projects and equipment. Rebekah Borg also worked part-time for a local newspaper as a journalist. Rebekah Borg now works as a lawyer and engineer, combing her technical expertise with legal knowledge, in the fields of planning, environment, construction, property and technology.

== Politics ==
During her time in politics she has been active on issues related to public spaces, planning policy and environmental protection. She has argued that planning and environmental considerations should be treated as interconnected rather than competing.

Rebekah Borg’s introduction to politics came during her work as a journalist, where she interviewed several politicians and investigated a number of breaking stories.

In December 2020 she was approved as a general election candidate for the Nationalist Party on the 7th and 11th districts.

Borg contested the 2022 Maltese general election for the first time, obtaining 2078 votes from the 7th district and 1756 votes from the 11th district. Rebekah Borg was elected to parliament through a casual election after Adrian Delia vacated his seat on the 7th district.

At the 2026 Maltese general election, held on 30 May 2026, Borg contested the 7th and 11th districts for the Nationalist Party and was elected in both, obtaining a combined 4,057 first-count votes. She thereby became the fifth woman to be elected from two electoral districts in a Maltese general election. In line with the party's statute she retained her seat on the 11th district and relinquished the 7th, which was filled through a casual election.

=== Shadow Minister for Lands and Consumer Rights (2022-2024) ===
Borg has consistently advocated for public land to be accessible to everyone and to make the best possible use of the little public land Malta has. She made efforts during the Blue Lagoon deckchair and encroachment saga incidents, and in cases where the government was obscuring information about agreements with deckchair and sunbed operators in Comino.

In April 2023, Borg launched a parliamentary petition addressing the closure of Mtarfa’s government-owned primary school, urging the government to swiftly reinstate a primary school in Mtarfa by considering all possible solutions. Borg was particularly outspoken about the American University of Malta (AUM) land issue, calling for an investigation into the government's agreement for the AUM development, especially about the way information was witheld from the public as to how the university got its accreditation.

In her role as shadow minister for consumer rights, she took a stance against the alleged mileage tampering scandal, insisting on adequate compensation for affected motorists. She also prompted the Malta Competition and Consumer Affairs Authority (MCCAA) to investigate a car hire company for potential breaches of consumer protection rights related to the use of GPS tracking devices in vehicles.

She supported calls for accountability following the construction site tragedy and supported the Jean Paul Sofia public inquiry, raising questions about technical issues and fragmented responsibilities on construction sites, along with concerns over transparency within the Lands Authority.

Borg’s use of parliamentary questions was highlighted by an incident involving Tourism Minister Clayton Bartolo, who was caught on an open microphone saying he “can’t stand” Borg after she posed a supplementary question. Borg questioned the appropriateness of such language from a government minister and, while she “accepted and appreciated” his subsequent email apology, expressed her hope that such comments would not be directed at any Member of Parliament in future.

=== Shadow Minister for the Environment (2024-2026) ===
In January 2024, PN leader Bernard Grech reshuffled his shadow cabinet and appointed Borg as Shadow Minister for the Environment, a role she retained following the September 2025 PN leadership transition when Alex Borg became party leader.

Borg has argued that the environment must be placed at the heart of Malta’s economic model rather than treated as a separate concern. She has called for the entire Cabinet, not just the Environment Minister, to be committed to environmental goals.

She has accused the government of greenwashing through its Project Green initiative, which she described as “more propaganda than work on the ground,” a view she said was supported by National Audit Office findings. She was also an advocate for a PN private members bill, authored by shadow minister Darren Carabott, to enshrine the right to a healthy environment as a fundamental right in Malta’s Constitution. During the parliamentary debate she declared that Malta was facing an environmental crisis and that the environment “is not a luxury; it is everyone’s right.” Labour MPs voted the motion down.

She has been one of the opposition voices on Malta’s breach of its EU obligation in the waste water crisis. During a press conference, Borg cited the 2024 European Court of Justice ruling finding Malta in breach of EU wastewater treatment laws, and accused the government of removing the protected status of a marine zone following sewage treatment failures at the Ta’ Barkat and Ċumnija plants. She also criticised the Environment Minister for deflecting blame onto citizens rather than addressing sewage infrastructure failures, listing multiple bays closed due to E. coli. S

Borg has also expressed strong support for Malta’s transition to renewable energy. She has advocated for offshore wind farms, describing the sea as a natural opportunity for a small island state, and has criticised the government for dragging its feet on the subject. She has also called for solar rights legislation to protect homeowners from overshadowing by nearby buildings. Borg has also questioned why government buildings are not more energy efficient and why their rooftops are not being used for solar generation, arguing that government must lead by example.

In 2025, Borg tabled a parliamentary motion proposing essential amendments to the Environmental Permits Regulations. She called for shorter clearance timeframes, greater regulatory clarity, a right of appeal for both applicants and third parties challenging clearance decisions, and adequate time for public participation, amongst other things. She emphasised that activities with significant potential impacts on both the environment and residents' quality of life must be subject to serious and rigorous regulation.

In the summer of 2025, Borg worked tirelessly to ensure that the Government’s proposed planning reform would be withdrawn and revised to ensure a holistic planning overhaul. She warned that the Government’s reforms would erode public confidence in the planning system.

Borg has also advocated for a comprehensive legal overhaul in the construction industry, to ensure that responsibility on the ground is identified, favouring a holistic approach over piecemeal amendments to ensure a more cohesive legal framework.

On coastal issues, Borg’s advocacy for Comino has run across both her Lands and Environment portfolios. She demanded publication of the island’s carrying capacity study, required under the Natura 2000 management plan but never released, insisting decisions affecting Comino must be grounded in scientific evidence rather than political or commercial pressures.

She was also one of the first politicians to support a petition calling for Manoel Island to be converted into a national park, and she kept insisting that national parks be given a legal definition. She stated that even though the issue was complex, 'but it is precisely for this reason that the government must get involved and act in the public interest, not shut the door to conversation before it even begins.'

== Personal life ==
Borg married her husband Jurgen on 17 September 2022. The couple welcomed the birth of their first child, a daughter named Elizabeth, on 18 July 2023. Their second child, a son named Marcus, was born on 6 August 2025.
