= Janice Chetcuti =

Maltese politician

Janice Chetcuti is a Maltese politician from the Nationalist Party. She was elected to the Parliament of Malta in the 2022 Maltese general election under the gender quota.

== See also ==
- List of members of the parliament of Malta, 2022–2027
