= Abigail Camilleri =

Maltese politician

Abigail Camilleri is a Maltese politician from the Labour Party. She was elected to the Parliament of Malta in the 2022 Maltese general election under the gender quota.

== See also ==
- List of members of the parliament of Malta, 2022–2027
