= Ian Vassallo Hagi =

Maltese politician

Honourable Ian Vassallo Hagi MP

Member of Parliament
- Incumbent
- Assumed office 7 May 2022

Personal details
- Born: 12 July 1992 (age 34)
- Party: Nationalist Party
- Education: University of Malta
- Website: https://ianvassallohagi.com/

Ian Vassallo Hagi MP (born 12 July 1992) is a Maltese politician from the Nationalist Party. He was elected to the Parliament of Malta in the 2022 Maltese general election as an additional member to compensate for party disproportionality.

He was a councillor in Rabat since 2019 and is a podiatrist by profession.

In January 2024, Vassallo Hagi was appointed Shadow Minister for Primary Care and Mental Health.

== See also ==
- List of members of the parliament of Malta, 2022–2027
