= Carmel Cacopardo =

Maltese politician

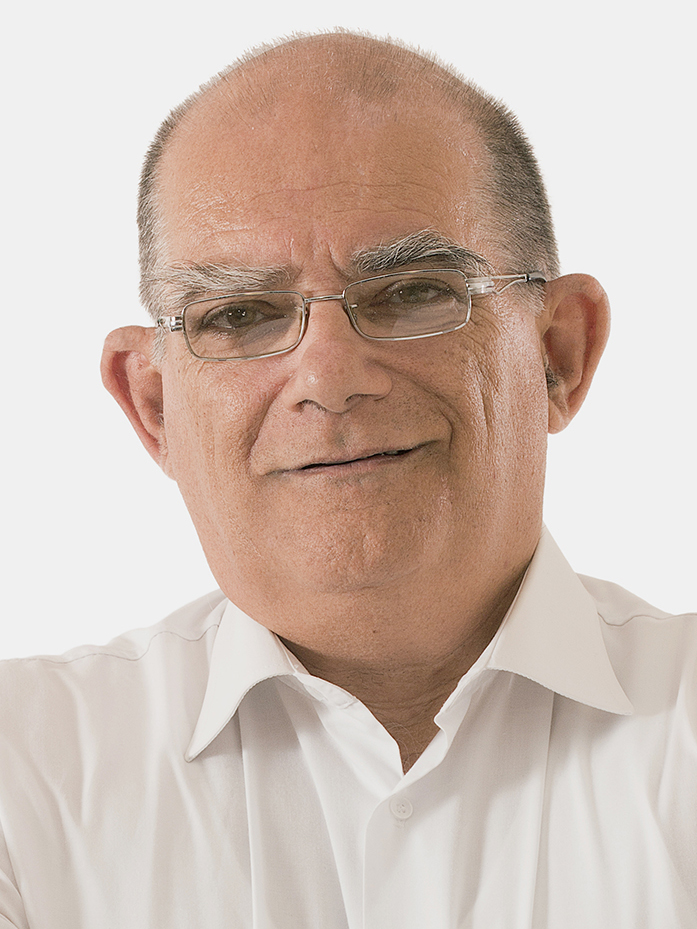

Deputy Chairperson of AD+PD
- Incumbent
- Assumed office 28 May, 2023 Serving with Mina Tolu
- Leader: Sandra Gauci

Chairperson of AD+PD
- In office 17 October, 2020 – 28 May, 2023
- Preceded by: Role established
- Succeeded by: Sandra Gauci

Chairperson of Democratic Alternative
- In office 2017–2020
- Preceded by: Arnold Cassola

Personal details
- Born: 5 March, 1956 Malta
- Party: AD+PD (2020-present)
- Other political affiliations: Democratic Alternative (2008-2020); Nationalist Party (before 2008)
- Spouse: Miriam (m.1993)
- Children: Martina (b.1994), Dario (b.1996)
- Education: University of Malta, Staffordshire University
- Occupation: Politician, Architect & Civil Engineer, Environmental Activist

Carmel Cacopardo (born 5 March, 1956) is a Maltese architect, civil engineer and politician who currently serves as deputy chairperson of the AD+PD party. Cacopardo previously served as chairperson of the Democratic Alternative party and served as chairperson of AD+PD until 2023.

== Biography ==
Carmel Cacopardo was born on 5 March 1956. He's married to Miriam and the couple have two children, Martina and Dario. He lives in Kalkara, Malta. Cacopardo graduated from the University of Malta in Architecture and Civil Engineering in 1982 and in the University of Staffordshire in the United Kingdom in 2006 in the Sustainability and Environmental Management.

In 2006 Cacopardo published a book called Time For Radical Change, based on the research on the introduction of eco-contribution in Malta. He was a student at the University of Malta President of SDM (Maltese Democrat Students) and KSU President (of the University Students' Council).

On an international level, Cacopardo was the Vice chairman of EDS (European Democrat Students).

=== Politics ===
Cacopardo was a member of the Nationalist Party. He contested in the general elections of 1987, 1992, 1996 under the PN ticket. For 12 years he was a member of the PN Executive Committee. He also occupied the posts of Information Secretary, Assistant Secretary-General and an Executive President of the Council of the PN. He was also a Secretary of MŻPN (The Youth Movement of PN).

Cacopardo left the Nationalist Party in January 2008. He later joined Democratic Alternative.

In September 2017, Cacopardo became the leader of Democratic Alternative.

Following the merger of Alternattiva Demokratika and Partit Demokratiku into AD+PD in October 2020, Cacopardo became chairman of the new party.

In May 2023, Cacopardo stepped down as Chairperson and became co-Deputy Chairperson, serving alongside Mina Tolu. He was succeeded as Chairperson by Sandra Gauci.

== Books ==
- Time for Radical Change, 2006
