= Deborah Schembri =

Maltese politician and attorney (born 1976/77)

Deborah Schembri (born 1976 or 1977) is a Maltese politician and attorney who was a member of the Parliament of Malta from 2013 to 2017. She is known for leading the pro-divorce movement during the 2011 Maltese divorce referendum.

== 2011 pro-divorce campaign ==
Malta held a referendum in May 2011 to decide the legality of divorce. Schembri, a 35-year-old family lawyer and single mother, chaired the pro-divorce campaign. Because of her advocacy, the Catholic Church in Malta barred her from practicing law in ecclesiastical court, resulting in a 40 percent loss in her income. Schembri participated in several televised debates with Anna Vella, the chair of the anti-divorce campaign. She declared victory on 29 May after initial results showed a majority of voters supporting legalizing divorce, and urged the ruling Nationalist Party to immediately pass the corresponding legislation. The bill was passed by the legislature and signed into law in July that year.

== Member of Parliament ==
Schembri was elected to the Parliament of Malta in March 2013 as a member of the Labour Party, and also became a member of the Maltese delegation in the Parliamentary Assembly of the Council of Europe. She authored a PACE report detailing discrimination against transgender people in Europe after meeting with officials and transgender rights advocates in several countries, including England, Scotland, Spain, and Turkey. In the assembly, Schembri was an advocate for accessible and affordable gender reassignment procedures, including hormone treatment and surgery.

In November 2013, she announced her candidacy for the 2014 European Parliament election in Malta. She was endorsed by prime minister Joseph Muscat, who had asked her to run. Schembri ran on a platform focused primarily on job creation and civil rights. She was not successful in the November 2014 election, receiving 5,983 votes and finishing eighth among the Labour candidates.

Schembri was appointed as parliamentary secretary for planning and simplification in January 2016 after Michael Falzon resigned. She oversaw a series of major reforms of Malta's Lands Department after the corruption scandal that led to Falzon's resignation, including appointing an audit officer to supervise public land transactions over €100,000. She also introduced an amnesty bill for buildings with planning illegalities and increased fines on fish farm operators whose feeding practices resulted in pollution of the Maltese coast. Schembri lost a close race for re-election in 2017, and was succeeded by Clayton Bartolo.

== Other activities ==
After leaving office, Schembri became a legal consultant for the Maltese Planning Authority and Lands Authority. She is also the chair of the board of appeals for the government fostering agency.
