= Annabelle Cilia =

Maltese politician

Member of the Parliament of Malta
- Incumbent
- Assumed office 20 June 2026

Personal details
- Party: Nationalist Party

Annabelle Cilia is a Maltese politician serving as a member of the Parliament of Malta since 2026. She has served as assistant whip and spokesperson for employment of the Nationalist Party since 2026.
