= Andrew Agius =

Maltese politician

Member of the Parliament of Malta
- Incumbent
- Assumed office 20 June 2026
- Constituency: District 7

Personal details
- Born: 1988 or 1989 (age 37–38)
- Party: Nationalist Party
- Parent: Francis Agius (father)

Andrew Agius (born 1988 or 1989) is a Maltese politician serving as a member of the Parliament of Malta since 2026. He has served as spokesperson for veterinary services of the Nationalist Party since 2026. He is the son of former PN MP Francis Agius.
