= Amanda Spiteri Grech =

Maltese politician

Member of Parliament
- In office 12 April 2022 – 27 April 2026
- Constituency: District 4

Personal details
- Party: Labour Party
- Occupation: Politician, lawyer
- Profession: Journalist, lawyer

Amanda Spiteri Grech is a Maltese politician from the Labour Party. She was elected to the Parliament of Malta in the 2022 Maltese general election through the gender quota mechanism.

She is a lawyer by profession and a former One News journalist.

== Legislative work ==
=== Right to be Forgotten Bill ===
In September 2025, Spiteri Grech introduced a Private Member's Bill aimed at establishing the "Right to be Forgotten" for cancer survivors in Malta. The legislation was designed to end lifelong discrimination against individuals who have recovered from oncological diseases, specifically regarding access to financial services, such as bank loans and life insurance, as well as employment opportunities.

The bill proposed a "prescription period" (five years for those diagnosed under 21, and ten years for adults) after which survivors would no longer be required to disclose their medical history to financial institutions. The bill was unanimously enacted by the Parliament of Malta on 30 March 2026.

== See also ==
- List of members of the parliament of Malta, 2022–2027
