= Miriana Calleja Testaferrata de Noto =

Maltese politician

Member of the Parliament of Malta
- Incumbent
- Assumed office 20 June 2026

Personal details
- Born: 1995 or 1996 (age 30–31)
- Party: Nationalist Party

Miriana Calleja Testaferrata de Noto (born 1995 or 1996) is a Maltese politician serving as a member of the Parliament of Malta since 2026. From May to December 2023, she served as president of the youth wing of the Nationalist Party.
