= Justin Schembri =

Maltese politician

Justin Schembri is a Maltese politician from the Nationalist Party. He was elected to the Parliament of Malta in the 2022 Maltese general election from District 8. He is his party's spokesperson on education.

== See also ==
- List of members of the parliament of Malta, 2022–2027
