= Ray Abela =

Maltese politician

Ray Abela is a Maltese politician from the Labour Party who was elected to the Parliament of Malta in the 2022 Maltese general election from District 3.

Abela was owner of the technology-related business TCTC. In 2021, he was appointed Director and CEO of the learning and training academy at The Malta Developers Association (MDA).

== See also ==
- List of members of the parliament of Malta, 2022–2027
