= Graziella Attard Previ =

Maltese politician

MP for District 10
- Incumbent
- Assumed office 2022
- Preceded by: Mark Anthony Sammut

Mayor of Sliema
- In office 29 December 2021 – 2022
- Preceded by: Anthony Chircop
- Succeeded by: John Pillow

Personal details
- Party: Nationalist Party
- Education: University of Malta

Graziella Attard Previ is a Maltese politician from the Nationalist Party. She was elected to the Parliament of Malta in the 2022 Maltese general election from District 10, succeeding fellow party member Mark Anthony Sammut. She was formerly deputy mayor of Sliema.

== Career ==
Attard Previ graduated from the University of Malta. By 2019, she was in the process of earning a master's degree in social policy.

She worked in a children’s home for over 15 years as a social worker. In 2009, she hosted Sahhtek l-Ewwel, a health and wellness television program produced by Watermelon Media and broadcast on TVM. From 2014 to at least 2019, she was president of the PN’s Equal Opportunities Forum.

Attard Previ ran in MP elections in District 10 as early as 2017.

In 2019, the Nationalist Party nominated Attard Previ and Alessia Psaila Zammit to the Technical Committee for the Advancement of Representative Democracy.

In 2021, Attard Previ, then the deputy mayor of Silema, became mayor after former mayor Anthony Chircop resigned in light of being offered a new position.

In 2022, Attard Previ was elected to the Parliament of Malta from District 10, succeeding fellow party member Mark Anthony Sammut. In 2022 and 2024, she was made Shadow Minister for Equality, Civil Liberties and Children’s Rights.

In Parliament, Attard Previ is a member of the Family Affairs Committee. She has spoken in favor of LGBTQ rights and equal opportunities for women. She has also spoken about shortages of social workers in the country, and other issues within the social work industry.

== See also ==
- List of members of the parliament of Malta, 2022–2027
