= Katya De Giovanni =

Maltese politician

Honourable Katya De Giovanni

Member of Parliament
- In office 30 March 2022 – 27 April 2026
- Prime Minister: Robert Abela

Personal details
- Party: Labour
- Education: University of Malta

Katya De Giovanni is a Maltese politician from the Labour Party. She was elected to the Parliament of Malta in the 2022 Maltese general election from District 4.

== See also ==
- List of members of the parliament of Malta, 2022–2027
