= Andy Ellul =

Maltese politician (born 1975)

Honourable Andy Ellul MP

Parliamentary Secretary for Social Dialogue
- In office 30 March 2022 – 25 January 2026

Government Whip
- In office 14 April 2022 – 11 January 2024

Member of Parliament
- Incumbent
- Assumed office 10 January 2022
- Constituency: Third District

Parliamentary Secretary for Social Dialogue and Accommodation
- In office 25 January 2026 – 27 April 2026

Personal details
- Born: 25 March 1975 (age 51)
- Party: Partit Laburista
- Spouse: Claudia Cuschieri
- Children: 1
- Education: University of Malta

Dr Andy Ellul (born 25 March 1975) is a Maltese lawyer. He is the founder and managing partner of the legal and advisory firm Andy Ellul & Associates [10] and a Member of the Parliament of Malta. [3][8]

== Legal career ==
Ellul is a lawyer whose practice focuses on workforce strategy, commercial advice and regulatory matters. [6][10][19] He graduated from the University of Malta with a Bachelor of Arts (B.A.) in Legal and Humanistic Studies, a postgraduate Diploma of Notary Public and a Doctor of Laws (LL.D.), and was admitted to the Bar in 2007. [2] His doctoral thesis, The Regulation of Executive Warrants: A Time of Reform (2006), examined the legal remedies available to commercial and civil creditors in Malta for the enforcement of debts. [30] He is also certified in Trusts Law and Management from the Institute of Financial Services Practitioners (IFSP). He graduated in Canonical Jurisprudence and Procedure from the Ecclesiastical Tribunal of Malta and is admitted to its Albo, which entitles him to plead before the Tribunal.

In 2007 Dr Andy Ellul co-founded Micallef & Ellul Advocates, which he led until 2018. He was then a founding partner of Lex Group [20] before establishing Andy Ellul & Associates, a firm advising on employment, regulatory and commercial matters. [10] He has lectured and examined in the Faculty of Laws at the University of Malta and has chaired several public boards and quasi-judicial bodies. Earlier in his career, he served as Legal and Policy Advisor to the Government of Malta, advising on high-impact legal, regulatory and commercial matters. He also led Maltese delegations at international institutions and high-level forums, representing Malta on matters of strategic importance, including as head of the Maltese delegation to the Council of Europe's Lanzarote Committee. [6]

== Political career ==
Ellul was co-opted to Parliament in January 2022 to fill a vacant seat [1][2] and was later elected in the general election of March 2022 as a Labour Party candidate. [3] On 30 March 2022 he was appointed Junior Minister for Social Dialogue within the Office of the Prime Minister [4][29] and, at the same time, Government Whip, a role he held until January 2024. [5][6] His portfolio was extended to competition and consumer protection, including political responsibility for the Malta Competition and Consumer Affairs Authority (MCCAA), in May 2025 [10][27][28] and also to Accommodation in January 2026. [7] He held the post until Parliament was dissolved in April 2026. [3]

Following the 2026 general election, he returned to Parliament in June 2026. [8] Dr Ellul served on the Public Accounts Committee, the Public Appointments Committee and the House Business Committee [9], as well as the Standing Committee on Standards in Public Life, and currently chairs the Public Appointments Committee. [21]

== Legislation ==
During his time as Junior Minister, a series of employment-law measures were introduced. In 2022, the EU Work-Life Balance Directive was transposed into Maltese law [14], and regulations for the courier and delivery sector introduced a rebuttable presumption of employment and requirements on contracts, payslips, overtime and deductions from wages. [11] In 2023, legislation introduced licensing of temping and outsourcing agencies [12], and the Low Wage Commission, which fell within his portfolio, agreed unanimously to raise the minimum wage to €213.54 a week from 1 January 2024. [13] Later measures modernising employment legislation included equal pay for work of equal value from January 2025 [16], an increase in urgent family leave to 32 hours a year [15], pay-transparency rules for job applicants and employees in 2025 [17] and higher penalties for breaches of employment law. [18] He led the introduction of paid miscarriage leave, in force since 1 January 2026, which grants both partners seven days of leave funded entirely by the State, making Malta one of the first countries to offer state-funded miscarriage leave. [22][23][24] In July 2025 he launched a reform of the Industrial Tribunal, setting up a consultative committee to propose faster decisions and clear legal parameters for compensation awards. [25][26] Other reforms strengthened the Malta Council for Economic and Social Development. [10]

== See also ==
- List of members of the parliament of Malta, 2022–2027
