= Romilda Baldacchino Zarb =

Maltese politician (born 1981)

Honourable Romilda Baldacchino Zarb MP

Member of Parliament
- Incumbent
- Assumed office 7 May 2022

Mayor of Mosta
- In office 24 May 2019 – 19 April 2022
- Preceded by: Keith Cassar
- Succeeded by: Christopher Grech

Personal details
- Born: 24 January 1981 (age 45)
- Party: Labour Party
- Children: 2
- Education: University of Malta

Romilda Baldacchino Zarb MP (born 24 January 1981) is a Maltese politician, pharmacist and former television presenter who represents District 11 in the Parliament of Malta since her election in 2022. She previously served as the mayor of Mosta from 2019 until her election to Parliament in 2022.

== Early life and education ==
Romilda Baldacchino Zarb was born on 24 January 1981, to Emanuel 'Emy' Zarb, a businessman from Mosta.

She studied pharmacy at the University of Malta, which she attended from 1998 until 2004.

== Political career ==
Baldacchino Zarb first stood for election in the 2019 local council elections as a candidate with the Labour Party.

== Television career ==
Romilda Baldacchino Zarb was a co-presenter on the ONE afternoon talk show Kalamita from 2018 until 2020.

== Personal life ==
Baldacchino Zarb is mother to a son and a daughter.

== See also ==
- List of members of the parliament of Malta, 2022–2027
- List of mayors of places in Malta
