= Davina Sammut Hili =

Maltese politician

Davina Sammut Hili (born July 6, 1986, in Floriana) is a Maltese politician from the Labour Party. She was elected to the Parliament of Malta in the 2022 Maltese general election under the gender quota. She formerly served as mayor of Floriana.

== See also ==
- List of members of the parliament of Malta, 2022–2027
