= Mark Anthony Sammut =

Maltese politician and engineer

The Honourable Mark Anthony Sammut MP
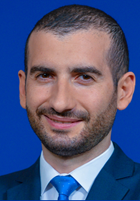
- Official portrait, 2022

Member of Parliament
- Incumbent
- Assumed office 7 May 2022

President of the General Council of the Nationalist Party
- Incumbent
- Assumed office 17 July 2021
- Leader: Bernard Grech
- Preceded by: Ċensu Galea

Personal details
- Born: February 26, 1986 (age 40) Gudja
- Party: Nationalist Party
- Spouse: Diane Sammut née Mifsud
- Children: 2
- Education: University of Malta
- Profession: Engineer
- Website: https://markanthonysammut.com/

Mark Anthony Sammut (born 26 February 1986, Malta), is a Maltese politician, a Member of Parliament and President of the Nationalist Party's General Council. He previously served as a local councillor in Gudja between 2006 and 2022.

== Biography ==
The eldest of three brothers, Sammut grew up in Gudja. He studied at St.Francis' school in Cospicua, St.Paul's Missionary College in Rabat, and G. F. Abela Junior College in Msida, before graduating in electrical engineering at the University of Malta in 2008. He also read for an MSc. in wireless networks with the Queen Mary University of London.

In his youth, he took part in the Grupp Żgħażagħ Gudja (Gudja Youth Group). He is still a member of the ĊAM Youths association.

At age 20, in 2006, Sammut was elected with 205 first preferences at the Gudja local council for the Nationalist Party (Malta). He was re-elected in 2009 with 443 first-preference votes, in 2013 with 544 first-preference votes, and again in 2019 with 487 first-preference votes.

Sammut contested the 2013 Maltese general election on the 4th and 5th districts earning 557 and 582 first-preference votes respectively, without being elected. From 2013 till 2016 Sammut was a member of the executive committee of the Youth Movement of the Nationalist Party (MŻPN) and represented the youth wing in the party's executive committee. He also represented the PN in the national Vote 16 Committee.

In 2015, Sammut was elected in the Nationalist Party (Malta)'s executive committee as a representative of the Party's General Council. He was re-elected in November 2017, when he was also appointed as Executive Committee President.

He was elected President of the Party General Council in July 2021.

At the 2017 Maltese general election he received 1,379 first-preference votes on the 4th district.

At the 2022 Maltese general election he was elected as a Member of Parliament from both the 4th and 10th districts, with 1,904 and 921 first-preference votes respectively, and subsequently appointed as the Opposition's Spokesperson for Energy and Enterprise.

He is married to Diane Sammut, née Mifsud, with whom he has two children, and they reside in Gudja.

== Links ==
- https://markanthonysammut.com/
