= Arnold Cassola =

Maltese politician

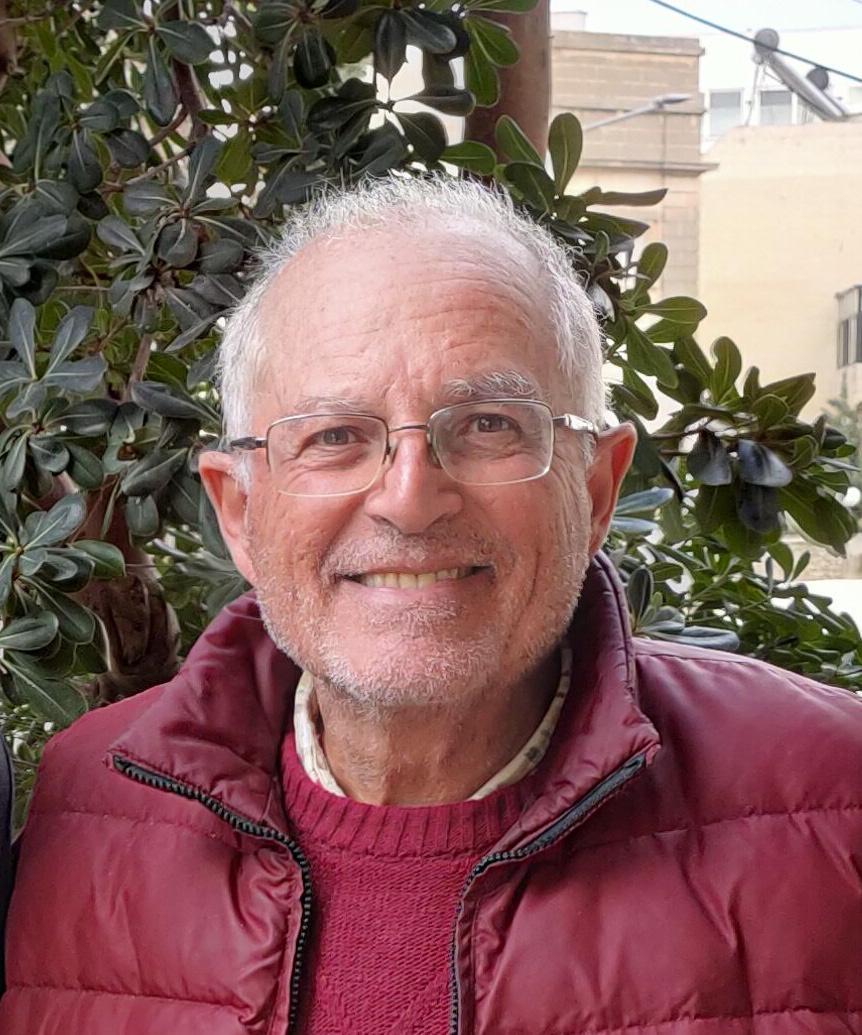

Chairperson of Partit Momentum (political party)
- Incumbent
- Assumed office 17 January 2025
- President: Myriam Spiteri Debono
- Prime Minister: Robert Abela
- Preceded by: Position Established

Secretary General of the European Green Party
- In office 1999–2006
- Succeeded by: Juan Behrend

Chairperson of Alternattiva Demokratika
- In office 2013–2017
- Preceded by: Harry Vassallo
- Succeeded by: Carmel Cacopardo
- In office 2008–2009
- Preceded by: Harry Vassallo
- Succeeded by: Michael Briguglio

Member of Swieqi Local Council
- In office 1994–1996

Personal details
- Born: 21 November 1953 (age 72) Sliema, Malta
- Party: Momentum (2025–present)
- Other political affiliations: Independent (2019–2025); Democratic Alternative (1989–2019)

Arnold Cassola (born November 21, 1953) is a Maltese and Italian independent politician, professor, author and editor of various books and academic papers. Cassola is a professor in Comparative Literature at the University of Malta. He has held elective office and political posts in Malta, Italy and at a European level. Cassola served as leader of Democratic Alternative from 2013 until 2017.

== Maltese politics ==
Cassola was one of the co-founders in 1989 of Democratic Alternative, the green party in Malta. Between 1990 and 1997, he was the Party's delegate to the European Green Party (EGP). He unsuccessfully contested all national elections with the Party since 1992. Between 1994 and 1997, he served as local councillor in Swieqi. His best result in Maltese politics was in the 2004 election for the European Parliament when he obtained 9.33% (or 23,000 votes) of the first-preference votes, just failing to be elected one of Malta's five MEPs.

In July 2008, Cassola was elected Chairperson of the Party after the resignation of Harry Vassallo. In the second elections held in Malta for the European Parliament in 2009, Cassola stood as candidate once more together with another candidate for the Party, Yvonne Ebejer Arqueros. This time the Party polled only 2.34% of the vote. In view of the result, Cassola resigned as Party Chairperson.

However, he remained active in the Party a spokesperson and unsuccessfully contested the 2013 general election. Party Chairperson Michael Briguglio resigned after this election and Cassola was voted again as party chairperson until he resigned in 2017.

Cassola resigned from the party in February 2019 due to differences between himself and the executive committee on the issue of abortion.

Arnold Cassola contested the 2024 European Parliament Elections as an independent candidate. His campaign which only started in the last 21 days of the electoral campaign was titled "Issa ċ-ċans / Now's the chance". Cassola managed to earn 12,706 First Preference votes, and earned 22,941 votes in total. Despite falling short by around 2,000 votes from the Labour MEP Thomas Bajada, he celebrated the result as the best result of an independent candidate in 103 years, and started the process of forming a 'centre-left-green coalition' after seeing the enthusiasm of the people who helped in his campaign.

On 17 January 2025 Arnold Cassola launched a new centrist political party called Momentum. The party aims to tackle issues including corruption and the environment.

== European Green Party ==
Cassola was elected member of the executive committee of the European Green Party in 1997, eventually being elected Secretary General of the executive committee of the (EGP). In the latter post, he served between 1999 and 2006. Between 2001 and 2006, he was one of the three European representatives on the Global Greens Coordination. He has been a European Union electoral observer in various countries in Africa and South America, and editor of the official organ of the European Greens "Green Update" (since 1998).

== Italian politics ==
In Italy, Cassola was a deputy in the Italian Chamber of Deputies elected by Italian expatriates in the Europe constituency with the left-right-centre coalition L'Unione between 2006 and 2008.

== Honours ==
Cassola was made Knight of the Order of Merit of the Italian Republic in 2003 by the Italian President Carlo Azeglio Ciampi.

Political offices
Preceded by Harry Vassallo	Chairperson of Democratic Alternative; 2008 – 2009	Succeeded by Michael Briguglio
