= Ramona Attard =

Maltese politician

The Honourable Ramona Attard MP

Member of Parliament for District 8
- Incumbent
- Assumed office June 22 2026
- Preceded by: Clyde Caruana
- Constituency: District 8

Member of Parliament for District 9
- Incumbent
- Assumed office 22 January 2025
- Preceded by: Randolph De Battista
- Constituency: District 9

Personal details
- Party: Labour Party

Ramona Attard is a Maltese politician from the Labour Party.

== Career ==
Attard is a lawyer by profession. In 2024, she stepped down as president of the Labour party. In January 2025, she was co-opted into the Parliament of Malta to replace Randolph De Battista for the remainder of the 14th Legislature. She contested the 2026 Maltese general election on the Labour Party ticket and was elected to the House of Representatives via a casual election in District 8.

== See also ==
- List of members of the parliament of Malta, 2022–2026
- List of members of the parliament of Malta, 2026–2031
