= Ivan Castillo (politician) =

Maltese politician

Honourable Ivan Castillo MP
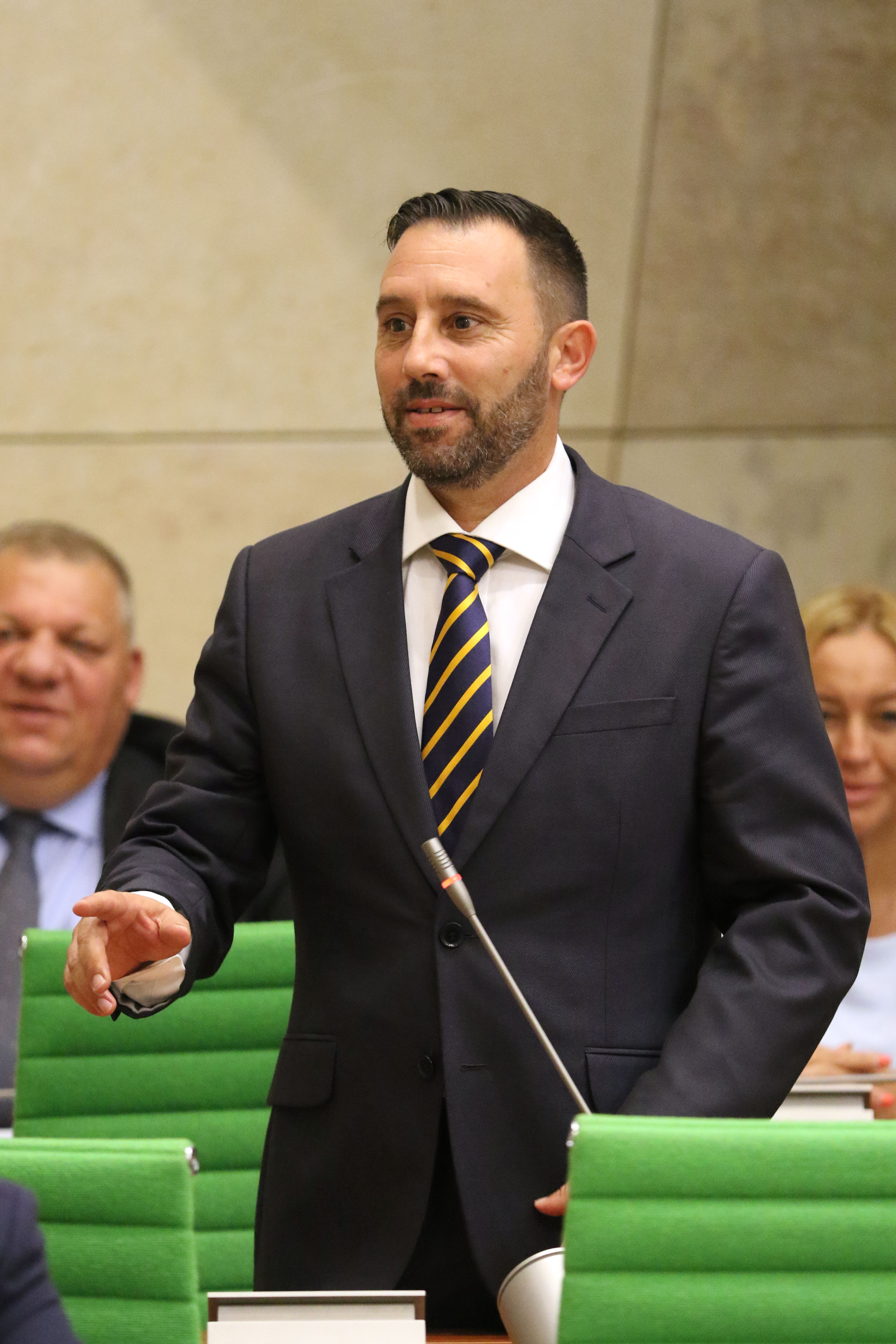
- Ivan Castillo in Parliament in 2022

Member of Parliament
- Incumbent
- Assumed office 7 May 2022
- Constituency: Twelfth District

Personal details
- Party: Nationalist Party
- Spouse: Corinne
- Website: www.ivancastillo.net

Ivan Castillo MP is a Maltese politician from the Nationalist Party. He was elected to the Parliament of Malta in the 2022 Maltese general election from the Twelfth District. He is shadow maritime minister.

Castillo is currently the President of the Nationalist Party Worker's Movement (Maltese: Solidarijetà Ħaddiema Partit Nazzjonalista, SĦPN), having been elected to the post first in 2016 and then again in 2020.

== See also ==
- List of members of the parliament of Malta, 2022–2027
