= Sandra Gauci =

Maltese politician (born 1979)

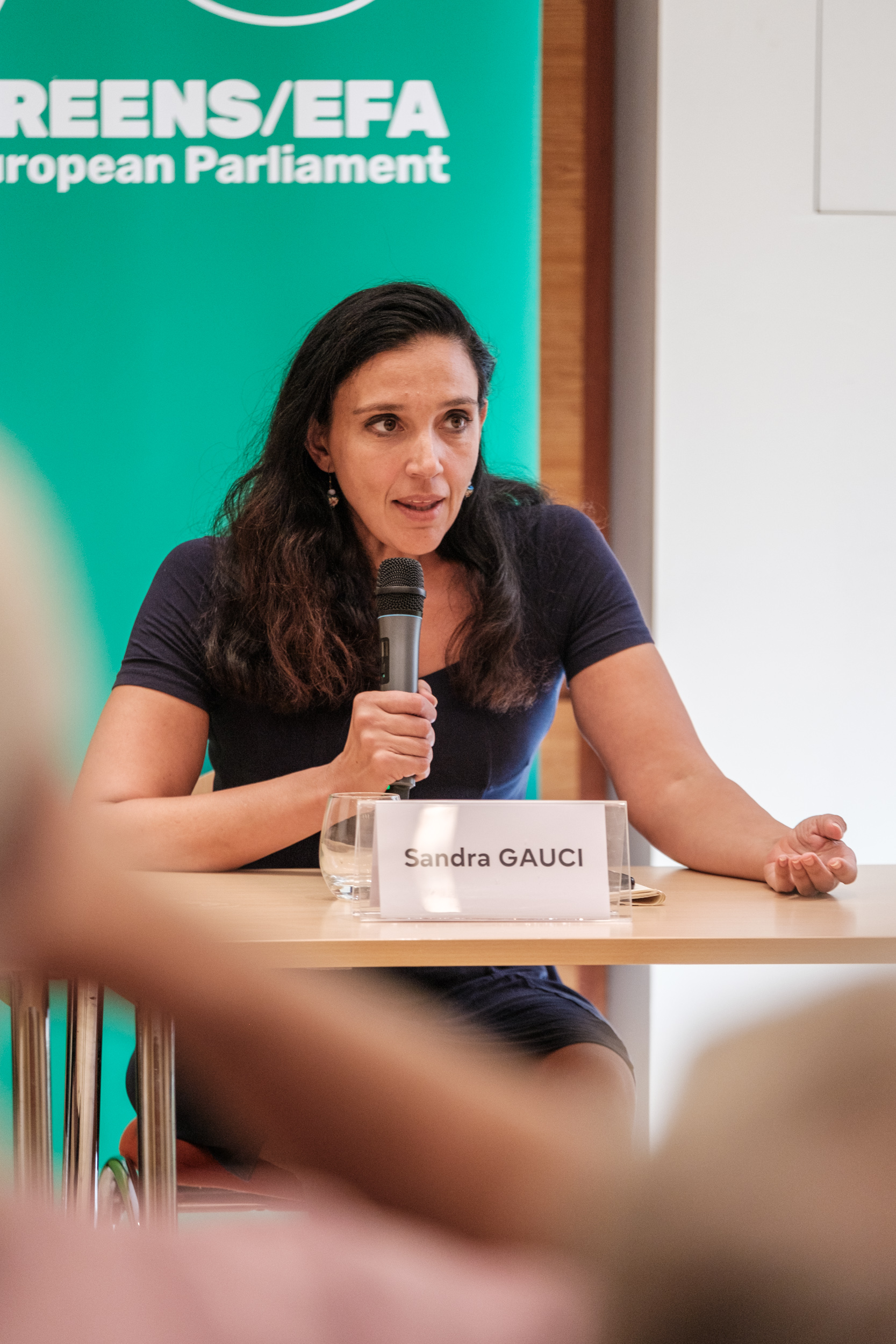
- Sandra Gauci speaking at European Greens at EuroPride in Malta, 2023

Chairperson of AD+PD
- Incumbent
- Assumed office 27 May 2023
- Deputy: Carmel Cacopardo (2023-2024, 2025-); Mina Jack Tolu (2023-2024); Melissa Bagley (2025-)
- Preceded by: Carmel Cacopardo

Deputy Chairperson of AD+PD
- In office 28 May 2022 – 27 May 2023 Serving with Mario Mallia
- Leader: Carmel Cacopardo

Local Councillor for St Paul's Bay with the AD+PD
- Incumbent
- Assumed office 25 June 2024

Personal details
- Born: 20 January 1979 (age 47)
- Party: AD+PD (2021-); Partit Demokratiku (2020-2021)
- Children: 2
- Education: University of Malta (B.Ed, MA); University of Siena
- Occupation: Teacher; politician; internet personality

Sandra Gauci (born 20 January 1979) is a Maltese politician, teacher and internet personality. She originally rose to prominence as an internet comedian with her satirical Facebook show ABS News. She later joined AD+PD and was elected as the party's second chairperson in 2023.

In the 2024 Maltese local elections she was elected as a local councillor for San Pawl il-Baħar.

== Early life and education ==
Sandra Gauci comes from a working-class family of Labour supporters.

Gauci attended the University of Siena on a scholarship on teaching Italian through film.

== Teaching career ==
Gauci has been an Italian teacher in public schools for over 21 years. In February 2020, she claimed censorship after she was ordered by her employer to remove a video critical of PN MP Kristy Debono and teachers' working conditions. Gauci's employer, Kulleġġ San Ġorġ Preca, further gave her an admonishment warning. Gauci was supported by then-Minister for Education Owen Bonnici who spoke to her school's principal to invalidate the admonishment warning.

== Political career ==
Gauci joined the Democratic Party one week before its merger with Alternattiva Demokratika to form AD+PD. She served as deputy secretary-general from 2021 to 2022, and deputy chairperson from 2022 to 2023.

In April 2023, Gauci expressed her interest in the post of ADPD leader, after Carmel Cacopardo stood down. In May, she was elected chairperson during the party's annual general meeting.

As part of her leadership, Gauci has emphasised rebranding ADPD with a new name and image which reflects green, liberal and socialist principles.

In August 2023, the party's youth wing voted to change its name from ADŻ Green Youth to Kollettiv Żgħażagħ EkoXellugin (English: Collective of Young EcoLeftists).

Gauci stood as a candidate for the 2024 European Parliament elections as well as the local elections. She failed to get elected as an MEP, however was later elected to serve on the San Pawl il-Baħar local council. ADPD gained another local council seat won by Ralph Cassar in Ħ'Attard.

In May 2025, Gauci was reconfirmed as chairperson of ADPD.

In August 2025, Gauci successfully proposed a motion in calling on the government to channel tourist eco-tax revenues to the St. Paul's Bay local council.

In May 2026, Gauci obtained 950 votes on the 12th District and 594 votes on the 6th District. The day after the election results were released, Gauci announced that she intended to step away from politics, however, following a vote of confidence, she decided to remain the ADPD leader.

== Personal life ==
Sandra Gauci has 2 children. She is a supporter of AC Milan.
