= Maltese Government 2026–2031 =

2026–2031 elected Maltese government

Third Robert Abela Cabinet
- 24th Cabinet of Malta
- Incumbent
- Date formed: 4 June 2026

People and organisations
- Head of government: Robert Abela
- No. of ministers: 21
- Member party: Labour Party
- Opposition party: Nationalist Party
- Opposition leader: Alex Borg

History
- Election: 2026 general election
- Legislature terms: 15th legislature
- Predecessor: Maltese Government 2022–2026

The Maltese Government 2026–2031 is the incumbent Government of Malta (Maltese: Il-Gvern ta' Malta) as from 2026. It is the third ministry of Prime Minister Robert Abela.

== Cabinet ==
=== June 2026 - Current ===
Portfolio	Minister	Political party	Assumed office	Left office
Prime Minister; Il-Prim Ministru	Robert Abela	Labour	13 January 2020	
Deputy Prime Minister & Minister for Health; Id-Deputat Prim Ministru u l-Ministru għas-Saħħa	Ian Borg	Labour	4 June 2026	
Minister for Accommodation and Lands; Il-Ministru għall-Akkomodazzjoni u l-Artijiet	Owen Bonnici	Labour	4 June 2026	
Minister for Social Policy and the Family; Il-Ministru għall-Politika Soċjali u l-familja	Michael Falzon	Labour	4 June 2026	
Minister for Agriculture, Fisheries and Food Supply; Il-Ministru għall-Agrikoltura, is-Sajd u l-Provvista tal-Ikel	Anton Refalo	Labour	4 June 2026	
Minister for the Economy, Technology and Strategic Projects; Il-Ministru għall-Ekonomija, it-Teknoloġija u Proġetti Strateġiċi	Silvio Schembri	Labour	15 January 2020	
Minister for Inclusion and the Voluntary Sector; Il-Ministru għall-Inklużjoni u l-Volontarjat	Julia Farrugia Portelli	Labour	6 January 2024	
Minister for Gozo; Il-Ministru għal Għawdex	Clint Camilleri	Labour	20 January 2020	
Minister for Education and Sports; Il-Ministru għall-Edukazzjoni u l-Isport	Byron Camilleri	Labour	4 June 2026	
Minister for Energy, the Environment and the Regeneration of the Grand Harbour; Il-Ministru għall-Enerġija, l-Ambjent u r-Riġenerazzjoni tal-Port il-Kbir	Miriam Dalli	Labour	4 June 2026	
Minister for Finance; Il-Ministru għall-Finanzi	Clyde Caruana	Labour	22 November 2020	
Minister for Justice, Research and Innovation; Il-Ministru għall-Ġustizzja, ir-Riċerka u l-Innovazzjoni	Clifton Grima	Labour	4 June 2026	
Minister for Infrastructure, Planning and Employment; Il-Ministru għall-Infrastruttura, l-Ippjanar u x-Xogħol	Jonathan Attard	Labour	4 June 2026	
Minister for Tourism; Il-Ministru għat-Turiżmu	Jo Etienne Abela	Labour	4 June 2026	
Minister for Sustainable Mobility; Il-Ministru għall-Mobbiltà Sostenibbli	Chris Bonett	Labour	4 June 2026	
Minister for Foreign and European Affairs; Il-Ministru għall-Affarijiet Barranin u Ewropej	Chris Fearne	Labour	4 June 2026	
Minister for Local Government and Public Works; Il-Ministru għall-Gvern Lokali u x-Xogħlijiet Pubbliċi	Alison Zerafa Civelli	Labour	4 June 2026	
Minister for European Funds, Social Dialogue and Consumer Protection; Il-Ministru għall-Fondi Ewropej, id-Djalogu Soċjali u l-Protezzjoni tal-Konsumatur	Keith Azzopardi Tanti	Labour	4 June 2026	
Minister for Home Affairs and Security; Il-Ministru għall-Intern u s-Sigurtà	Glenn Bedingfield	Labour	4 June 2026	
Minister for Arts, Culture and National Heritage; Il-Ministru għall-Arti, il-Kultura u l-Wirt Nazzjonali	Malcolm Paul Agius Galea	Labour	4 June 2026	
Minister for Youth, Wellbeing and the Implementation of the Electoral Programme; Il-Ministru għaż-Żgħażagħ, il-Benesseri u l-Implimentazzjoni tal-Programm Elettorali	Omar Farrugia	Labour	4 June 2026	
Minister for Equality and Civil Rights; Il-Ministru għall-Ugwaljanza u d-Drittijiet Ċivili	Rosianne Cutajar	Labour	4 June 2026	

=== Parliamentary Secretaries ===
Portfolio	Parliamentary Secretary	Assisting within the	Political party	Assumed office	Left office
Parliamentary Secretary for Animal Welfare; Is-Segretarju Parlamentari għad-Drittijiet tal-Annimali	Alicia Bugeja Said	Minister for Energy, the Environment and the Regeneration of the Grand Harbour	Labour	4 June 2026	
Parliamentary Secretary for Active Ageing; Is-Segretarju Parlamentari għal- Anzjanita Attiva	Deo Debattista	Office of the Deputy Prime Minister & Minister for Health	Labour	4 June 2026	
