= Maltese Government 2022–2026 =

2022–2026 elected Maltese government

Second Robert Abela Cabinet
- 23rd Cabinet of Malta
- Incumbent
- Date formed: 30 March 2022
- Date dissolved: 27 April 2026

People and organisations
- Head of state: Miriam Spiteri Debono (since 2024)
- Head of government: Robert Abela
- No. of ministers: 18
- Member party: Labour Party
- Opposition party: Nationalist Party
- Opposition leader: Bernard Grech(2020-2025); Alex Borg (since 2025)

History
- Election: 2022 general election
- Legislature terms: 14th legislature
- Predecessor: Maltese Government 2017–22
- Successor: Maltese Government 2026–2031

The Maltese Government 2022–2026 was the Government of Malta (Maltese: Il-Gvern ta' Malta) from 30 March 2022 until 2026. It is the second ministry of Prime Minister Robert Abela. The Maltese government is elected through a General Election for a five-year term. The Labour Party (Partit Laburista) won a majority following a general election which was held on 26 March 2022. The cabinet and parliamentary secretaries for this legislature were initially sworn in on 30 March 2022. Abela has reshuffled his cabinet once, on 6 January 2024.

== Cabinets ==
=== March 2022 – January 2024 ===
Portfolio	Minister	Political party	Assumed office	Left office
Prime Minister; Il-Prim Ministru	Robert Abela	Labour	28 March 2022	
Deputy Prime Minister & Minister for Health; Id-Deputat Prim Ministru u l-Ministru għas-Saħħa	Chris Fearne	Labour	30 March 2022	10 May 2024
Deputy Prime Minister & Minister of Foreign and European Affairs and Trade	Ian Borg	Labour	17 September 2024	
Minister for the National Heritage, the Arts, and Local Government; Il-Ministru għall-Wirt Nazzjonali, l-Arti u l-Gvern Lokali	Owen Bonnici	Labour	30 March 2022	
Minister for Social Policy and Children's Rights; Il-Ministru għall-Politika Soċjali u d-Drittijiet tat-Tfal	Michael Falzon	Labour	30 March 2022	
Minister for Agriculture, Fisheries, and Animal Rights; Il-Ministru għall-Biedja, is-Sajd u d-Drittijiet tal-Annimali	Anton Refalo	Labour	30 March 2022	
Minister for Social & Affordable Accommodation; Il-Ministru għall-Akkomodazzjoni Soċjali u Affordabli	Roderick Galdes	Labour	30 March 2022	
Minister for the Economy, European Funds and Lands; Il-Ministru għall-Ekonomija, il-Fondi Ewropej u l-Artijiet	Silvio Schembri	Labour	30 March 2022	
Minister for Inclusion, Voluntary Organisations and Consumer Rights; Il-Ministru għall-Inklużjoni, l-Għaqdiet Volontarji u d-Drittijiet tal-Konsumnatur	Julia Farrugia Portelli	Labour	30 March 2022	
Minister for Transport, Infrastructure and Capital Projects; Il-Ministru għat-Trasport, l-Infrastruttura u l-Proġetti Kapitali	Aaron Farrugia	Labour	30 March 2022	
Minister for Gozo; Il-Ministru għal Għawdex	Clint Camilleri	Labour	30 March 2022	
Minister for Home Affairs, Security, Reforms and Equality; Il-Ministru għall-Affarijiet Interni, is-Sigurtà, ir-Riformi u l-Ugwaljanza	Byron Camilleri	Labour	30 March 2022	
Minister for Tourism; Il-Ministru għat-Turiżmu	Clayton Bartolo	Labour	30 March 2022	
Minister for the Environment, Energy and Enterprise; Il-Ministru għall-Ambjent, l-Enerġija u l-Intrapriża	Miriam Dalli	Labour	30 March 2022	
Minister for Finance and Employment; Il-Ministru għall-Finanzi u x-Xogħol	Clyde Caruana	Labour	30 March 2022	
Minister for Education, Sport, Youth, Research and Innovation; Il-Ministru għall-Edukazzjoni, l-Isport, iż-Żgħażagħ, ir-Riċerka u l-Innovazzjoni	Clifton Grima	Labour	30 March 2022	
Minister for Public Works and Planning; Il-Ministru għax-Xogħlijiet Pubbliċi u l-Ippjanar	Stefan Zrinzo Azzopardi	Labour	30 March 2022	
Minister for Justice; Il-Ministru għall-Ġustizzja	Jonathan Attard	Labour	30 March 2022	
Minister of Health; Il-Ministru għall-Anzjanità Attiva	Jo Etienne Abela	Labour	30 March 2022	

=== Parliamentary Secretaries ===
Portfolio	Parliamentary Secretary	Assisting within the	Political party	Assumed office	Left office
Parliamentary Secretary for Social Dialogue; Is-Segretarju Parlamentari għad-Djalogu Soċjali	Andy Ellul	Office of the Prime Minister	Labour	30 March 2022	
Parliamentary Secretary for Local Government; Is-Segretarju Parlamentari għall-Gvern Lokali	Alison Zerafa Civelli	Ministry for the National Heritage, the Arts, and Local Government	Labour	30 March 2022	
Parliamentary Secretary for European Funds; Is-Segretarju Parlamentari għall-Fondi Ewropej	Chris Bonett	Ministry for the Economy, European Funds and Lands	Labour	30 March 2022	
Parliamentary Secretary for Youth, Research and Innovation; Is-Segretarju Parlamentari għaż-Żgħażagħ, ir-Riċerka u l-Innovazzjoni	Keith Azzopardi Tanti	Ministry for Education, Sport, Youth, Research and Innovation	Labour	30 March 2022	
Parliamentary Secretary for Reforms and Equality; Is-Segretarju Parlamentari għar-Riformi u l-Ugwaljanza	Rebecca Buttigieg	Ministry for Home Affairs, Security, Reforms and Equality	Labour	14 April 2022	
Parliamentary Secretary for Fishing, Aquaculture and Animal Rights; Is-Segretarju Parlamentari għas-Sajd, l-Akwakultura u d-Drittijiet tal-Annimali	Alicia Bugeja Said	Ministry for Agriculture, Fisheries, and Animal Rights	Labour	14 April 2022	

=== January 2024 – present ===
Portfolio	Minister	Political party	Assumed office	Left office
Prime Minister; Il-Prim Ministru	Robert Abela	Labour	28 March 2022	
Deputy Prime Minister & Minister for European Funds, Social Dialogue and Consumer Protection; Id-Deputat Prim Ministru u l-Ministru għall-Fondi Ewropej, id-Djalogu Soċjali u l-Protezzjoni tal-Konsumatur	Chris Fearne	Labour	6 January 2024	10 May 2024
Minister for the National Heritage, the Arts, and Local Government; Il-Ministru għall-Wirt Nazzjonali, l-Arti u l-Gvern Lokali	Owen Bonnici	Labour	30 March 2022	
Minister for Foreign & European Affairs, and Trade; Il-Ministru għall-Affarijiet Barranin u Ewropej, u l-Kummerċ	Ian Borg	Labour	30 March 2022	
Minister for Social Policy and Children's Rights; Il-Ministru għall-Politika Soċjali u d-Drittijiet tat-Tfal	Michael Falzon	Labour	30 March 2022	
Minister for Agriculture, Fisheries, and Animal Rights; Il-Ministru għall-Biedja, is-Sajd u d-Drittijiet tal-Annimali	Anton Refalo	Labour	30 March 2022	
Minister for Social & Affordable Accommodation; Il-Ministru għall-Akkomodazzjoni Soċjali u Affordabli	Roderick Galdes	Labour	30 March 2022	
Minister for the Economy, Enterprise and Strategic Projects; Il-Ministru għall-Ekonomija, l-Intrapriża u Proġetti Strateġiċi	Silvio Schembri	Labour	8 January 2024	
Minister for Inclusion, Voluntary Organisations; Il-Ministru għall-Inklużjoni, u l-Volontarjat	Julia Farrugia Portelli	Labour	8 January 2024	
Minister for Gozo and Planning; Il-Ministru għal Għawdex u l-Ippjanar	Clint Camilleri	Labour	8 January 2024	
Minister for Home Affairs, Security, Reforms and Equality; Il-Ministru għall-Affarijiet Interni, is-Sigurtà, ir-Riformi u l-Ugwaljanza	Byron Camilleri	Labour	30 March 2022	
Minister for Tourism and Public Cleanliness; Il-Ministru għat-Turiżmu u l-Indafa Pubblika	Clayton Bartolo	Labour	8 January 2024	
Minister for the Environment, Energy and the Regeneration of the Grand Harbour; Il-Ministru għall-Ambjent, l-Enerġija u r-Riġenerazzjoni tal-Port il-Kbir	Miriam Dalli	Labour	30 March 2022	
Minister for Finance and Employment; Il-Ministru għall-Finanzi u x-Xogħol	Clyde Caruana	Labour	30 March 2022	
Minister for Education, Sport, Youth, Research and Innovation; Il-Ministru għall-Edukazzjoni, l-Isport, iż-Żgħażagħ, ir-Riċerka u l-Innovazzjoni	Clifton Grima	Labour	30 March 2022	
Minister for Lands and the Implementation of the Electoral Programme; Il-Ministru għall-Artijiet u għall-Implimentazzjoni tal-Programm Elettorali	Stefan Zrinzo Azzopardi	Labour	8 January 2024	
Minister for Justice and Reform of the Construction Sector; Il-Ministru għall-Ġustizzja u r-Riforma tas-Settur tal-Kostruzzjoni	Jonathan Attard	Labour	8 January 2024	
Minister for Health and Active Ageing; Il-Ministru għas-Saħħa u l-Anzjanità Attiva	Jo Etienne Abela	Labour	8 January 2024	
Minister for Transport, Infrastructure and Public Works; Il-Ministru għat-Trasport, l-Infrastruttura u x-Xogħlijiet Pubbliċi	Chris Bonett	Labour	8 January 2024	

=== Parliamentary Secretaries ===
Portfolio	Parliamentary Secretary	Assisting within the	Political party	Assumed office	Left office
Parliamentary Secretary for Social Dialogue; Is-Segretarju Parlamentari għad-Djalogu Soċjali	Andy Ellul	Office of the Prime Minister	Labour	30 March 2022	
Parliamentary Secretary for Local Government; Is-Segretarju Parlamentari għall-Gvern Lokali	Alison Zerafa Civelli	Ministry for the National Heritage, the Arts, and Local Government	Labour	30 March 2022	
Parliamentary Secretary for Youth, Research and Innovation; Is-Segretarju Parlamentari għaż-Żgħażagħ, ir-Riċerka u l-Innovazzjoni	Keith Azzopardi Tanti	Ministry for Education, Sport, Youth, Research and Innovation	Labour	30 March 2022	
Parliamentary Secretary for Reforms and Equality; Is-Segretarju Parlamentari għar-Riformi u l-Ugwaljanza	Rebecca Buttigieg	Ministry for Home Affairs, Security, Reforms and Equality	Labour	14 April 2022	
Parliamentary Secretary for Fishing, Aquaculture and Animal Rights; Is-Segretarju Parlamentari għas-Sajd, l-Akwakultura u d-Drittijiet tal-Annimali	Alicia Bugeja Said	Ministry for Agriculture, Fisheries, and Animal Rights	Labour	14 April 2022	
Parliamentary Secretary for Active Ageing; Is-Segretarju Parlamentari għax-Xogħlijiet Pubbliċi	Malcolm Paul Agius Galea	Ministry for Health and Active Ageing	Labour	8 January 2024	
Parliamentary Secretary for Public Works; Is-Segretarju Parlamentari għall-Anzjanità Attiva	Omar Farrugia	Ministry for Transport, Infrastructure and Public Works	Labour	8 January 2024	
Parliamentary Secretary for Public Cleanliness; Is-Segretarju Parlamentari għall-Indafa Pubblika	Glenn Bedingfield	Ministry for Tourism and Public Cleanliness	Labour	8 January 2024	
