= List of members of the parliament of Malta, 2022–2026 =

List of current MPs of Malta

This is a list of former members of the Maltese House of Representatives elected to the 14th legislature in the 2022 Maltese general election.

In the Parliament, the Labour Party holds a majority of seats after securing a third consecutive victory: 44 are members of the Labour Party, and 35 of the Nationalist Party.

== Members ==
The following are the 79 members, 65 of which were elected in the 13 districts, and 14 of which received a seat per the provisions laid out in the Constitution of Malta:

Constituency	Labour	Nationalist	Independent
District 1	Keith Azzopardi Tanti; Deo Debattista; Aaron Farrugia	Darren Carabott; Mario de Marco	
District 2	Robert Abela; Christopher Agius; Alison Zerafa Civelli; Glenn Bedingfield	Stephen Spiteri	
District 3	Chris Fearne; Carmelo Abela; Andy Ellul; Ray Abela	Carmelo Mifsud Bonnici	
District 4	Byron Camilleri; Jonathan Attard; Chris Bonett; Katya De Giovanni	Mark Anthony Sammut	
District 5	Miriam Dalli; Owen Bonnici; Stefan Zrinzo Azzopardi; Omar Farrugia	Stanley Zammit	
District 6	Silvio Schembri; Roderick Galdes; Rosianne Cutajar	Jerome Caruana Cilia; Ryan Callus	
District 7	Ian Borg; Julia Farrugia Portelli; Malcolm Paul Agius Galea	Rebekah Cilia; Charles Azzopardi	
District 8	Edward Zammit Lewis; Clyde Caruana	Beppe Fenech Adami; Adrian Delia; Justin Schembri	
District 9	Rebecca Buttigieg; Randolph De Battista	Karol Aquilina; Graziella Attard Previ; Ivan J Bartolo	
District 10	Clifton Grima; Michael Falzon	Joe Giglio; Albert Buttigieg; Graham Bencini	
District 11	Alex Muscat; Romilda Baldacchino Zarb	David Agius; Bernard Grech; Ivan Bartolo	
District 12	Michael Farrugia	Ivan Castillo; Robert Cutajar; Graziella Galea	Clayton Bartolo
District 13	Clint Camilleri; Anton Refalo; Jo Etienne Abela	Alex Borg; Chris Said	
Additional members (Article 52 to compensate for party disproportionality)		Toni Bezzina; Ian Vassallo Hagi	
Additional members (Article 52(A): under-represented sex) (Note: Article 52(A) of the Constitution of Malta, added before the 2022 elections, provides for up to 12 additional seats for candidates from "the under-represented sex" in case one of both makes up less than 40% of the elected MPs. The full slate of women was announced by the Electoral commission on 12 April, bringing the number of seats in the parliament to 79.)	Alicia Bugeja Said; Cressida Galea; Abigail Camilleri; Amanda Spiteri Grech; Naomi Cachia; Davina Sammut Hili	Janice Chetcuti; Paula Mifsud Bonnici; Julie Zahra; Bernice Bonello; Claudette Buttigieg; Eve Borg Bonello	

== Co-opted members ==
- Ramona Attard
