= Rebecca Buttigieg =

Maltese politician (born 1993)

Honourable Rebecca Buttigieg MP
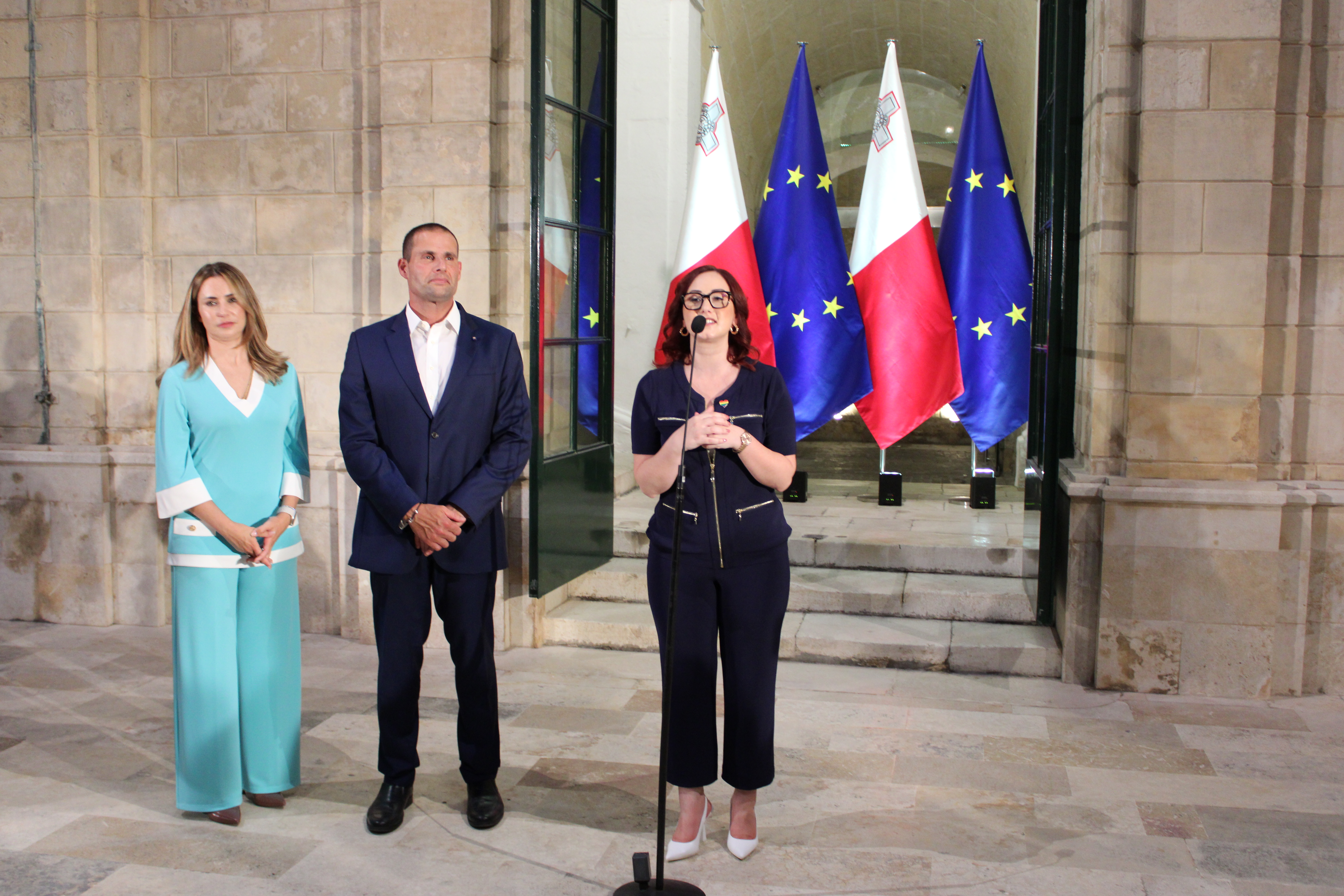
- Buttigieg (right) at EuroPride Malta 2023 with Lydia and Robert Abela

Parliamentary Secretary for Reforms and Equality
- In office 14 May 2022 – 27 April 2026

Member of Parliament
- Incumbent
- Assumed office 7 May 2022

Personal details
- Born: 2 December 1993 (age 32)
- Party: Labour Party
- Spouse: Andrea Nurchi (m. 2021)
- Children: 1
- Education: University of Malta (BA); University of Edinburgh (MSc)
- Occupation: Politician

Rebecca Buttigieg MP (born 2 December 1993) is a Maltese politician from the Labour Party who is currently serving as Parliamentary Secretary for Reforms and Equality in the Maltese Government. She was elected to the Parliament of Malta in the 2022 general election.

== Career ==
Buttigieg began her career at the Parliamentary Assembly of the Mediterranean. She served as a Policy Officer at the Permanent Representation of Malta to the European Union when Malta served as president of the Council of the European Union in 2017. That year she started work as Spokesperson for the Ministry for Economy.

She was elected to the Parliament of Malta in the 2022 general election. In Parliament, she is a member of the Foreign and European Affairs Committee. She is also the Parliamentary Secretary for Reforms and Equality. In this role, she has promised evaluation of cannabis reform and smoking inside and for there to be papers by the governments on euthanasia. She has also supported LGBTIQ+ rights and taking a more inclusive approach for the community, which she has stated are fundamental human rights. In addition, Buttigieg has supported looser restrictions on abortion, especially when women are experiencing complications during pregnancy, which she has stated gives prospective mothers "peace of mind".

In January 2025, Buttigieg was named a European Young Leader by Friends of Europe.

== Personal life ==
Buttigieg graduated from the University of Malta with a Bachelor of Arts degree in International Relations, and graduated from the University of Edinburgh in 2015 with a Master of Science degree in Global Crime, Justice and Security.

Buttigieg and her husband, Andrea, have one daughter, born in 2024.

== See also ==
- List of members of the parliament of Malta, 2022–2027
