= Chris Bonett =

Maltese politician (born 1982)

Honorable Chris Bonett MP
- Bonett in 2022

Minister for Sustainable mobility
- Incumbent
- Assumed office 4 June 2026
- Prime Minister: Robert Abela
- Preceded by: Office Established

Minister for Transport, Infrastructure and Public Works
- In office 6 January 2024 – 4 June 2026
- Prime Minister: Robert Abela
- Preceded by: Aaron Farrugia
- Succeeded by: Chris Bonett (With a rebranding of the Ministry)

Member of Parliament
- Incumbent
- Assumed office 26 March 2022
- Constituency: Fourth District (2022–2026); Third District (2026–present)

Parliamentary Secretary for European Funds
- In office 30 March 2022 – 6 January 2024
- Prime Minister: Robert Abela

Personal details
- Born: 28 January 1982 (age 44)
- Party: Partit Laburista
- Spouse: Dr. Maxilene Bonett
- Children: 2
- Education: University of Malta
- Occupation: Lawyer; politician

Chris Bonett (born 28 January 1982) is a Maltese politician from the Labour Party. He was elected to the Parliament of Malta in the 2022 Maltese general election from District 4 and elected from the third district in 2026 and this is currently minister of transport. He was appointed Parliamentary Secretary for European Funds in the Maltese Government.

== See also ==
- List of members of the parliament of Malta, 2022–2026
