= Aaron Farrugia =

Maltese entrepreneur and politician (born 1980)

MP Aaron Farrugia
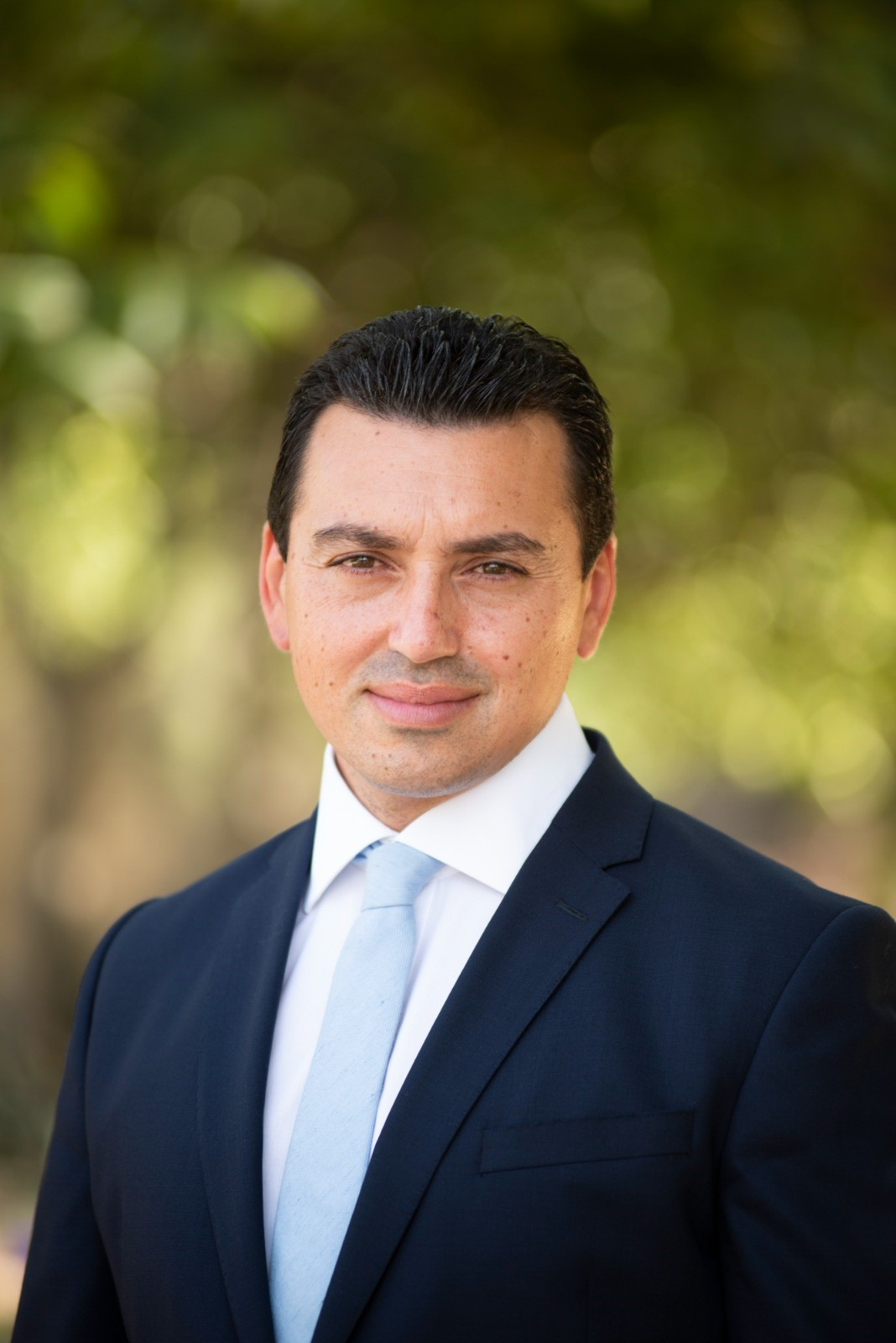
- Official portrait, 2022

Permanent Representative of Malta to the International Maritime Organisation
- Incumbent
- Assumed office 15 May 2024
- Preceded by: Ivan Sammut

Minister for Transport, Infrastructure and Capital Projects
- In office 30 March 2022 – 8 January 2024
- Prime Minister: Robert Abela
- Preceded by: Ian Borg
- Succeeded by: Chris Bonett

Minister for the Environment, Climate Change and Planning
- In office 15 January 2020 – 26 March 2022
- Prime Minister: Robert Abela
- Preceded by: José Herrera
- Succeeded by: Miriam Dalli

Parliamentary Secretary for European Funds and Social Dialogue
- In office 8 June 2017 – 13 January 2020
- Prime Minister: Joseph Muscat
- Preceded by: Ian Borg
- Succeeded by: Stefan Zrinzo Azzopardi

Member of the Maltese Parliament
- In office June 2017 – April 2026

Personal details
- Born: 1 January 1980 (age 46) St. Julians
- Party: Labour (national); Socialists & Democrats (European)
- Education: University of Malta
- Website: aaronfarrugia.com

Aaron Farrugia (born 1 January 1980) is an Entrepreneur, former Minister Maltese and former Member of Parliament Partit Laburista (Labour Party). He is the founder and CEO of ECONOMIQ GROUP and Malta’s Permanent Representative to the International Maritime Organization. He previously served as Minister for Transport, Infrastructure and Capital Projects and Minister for the Environment, Climate Change & Planning in Prime Minister Robert Abela’s cabinet and served as Parliamentary Secretary for European Funds and Social Dialogue in former Prime Minister Joseph Muscat’s cabinet.

He was elected as a member of the Parliament in June 2017 and was re-elected for a second consecutive time in the 2022 General Election. In Parliament he served as head of the Maltese Delegation in the Parliamentary Assembly for the Mediterranean and member for the Foreign and European Affairs committee during the thirteenth legislature.

An economist and a lawyer, Farrugia worked as a policy Advisor to the members of the Maltese Delegation in the European Committee of the Regions and later on as the Chief Executive Officer (CEO) of the Malta Freeport Corporation

Farrugia served in a number of positions in the Labour Party, mainly as an elected member of the Administrative Council and National Executive Committee, founder of the Labour Party think-tank Fondazzjoni IDEAT and President of the Labour Youth Forum.

== Biography ==
=== Studies and personal life ===
Farrugia obtained a B.A. with Honours in Banking & Finance at the University of Malta in 2002 and a M.A. in European Politics, Economics and Law at the same university in 2005. He then read for a Doctorate of Laws degree. He graduated in 2017 with a doctoral thesis on direct democracy.

Aaron Farrugia was a visiting lecturer at the Faculty of Economics, Management and Accountancy of the University of Malta for a number of years. He taught Politics, Political Campaigning, policy making and Governance.

Aaron Farrugia has two daughters, Petra, born in 2012 and Angelica, born in 2018.

=== Political career ===
During his student days Farrugia served as the Secretary General of Pulse, a social democrat student organisation (1998-2001)and Financial Secretary of the Maltese National Youth Council (2004 and 2005).

Farrugia joined the Malta Labour Party in 2001 and served as Deputy President (2000-2001) and then as President of the Labour Youth Forum (Forum Żgħazagħ Laburisti) between 2002–2004 and 2006–2008.

In 2005 Farrugia was elected as Deputy Mayor of the Ta’ Xbiex Local Council.

In 2008 he was elected as education secretary in the new Labour Party executive, and coordinated the compilation of the 2013 party manifesto, besides founding and chairing the party think tank, Fondazzjoni Ideat, between 2009 and 2011.

Farrugia was elected for the first time as a Member of Parliament in the 2017 general election, which he contested on 1st District. During his first legislature as a member of Parliament, Farrugia served as Parliamentary Secretary for European Funds and Social Dialogue and as Minister for the Environment, Climate Change and Planning after a cabinet reshuffle in January 2020. Farrugia was elected for a second consecutive time as a Member of Parliament in 2022 and was entrusted with the Transport, Infrastructure and Capital Projects portfolio in Prime Minister Robert Abela's Cabinet.

Farrugia expressed support for a change towards a first past the post system, a separate list to increase the number of women in Parliament, and for higher salaries for Members of Parliament.

=== Memberships ===
Farrugia is an Atlantic Forum Young Leader Alumnus (2011), a United States of America International Visitor Leadership Program alumnus (2012) and a Friends of Europe (40 under 40) alumnus (2017). Farrugia is also a member of the Malta-United States Alumni Association (MUSAA).
