= Alicia Bugeja Said =

Maltese politician

Honourable Alicia Bugeja Said MP
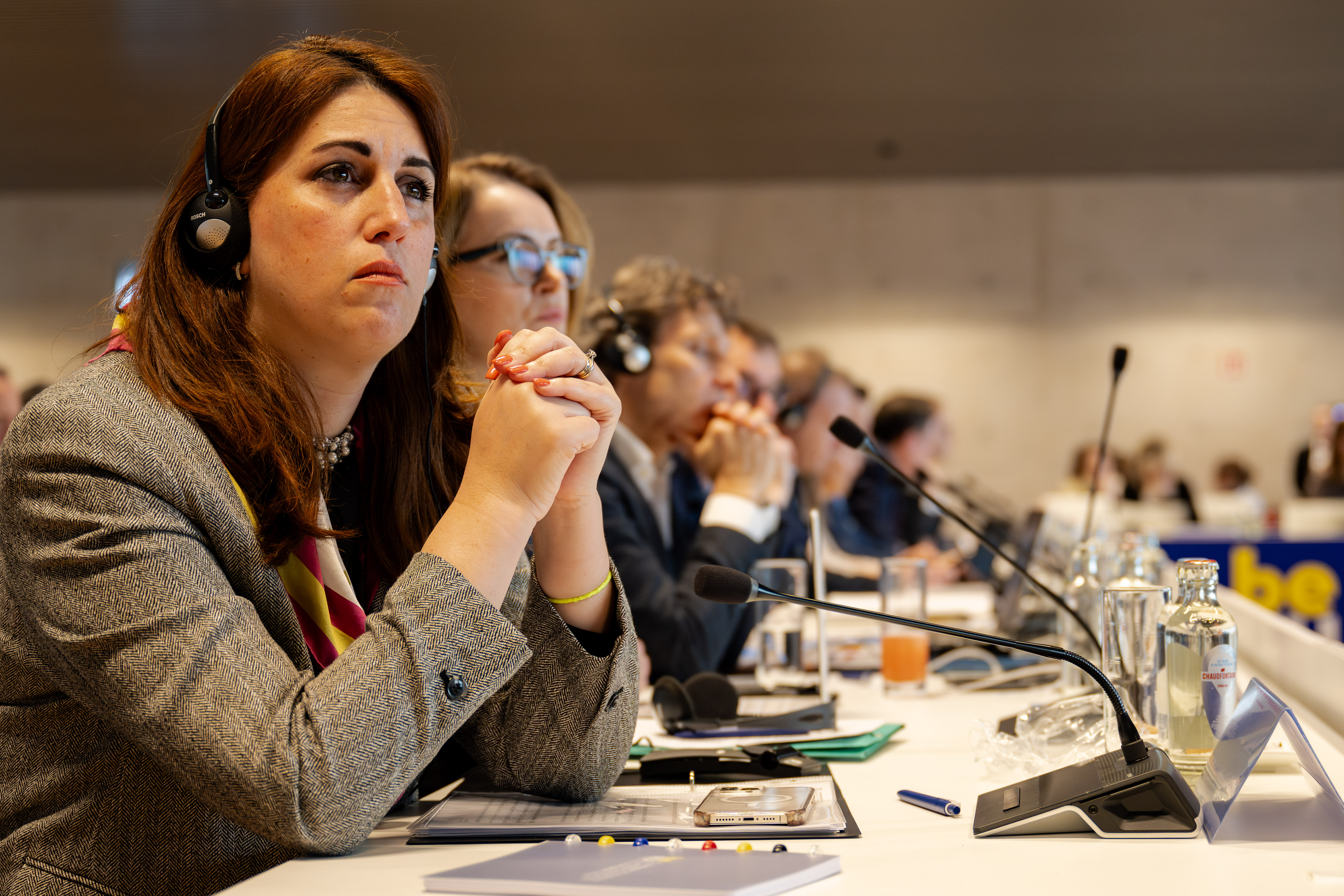
- Alicia Bugeja Said at the informal meeting of Fisheries Ministers in March 2024.

Parliamentary Secretary for Fisheries, Aquaculture and Animal Welfare
- In office 14 April 2022 – 4 June 2026
- Prime Minister: Robert Abela
- Preceded by: Clint Camilleri
- Succeeded by: Office abolished

Member of Parliament
- Incumbent
- Assumed office 12 April 2022

Parliamentary Secretary for Animal Welfare within the Ministry for Energy, the Environment and Grand Harbour Regeneration
- Incumbent
- Assumed office 4 June 2026
- Prime Minister: Robert Abela

Personal details
- Born: Alicia Said; 8 October 1987 (age 38) Mġarr, Malta
- Party: Partit Laburista
- Spouse: Malcolm Bugeja
- Children: 1
- Education: University of Malta; University of Kent; Memorial University of Newfoundland
- Occupation: Politician; scientist; fishing researcher

Alicia Bugeja Said MP (born 8 October 1987 in Mgarr) is a Maltese politician and fishing researcher from the Labour Party.

== Early life and education ==
Bugeja Said was born into a working-class family of farmers and fishermen in Malta. After finishing her tertiary education in Malta, she obtained her Doctoral degree (PhD) from the University of Kent in the United Kingdom in 2016. Successively, in 2017 she pursued a post-doctoral position at the Memorial University of Newfoundland in Canada, and in 2019 she moved to Brest in France to conduct further research with IFREMER. She has published a number of academic articles and edited a few books, and participated in various conferences worldwide.

== Political career ==
She was elected to the Parliament of Malta in the 2022 Maltese general election under the gender quota. She was appointed Parliamentary Secretary for Fisheries, Aquaculture and Animal Rights in the Maltese Government.

== Controversies ==
Bugeja Said faced scrutiny for receiving donations from Malta's top fish farm operators during her 2022 electoral campaign, while in her position as director of the fisheries department. She responded that she has "no conflict of interest".

In July 2023, Alicia Bugeja Said was reported by Arnold Cassola to the Commissioner for Standards in Public Life over a breach of ethics. Bugeja Said had advertised a Swimming with Tuna event hosted by the Ministry of Fisheries, Aquaculture and Animal Welfare for their employees, using her personal name and logo. In September, The Commissioner found her to be in breach of ethics and ordered Bugeja Said to submit a written apology.

== Personal life ==
Bugeja Said is married to Malcolm Bugeja. Together they have a daughter, Margaux, born 26 February 2023.

== See also ==
- List of members of the parliament of Malta, 2022–2027
