= Malcolm Paul Agius Galea =

Maltese politician

Malcolm Paul Agius Galea (born 12 August 1982 in Malta) is a Maltese politician from the Labour Party, serving since June 2026 as Minister for Arts, Culture and National Heritage.

== Professional and family life ==
Malcolm Paul Galea graduated from medical school in 2005 and practiced since as the only family doctor in his hometown Ħaż-Żebbuġ.

He describes himself as a "lifelong festa enthusiast".

In 2012 Galea was recorded as a director of the Med Trading Ltd company.

Galea married Juanita Agius, a medical doctor specialised in anaesthesia. In January 2026, energy minister Miriam Dalli appointed Juanita Agius Galea on the board of Malta's Water Services Corporation (WSC), in a cross-appointment that circumvents the ministerial code of ethics, which forbids ministers and parliamentary secretaries from appointing their own close family members. Juanita Agius Galea also holds a role in WSC subsidiary ClearFlowPlus.

== Political career ==
Malcolm Paul Galea was elected in 2019 as mayor of Żebbuġ. He opposed the road widening works in Wied Qirda, calling for preservation of nature.

In 2021 he added his wife's maiden surname, Agius, ahead of his own, Galea, which allowed him to spring to the top of the ballot sheet in alphabetical order. He stated the name change was "a purely personal decision". Other politicians, including Alex Agius Saliba, had done the same to benefit from "donkey vote" effect.

Agius Galea was elected to the Parliament of Malta in the 2022 Maltese general election from District 7.

From January 2024 to April 2026, Agius Galea served as Parliamentary Secretary for Active Ageing.

He was reelected in the 2026 Maltese general election and appointed in June 2026 as Minister of Arts, Culture and National Heritage in the third cabinet led by Robert Abela.

In November 2026 he gave remarks at the Festival of Ideas, stating that the first months in office had been "traumatic", questioning public funding for the Culture sector and claiming that creativity could be dangerous and should not go beyond norms. His statements led to uproar in the cultural sphere and calls for resignation. Agius Galea refused to resign or apologise, while acknowledging he "could have chosen better words". Malta Today labelled him as "not fit for purpose".

== See also ==
- List of members of the parliament of Malta, 2022–2027
