= Alison Zerafa Civelli =

Maltese politician

Alison Zerafa Civelli MP

Minister for Local Government and Public Works
- Incumbent
- Assumed office 2026
- Prime Minister: Robert Abela

Parliamentary Secretary for Local Government
- In office 2022–2026
- Prime Minister: Robert Abela

Member of the Parliament of Malta for District 2
- Incumbent
- Assumed office 2022

Personal details
- Party: Labour

Alison Zerafa Civelli is a Maltese politician from the Labour Party. She has been a Member of Parliament representing District 2 since the 2022 Maltese general election.

== Political career ==
She serves as Parliamentary Secretary for Local Government in the Maltese Government.

== Personal life ==
Her sister Lydia Abela is the wife of the Prime Minister of Malta Robert Abela.

== See also ==
- List of members of the parliament of Malta, 2022–2027
