= Keith Azzopardi Tanti =

Maltese politician

Member of the Parliament of Malta
- Incumbent
- Assumed office 2022
- Constituency: District 1

Parliamentary Secretary for Youth, research and Innovation
- In office 2022 – 27 April 2026

Minister for EU Funds, Social Dialogue and Consumer Protection
- Incumbent
- Assumed office 4 June 2026
- Preceded by: Stefan Zrinzo Azzopardi

Personal details
- Born: 17 March 1984 (age 42)
- Party: Labour

Keith Azzopardi Tanti (born 17 March 1984) is a Maltese politician from the Labour Party. He was elected to the Parliament of Malta representing District 1 in the 2022 general election. He previously served as Parliamentary Secretary for Youth, Research and Innovation in the Maltese Government.
