= Jo Etienne Abela =

Maltese politician (born 1975)

The Honourable Jo Etienne Abela MP
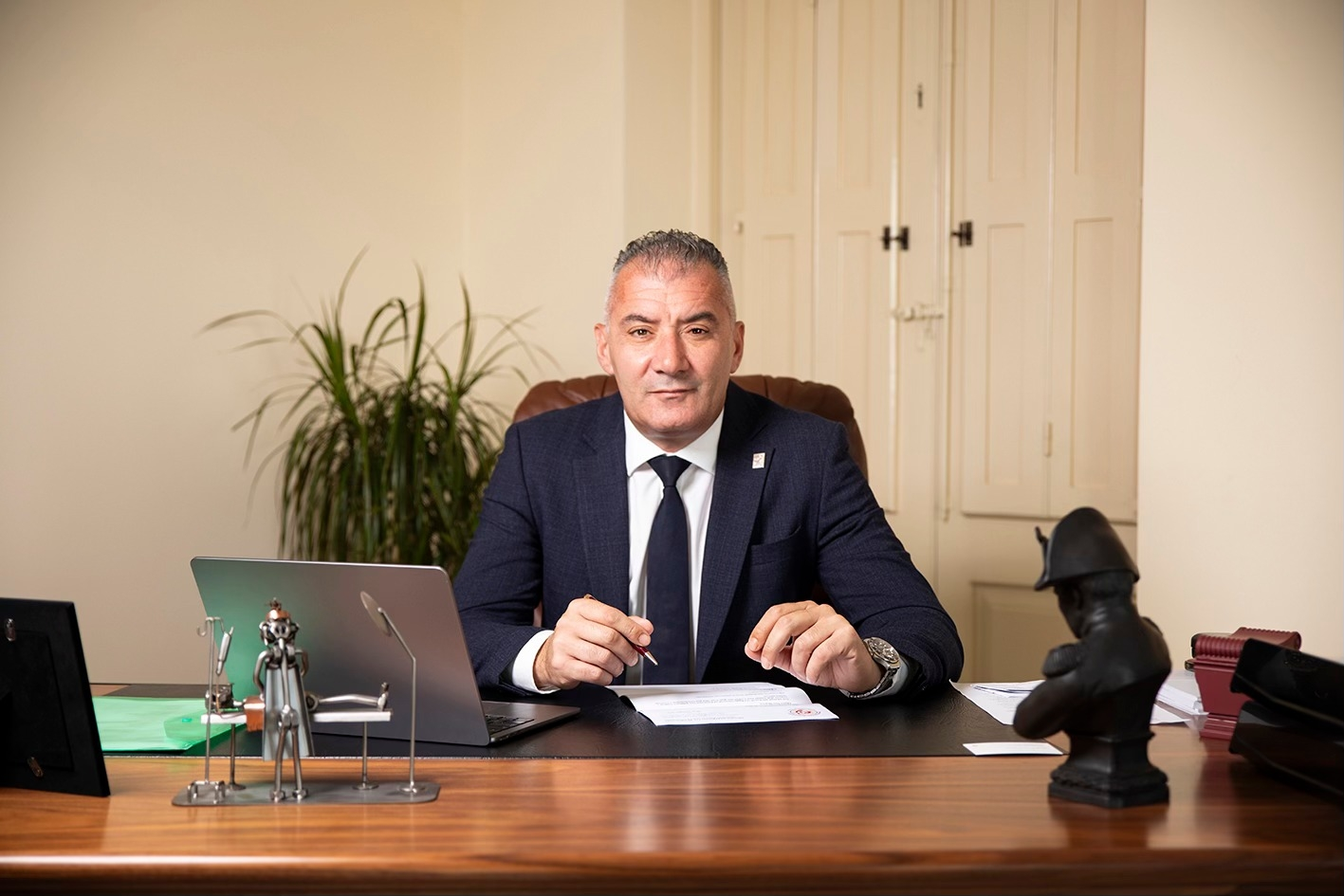
- Abela in 2024

Minister for Tourism
- Incumbent
- Assumed office 4 June 2026
- President: Myriam Spiteri Debono
- Prime Minister: Robert Abela
- Preceded by: Ian Borg

Minister for Health and Active Ageing
- In office 8 January 2024 – 30 May 2026
- President: George Vella; Myriam Spiteri Debono
- Prime Minister: Robert Abela
- Preceded by: Chris Fearne
- Succeeded by: Ian Borg

Minister for Active Ageing
- In office 30 March 2022 – 8 January 2024
- President: George Vella
- Prime Minister: Robert Abela
- Preceded by: Michael Farrugia
- Succeeded by: Malcolm Paul Agius Galea

Personal details
- Born: 29 November 1975 (age 50)
- Party: Partit Laburista
- Children: 3

Jo Etienne Abela is a Maltese doctor and politician from the Labour Party who has served as the Minister for Tourism since June 2026.

== Early life ==
Abela was born in Rabat in Gozo on 29 November 1975. He attended Sir Arturo Mercieca Primary School in Victoria, Ninu Cremona – Junior Lyceum Complex and sixth form Sir Michelangelo Refalo, all in Gozo. He studied medicine and surgery at the University of Malta between 1993 and 1999 where he later worked as a medical doctor at St Luke's Hospital.

He moved to Scotland in 2003 to further his studies. During his stay in Glasgow he became a Consultant of surgery where he was the youngest surgeon in the whole country. He then specialized on the esophagus and the pancreas.

== Career ==
He returned to Malta in 2012 and a year later began working at Mater Dei Hospital, Gozo Hospital and also as a visiting lecturer at the University of Malta.

Professor Etienne Abela has held administrative positions as Deputy Head of the Department of Surgery and Lead Clinician in the High Dependency Unit, endoscopy and pancreatic disease. He also serves as an IST at the Royal College of Surgeons in Edinburgh and is a college and a Union Européenne des Médecins Spécialistes (UEMS) examiner in surgery.

He contested the general election of March 2022 on the 10th and 13th electoral districts and after being elected, was appointed Minister for Active Ageing in the Government led by Prime Minister Robert Abela. After the 2026 Maltese general election, he was appointed Minister of Tourism.

== Personal life ==
He lives in Sliema, is married and has four children.

== See also ==
- List of members of the parliament of Malta, 2022–2027
