= Jonathan Attard =

Minister for Planning, Infrastructure and Employment

The Honourable Jonathan Attard MP
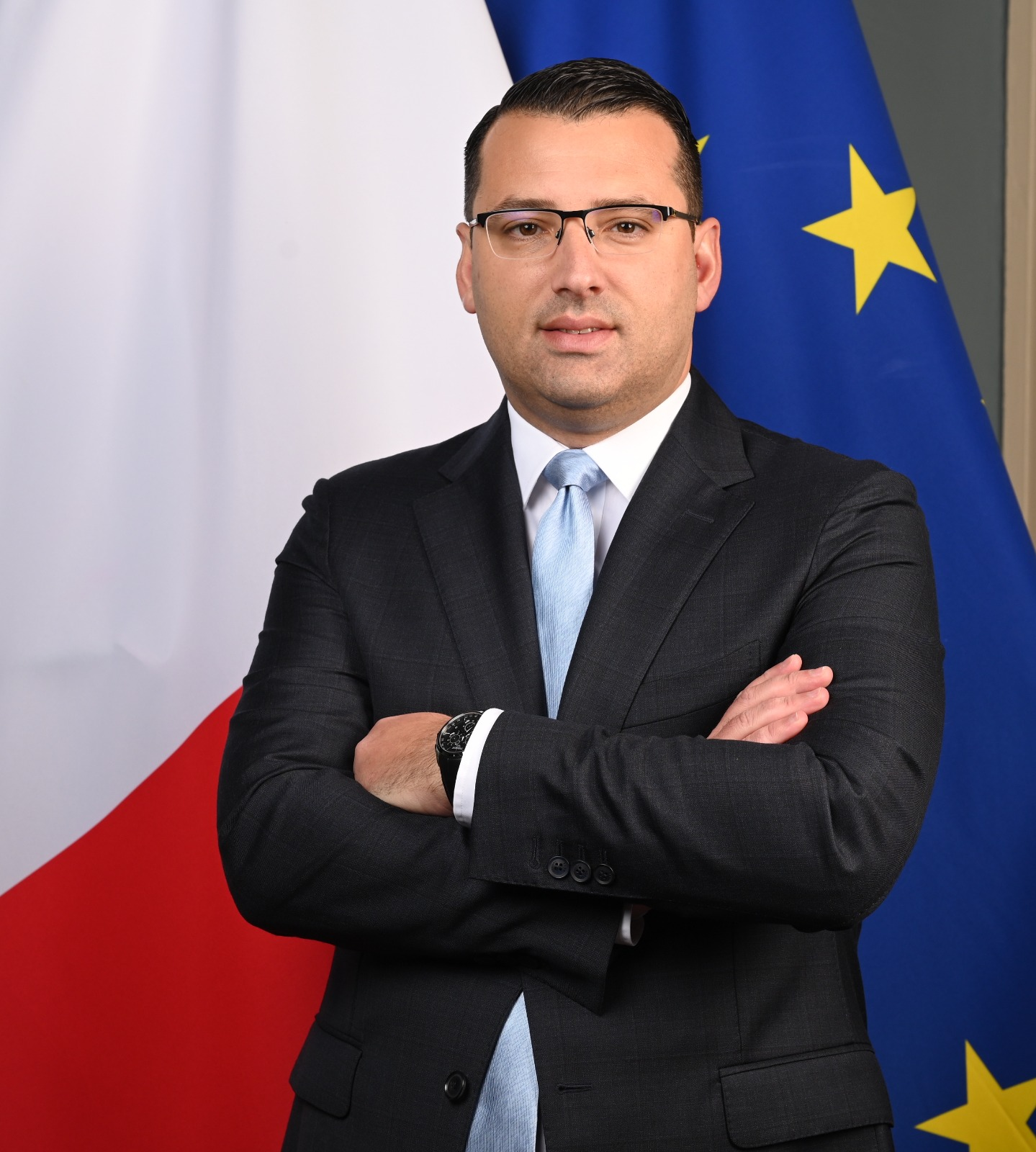
- Official portrait, 2023

Minister for Planning, Infrastructure and Employment
- Incumbent
- Assumed office 4 June 2026
- Prime Minister: Robert Abela

Minister for Justice
- In office 30 March 2022 – 4 June 2026
- Prime Minister: Robert Abela

Member of Parliament
- Incumbent
- Assumed office 14 July 2021

Personal details
- Born: 7 May 1984 (age 42) Tarxien, Malta
- Party: Labour
- Education: University of Malta

Jonathan Attard MP (born 7 May 1984) is a Maltese lawyer and politician. A former journalist, he is currently serving as Malta’s Minister for Planning, Infrastructure and Employment, since June 2026. Before that, Dr Attard held the role of Justice and Reform of the Construction Sector Minister.

== Education ==
Attard earned a Bachelor's degree in Communications and Social Studies in 2004. Subsequently, he then graduated with a Bachelor of Laws degree in 2011, and after that year with a Diploma of Notary Public. Following that, he obtained a Doctor of Laws degree and a year after, in 2015, he was called to the Bar. His research for his doctoral thesis focused on Public Law and examined the topic of "Increased Accountability on Members of Parliament". He obtained all his qualifications from the University of Malta.

== Professional career ==
Before his appointment as a Cabinet Minister, Attard worked as a lawyer in the Maltese Courts of Justice, mainly specializing in legal areas of Civil Law, Public Law, Property Law, Planning Law, and Corporate Law.

Additionally, he held several positions in the public sector prior to his appointment as a minister. He served as the Communications Coordinator for the Ministry for the Economy, Investment and Small Business, and later as a liaison officer between that ministry and Malta Enterprise.

Dr. Attard has been given various responsibilities by the Government of Malta, including overseeing legislative reforms such as the 2018 Constitutional amendments and the introduction of the right to vote for 16-year-olds in National Elections.

On June 5, 2018, he was appointed a member of the Technical Committee for the Advancement of Representative Democracy, advising the office of the Parliamentary Secretary for Reforms, Citizenship and Simplification of Administrative Processes within the Office of the Office of the Prime Minister. He was also given the task of drafting a bill to amend the Constitution of Malta.

== Political Career and Member of the Parliament of Malta ==
Following unanimous support by the Labour Party Parliamentary Group and the National Executive, Jonathan Attard was co-opted in parliament for the first time in July 2021. During his first tenure as a Member of Parliament, between July 2021 and March 2022, Attard was appointed Head of Parliament's Delegation to the Council of Europe, following which he was elected vice-president of the Parliamentary Assembly of the Council of Europe. As a Member of Parliament, Attard was also involved in various parliamentary committees including the Public Accounts Committee. Attard successfully contested the General Election for the first time in March 2022 and was elected to the House of Representatives. In November 2022, he was appointed a member within an action group of Commonwealth Justice Ministers.

== Minister for Justice ==
Following the 2022 General Election, Attard was appointed Minister for Justice by Prime Minister Robert Abela.

During his first 100 days in office, Attard tabled a motion in parliament to introduce the femicide law in Malta. This bill passed all committee stages after it was unanimously approved in parliament.

== Minister for Justice and Reform of the Construction Sector ==
In January 2024, Minister Attard was entrusted with the responsibility of overseeing the Reform of the Construction Sector alongside his role as minister for justice.

Upon being entrusted with spearheading the reform efforts in the construction sector in January 2024, Attard prioritised the introduction of a new Health and Safety law to the Maltese Parliament. The existing legislation, which had been in place for over 20 years, had been a subject of lengthy discussions due to the need for change. In the first six months of his appointment, Attard coordinated the finalisation and delivery of the long-awaited Health and Safety bill. Recognising the necessity for a significant update, he ensured that the new law was approved, unanimously, by the Parliament of Malta in July 2024.

On 24 January 2025, Yorgen Fenech, one of the alleged masterminds accused of orchestrating the murder of journalist Daphne Caruana Galizia was granted bail. This decision created much controversy, with one of Caruana Galiza's sons blaming Prime Minister Robert Abela, and the Minister of Justice Jonathan Attard, for failing to reform the justice system, and accusing them to be on the side of criminals. A few days later on 30 January 2025, Jonathan Attard was heavily criticised by the Institute of Maltese Journalists and blogger Mark Camilleri, for voting against the amendments proposed by the opposition with regards to anti-SLAPP laws which seek to protect journalists, media outlets, blogs and other publications from aggravating costly lawsuits intended to frighten reporters into silence.

On 30 September 2025, Attard was accused by the opposition and an NGO of attacking the judiciary, after he said that he expected the committee responsible for appointing judges to steer away from “controversial” candidates. This was interpreted as a thinly veiled reference to criticism levelled at Magistrate Gabriella Vella for her work on the Vitals inquiry, where she had concluded that there was enough evidence for former Prime Minister Joseph Muscat and other former labour ministers to face corruption charges.

During his tenure as Justice Minister, Dr Attard spearheaded several reforms, most notably the family court reform, which was approved by Parliament in March 2026.

== Minister for Planning, Infrastructure and Employment ==
In the 2026 General Election, Dr Attard once again contested the 4th and 12th electoral districts and was elected from both, obtaining a total of 5,942 first-preference votes on both districts. Subsequently, Prime Minister Robert Abela appointed Dr Attard as the new Minister for Planning, Infrastructure and Employment.
