= Julia Farrugia Portelli =

Maltese politician

Honourable Julia Farrugia Portelli MP
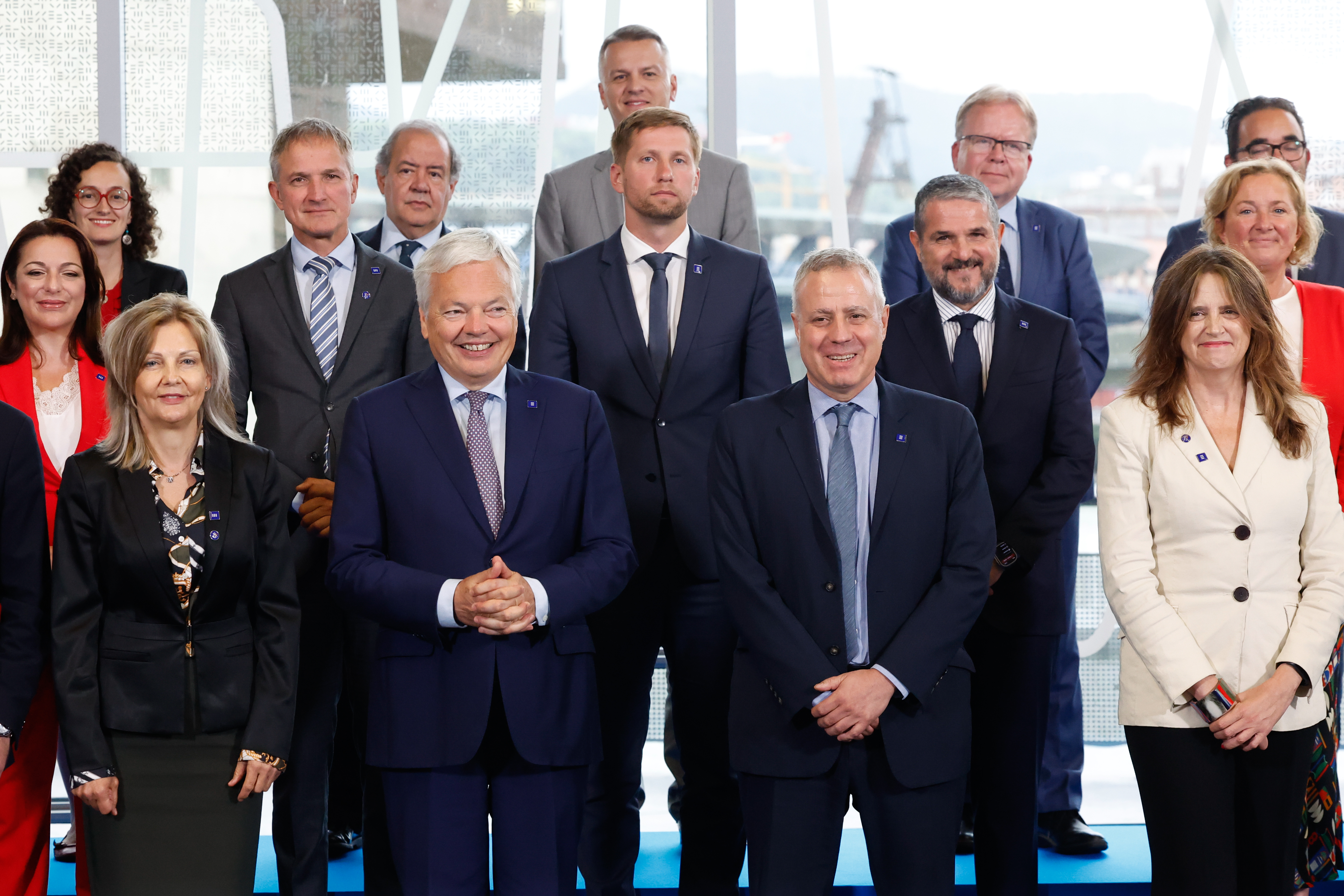
- Farrugia Portelli on the Left hand side wearing a red suite during a Competitiveness Ministers meeting

Minister for Inclusion and the Voluntary Sector
- Incumbent
- Assumed office 6 January 2024
- Prime Minister: Robert Abela
- Preceded by: Herself (as Minister for Inclusion, Voluntary Organisations and Consumer Rights)

Minister for Inclusion, Voluntary Organisations and Consumer Rights
- In office 30 March 2022 – 6 January 2024
- Prime Minister: Robert Abela
- Preceded by: Office established
- Succeeded by: Herself (as Minister for Inclusion and the Voluntary Sector)

Minister for Inclusion, Social Wellbeing and Voluntary Organisations
- In office 29 December 2021 – 20 February 2022
- Prime Minister: Robert Abela
- Preceded by: Herself (as Minister for Inclusion and Social Wellbeing)
- Succeeded by: Office dissolved (Parliament dissolved)

Minister for Inclusion and Social Wellbeing
- In office 23 November 2020 – 29 December 2021
- Prime Minister: Robert Abela
- Preceded by: Office established
- Succeeded by: Herself (as Minister for Inclusion, Social Wellbeing and Voluntary Organisations)

Minister for Tourism and Consumer Protection
- In office 20 January 2020 – 23 November 2020
- Prime Minister: Robert Abela
- Preceded by: Office established
- Succeeded by: Clayton Bartolo

Minister for Tourism
- In office 15 January 2020 – 19 January 2020
- Prime Minister: Robert Abela
- Preceded by: Konrad Mizzi
- Succeeded by: Herself (as Minister for Tourism and Consumer Protection)

Parliamentary Secretary for Reforms, Citizenship and Simplification of Administrative Processes
- In office 9 June 2017 – 15 January 2020
- Prime Minister: Joseph Muscat
- Succeeded by: Alex Muscat (politician)

Member of the Parliament of Malta
- Incumbent
- Assumed office 3 June 2017

Personal details
- Born: Julia Farrugia Portelli
- Party: Labour Party (Malta)
- Occupation: Politician

Julia Farrugia is a Maltese politician, currently serving as Minister for Inclusion and Social Wellbeing since 2022.

== Career ==
She was elected from the 5th district at the 2017 general election on the Labour Party ticket, and served as Parliamentary Secretary for Reforms, Citizenship and Simplification of Administrative Processes at the Office of the Prime Minister between 9 June 2017 and 13 January 2020. As Parliamentary Secretary she was involved with reforms including: Human Trafficking, Constitutional Reform and Equal Representation in Parliament.

In 2018, Farrugia Portelli was awarded the ‘Impactful Politics’ Awards from JCI Malta. She has successfully implemented the VOTE16 reform, where Malta is now one of two European Union Member states that have lowered their voting age to 16. With the election of Robert Abela as Prime Minister of Malta, Farrugia Portelli was appointed Minister for Tourism and Consumer Protection on 15 January 2020. Farrugia Portelli is a former journalist and anchor of a number of current affairs and investigative journalism programmes. She was also the first female editor of a Maltese newspaper.

== Breach of Standards in Public Life ==
In 2020, The Commissioner for Standards in Public Life found that Farrugia Portelli may have given an improper advantage to a private firm selling citizenship by investment schemes. Minister Farrugia Portelli, who at the time was a Parliamentary Secretary with responsibility for these schemes, appeared in all three videos together with officials from the government agencies that administer the schemes and representatives of the law firm itself. All three videos were shot in Castille. The Commissioner held that “there is a fine line between promoting a Government scheme and giving preferential treatment to a particular agent. In my opinion, this line has been crossed in the case under consideration.”
