= Alex Agius Saliba =

Maltese politician & Vice President of the S&D since 2021

MEP Alex Agius Saliba
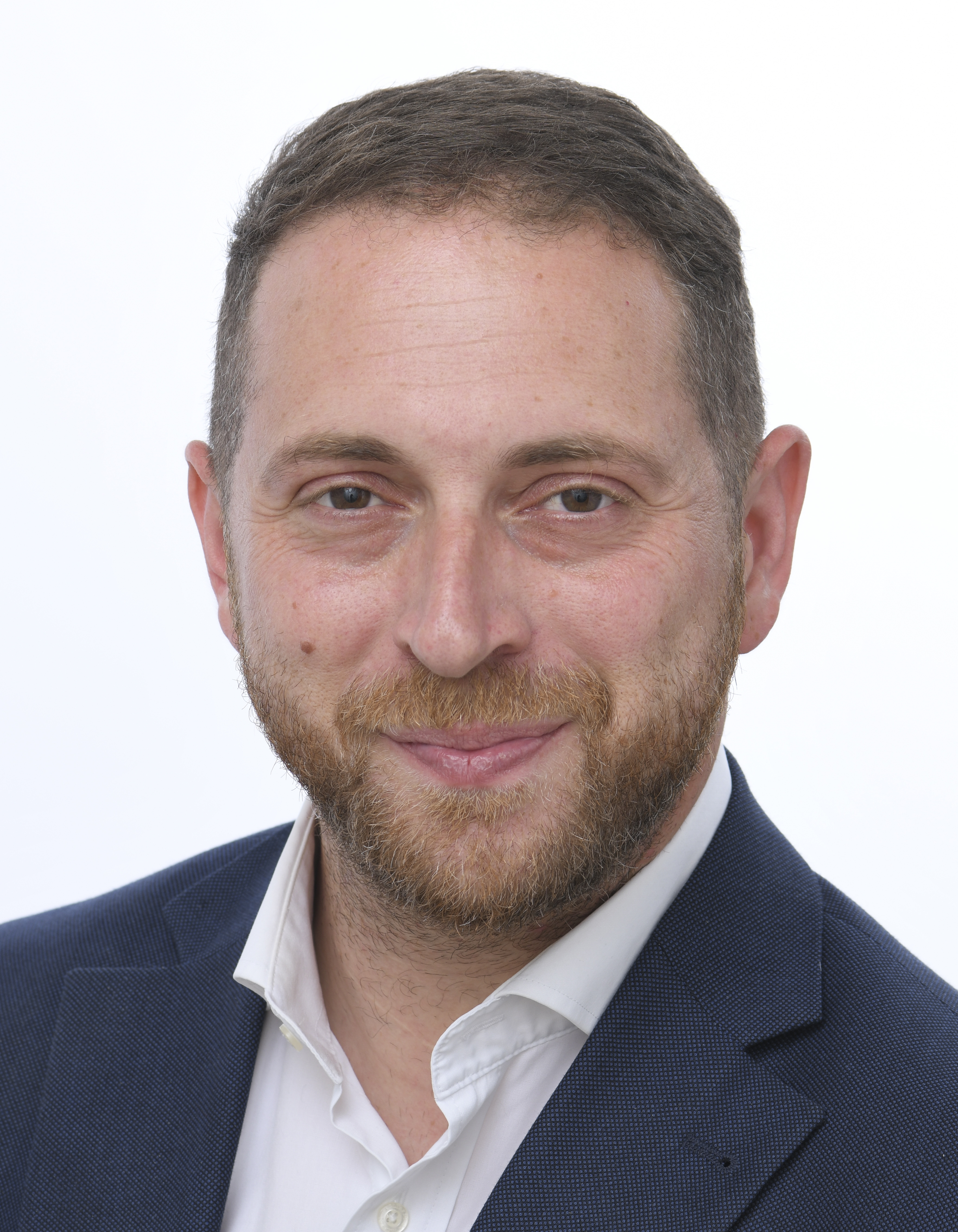

Member of the European Parliament for Malta
- Incumbent
- Assumed office 1 July 2019

Deputy Leader for Party Affairs for the Partit Laburista
- Incumbent
- Assumed office 14 September 2024
- Leader: Robert Abela

Vice President of the Progressive Alliance of Socialists and Democrats (S&D) Group in the European Parliament
- Incumbent
- Assumed office 15 December 2021
- Leader: Iratxe García

Personal details
- Born: 31 January 1988 (age 38) Pietà, Malta
- Party: Labour Party (national); Socialists & Democrats (European)
- Children: 1
- Education: University of Malta
- Profession: Lawyer
- Website: www.alexagiussaliba.com

Alex Agius Saliba (born 31 January 1988) is a Maltese politician, Member of the European Parliament since 2019 for the Labour Party.

== Biography ==
Born Alex Saliba, he studied at Tarxien primary school and at St. Augustine's College.

At 17 years, he joined the Labour students' organisation Pulse, and later the Labour Party youth branch, Forum Żgħażagħ Laburisti, both of which he presided till 2017.

Saliba worked as a journalist for One Productions (the Labour party media house) from 2008 till 2013. After graduating as lawyer, in 2013-2017 he advised several Labour ministers, including Helena Dalli and Ian Borg, and Parliamentary Secretary Stefan Buontempo. In 2017-2018 he headed the EU Secretariat.

For 10 years, Saliba was also a member of the Labour Party's National Executive – a post to which he was elected with the largest number of votes from delegates in 2018. The same year, he was offered by Prime Minister Joseph Muscat to contest the 2019 European Parliament election in Malta.

He then added his wife's maiden name, Agius, ahead of his own, Saliba, to be on top of the ballot box, in alphabetical order. “Donkey voting gives candidates whose surnames start with A, B, C or D an extra push and I’d be lying if I said I didn’t take this into consideration,” he had said.

With 35,823 votes of preference, in May 2019 Agius Saliba was elected at the European Parliament. He served as rapporteur of the Digital Services Act, a role for which Politico Europe listed him as one of the 20 MEPs to watch during 2020. In December 2021 he was elected as one of the nine vice-presidents of the S&D group.

In March 2024, Saliba was one of twenty MEPs to be given a "Rising Star" award at The Parliament Magazine's annual MEP Awards.

== Personal life ==
In 2018, Saliba married Sarah Agius, former mayor of Żebbuġ. In 2023, they became parents to a baby girl. In 2024, it was reported that the couple had separated.
