= Government of Malta =

Executive branch of Malta

Government of Malta Gvern ta’ Malta
- Unitary parliamentary republic
- Coat of arms of Malta
- Formation: 21 July 1964; 61 years ago
- Country: Malta
- Website: www.gov.mt

Executive branch
- President of Malta: Myriam Spiteri Debono
- Prime Minister of Malta: Robert Abela
- Speaker: Carmelo Abela
- Appointed by: President of Malta
- Main organ: Cabinet of Malta

The Government of Malta (Maltese: Gvern ta' Malta) is the executive branch of the Republic of Malta. It is made up of the Cabinet and the Parliamentary Secretaries. The Prime Minister is appointed by the President of Malta, with the President making their decision based on the situation within the Maltese parliament. The Prime Minister is responsible for assigning departments of government to Permanent Secretaries. The President of Malta also appoints the rest of the cabinet with the assent of the Prime Minister of Malta.

== Current Government ==
- Maltese Government 2026–2031

== See also ==
- Cabinet of Malta
- List of Maltese governments
- Maltese Government 2026–2031
