= Silvio Schembri =

Maltese politician (born 1985)

The Honourable Silvio Schembri MP
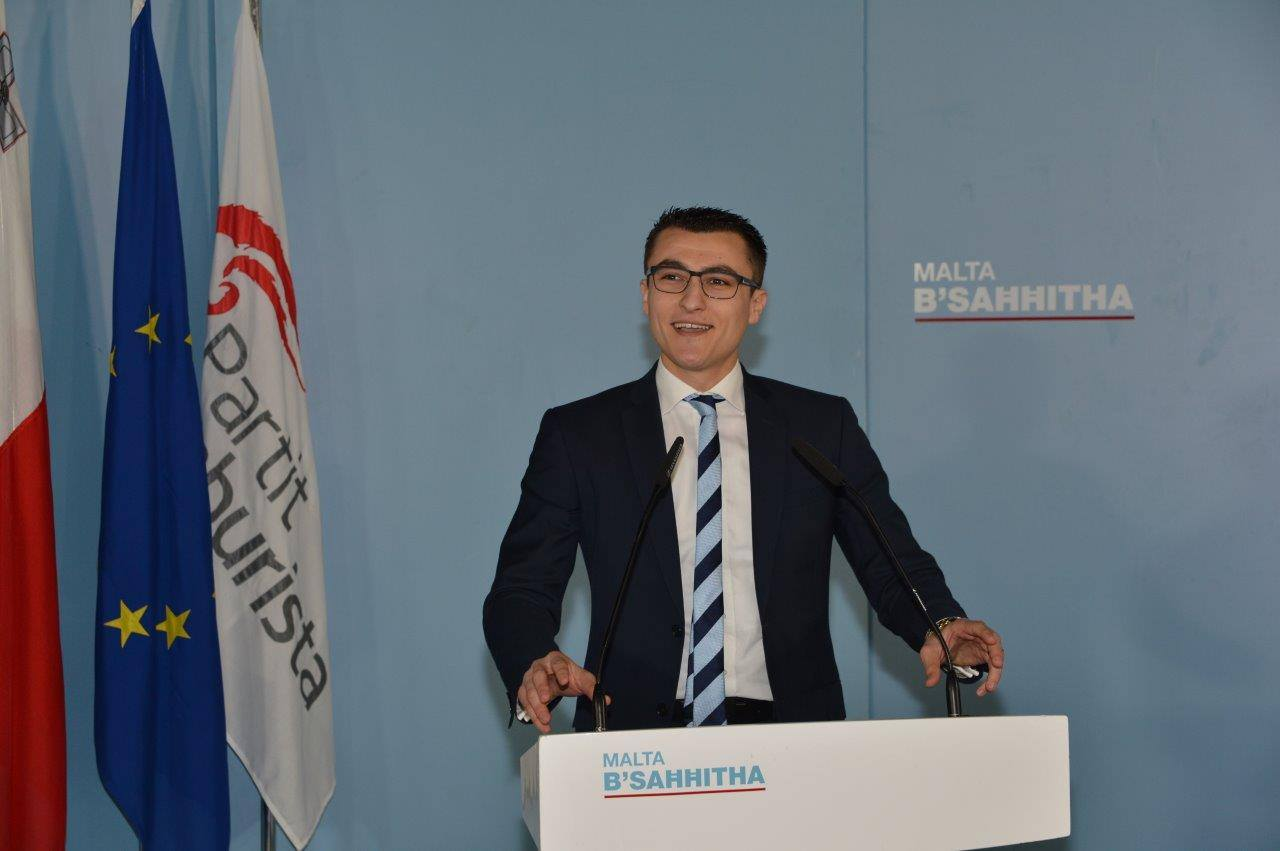
- Schembri in 2016

Minister for the Economy, Technology and Strategic Projects
- Incumbent
- Assumed office 15 January 2020
- Prime Minister: Robert Abela
- Preceded by: Chris Cardona

Member of Parliament
- Incumbent
- Assumed office March 2013

Personal details
- Born: 21 May 1985 (age 41) Luqa, Malta
- Party: Labour Party
- Education: University of Malta
- Website: silvioschembri.com

Silvio Schembri (born 21 May 1985) is a Maltese politician and academic currently serving as the Minister for the Economy, Technology and Strategic Projects.

Previously, Hon. Schembri was the Minister responsible for the Economy, EU Funds and Lands, the Minister for the Economy and Industry, and also had served as Parliamentary Secretary for Financial Services, Digital Economy and Innovation.

== Education ==
Hon. Schembri attained a master's degree in Economy right after graduating with a Bachelors of Honours in Economics from the University of Malta.

== Professional career ==
Hon. Schembri started off his career by working in a private bank, and was later tasked with the role of Supervisor Economist within the Central Bank of Malta. Hon. Schembri had also served as the chairperson of the Responsible Gaming Foundation Malta on a voluntary basis, set up with the aim of helping, educating and preventing problems in relation to gambling.

As a Member of Parliament, Hon. Schembri also chaired the parliamentary committee for economic and financial affairs and worked as an advisor for the then Economy Affairs Ministry.

Hon. Schembri was also founding member and general manager of the Gal Xlokk foundation.

During his tenure as Parliamentary Secretary for Financial Services, Digital Economy and Innovation, Hon. Schembri was behind Malta's first Artificial Intelligence Strategy as well as the launch of the AI Certification Programme. Hon. Schembri is also pushing to see that the Esports and Videogame Development sectors continue to grow. Hon. Schembri played a vital role in seeing that Malta was the first jurisdiction to establish a legal regulatory framework for blockchain services.

During the pandemic, Hon. Schembri played a central role in the Covid-19 economic regeneration plan which consisted of several aid packages to support individuals and businesses.

== 2013 Election ==
Schembri was elected to Parliament after obtaining 2,823 first count votes from the sixth district in the 2013 Maltese general election.

== 2017 Election ==
Schembri was elected to Parliament for a second time from both the 6th and 7th districts after obtaining 3,950 and 1,184 first count votes respectively.

== 2022 Election ==
Schembri was elected to Parliament once again, garnering a total of 6,776 first count votes from both the 6th and 7th districts. The election was held on March 26 and Schembri was among the candidates who garnered most votes.
