= Clayton Bartolo =

Maltese politician (born 1987)

The Honourable Clayton Bartolo
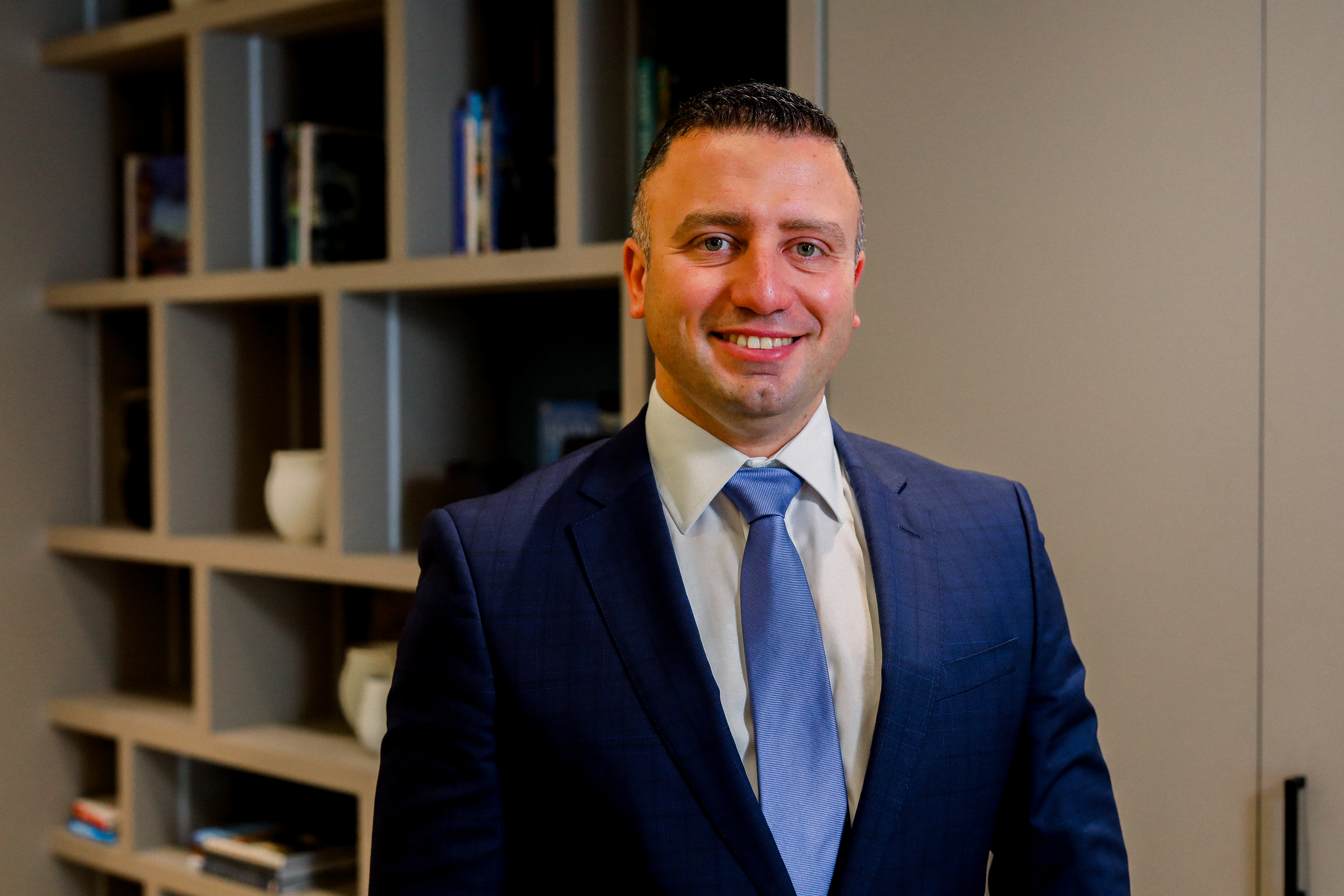
- Bartolo in 2022

Member of the Maltese Parliament
- In office 20 June 2017 – 27 April 2026
- Prime Minister: Joseph Muscat (2013-2020); Robert Abela (2020-current)

Parliamentary Secretary for Financial Services and Digital Economy
- In office 15 January 2020 – 23 November 2020
- Prime Minister: Robert Abela

Minister for Tourism and Consumer Protection
- In office 23 November 2020 – 20 February 2022
- Prime Minister: Robert Abela

Minister for Tourism
- In office 30 March 2022 – 06 January 2024
- Prime Minister: Robert Abela

Minister for Tourism and Public Cleanliness
- In office 06 January 2024 – 26 November 2024 (Forced to resign by the Prime Minister)
- Prime Minister: Robert Abela

Personal details
- Born: 2 June 1987 (age 39) Tal-Pietà, Republic of Malta
- Party: Independent (since 2024)
- Other political affiliations: Labour Party (until 2024); Socialists & Democrats (European affiliation)
- Spouse: Amanda Muscat (m. 2024)
- Education: University of Malta

Clayton Bartolo (born 2 June 1987) is a Maltese politician, accountant and registered auditor. He was member of the Labour Party and former Minister for Tourism. He first entered politics as a councillor and later deputy mayor of the local council of Mellieħa. He was elected as a Labour member of the Parliament of Malta in June 2017.

Despite his success in achieving a record of tourist arrivals in Malta after the worst days of the COVID-19 pandemic, in November 2024 he was forced to resign as Minister for Tourism and as a Labour MP after a scandal broke out involving the promotion of his then-girlfriend and personal secretary Amanda Muscat to a consultancy role and allowing her to receive a salary without fulfilling her duties for 13 months. His lavish spending was also put into question.

== Scandals and resignation ==
An investigation by Standards Commissioner Joseph Azzopardi found that Bartolo, together with fellow Minister Clint Camilleri, breached the ministerial code of ethics through a consultancy contract they gave Amanda Muscat, at the time, Bartolo’s girlfriend and personal secretary.

Commissioner Azzopardi found that following the start of the extramarital relationship between Bartolo and Amanda Muscat in 2020 – then his private secretary – the latter was promoted to a much higher grade as policy consultant, a position for which she was not qualified for. It was found that despite her supposed move to the Gozo ministry, Muscat never worked at Clint Camilleri’s Ministry and never wrote a single consultancy report for which she was supposedly hired. Instead, the Commissioner found that Muscat continued to work at Clayton Bartolo’s ministry as his private secretary but received her salary from the Gozo ministry.

Bartolo, considered a close ally of Prime Minister Robert Abela, initially refused to resign. Prime Minister Abela, having personally terminated Muscat's contract in 2021, initially insinuated that he wouldn't ask for Bartolo's resignation, instead deferring the decision to the bi-partisan parliamentary standards committee. Nevertheless, after a second scandal emerged where Muscat was alleged to have received a €50,000 kickback for a Malta Tourism Authority deal, Prime Minister Robert Abela forced Clayton Bartolo to resign on 26 November 2024. Furthermore, Abela expelled Bartolo from the Labour parliamentary group.

== Personal life ==
Bartolo has been married to Amanda Muscat since 28 June 2024.
