= Omar Farrugia =

Maltese politician (born 1995)

Honorable Omar Farrugia MP
- Farrugia in 2026

Minister for Youth, Wellbeing and the Implementation of the Electoral Programme
- Incumbent
- Assumed office 4 June 2026

Member of Parliament
- Incumbent
- Assumed office 7 April 2022
- Constituency: Fifth District

Parliamentary Secretary for Public Works
- In office 6 January 2024 – 4 June 2026

Personal details
- Born: 28 December 1995 (age 30)

Omar Farrugia (born 28 December 1995) is a Maltese politician from the Labour Party who is part of the Fourteenth Legislature of Malta.

== Career ==
Farrugia was the mayor of Mqabba from 2019 to 2022. He was then elected in the 2022 election and currently serves District 5.

Farrugia is a former footballer, who represented Mqabba FC and Santa Lucia during his career.
