= Stefan Zrinzo Azzopardi =

Maltese politician

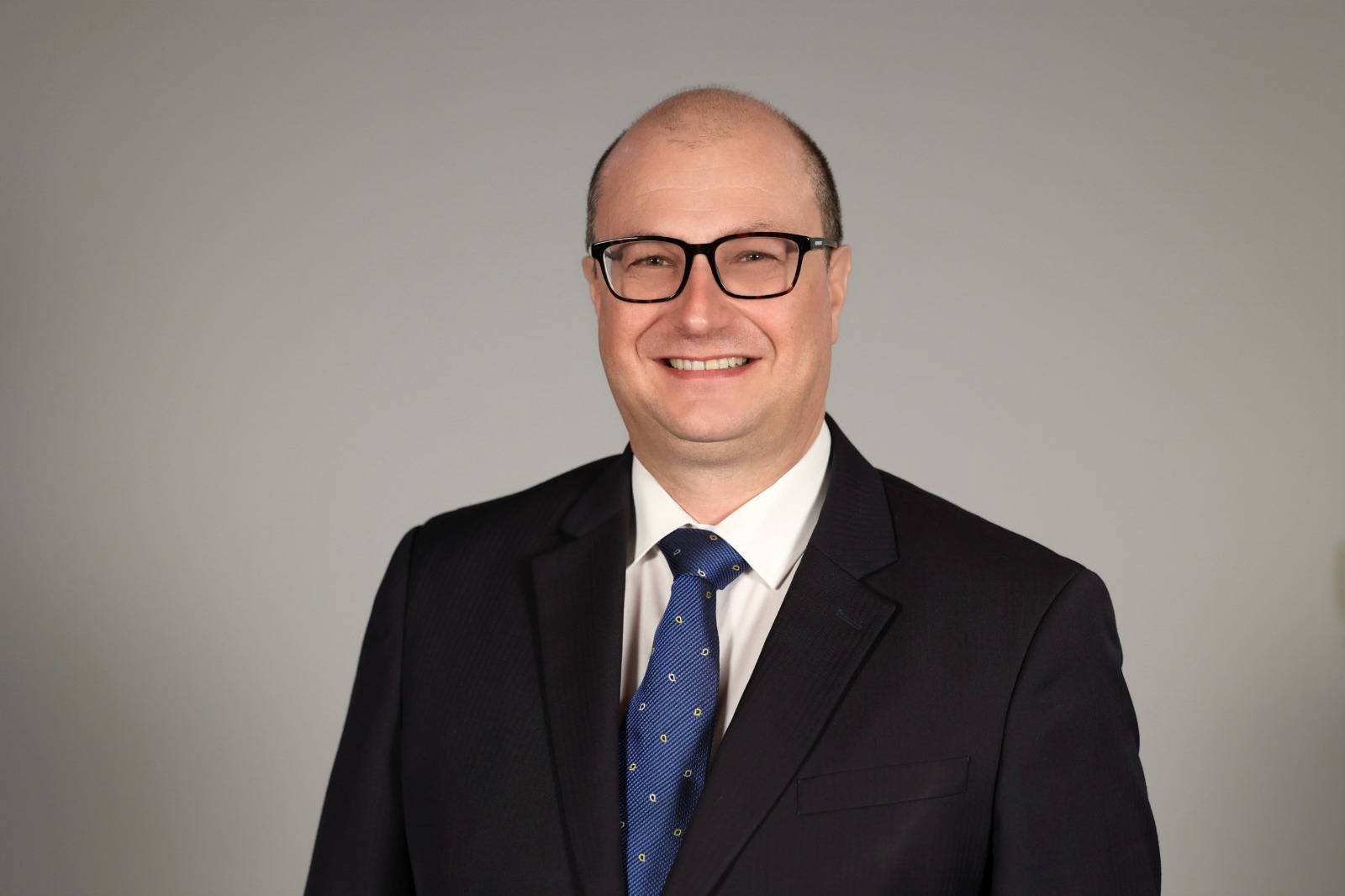
Zrinzo Azzopardi in 2025

Stefan Zrinzo Azzopardi (born 23 September 1973) is a lawyer and a former Maltese politician. He served as Minister for European Funds and the Implementation of the Electoral Programme in Robert Abela’s cabinet until May 2026. He was first elected Member of Parliament for the 5th Electoral District (Birżebbuġa, Ħal Farruġ, Ħal Kirkop, Ħal Safi, Mqabba, Qrendi, Żurrieq) in 2017.

== Career ==
Zrinzo Azzopardi is a lawyer, and practiced mainly in commercial and civil law since 2000. In May 2013, he was appointed Chairman of the Grand Harbour Regeneration Corporation, a position he held until January 2020. During his tenure, the Corporation was responsible for the completion of several projects designed by Architect Renzo Piano, including the new Parliament Building, the Capital City of Valletta’s entrance, and later Castille Square. The same Corporation oversaw an EU funded regeneration project in lower Valletta.

== Politics ==
Zrinzo Azzopardi is a Partit Laburista member. He was active in politics since 1996, within the local community and the party. In 2003 he was elected as president of the then Labour Party, and during his tenure, he oversaw various structural reforms, including the introduction of a statute in 2008 that revitalized and modernized the political party.

In June 2017, Zrinzo Azzopardi was elected as a Member of Parliament for the 5th Electoral District. He served as chairman on the Adjunct Consideration of Bills Committee, and as a member of the Economic and Financial Affairs Committee, the Foreign and European Affairs Committee, and the National Audit Office Accounts Committee. He also used to form part of Malta’s Parliamentary Delegation to the Council of Europe Parliamentary Assembly and the OSCE Parliamentary Assembly.

In January 2020, the newly appointed Prime Minister of Malta, Robert Abela appointed Zrinzo Azzopardi as the Parliamentary Secretary responsible for European Funds, a Secretariat which later formed part of the Office of the Prime Minister^{.} During his tenure at this Secretariat, Zrinzo Azzopardi attended EU formal and informal General Affairs Council meetings and participated in negotiations leading to the successful conclusion of Malta’s EU Recovery and Resilience Plan within the EU’s 2021-2027 budget framework which saw Malta being allocated a record €2.2 billion of European Union funds. Zrinzo Azzopardi also oversaw the successful conclusion of various EU Funded projects under the 2014-2020 budget.

After his successful re-election to Parliament in the March 2022 General Election, Zrinzo Azzopardi was appointed as Minister for Public Works and Planning. He continued to hold this position until January 2024 when he was appointed as Minister for Lands and the Implementation of the Electoral Programme.

As Minister for Public Works and Planning, Zrinzo Azzopardi held wide consultations on reforming the construction sector leading to the introduction of the first ever legislation on the licensing of construction contractors in Malta and Gozo. The reforms included also more powers to the Building & Constructions Authority with particular emphasis on the protection of third parties in construction sites. Following stakeholders consultations, Zrinzo Azzopardi also launched a White Paper on reforming the Occupational Health & Safety Authority (OHSA) following which a draft law was moved to Parliament and eventually approved. Zrinzo Azzopardi was also responsible for preparing legislation to update the Condominium Act and the creation of the Agency responsible for the registration of Property Agents. As Minister also responsible for Planning, Zrinzo Azzopardi oversaw the final stages of the compilation of the SPED Report.

In January 2024, Dr Zrinzo Azzopardi was appointed Minister for Lands and the Implementation of the Electoral Programme. In this role, he oversaw three major entities: the Lands Authority, the Land Registry, and the Joint Office. He introduced schemes that facilitated the transfer of public land to local councils and NGOs. He also initiated a national reform in the field of land registration that will lead to the entire Maltese and Gozitan territory being a compulsory registration area by 2035.

Since May 2025, Dr Stefan Zrinzo Azzopardi has been appointed Minister for European Funds and the Implementation of the Electoral Programme, where he has been re-assigned by Prime Minister Robert Abela to lead the portfolio of European funds for Malta. In this position, he also continues to lead the coordination and implementation of the electoral programme, to ensure that the proposals are effectively implemented in accordance with the Government’s vision.

Prior to the May 2026 General Election, Dr Zrinzo Azzopardi announced that he would not be contesting the election and would return to his legal profession following the election.

== Personal life ==
Stefan Zrinzo Azzopardi is married to Silvana, with whom he has two children.
