= Miriam Dalli =

Vice President of the Socialists & Democrats

MP Miriam Dalli
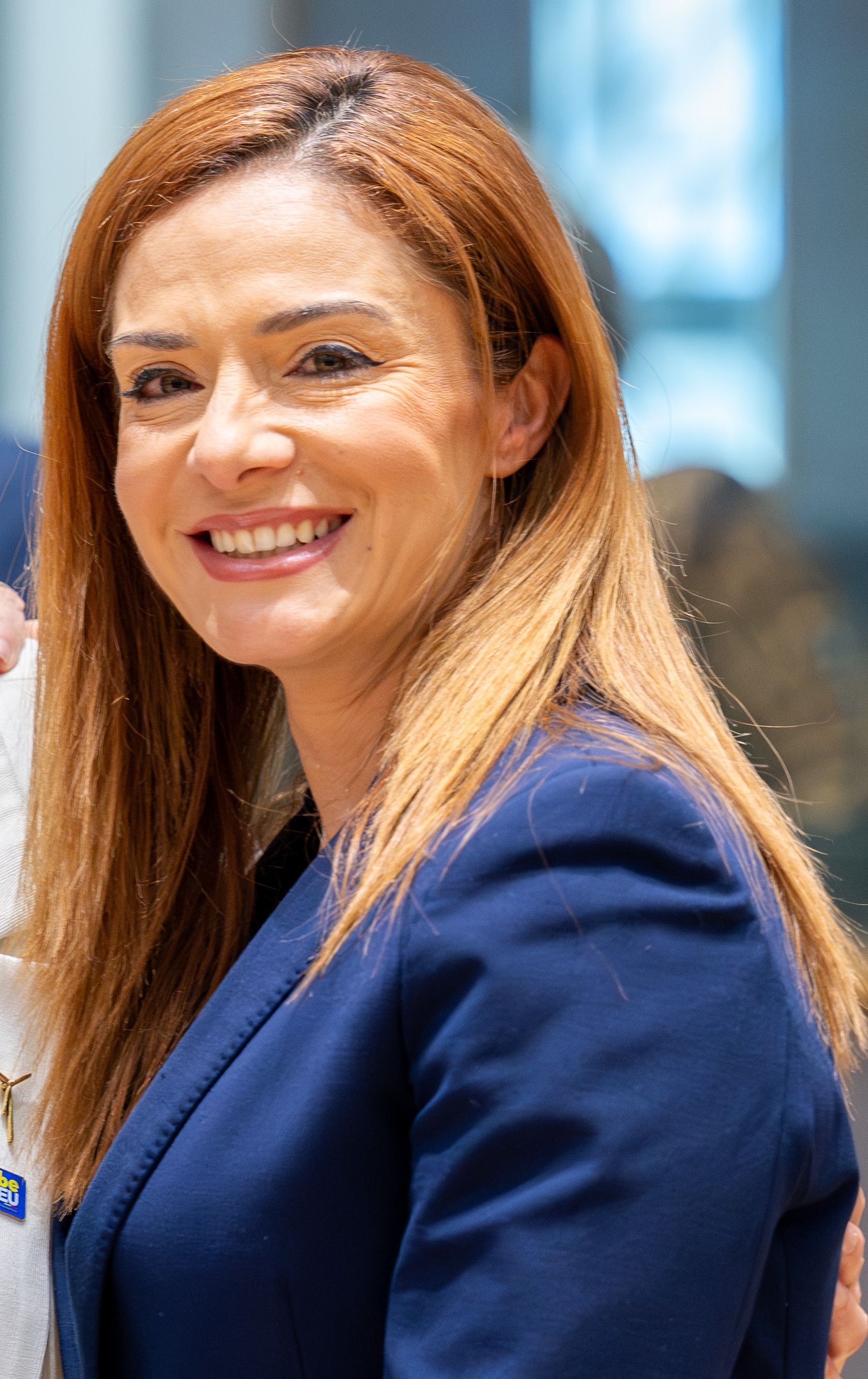
- Dalli in 2024

Minister for Energy, the Environment and the Regeneration of the Grand Harbour
- Incumbent
- Assumed office 04 June 2026
- Prime Minister: Robert Abela

Minister for the Environment, Energy and Public Cleanliness
- In office 28 November 2024 – 30 May 2026
- Prime Minister: Robert Abela

Minister for the Environment, Energy and Enterprise
- In office 30 March 2022 – 28 November 2024
- Prime Minister: Robert Abela

Minister for Energy, Enterprise and Sustainable Development
- In office 21 November 2020 – 26 March 2022
- Prime Minister: Robert Abela

Member of the Maltese Parliament
- Incumbent
- Assumed office 19 October 2020

Member of the European Parliament for Malta
- In office 1 July 2014 – 18 October 2020
- Prime Minister: Joseph Muscat; Robert Abela

Personal details
- Born: 19 May 1976 (age 50) St. Julian's, Malta
- Party: Labour Party (Malta) (national); Socialists & Democrats (European)
- Children: 2
- Education: University of Malta
- Website: miriamdalli.com/meet-miriam/

Miriam Dalli (born 19 May 1976) is a Maltese politician of the Labour Party and former journalist who has been serving as a member of the Parliament of Malta since 2020. She was previously a Member of the European Parliament (MEP) from 2014 until 2020. She is married has two sons.

== Education ==
Dalli completed a first degree as Bachelor of Laws at the University of Malta. She later graduated with a second degree with a Bachelor in Communications (1998), completed her master's in European Studies (2003), and in Business Administration (2001).

== Career in journalism ==
Dalli started her career in journalism, during her studies, working for over 15 years in communications sector. She produced and presented current-affairs programmes, such as TRIP, TEAM and TX. In 2007, she was acknowledged as the best news presenter, best programme presenter, and for the best current-affairs programme during a Maltese national awarding ceremony.

Between 2005 and 2009, Dalli served as a news editor for ONE TV and ONE Radio, becoming the first Maltese female TV news editor.

== Government advisor ==
Dalli was politically appointed as an advisor within the Ministry of Energy and Conservation of Water, when she was responsible for the Communications, Corporate Social Responsibility and Stakeholder Management.

== Political career ==
=== Member of the European Parliament, 2014–2020 ===
In her first political stint, Dalli successfully contested the 2014 European Elections in Malta.

She campaigned on the mantra of 'Priorita Malta' (Priority Malta), underlining her commitment to focus on issues of paramount importance for the country such as job opportunities, irregular immigration, affordable energy, EU funding, youths and cutting red tape for businesses. Her candidature was approved by Malta's Prime Minister Joseph Muscat, saying the Labour Party needed dedicated MEPs.

In the EU election, Dalli garnered around 23,500 first preference votes, making her the third candidate most votes Most preferred candidates from six eligible seats. She became the first Labour female MEP to be elected directly to the European Parliament, after the preceding year saw three female MEPs becoming elected only through a bi-election. In her first comments to the TVM, she thanked the electorate for the responsibilities given and promised to work hard for the needs of Maltese people.

In parliament, Dalli sat as a member on the Committee on the Environment, Public Health and Food Safety (ENVI) and the Committee on Petitions (PETI). Dalli was chosen to serve on the Committee of Inquiry into Emission Measurements in the Automative Sector, after the Volkswagen emissions scandal was revealed. In 2020, she joined the Special Committee on Beating Cancer. In addition to her committee assignments, she was part of the parliament's delegation for relations with the Maghreb countries and the Arab Maghreb Union.

Dalli was also a substitute member on the Committee on Industry, Research and Energy (ITRE), the Committee on Civil Liberties, Justice and Home Affairs (LIBE), and Delegation to the EU-Armenia, EU-Azerbaijan and EU-Georgia Parliamentary Cooperation.

In October 2016 Dalli was chosen as the Coordinator on the ENVI committee, on behalf of the Socialists and Democrats in the European Parliament, replacing German MEP Matthias Groote. She was re-elected in January 2017. This led the VoteWatch.eu to consider Dalli as one of the winners in the European Parliament's mid-term reshuffle, adding that she shown capabilities to negotiate between the two major parties in the European Parliament. She represented the European Parliament in the Climate Change Conference (COP21) held in Paris in December 2015.

Following the 2019 elections, Dalli was elected vice-chair of the S&D Group, under the leadership of chairwoman Iratxe García.

=== Member of the Parliament of Malta, 2020–present ===
In October 2020, Dalli was sworn in the Parliament of Malta, succeeding Etienne Grech. In November 2020, Dalli was appointed Minister for Energy, Enterprise and Sustainable Development. After the 2022 general elections, Dalli was appointed Minister for the Environment, Energy and Enterprise.

== Other activities ==
- Friends of Europe, Member of the Board of Trustees (since 2020)

== Recognition ==
In 2015. Dalli was named as one of the best five new MEPs by The Parliament Magazine. In March 2016, she was chosen as the 'MEP of the Year' in the Energy sector.

In 2017, Dalli was nominated in two different categories in the MEP Awards: Public Health and Environment. She won the Public Health award, which acknowledged her work on issues such as mental health, autism, and cancer in children.

In March 2017, Dalli ranked as the second most influential MEPs in terms of environmental policy by VoteWatch Europe. Together with MEPs Gerben-Jan Gerbrandy and Bas Eickhout, Dalli was viewed as leading environmental policies for progress in the EU.
