= 2022 Maltese general election =

- 26 March 2022

All seats in the House of Representatives
- Turnout: 85.63% (▼6.43pp)
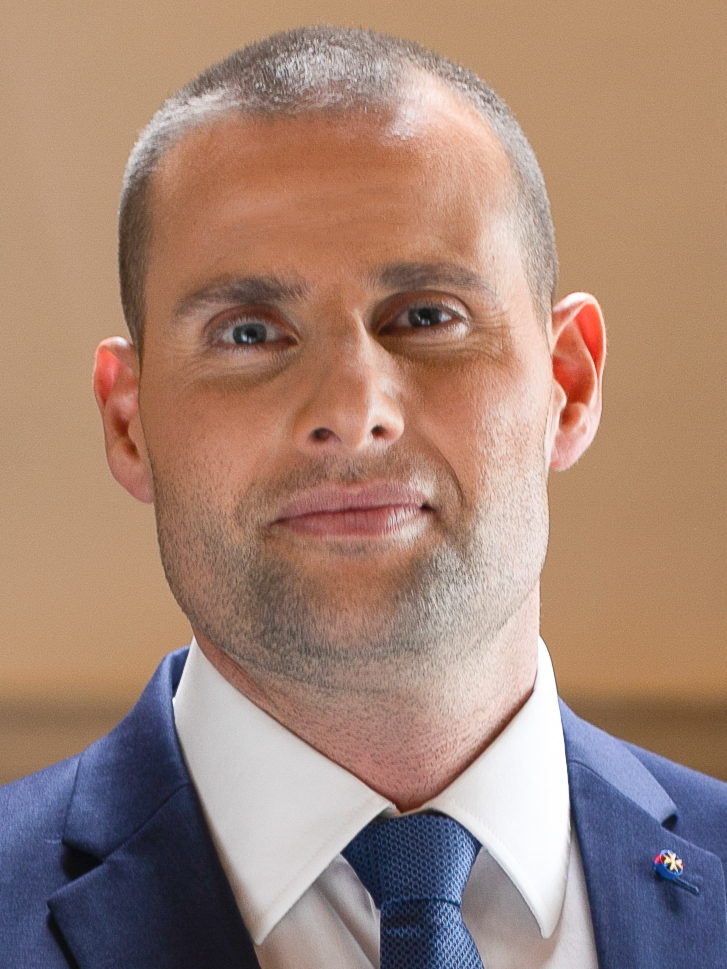

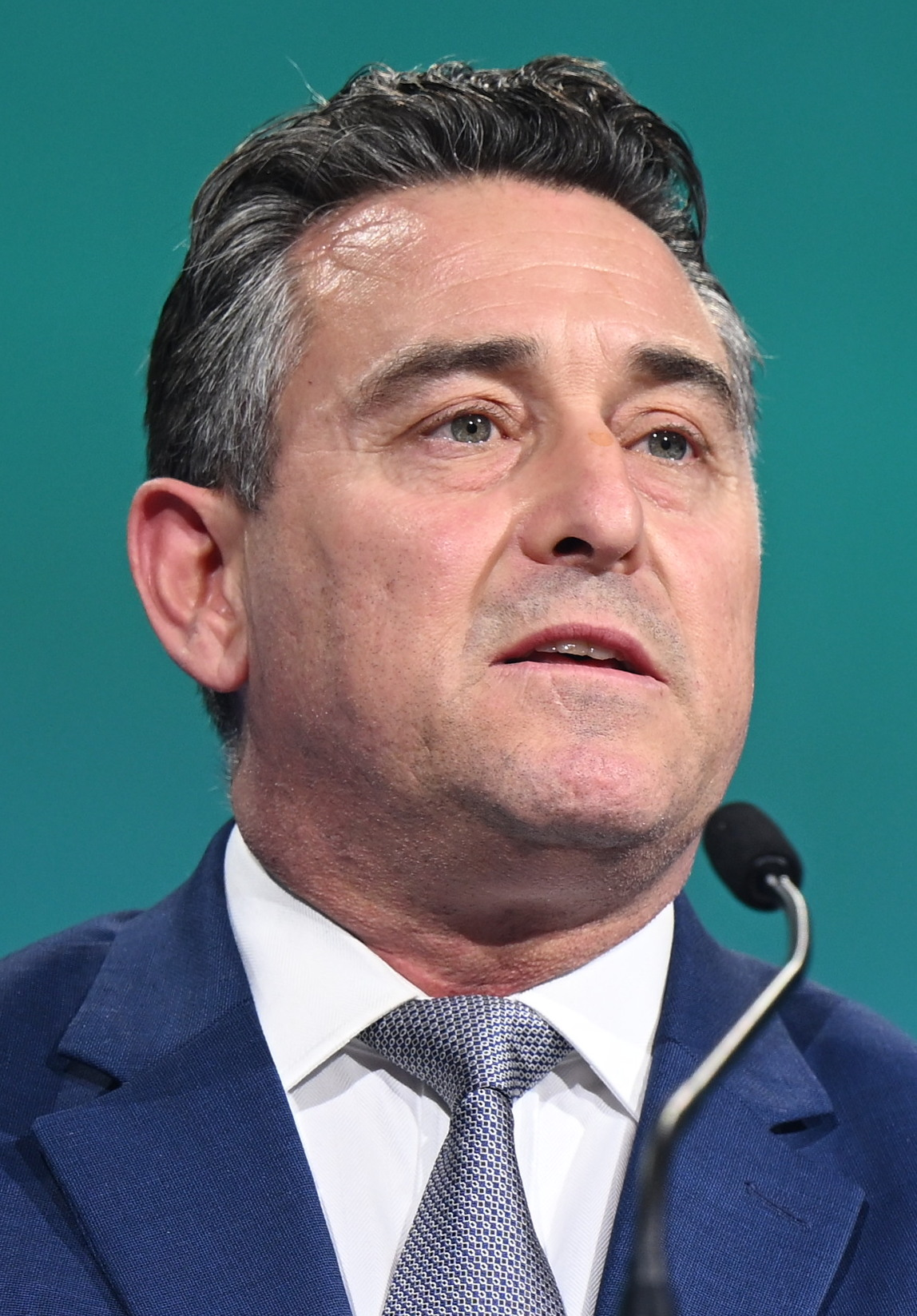
	First party	Second party
Leader	Robert Abela	Bernard Grech
Party	Labour	Nationalist
Last election	55.04%, 37 seats	42.12%, 28 seats
Seats won	44	35
Seat change	▲7	▲7
Popular vote	162,707	123,233
Percentage	55.11%	41.74%
Swing	▲0.07pp	▼1.94pp
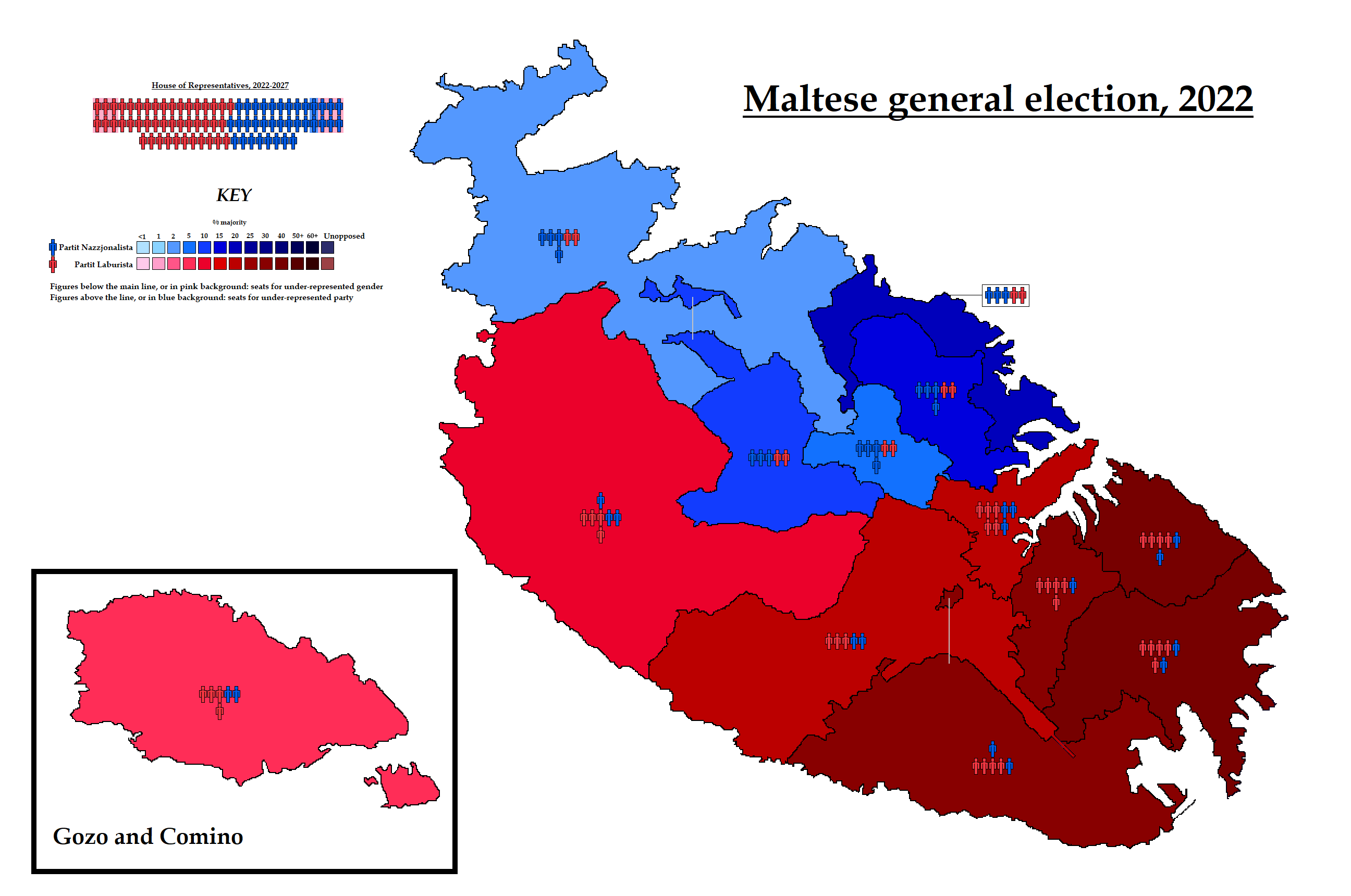
- Results by constituency
Prime Minister before election
Robert Abela
Labour
Elected Prime Minister
Robert Abela
Labour

General elections were held in Malta on 26 March 2022 to elect all members of the House of Representatives.

The Labour Party, which had governed Malta since 2013, won a second term in 2017 election under Joseph Muscat. Simon Busuttil, the leader of the opposition Nationalist Party, resigned after the 2017 election and was replaced by Adrian Delia. Following the assassination of journalist Daphne Caruana Galizia, Muscat was faced with a political crisis and mass protests in 2019 and resigned in January 2020. Robert Abela succeeded him as prime minister and leader of the Labour Party in January 2020, while Bernard Grech succeeded Delia later that year.

Journalists noted that the campaign was overshadowed by the Russian invasion of Ukraine and that it was the "quietest in decades". Six political parties nominated their candidates for the 2022 general election. The Labour Party and its leader campaigned on investing in green urbanism and environmental issues, while the Nationalist Party pledged a one billion investment in ten new economic sectors. The AD+PD campaigned on proposals for LGBT rights, while the People's Party campaigned on increasing the minimum wage and abolishing green passes. Additionally, ABBA supported the investigation into abortion-rights activists, while Volt Malta supported the legalisation of abortion. Opinion polls in the run-up to the election indicated another victory for the Labour Party.

The Labour Party retained its majority in parliament, winning a third consecutive election for the first time since 1981 with 55.11% of the popular vote, the largest share since 1955, marginally surpassing the 55.04% it scored in 2017. Voter turnout was 86%. As a result of a constitutional amendment, Article 52(A), passed before the elections, twelve seats were added to the House of Representatives and were given to women from both parties, so as to limit male dominance. Abela formed his new cabinet four days after the election.

== Background ==
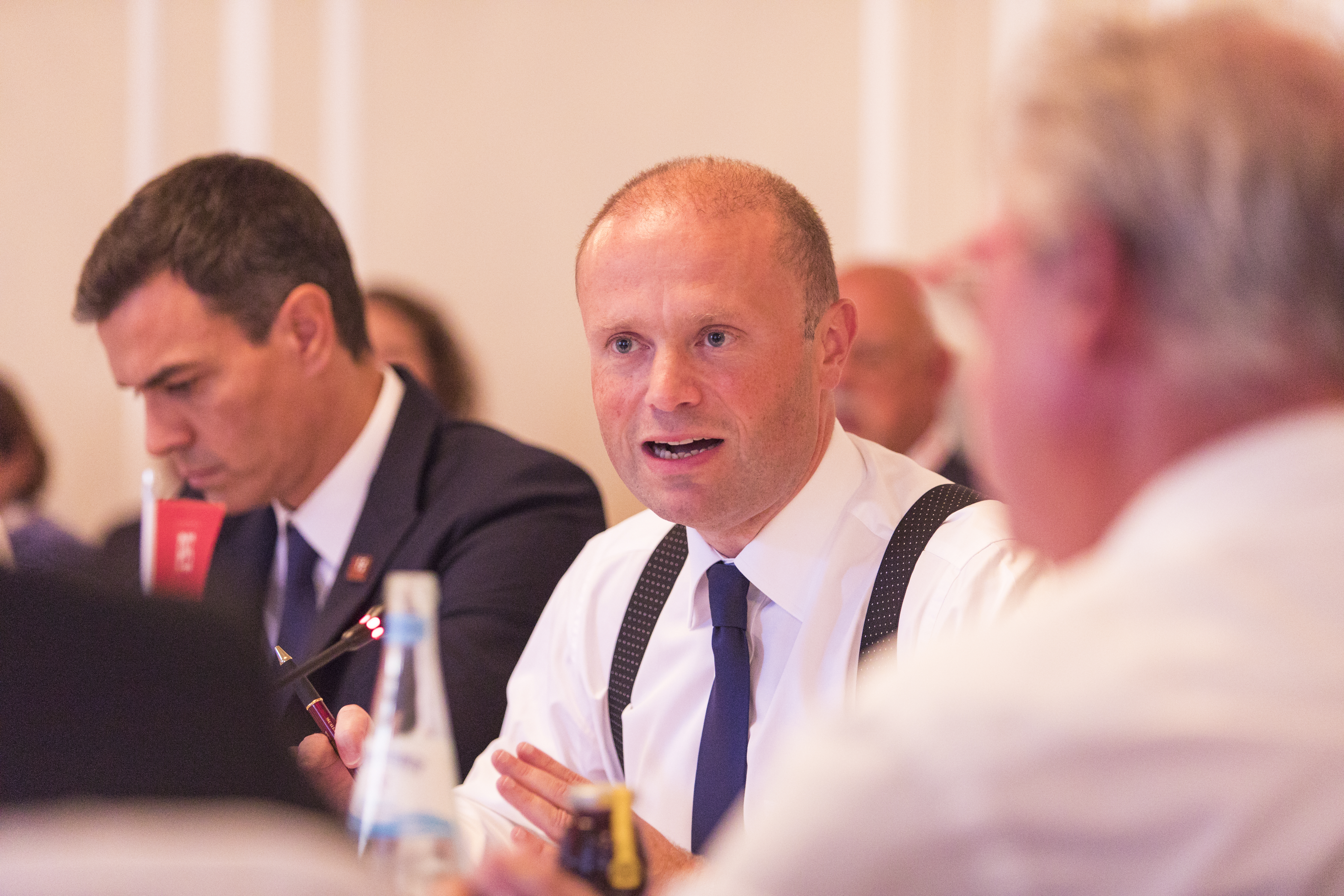
Joseph Muscat served as prime minister of Malta from 2013 until his resignation in 2020.

The previous election, which was held in June 2017, saw the Labour Party, which has governed the country since 2013, receive 55% of the popular vote and win 37 out of 67 seats in the House of Representatives. Despite the allegations of corruption towards Joseph Muscat, who had served as Prime Minister of Malta since 2013, the confidence of the government was renewed in this election. Following the election, Simon Busuttil resigned as leader of the Nationalist Party, and was replaced by Adrian Delia. Daphne Caruana Galizia, a writer and anti-corruption activist who exposed Labour Party politicians Konrad Mizzi and Keith Schembri after being named in the Panama Papers leak, was assassinated in October 2017 in a car bomb attack. The assassination eventually culminated into a political crisis that reached its peak during 2019. Subsequently, mass protests were organised between November 2019 and January 2020 in Malta and among the Maltese diaspora internationally. Muscat announced his resignation in December 2019, which took effect the following month. He remained in the House as a backbencher, but resigned in October 2020.

Robert Abela won the subsequent Labour Party leadership election, defeating Chris Fearne. He was sworn in on 13 January 2020. Abela appointed Miriam Dalli and Clyde Caruana to his new cabinet. However, after not being included in Abela's new cabinet, Deputy Labour Party leader Chris Cardona resigned and retired from politics. In October 2020, Delia lost the leadership election to Bernard Grech, who then succeeded him as leader of the parliamentary opposition. Education minister Justyne Caruana resigned in December 2021, following claims that she abused her power. Labour MP Silvio Grixti also resigned from the House that month.

== Electoral system ==
Most Maltese MPs are elected from 13 five-seat constituencies by single transferable vote using optional preferential voting. Candidates who pass the Hagenbach-Bischoff quota in the first round are elected, and any surplus votes transferred to the remaining candidates, who will be elected if this enables them to pass the quota. The lowest ranked candidates are then eliminated one-by-one with their preferences transferred to other candidates, who are elected as they achieve the quota, until all five seats are filled.

Other seats are filled to achieve other types of fairness. If a party wins a majority of first preference votes but fails to achieve a parliamentary majority, they are awarded seats to ensure a one-seat majority, if they are one of only two parties to obtain seats. As well, 12 seats are awarded to unsuccessful candidates of the "under-represented gender" if it receives less than 40 percent of the seats. Thus the Maltese parliament in total has 79 members.

Candidates are allowed to run in two different constituencies, and if elected in both, they must vacate one of the seats. Their replacement is chosen by a "casual election", in which the votes for the vacating candidate are redistributed.

In 2018 the government of Malta lowered the national voting age to 16. During the last legislature a gender-corrective mechanism was introduced, with Article 52A of the Constitution stating that provides for up to 12 additional seats for unelected candidates from "the under-represented sex" in case one of both makes up less than 40% of the elected MPs. Due to the COVID-19 pandemic, arrangements were being made for drive-through voting. After much speculation, Abela announced the election date on 20 February 2022, with the election set for 26 March. Earlier that morning, the House of Representatives was dissolved by president George Vella, upon Abela's recommendation.

== Political parties ==
The table below lists parties represented in the House of Representatives after the 2017 general election.

Name	Ideology	Political position	Leader	2017 result	
Name	Ideology	Political position	Leader	Votes (%)	Seats
Labour Party	Social democracy	Centre-left	Joseph Muscat	55.04%	37 / 67
PN–PD	Christian democracy	Centre	Simon Busuttil	43.68%	30 / 67

=== Pre-election composition ===
During the 2017–2022 convocation, several MPs resigned; Emmanuel Mallia resigned upon his appointment as the Maltese High Commissioner for the United Kingdom. Helena Dalli resigned upon her appointment as European Commissioner. Etienne Grech resigned for personal reasons. Edward Scicluna resigned and was appointed governor of the Central Bank of Malta upon his resignation. The race to fill his seat was won by Gavin Gulia, who however resigned almost immediately after being sworn in. Gulia's seat was filled by then Disability Commissioner Oliver Scicluna. Marthese Portelli resigned to take a post within the Malta Developers' Association. David Thake, himself a having taken a vacant seat (that of Busuttil), resigned due a tax scandal. Frederick Azzopardi died due to illness in October 2020.

Party	Seats
Labour Party	36
Nationalist Party	28
Independent	3

=== Participating parties ===
The Labour Party filed 122 nominations, while the Nationalist Party filed 108 nominations. ABBA filed 29 nominations in total, while AD+PD filed 20, and the People's Party filed 15 nominations. Volt Malta only filed four nominations.

Name	Founded	Leader(s)	Main ideology	Political position
Labour Party	1921	Robert Abela	Social democracy	Centre-left
Nationalist Party	1926	Bernard Grech	Christian democracy	Centre-right
AD+PD	2020	Carmel Cacopardo	Green politics	Centre-left
People's Party	2020	Paul Salomone	Right-wing populism	Right-wing to far-right
Volt Malta	2021	Arnas Lasys; Alexia DeBono	Progressivism	Centre to centre-left
ABBA	2021	Ivan Grech Mintoff	Conservatism	Right-wing

== Campaign ==
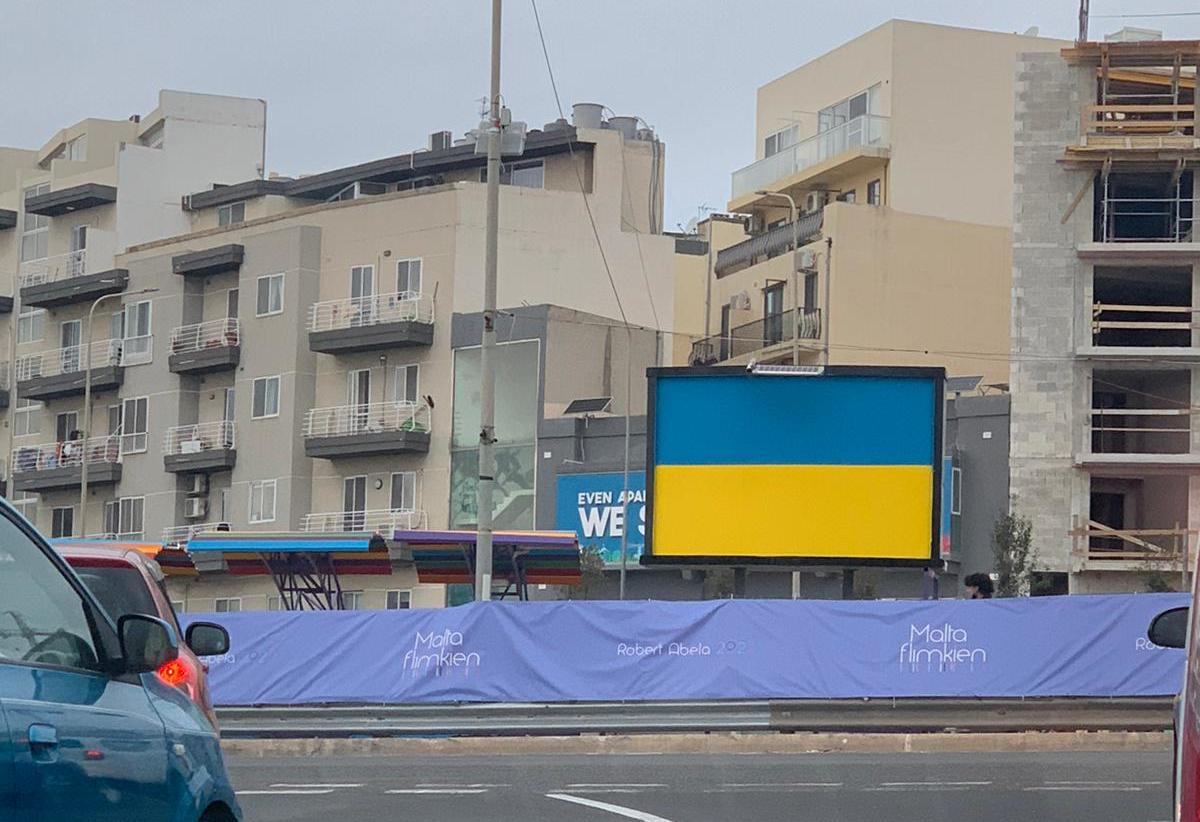
A billboard with the Ukrainian flag which was put over Labour Party banners during the campaign. News regarding the Russian invasion of Ukraine overshadowed the news of the electoral campaign in Malta.

The campaign began on 21 February, and it lasted until 24 March, while the election silence occurred on 25 March. During the first week of the campaign, Nationalist Party politicians Claudio Grech, Kirsty Debono, and Clyde Puli, decided not to run, including Rachael Scicluna, a Labour politician. The Journal noted that the campaign was the "quietest ever", due to "uninspiring proposals" and external events that overshadowed the electoral campaign. According to journalist Julian Bonnici, it was also noted that events that caused the 2019 political crisis and 2019–2020 protests, had "exhausted the voters". Moreover, the outcome was seemed to be already given, with polls indicating another Labour Party victory, but also with the Russian invasion of Ukraine overshadowing the electoral campaign events. Although, the campaign was also termed to be free of major scandals that would influence the outcome of the vote. It was also noted that the Labour Party has spent more money on campaign than the Nationalist Party.

=== Slogans ===
Party	Original slogan	English translation	Refs
Labour Party	Malta Flimkien	Malta Together	
Nationalist Party	Miegħek għal Malta	With you for Malta	
AD+PD	Xkupa Ħadra Tnaddaf	Green Sweeps Clean	
People's Party	Familja, Nazzjon, Liberta	Family, Nation, Liberty	
Volt Malta	Ivvota aħjar. Ivvota Volt.	Vote Better. Vote Volt.	

=== Debates ===
2022 Maltese general election debates
Date	Time	Organizers	P Present A Absent invitee N Non-invitee						
Date	Time	Organizers	Labour	Nationalist	AD+PD	Volt	People's	ABBA	Refs
4 March	11:00 am	The Malta Chamber	P Robert Abela	P Bernard Grech	N	N	N	N	
10 March	12:00 pm	MUDU	P Robert Abela	P Bernard Grech	P Carmel Cacopardo	N	P Paul Salamone	P Ivan Grech Mintoff	
11 March	17:30 pm	IRAA	P Evarist Bartolo	P Carm Mifsud Bonnici	P Ralph Cassar	P Arnas Lasys	N	N	
14 March	11:00 am	Chamber of SMEs	P Robert Abela	P Bernard Grech	N	N	N	N	
14 March	11:00 am	TVM	N	N	A	P Kass Mallia	P Paul Salamone	P Ivan Grech Mintoff	
16 March	11:00 am	CCEI	P Robert Abela	P Bernard Grech	N	N	N	N	
23 March	9:00 pm	TVM	P Robert Abela	P Bernard Grech	N	N	N	N	

=== Party campaigns ===
==== Labour Party ====
"Malta Together", a slogan used by the Labour Party during the campaign period

The Labour Party began its campaign in late February, during which the party stated its pledge to convert Floriana's St Anne Street into a public garden. In mid-March, the Labour Party released its election manifesto, which included investments in green urban areas, an extension to free child care to all, and slashing corporate tax rates. Abela primarily campaigned on environmental issues. Joseph Muscat, the former prime minister, also participated in Labour Party campaigns.

==== Nationalist Party ====
The election program of the Nationalist Party was released on 24 February, which had included 540 proposals in total. The party also pledged a one billion investment in ten new economic sectors. In March, the Nationalist Party also stated its support for creating free permits, licences and government services for feast organisers.

==== AD+PD ====
In total, the AD+PD had presented ten candidates for the election, while their campaign was titled "A green broom cleans". The party launched its campaign on 22 February, and it had campaigned on proposals regarding LGBT rights. The party also noted its support for energy independence through renewable sources.

==== People's Party ====
The People's Party, a right-wing to far-right party, stated its support for increasing the minimum wage and the abolishment of green passes.

==== Volt Malta ====
Volt Malta also presented itself for the first time ever, with two candidates covering four districts. In early March, the party stated its support for the legalisation of abortion. Kass Mallia was Malta's first transgender politician to run for election. Volt Malta presented a proposal for Air Malta to become a public limited company through an initial public offering and look for North American travel markets, as well as a Diaspora Pass to entice the Maltese diaspora to visit Malta.

==== ABBA ====
Ivan Grech Mintoff, who previously served as the chairman of Alliance of Change, formed the religious-right ABBA in 2021. In early March, the party presented several candidates that were members of the River of Love religious group. Some candidates were reported to be orientated towards the far-right. ABBA supported investigating into pro-choice activists who allegedly broke abortion laws.

==== Independents ====
Arnold Cassola ran as an independent candidate, advocating a "cleaner environment, cleaner politics, and a more conscientious society". Perennial candidate Nazzareno Bonnici threw his hat into the ring by mentioning that he will be running for elections on the "Eagle Party" ticket. During the International Women's Day, Bonnici proposed a €4,000 grant for women to get breast implants.

== Results ==
Voting stations were opened from 07:00 to 22:00, and in total, there were 355,075 citizens that had the right to vote in the general election. The turnout at 14:00 was reported at 44.8%, which was eight points lower than in 2017. According to the Electoral Commission of Malta, a total of 304,050 citizens voted, which made it the lowest turnout since the 1955 election. In addition to the 65 regularly elected members, two seats were awarded to the Nationalist Party to restore proportionality between votes obtained and parliamentary representation and twelve more women were appointed (six for each of the parties with elected members) to comply with the gender-corrective mechanism.

Parliament of Malta
Party	Votes	%	Seats	+/–
Labour Party	162,707	55.11	44	+7
Nationalist Party	123,233	41.74	35	+7
AD+PD	4,747	1.61	0	−2
People's Party	1,533	0.52	0	New
ABBA	1,364	0.46	0	New
Volt Malta	382	0.13	0	New
Independents	1,282	0.43	0	0
Total	295,248	100.00	79	+12
Valid votes	295,248	97.11		
Invalid/blank votes	8,802	2.89		
Total votes	304,050	100.00		
Registered voters/turnout	355,075	85.63		
Source: Electoral Commission

== Aftermath ==
Labour Party officials claimed victory shortly after 09:00, with a margin of more than 30,000 votes. Robert Abela was sworn in on 28 March, and a new government was formed on 30 March 2022. Bernard Grech, the leader of the Nationalist Party, conceded defeat, and stated that he would contest the Nationalist Party leadership election. He denounced the incumbent government's tax relief cheques, sent the week before the election, as ploys to influence the election. Grech submitted his nomination on 13 May, with no other member of the party challenging Grech for the role. The leadership election was on 27 and 28 May. Grech won 81% of the vote in the leadership election.

The Organization for Security and Co-operation in Europe (OSCE) noted that the election was organised "efficiently", although it noted that "its transparency was diminished by limited access to Electoral Commission activities, the lack of regulations allowing for election observation and limited oversight of and access to information on party and campaign financing".
