= Robert Abela =

Prime Minister of Malta since 2020

The Honourable Robert Abela KUOM MP
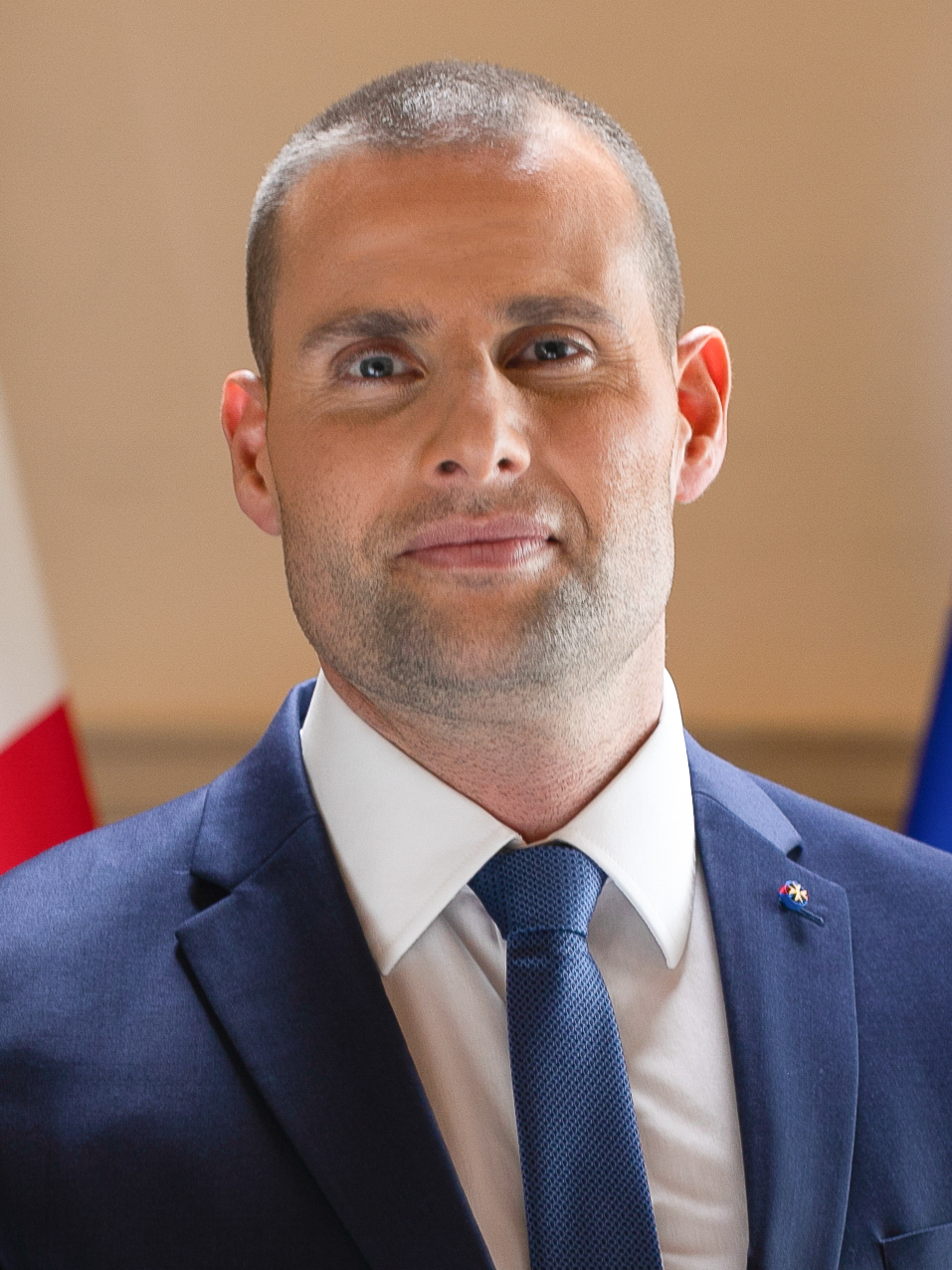
- Official portrait, 2022

14th Prime Minister of Malta
- Incumbent
- Assumed office 13 January 2020
- President: George Vella; Myriam Spiteri Debono
- Deputy: Chris Fearne (2020–2024); Ian Borg (since 2024)
- Preceded by: Joseph Muscat

9th Leader of the Labour Party
- Incumbent
- Assumed office 12 January 2020
- Deputy: Chris Fearne (2017–2024); Ian Borg (since 2024); Alex Agius Saliba (since 2024)
- Preceded by: Joseph Muscat

Member of Parliament
- Incumbent
- Assumed office April 2022
- Constituency: District 2
- In office June 2017 – March 2022
- Constituency: District 6

Personal details
- Born: 7 December 1977 (age 48) Sliema, Malta
- Party: Labour
- Spouse: Lydia Abela Zerafa (m. 2008)
- Children: 1 daughter
- Relatives: George Abela (father); Margaret Abela (mother); Alison Zerafa Civelli (sister-in-law)
- Education: University of Malta

Robert Abela KUOM (born 7 December 1977) is a Maltese lawyer and politician who has served as prime minister of Malta and leader of the Malta Labour Party since 2020, following the resignation of Joseph Muscat on 13 January that year. The son of former president George Abela, he was elected to Parliament in 2017.

== Early life and professional career ==
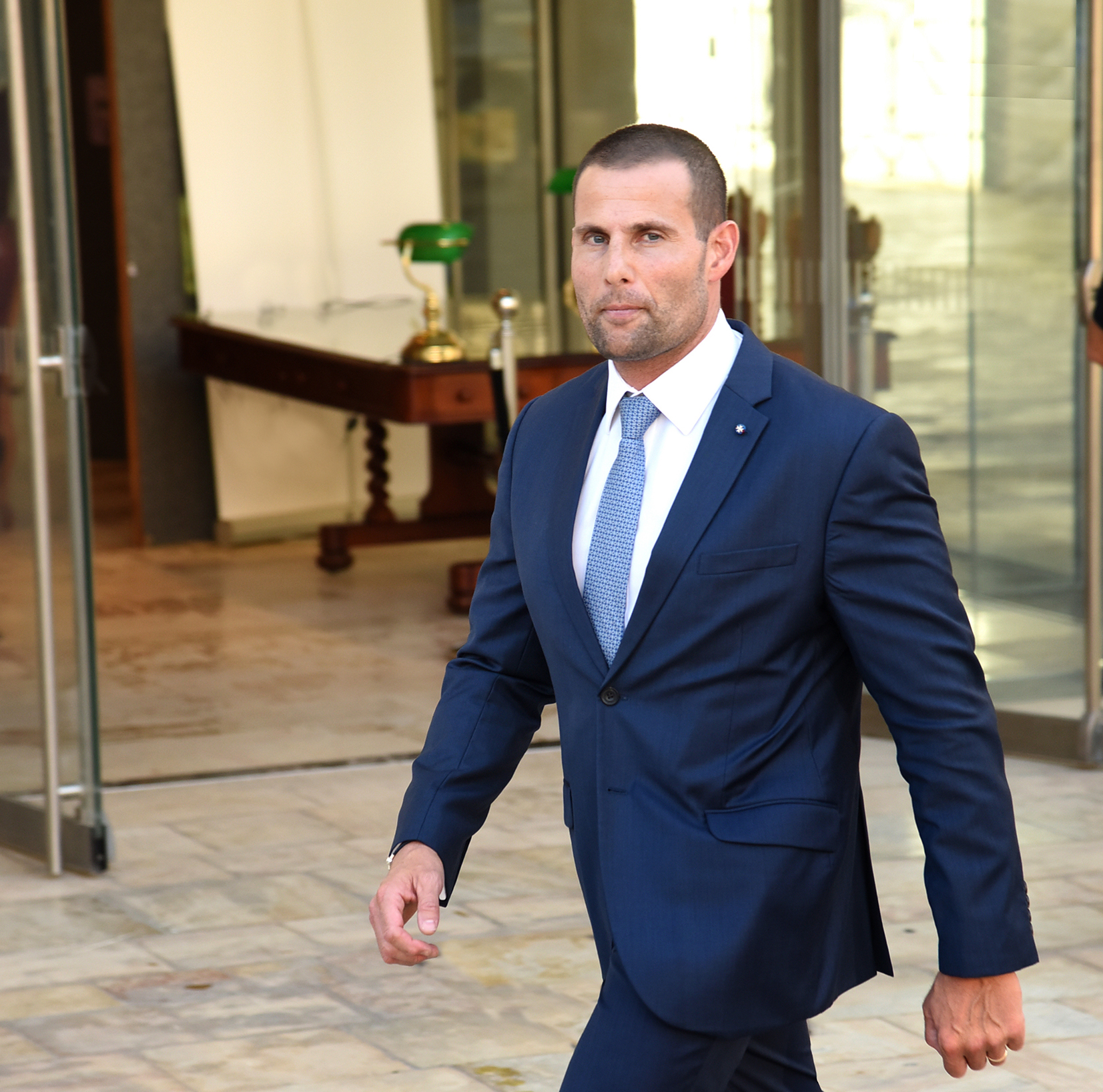
Abela outside Parliament House in 2023

Born in Sliema in the Northern Harbour District, to George Abela, a former President of Malta (2009–2014) and his wife Margaret (née Cauchi). Abela grew up with his sister Marija in Għaxaq and Marsaskala in the south of Malta. Their mother, Margaret, worked in the administration of the Old University in Valletta and later managed the family's law firm. Robert attended the Sisters' School in Santa Luċija and St Francis Primary School in Bormla, to then continue secondary school and sixth form at St Aloysius' College.

A football player in his youth, he played in goal for the national youth team. Abela also practised bodybuilding, competing twice in the national championships in the late 1990s.

Abela studied law at the University of Malta, where he met his future wife Lydia. He graduated in 2002. Following his graduation, he worked in the family's Abela Advocates law firm, specialising in industrial and labour law. His law firm's contract with Malta's Planning Authority predates Labour's election in 2013 and has been renewed yearly since.

After 2013, Abela Advocates held a licence (IIP 161) for the sale of Maltese citizenship (Individual Investors Programme), in the name of Robert's wife Lydia. The licence was dropped in early 2020 once Abela became prime minister.

== Political career ==
Abela became involved in politics while his father George Abela was deputy party leader, supporting the party in the 1996 general election. He claimed that he started off transporting sick people to the polling stations in 1996, and worked behind the scenes for many years in other roles, such as representing the party on current affairs programmes as requested by Joseph Muscat and lately as his legal advisor in Cabinet. He also supported his father in the failed Labour leadership bid against Joseph Muscat in 2008, after Alfred Sant's resignation.

On 25 January 2017, Abela highlighted that a patch of land in his native Qormi was seriously undervalued during the previous Partit Nazzjonalista administration, where contractors paid €0.9 million instead of the full value of €8 million.

Abela was described as appealing to voters with no political ties, as well as the perfect replacement to attract Marie Louise Coleiro Preca's votes in the sixth district of Siggiewi, Luqa and Qormi. He had already been approached; however, he chose his legal profession over politics.

=== Member of Parliament ===
In June 2017, at the age of 39, Abela was elected to the Parliament of Malta after his first attempt at contesting the sixth district, including Siggiewi, Luqa and Qormi, was successful. He also served as legal adviser to the Prime Minister Joseph Muscat, which enabled him to attend the meetings of the Council of Ministers.

In October 2019, Abela stated that more police were needed on Malta's streets to tackle residents' migration-related concerns.

In his years at the Parliament, Abela was never an outspoken critic of Muscat; in the fallout of the Daphne Caruana Galizia murder, he remarked that he would have "acted earlier" to remove minister Konrad Mizzi and chief of staff Keith Schembri from their posts had he been the leader.

=== 2020 Labour leadership election ===
Following the announcement of Joseph Muscat's upcoming resignation due to the assassination of Daphne Caruana Galizia, and the ensuing protests, deputy prime minister Chris Fearne was considered the front-runner to replace Muscat as leader of the party and prime minister, and other hopefuls (including Ian Borg and Miriam Dalli) were reportedly pressured not to run in order to allow a quick transition by Christmas 2019 with the formality of a vote by party members for a single candidate. Robert Abela remarked that he did not want to be a part of any "diabolical pact", and presented his candidacy as an alternative to Chris Fearne. However, according to James Debono, Abela was soon recognised as the "continuity" candidate instead of Fearne, emphasising stability, unity and normality, as opposed to the bolder changes advocated by Fearne.

Abela's leadership campaign was focused on party members and aimed at striking a chord with the traditional Labour themes (social housing, free medicines for the elderly and better employment conditions for blue-collar workers) while distancing himself from the coziness of Muscat with big business. He also called for a crack-down on cheap labour migrant workers, who he accused of repressing local salaries, by proposing that employers be allowed to hire foreigners only if able to pay them fully on the books and while respecting work condition regulations. He also guaranteed the continuation of Malta's controversial citizenship-by-investment programme.

Abela, a backbencher with no ministerial experience, presented himself as a candidate of continuity, pledging to maintain the same cabinet as Muscat's, as well as the same staff at the powerful Office of the Prime Minister, in opposition to Chris Fearne, whose campaign for a clean slate at Castille created apprehension among insiders.

Abela was openly critical of the 2019 Malta political crisis surrounding the Daphne Caruana Galizia car bombing. In fact, on 28 November 2019, he claimed that the Labour Party would need deep rooted changes rather than superficial ones. Abela also claimed that the only purpose of the 2019 Maltese protests was provocation.

Abela stated that his family law firm headed by his wife should retain the right to bid for public tenders, should he take up office. Following controversies, he later backtracked and committed not to seek public contracts for his family law firm.

His campaign was criticised for not accepting any interviews from the independent press, but only relying on Labour-friendly media outlets.

=== Leader of the Labour Party and Prime Minister of Malta ===
At the internal party elections on 12 January 2020, Abela obtained 9,342 votes against 6,798 for Chris Fearne. Over 92% of MLP members cast their vote in party clubs across the country. Abela was thus proclaimed new leader of the Labour Party. The following day, Joseph Muscat resigned from the post of prime minister. President George Vella accepted Muscat's resignation and appointed Abela as new Prime Minister of Malta. His first official appointment was that of Clyde Caruana as his chief of staff.

He led the party into the 2022 Maltese general election, which returned a third consecutive victory for the Labour Party. His party also achieved its highest vote share since 1955, with 55.11%.

In 2024, Abela was heavily criticised by the opposition, as well as the judiciary, after accusing an inquiring Magistrate of engaging in "Political Terrorism" after criminal charges were filed against his disgraced predecessor, Joseph Muscat. In the same year, he was also criticised for his weak stance against greedy developers who despite breaching development regulations, are still allowed to carry on with construction projects to the detriment of local residents and the environment.

On 24 January 2025, Yorgen Fenech, one of the alleged masterminds accused of orchestrating the murder of journalist Daphne Caruana Galizia was granted bail. This decision created much controversy, with one of Caruana Galiza's sons blaming Prime Minister Abela, and the Minister of Justice Jonathan Attard for failing to reform the justice system, and accusing them to be on the side of criminals. A few days later on 30 January 2025, Abela was lambasted by the PN opposition and the Institute of Maltese Journalists for voting against the amendments proposed by the opposition with regards to anti-SLAPP laws which seek to protect journalists, media outlets, blogs and other publications from aggravating costly lawsuits intended to frighten reporters into silence.

Abela led the Labour Party into the 2026 Maltese general election, which returned a historic fourth consecutive Labour government. His party won 42 seats with 51.77% of the vote.

== Personal life ==
In 2008, he married Lydia Abela (née Zerafa), who later took the role of secretary of the Labour Party executive committee. They have a daughter, Giorgia Mae, born in 2012.

The Abela family live in a penthouse fronting the sea in Marsaskala. They also own a large farmhouse in Xewkija, Gozo.

In 2017, the Abelas bought a large rural mansion, Villa Cinja in Xrobb l-Ghagin, in the limits of Zejtun. The €600,000 sale came just days after the Planning Authority sanctioned multiple illegalities on the site. At the time, Abela headed the legal office of the Planning Authority; he denied any influence on the decision. The villa was later demolished for redevelopment.

== Honours ==
=== National honours ===
- Malta: Companion of Honour of the National Order of Merit (2020) by right as a Prime Minister of Malta

== See also ==
- List of current heads of state and government
- List of heads of the executive by approval rating

== See also ==
- List of members of the parliament of Malta, 2017–2022

Party political offices
Preceded by Joseph Muscat	Leader of the Labour Party; 2020–present	Incumbent
Political offices
Preceded by Joseph Muscat	Prime Minister of Malta; 2020–present	Incumbent
