= List of members of the parliament of Malta, 2026–2031 =

This is a list of all the members of the Maltese House of Representatives elected to the 15th legislature in the 2026 Maltese General Election.

In the parliament, the Labour Party holds the majority of seats after securing a forth consecutive victory: 42 are members of the Labour Party and 37 of the Nationalist Party.

== Members ==
The following are the 67 members.

Costintuency	Labour	Nationalist	Independent
District 1	Keith Azzopardi Tanti; Deo Debattista; Nigel Vella; Fleur Abela; Cressida Galea	Darren Carabott; Paula Mifsud Bonnici	
District 2	Robert Abela; Clyde Caruana; Glenn Bedingfield; Alison Zerafa Civelli; Clint Azzopardi Flores	Stephen Spiteri; Bernice Bonello	
District 3	Chris Fearne; Chris Bonett; Owen Bonnici; Carmelo Abela; Andy Ellul; Ray Abela	Stephen Spiteri; Janice Abela Chetcuti; John Baptist Camilleri	
District 4	Chris Fearne; Byron Camilleri; Jonathan Attard	Mark Anthony Sammut; Michael Piccinino	
District 5	Robert Abela; Omar Farrugia; Miriam Dalli	Toni Bezzina; Conrad Borg Manché; Stanley Zammit; Miriana Calleja Testaferrata De Noto	
District 6	Ian Borg; Silvio Schembri; Rosianne Cutajar	Jerome Caruana Cilia; Julian Borg; Annabelle Cilia (Muscat)	
District 7	Ian Borg; Julia Farrugia Portelli; Malcolm Paul Aguis Galea; Naomi Cachia	Adrian Delia; Rebekah Borg; Ian Mario Vassallo; Andrew Agius	
District 8	Clyde Caruana; John Grech; Ramona Attard; Yana Borg Debono Grech	Adrian Delia; Beppe Fenech Adami; Justin Schembri; Julie Zahra	
District 9	Clifton Grima; Michael Falzon; Mariah Meli; Rebecca Buttigieg	Joe Giglio; Eve Borg Bonello; Alex Perici Calascione; Marilena Gauci	
District 10	Michael Falzon; Clifton Grima	Joe Giglio; Conrad Borg Manché; Mark Anthony Sammut; Graham Bencini; Graziella Attard Previ	
District 11	Miriam Dalli; Anthony Agius Decelis; Alex Muscat; Francesca Zarb; Romilda Zarb	Ivan Bartolo; Bernard Grech; Rebekah Borg	
District 12	Jonathan Attard; Alicia Bugeja Said; Franco Mercieca; Deborah Schembri	Alex Borg; Ivan Castillo; Graziella Galea; George Vital Zammit	
District 13	Clint Camilleri; Anton Refalo; Jo Etienne Abela	Alex Borg; Beppe Galea; Frank-Anthony Tabone; Norma Camilleri	
