= District 8, Malta =

Electoral district in Malta

District 8
- Parliament of Malta constituency
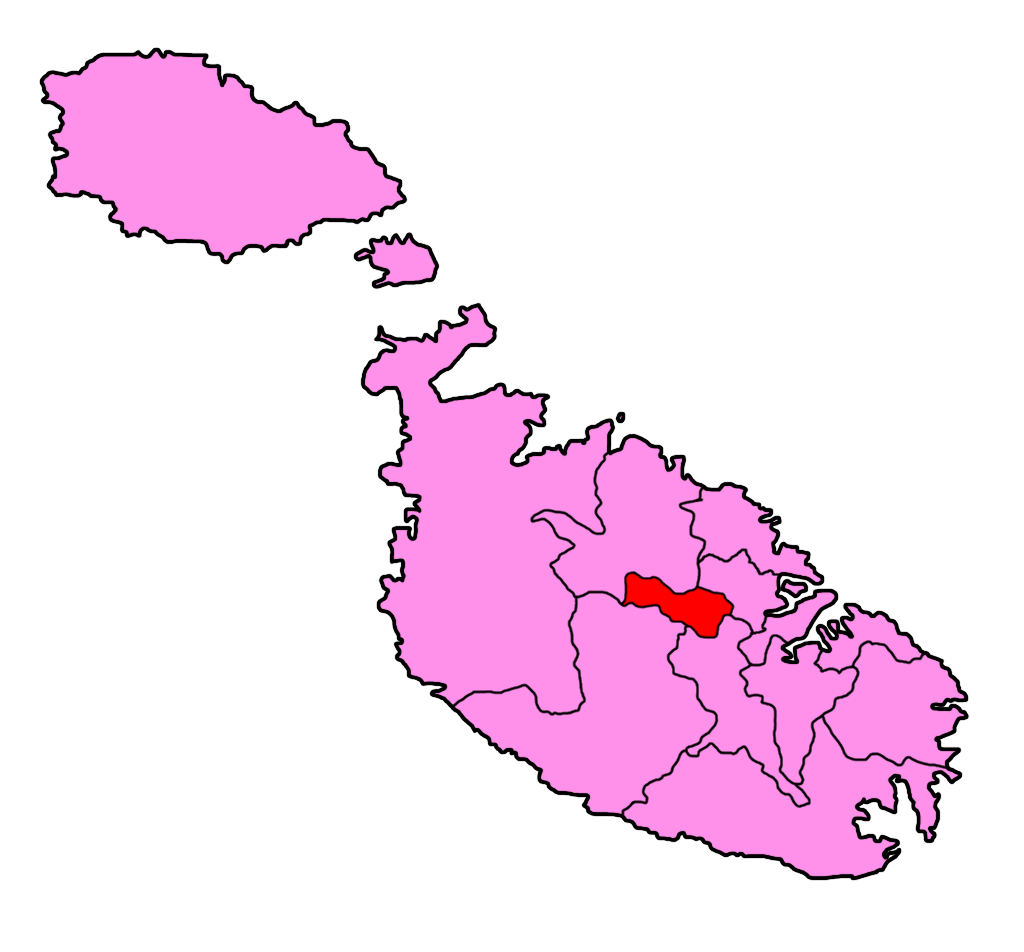
- District within Malta

Current constituency
- Created: 1921
- Seats: 5

District 8 is an electoral district in Malta. It was established in 1921. Its boundaries have changed many times but it currently consists of the localities of Birkirkara, Iklin, Lija and Balzan.

== Representatives ==
Election	Representatives				
1921	Alfonso Maria Hili (DNP)	Enrico Mizzi (DNP)	Giuseppe Micallef (DNP)	Luigi Camilleri (DNP)	4 seats
1924	Gerald Strickland (Conservative)	Enrico Mizzi (DNP)	Giuseppe Micallef (DNP)	Giuseppe Micallef (DNP)	4 seats
1932	Gerald Strickland (Conservative)	Enrico Mizzi (DNP)	Giuseppe Micallef (DNP)	Giuseppe Cremona (Nationalist)	Roger Strickland (Conservative)
1947	Anton Calleja (Gozo)	Francesco Camilleri (Jones)	Francesco Masini (Gozo)	Guzeppi Cefai (Gozo)	Henry Jones (Jones)
1950	Amabile Cauchi (Workers')	Cecilia De Trafford Strickland (Conservative)	George Galea (Nationalist)	Giuseppi Cauchi (Independent)	Paul Portelli (DAP)
1951	Amabile Cauchi (Workers')	Cecilia De Trafford Strickland (Conservative)	George Galea (Nationalist)	Giuseppi Cefai (Workers')	Carmelo Refalo (Nationalist)
1953	Amabile Cauchi (Workers')	Anglu Camilleri (Labour)	George Galea (Nationalist)	Lorenzo Debrincat (Labour)	Carmelo Refalo (Nationalist)
1955	Amabile Cauchi (Workers')	Anglu Camilleri (Labour)	Marcell Mizzi (Labour)	Wenzu Debrincat (Labour)	Carmelo Refalo (Nationalist)
1962	Albert Hyzler (Labour)	Anton Buttigieg (Labour)	Toni Pellegrini (CWP)	Giuseppe Maria Camilleri (Nationalist)	Tommaso Caruana Demajo (Nationalist)
1966	Albert Hyzler (Labour)	Anton Buttigieg (Labour)	Guido de Marco (Nationalist)	Giuseppe Maria Camilleri (Nationalist)	Tommaso Caruana Demajo (Nationalist)
1971	John Buttigieg (Labour)	Anton Buttigieg (Labour)	Guido de Marco (Nationalist)	Joseph Philip Sciberras (Labour)	Tommaso Caruana Demajo (Nationalist)
1976	Evelyn Bonaci (Labour)	Joe Debono Grech (Labour)	Eddie Fenech Adami (Nationalist)	Joe Fenech (Nationalist)	Lino (Carmel) Gauci Borda (Nationalist)
1981	Gontran Borg (Labour)	Joe Debono Grech (Labour)	Noel Buttigieg Scicluna (Nationalist)	Joe Fenech (Nationalist)	Lino (Carmel) Gauci Borda (Nationalist)
1987	Carmen Sant (Labour)	Joe Debono Grech (Labour)	Eddie Fenech Adami (Nationalist)	Joe Fenech (Nationalist)	Lino Gauchi Borda (Nationalist)
1992	Alfred Sant (Labour)	Joe Debono Grech (Labour)	Eddie Fenech Adami (Nationalist)	Joe Fenech (Nationalist)	Lino Gauchi Borda (Nationalist)
1996	Christopher Cardona (Labour)	Joe Debono Grech (Labour)	Richard Muscat (Nationalist)	Josef Bonnici (Nationalist)	Tonio Borg (Nationalist)
1998	Christopher Cardona (Labour)	Joe Debono Grech (Labour)	Michael Asciak (Nationalist)	Josef Bonnici (Nationalist)	Tonio Borg (Nationalist)
2003	Christopher Cardona (Labour)	Joe Debono Grech (Labour)	Michael Asciak (Nationalist)	Tonio Fenech (Nationalist)	Tonio Borg (Nationalist)
2008	Christopher Cardona (Labour)	Joe Debono Grech (Labour)	Stephen Spiteri (Nationalist)	Tonio Fenech (Nationalist)	Tonio Borg (Nationalist)
2013	Christopher Cardona (Labour)	Joe Debono Grech (Labour)	Edward Zammit Lewis (Labour)	Tonio Fenech (Nationalist)	Beppe Fenech Adami (Nationalist)
2017	Christopher Cardona (Labour)	David Agius (Nationalist)	Edward Zammit Lewis (Labour)	Therese Comodini Cachia (Nationalist)	Beppe Fenech Adami (Nationalist)
2022	Clyde Caruana (Labour)	Justin Schembri (Nationalist)	Edward Zammit Lewis (Labour)	Adrian Delia (Nationalist)	Beppe Fenech Adami (Nationalist)
