= District 1, Malta =

Electoral district in Malta

Coordinates: 35°53′50″N 14°30′40″E

District 1
- Parliament of Malta constituency
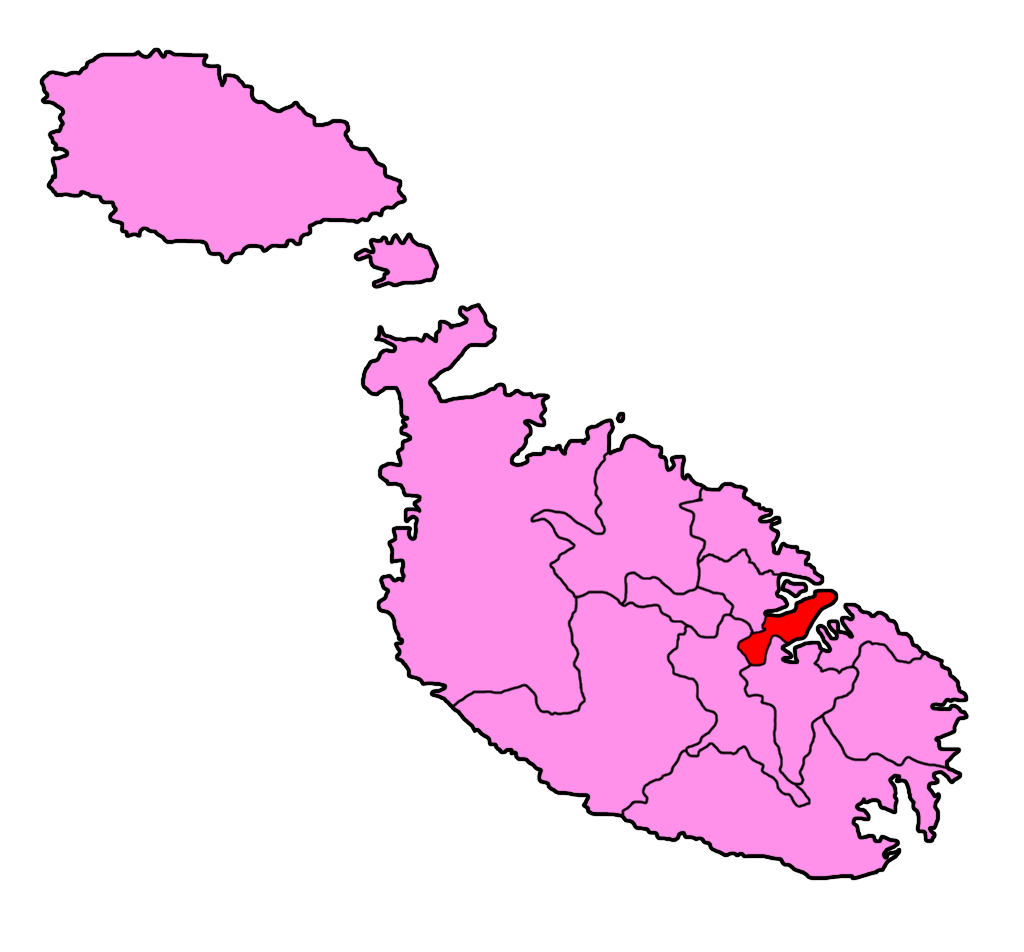
- District within Malta

Current constituency
- Created: 1921
- Seats: 5

District 1 is an electoral district in Malta. It was established in 1921. Its boundaries have changed many times; however, it currently consists of the localities of Valletta, Floriana, Ħamrun, Marsa, Pietà and Santa Venera

== Representatives ==
=== 1889-1921: one seat ===
Date	Representative
1889	Sigismondo Savona
1898	C. Bugeli
1899	Andrè Pullicino
1915	Ċikku Azzopardi
1917	Andrè Pullicino

=== 1921-present: five seats ===
Election	Representatives				
1921	Edgardo Arrigo (UPM)	Alfred Gera De Petri (Conservative)	Giovanni Adami (UPM)	Ugo Pasqale Mifsud (UPM)	4 seats 1921–1932
1924	Carlo Mallia (DNP)	Alfred Gera De Petri (Conservative)	Edoardo L. Galea (UPM)	Robert V. Galea (Conservative)	4 seats 1921–1932
1927	Carlo Mallia (DNP)	Alfred Gera De Petri (Conservative)	Robert Galea (Conservative)	Ugo P. Mifsud (Nationalist)	4 seats 1921–1932
1932	Carlo Mallia (DNP)	A. Gera De Petri (Conservative)	Giuseppi Hyzler (Nationalist)	Ugo P. Mifsud (Nationalist)	Ugo Mifsud (Nationalist)
1939	Paul Boffa (Labour)	Gerald Strickland (Conservative)	Giorgio Borg Olivier (Nationalist)	Ugo P. Mifsud (Nationalist)	Ugo Mifsud (Nationalist)
1945	Dominic Mintoff (Labour)	John Raimondo (Labour)	Joseph Cassar (Labour)	Karmenu Vassallo (Labour)	Pawlu Boffa (Labour)
1947	Bertram Camilleri (Labour)	Guze Ellul (Labour)	Guze Miceli (Labour)	Joseph Hyzler (DAP)	Enrico Mizzi (Nationalist)
1950	Dom Mintoff (Labour)	Joseph Anthony Miceli (Workers')	R.V. Galea (Conservative)	Giorgio De Giorgio (Nationalist)	Enrico Mizzi (Nationalist)
1951	Fanny Attard Bezzina (Labour)	Joseph Salinos (Labour)	George De Giorgio (Nationalist)	Robert Borg (Nationalist)	Giorgio Borg Olivier (Nationalist)
1953	Dom Mintoff (Labour)	Joseph Salinos (Labour)	Pawlu Boffa (Workers')	Paolo Pace (Nationalist)	Giorgio Borg Olivier (Nationalist)
1955	Cikku Bonaci (Labour)	Joseph Salinos (Labour)	Henry Sacco (Labour)	Paolo Pace (Nationalist)	Benedict Camilleri (Nationalist)
1962	Joseph Micallef Stafrace (Labour)	Dom Mintoff (Labour)	Herbert Ganado (DNP)	Paolo Pace (Nationalist)	Benny Camilleri (Nationalist)
1966	Joseph Micallef Stafrace (Labour)	Dom Mintoff (Labour)	Emanuel Bonnici (Nationalist)	Paolo Pace (Nationalist)	Giorgio Borg Olivier (Nationalist)
1971	Joseph Micallef Stafrace (Labour)	Joseph Brincat (Labour)	Emanuel Bonnici (Nationalist)	Herman Farrugia (Nationalist)	Giorgio Borg Olivier (Nationalist)
1976	Danny Cremona (Labour)	Joseph Brincat (Labour)	Emanuel Bonnici (Nationalist)	Herman Farrugia (Nationalist)	John J. Borg (Labour)
1981	Danny Cremona (Labour)	Joseph Brincat (Labour)	Emanuel Bonnici (Nationalist)	Herman Farrugia (Nationalist)	Dom Mintoff (Labour)
1987	Joe Grima (Labour)	Joseph Brincat (Labour)	Emanuel Bonnici (Nationalist)	Karmenu Mifsud Bonnici (Labour)	Ray Bondin (Nationalist)
1992	Sandro Schembri Adami (Labour)	Guido de Marco (Nationalist)	Antoine Mifsud Bonnici (Nationalist)	Karmenu Mifsud Bonnici (Labour)	Louis Cuschieri (Nationalist)
1996	Josè Herrera (Labour)	Alfred Sant (Labour)	Antoine Mifsud Bonnici (Nationalist)	Austin Gatt (Nationalist)	Jean Pierre Farrugia (Nationalist)
1998	Josè Herrera (Labour)	Alfred Sant (Labour)	Antoine Mifsud Bonnici (Nationalist)	Austin Gatt (Nationalist)	Jean Pierre Farrugia (Nationalist)
2003	Josè Herrera (Labour)	Alfred Sant (Labour)	Antoine Mifsud Bonnici (Nationalist)	Austin Gatt (Nationalist)	Mario de Marco (Nationalist)
2008	Josè Herrera (Labour)	Alfred Sant (Labour)	Luciano Musuttil (Labour)	Austin Gatt (Nationalist)	Mario de Marco (Nationalist)
2013	Josè Herrera (Labour)	Louis Grech (Labour)	Deo Debattista (Labour)	Claudio Grech (Nationalist)	Mario de Marco (Nationalist)
2017	Josè Herrera (Labour)	Aaron Farrugia (Labour)	Deo Debattista (Labour)	Claudio Grech (Nationalist)	Mario de Marco (Nationalist)
2022	Keith Azzopardi Tanti (Labour)	Aaron Farrugia (Labour)	Deo Debattista (Labour)	Darren Carabott (Nationalist)	Mario de Marco (Nationalist)

== Elections ==
=== 2022 general election ===
2022 general election: District 1
Party	Candidate	FPv%	Count																					
Party	Candidate	FPv%	1	2	3	4	5	6	7	8	9	10	11	12	13	14	15	16	17	18	19	20	21	22
Labour Party	Keith Azzopardi Tanti	17.4	3,774																					
Nationalist Party	Darren Carabott	10.2	2,203	2,204	2,204	2,204	2,204	2,204	2,205	2,217	2,220	2,224	2,230	2,312	2,337	2,337	2,338	2,343	2,584	3,107	3,115	4,136		
Nationalist Party	Mario de Marco	10.4	2,253	2,254	2,254	2,255	2,255	2,256	2,257	2,263	2,264	2,270	2,277	2,311	2,333	2,335	2,335	2,336	2,471	2,732	2,735	3,995	3,995	
Labour Party	Deo Debattista	10.6	2,290	2,323	2,326	2,326	2,326	2,341	2,355	2,355	2,357	2,361	2,369	2,372	2,383	2,461	2,539	2,874	2,875	2,884	3,446	3,458	3,469	3,476
Labour Party	Aaron Farrugia	10.9	2,363	2,399	2,399	2,399	2,400	2,409	2,417	2,417	2,419	2,422	2,425	2,426	2,438	2,536	2,617	2,679	2,682	2,684	3,206	3,221	3,229	3,236
Labour Party	Josè Herrera	9.8	2,130	2,152	2,153	2,153	2,154	2,166	2,168	2,169	2,170	2,171	2,174	2,176	2,185	2,229	2,312	2,362	2,367	2,371	2,699	2,712	2,721	2,723
Nationalist Party	Paula Mifsud Bonnici (Note: Elected under article 52A(1) (gender balance mechanism).)	8.1	1,748	1,748	1,748	1,748	1,748	1,749	1,749	1,768	1,770	1,771	1,774	1,840	1,879	1,880	1,885	1,886	2,051	2,381	2,404			
Labour Party	Cressida Galea	5.2	1,137	1,171	1,175	1,177	1,178	1,187	1,194	1,194	1,194	1,194	1,199	1,199	1,211	1,281	1,447	1,533	1,535	1,540				
Nationalist Party	James Aaron Ellul	4.4	955	955	955	956	956	956	956	962	964	966	969	1,014	1,028	1,028	1,035	1,035	1,174					
Nationalist Party	Christian Micallef	3.0	656	656	656	657	657	657	657	662	662	662	663	695	705	705	706	708						
Labour Party	Ray Abela	2.1	449	458	459	459	460	462	477	477	477	477	481	483	494	530	562							
Labour Party	Davina Sammut Hili	1.9	411	419	420	420	420	423	428	428	428	428	428	430	433	465								
Labour Party	Andy Ellul	1.6	346	357	358	358	359	360	366	366	366	366	366	366	369									
AD+PD	Anthony Buttigieg	1.1	244	244	244	245	249	249	250	255	257	269	290	296										
Nationalist Party	Justin Schembri	1.2	267	267	267	267	267	267	269	276	276	276	280											
People's Party	Joe Aquilina	0.3	72	72	72	77	77	77	77	77	125	148												
ABBA	Sammy Farrugia	0.3	64	64	64	64	98	98	98	99	101													
People's Party	Clint Calleja	0.3	66	66	66	69	70	70	70	70														
Nationalist Party	Josianne Cardona Gatt	0.3	62	62	62	62	62	62	62															
Labour Party	Sean Apap Meli	0.3	55	56	61	61	61	62																
Labour Party	Chris Grima	0.2	54	55	55	55	55																	
ABBA	Tania Gauci	0.2	40	40	41	45																		
Independent	Noel Apap	0.1	29	29	29																			
Labour Party	Joseph Matthew Attard	0.1	16	18																				
Electorate: 25,863 Valid: 21,684 Spoilt: 545 (2.5%) Quota: 3,615 Turnout: 22,229 (85.9%)
