= Nigel Vella =

Maltese Member of Parliament

The Honourable Nigel Vella MP

Chairman of the Parliamentary Petitions Committee
- Incumbent
- Assumed office 28 June 2026
- Preceded by: Chris Agius

Member of the Maltese House of Representatives
- Incumbent
- Assumed office 20 June 2026 Serving with Keith Azzopardi Tanti, Deo Debattista, Fleur Abela, Cressida Galea, Darren Carabott, and Paula Mifsud Bonnici
- Constituency: District 1

Personal details
- Born: Ħamrun, Malta
- Citizenship: Malta
- Party: Partit Laburista (Labour Party)
- Spouse: Elaine Degiorgio
- Children: Ben Vella
- Education: University of Malta (Bachelor of Arts in History, Bachelor of Laws)

Nigel Vella is a Maltese politician, lawyer, and media executive currently serving as a Member of Parliament for the Labour Party in the 15th Legislature of the Parliament of Malta for the parliamentary district of District 1.

== Early life and education ==
Vella grew up in Ħamrun, he pursued higher education at the University of Malta, where he graduated with a Bachelor of Arts in History in 2012. He later returned to adult education and completed a Bachelor of Laws Degree in 2026, according to him he had already begun a Law Course at the University of Malta in 2007 however failed the course's first year twice.

== Career ==
Before candidacy, Vella worked extensively in political communications and media administration. He served as the Head of Communications for the Labour Party, Deputy Head of Communications for the Government of Malta, and later as a consultant within the Ministry for Home Affairs. In 2025, he was appointed Chief Executive Officer (CEO) of the state owned Mediterranean Conference Centre in Valletta.

== Multiple 'positions of trust' controversy ==
In early 2021, The Shift News published an exposé on Nigel Vella accusing him of accumulating multiple "positions of trust". The publication revealed he was obtaining a full-time salary as the Deputy Head of Communications at the Office of the Prime Minister while simultaneously serving as a policy consultant for the Gozo Ministry. He was accused by the publication of using his appointment at the board of directors for the Malta Digital Innovation Authority for an additional director's honourarium, and calculated all of the costs for the taxpayer from his combined positions at an estimated €90,000 per year. The article heavily criticised the Prime Minister, Robert Abela for refusing to explain how a single "person of trust" could legally fulfill multiple separate public consultancies at once.

Following the Publication, the Maltese NGO by the name of 'Repubblika' formally requested that the Commissioner for Standards in Public Life launch an investigation about the legal and ethical questions raised in the publication surrounding the arrangement. The complaint alleged that he was serving multiple full-time positions. In his defence, Vella maintained that his policy consultancy contract with the Gozo Ministry was a part-time role. The Standards Commissioner declined to investigate further, concluding that the contract explicitly designated the position as part-time, requiring 10 hours of work per week.

== 2024 Labour Party CEO appointment ==
In August 2024, after Randolph De Battista stepped down from the role, Vella was widely considered the frontrunner to be appointed as the new Chief Executive Officer of the Labour Party following discussions with Robert Abela. However, unexpectedly to most Leonid McKay was appointed to the position instead.

Shortly after the announcement, Vella published a cryptic post on Facebook criticising the decision-making process, writing:

"A phone call that changes everything. Not even face to face because that is too hard. A punch, two punches, this time around nothing will go unchallenged."

— Nigel Vella, Deleted Facebook Post (Translated to English), August 2024

Vella deleted the post shortly afterward and later published a statement reaffirming his continued loyalty to the Labour Party:

"Let me remove any doubt for anyone who is rubbing their hands. I was born a Labourite, and I will die a Labourite. I have been and will remain a member of the party. I am made of steel and nothing, and no one will break me. As I have always done for the last 20 years, I will be where my heart beats."

— Nigel Vella, Facebook Post (Translated to English), August 2024

== 2026 general election ==
Vella contested the 2026 Maltese general election as a new entry candidate on the Labour Party ticket in District 1, which encompasses Valletta, Floriana, Santa Venera, Pietà, Marsa and Ħamrun. He was successfully elected to the House of Representatives during the initial count on 31 May 2026 and took his oath of office on 20 June 2026. Following his election, he was appointed Chairman of the Parliamentary Petitions Committee and named a member of the Public accounts committee.
