= District 6, Malta =

Electoral district in Malta

District 6
- Parliament of Malta constituency
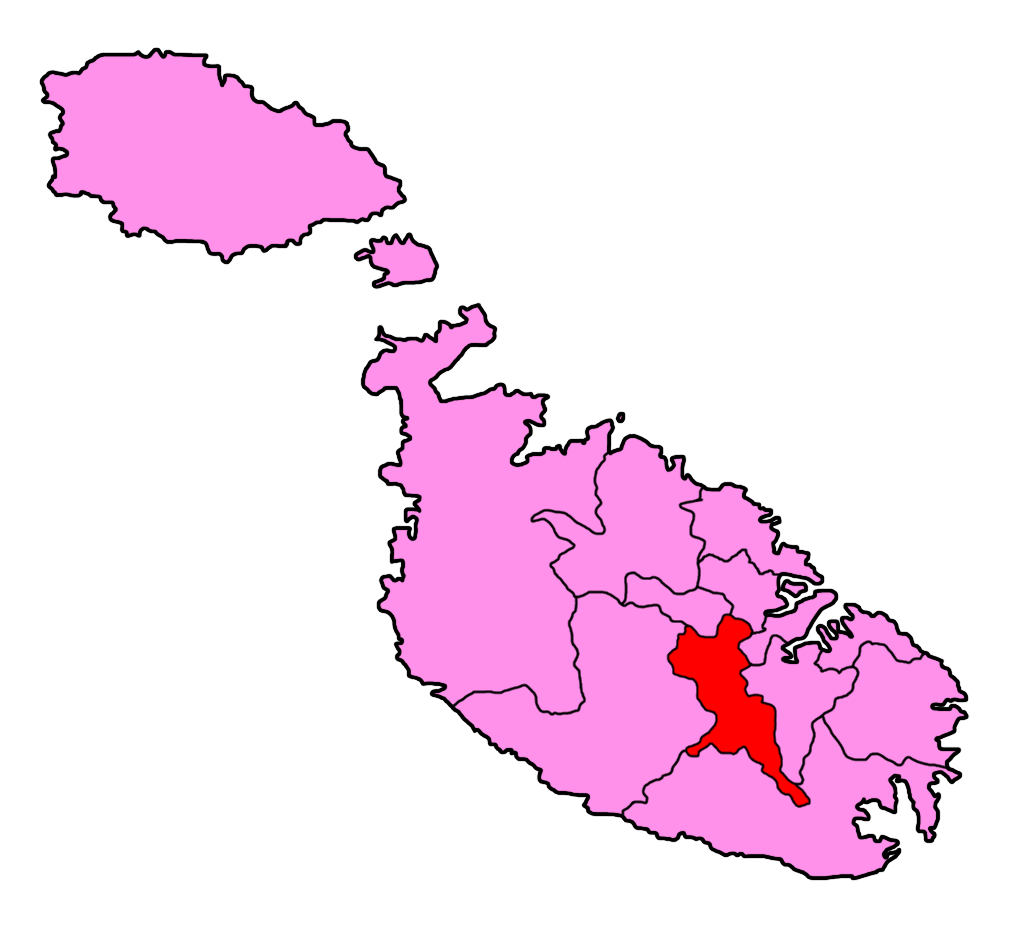
- District within Malta

Current constituency
- Created: 1921
- Seats: 5

District 6 is an electoral district in Malta. It was established in 1921. Its boundaries have changed many times but it currently consists of the localities of Luqa, Qormi, Siġġiewi and part of Żebbuġ.

== Representatives ==
Election	Representatives				
1921	Francesco Buhagiar (UPM)	Gerald Strickland (Conservative)	Luigi Borg (UPM)	Walter Salamone (Conservative)	4 seats 1921–1935
1924	Francesco Buhagiar (UPM)	John Bugeja (Conservative)	Salvatore Zammit Hammet (Labour)	Walter Salamone (Conservative)	4 seats 1921–1935
1927	Roger Strickland (Conservative)	John Bugeja (Conservative)	Tommaso Fenech (Nationalist)	Walter Salamone (Conservative)	4 seats 1921–1935
1932	Rosario Mizzi (Nationalist)	John Bugeja (Conservative)	Tommaso Fenech (Nationalist)	Walter Salamone (Conservative)	4 seats 1921–1935
District suspended
1947	Gerard Cassar (Labour)	Joseph Schembri (Labour)	Robert Bencini (Labour)	Albert V. Hyzler (DAP)	F.W. Maempel (Nationalist)
1950	Joseph B. Flores (Labour)	Joseph Schembri (Labour)	Leli E.C. Tabone (Labour)	Giuseppe Maria Camilleri (Nationalist)	Tom. Caruana Demajo (Nationalist)
1951	E.C. Tabone (Labour)	Joseph Flores (Labour)	Albert Victor Hyzler (Workers')	Giuseppe Maria Camilleri (Nationalist)	Tom. Caruana Demajo (Nationalist)
1953	Emanuel C. (Leli) Tabone (Labour)	Joseph Flores (Labour)	Albert V. Hyzler (DAP)	Giuseppe Maria Camilleri (Nationalist)	Tom. Caruana Demajo (Nationalist)
1955	Albert Hyzler (Labour)	Joseph Flores (Labour)	Emmanuel C. (Leli) Tabone (Labour)	Giuseppe Maria Camilleri (Nationalist)	Tom. Caruana Demajo (Nationalist)
1962	Mike Pulis (Labour)	Emidio Caruana (CWP)	Emanuele Agius (Nationalist)	Guzi Spiteri (Nationalist)	Tom. Caruana Demajo (Nationalist)
1966	Evelyn Bonaci (Labour)	Kalcidon Agius (Labour)	Frans Dingli (Nationalist)	Guzi Spiteri (Nationalist)	Paolo Borg Olivier (Nationalist)
1971	Evelyn Bonaci (Labour)	Kalcidon Agius (Labour)	Edward Fenech Adami (Nationalist)	Joseph E. Spiteri (Nationalist)	Paolo Borg Olivier (Nationalist)
1976	Guze (Joseph) Abela (Labour)	Philip Muscat (Labour)	Carmelo Brincat (Labour)	Gius. Maria Camilleri (Nationalist)	George Hyzler (Nationalist)
1981	Lino Spiteri (Labour)	Philip Muscat (Labour)	Philip Sciberras (Labour)	Joe A. Grima (Nationalist)	George Hyzler (Nationalist)
1987	Lino Spiteri (Labour)	Philip Muscat (Labour)	John Attard Montalto (Labour)	Michael Bonnici (Nationalist)	George Hyzler (Nationalist)
1992	Lino Spiteri (Labour)	Philip Muscat (Labour)	John Attard Montalto (Labour)	Charles Mangion (Labour)	George Hyzler (Nationalist)
1996	Lino Spiteri (Labour)	John Dalli (Nationalist)	John Attard Montalto (Labour)	Charles Mangion (Labour)	George Hyzler (Nationalist)
1998	Marie Louise Coleiro (Labour)	John Dalli (Nationalist)	John Attard Montalto (Labour)	Charles Mangion (Labour)	George Hyzler (Nationalist)
2003	Marie Louise Coleiro (Labour)	John Dalli (Nationalist)	John Attard Montalto (Labour)	Charles Mangion (Labour)	Clyde Puli (Nationalist)
2008	Marie Louise Coleiro (Labour)	John Dalli (Nationalist)	Roderick Galdes (Labour)	Charles Mangion (Labour)	Clyde Puli (Nationalist)
2013	Marie Louise Coleiro (Labour)	Ryan Callus (Nationalist)	Roderick Galdes (Labour)	Charles Mangion (Labour)	Clyde Puli (Nationalist)
2017	Robert Abela (Labour)	Ryan Callus (Nationalist)	Roderick Galdes (Labour)	Rosianne Cutajar (Labour)	Clyde Puli (Nationalist)
2022	Silvio Schembri (Labour)	Ryan Callus (Nationalist)	Roderick Galdes (Labour)	Rosianne Cutajar (Labour)	Jerome Caruana Cilia (Nationalist)
