= Joseph Cefai =

Joseph Cefai (also known as Giuseppi Cefai) (October 28, 1921 – June 18, 1996) was a Gozitan politician, administrator and civil servant in Malta. Along with other prominent Gozitans, Cefai was known for his promotion of the interests of the island of Gozo where he was born on October 28, 1921. Cefai had his education at the Gozo Seminary, the Gozo Lyceum and subsequently at the then Royal University of Malta where he graduated Diploma of Legal Procurator in 1943.

In 1947, together with other prominent Gozitans including Francesco Masini, he stood as candidate in the elections in the name of the newly founded Gozo Party and was elected member of the Legislative Assembly. During that legislature Cefai was active in the defence and promotion of Gozitan interests.

Cefai remained a member of that legislature till the dissolution of the same in June 1950. In 1950 Cefai contested the elections for the Legislative Assembly with the Malta Workers Party of Dr Paul Boffa and was elected. Cefai served the whole term until the Parliament was dissolved in 1953.

In 1956 Cefai entered the public service occupying several posts in Gozo in the public service. Cefai retired from the public service in 1981.

In February 1973, Cefai was nominated by the Government as Assistant Secretary for Gozo Affairs and subsequently in 1974 he was nominated for Secretary of Gozo Affairs, a post which he continued to occupy till 1981.

Cefai was awarded the Coronation Medal in 1953 and in June 1996 on the occasion of the Sette Giugno commemoration he was awarded the honour of Gieh ir Repubblika.

Cefai died on June 18, 1996, at his home in Victoria, Gozo.

== See also ==
- Gozo
- Sir Paul Boffa
- Sette Giugno

Information is available as public record in Malta.
