= Exclusive economic zone of Malta =

Proposed economic zone exclusive to Malta

The Exclusive Economic Zone of Malta is defined by the Exclusive Economic Zone Act enacted in 2021.

On 12 June 2021 Clyde Caruana, Minister of Finance and Employment, proposed an exclusive economic zone for Malta. Caruana stated that an exclusive economic zone could hold economic potential for "fisheries, artificial islands, wind farms, solar farms, wave-generated electricity and revenue from shipping movements."

== See also ==
- Geography of Malta
