= District 9, Malta =

Electoral district in Malta

District 9
- Parliament of Malta constituency
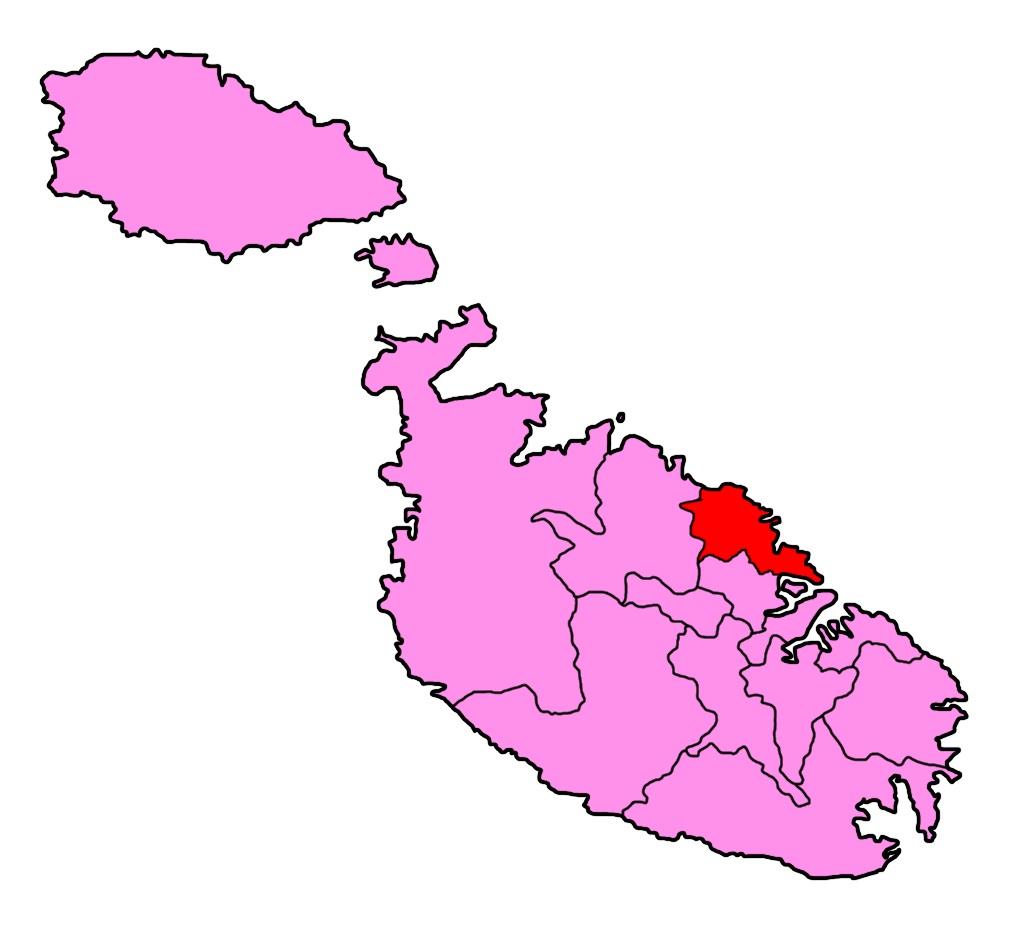
- District within Malta

Current constituency
- Created: 1962
- Seats: 5

District 9 is an electoral district in Malta. It was established in 1962. Its boundaries have changed many times but it currently consists of the localities of Għargħur, Msida, San Ġwann, Swieqi and Ta' Xbiex.

== Representatives ==
| Election | Representatives | | | | |
|---|---|---|---|---|---|
| 1962 | Paul Xuereb (Labour) | Daniel Micallef (CWP) | John Muscat (Nationalist) | Nicola Muscat (Nationalist) | Salvatore Abela (Nationalist) |
| 1966 | Paul Xuereb (Labour) | Freddie Micallef (Labour) | John Muscat (Nationalist) | Ferdinand Galea (Nationalist) | Sammy Abela (Nationalist) |
| 1971 | Paul Xuereb (Labour) | Alfred (Freddie) Micallef (Labour) | John Muscat (Nationalist) | Carm Lino Spiteri (Nationalist) | Lawrence Gatt (Nationalist) |
| 1976 | Patrick Holland (Labour) | Robert Naudi (Labour) | Censu Tabone (Nationalist) | George Bonello Du Puis (Nationalist) | John Rizzo Naudi (Nationalist) |
| 1981 | Leo Brincat (Labour) | Robert Naudi (Labour) | Censu Tabone (Nationalist) | Michael Falzon (Nationalist) | John Rizzo Naudi (Nationalist) |
| 1987 | Leo Brincat (Labour) | Dennis Sammut (Labour) | Francis Zammit Dimech (Nationalist) | Michael Falzon (Nationalist) | John Rizzo Naudi (Nationalist) |
| 1992 | Leo Brincat (Labour) | Tony Nicholl (Labour) | John Vella (Nationalist) | Michael Falzon (Nationalist) | John Rizzo Naudi (Nationalist) |
| 1996 | Leo Brincat (Labour) | Adrian Vassallo (Labour) | John Vella (Nationalist) | Joe Borg (Nationalist) | Francis Zammit Dimech (Nationalist) |
| 1998 | Leo Brincat (Labour) | Adrian Vassallo (Labour) | John Vella (Nationalist) | Joe Borg (Nationalist) | Francis Zammit Dimech (Nationalist) |
| 2003 | Leo Brincat (Labour) | Adrian Vassallo (Labour) | Michael Frendo (Nationalist) | George Pullicino (Nationalist) | Francis Zammit Dimech (Nationalist) |
| 2008 | Leo Brincat (Labour) | Robert Arrigo (Nationalist) | Michael Frendo (Nationalist) | George Pullicino (Nationalist) | Francis Zammit Dimech (Nationalist) |
| 2013 | Leo Brincat (Labour) | Robert Arrigo (Nationalist) | Emanuel Mallia (Labour) | George Pullicino (Nationalist) | Simon Busuttil (Nationalist) |
| 2017 | Clifton Grima (Labour) | Robert Arrigo (Nationalist) | Emanuel Mallia (Labour) | Marthese Portelli (Nationalist) | Kristy Debono (Nationalist) |
| 2022 | Rebecca Buttigieg (Labour) | Ivan J Bartolo (Nationalist) | Randolph De Battista (Labour) | Karol Aquilina (Nationalist) | Graziella Attard Previ (Nationalist) |
