= Chief of Staff to the Prime Minister (Malta) =

Political office in Malta

Chief of Staff of Staff
- Kap tas-Segretarjat tal-Uffiċċju tal-Prim Ministru
- Office of the Prime Minister of Malta
- Reports to: Prime Minister
- Appointer: Prime Minister
- Website: Office of the Prime Minister of Malta

The Chief of Staff of the Prime Minister of Malta, officially called Head of Secretariat of the Office of the Prime Minister of the Republic of Malta, is the most senior political appointee in the Office of the Prime Minister of Malta. The chief of staff is appointed by the prime minister as its senior aid. This position acts as the principal advisor to the prime minister and it coordinates the work action of the different departments of the government.

== History ==
Richard Cachia Caruana occupied the position under Eddie Fenech Adami until his appointment as Permanent Representative of Malta to the European Union. It was worth mentioning that a notorious attempt at assassinating Cachia Caruana was carried out in 1994 when he was stabbed close to his home in Mdina.

The chief of staff to Lawrence Gonzi, Edgar Galea Curmi, was asked to resign by then Leader of the Opposition (Malta), Joseph Muscat, after calling the police commissioner regarding a case involving Cyrus Engerer's father which was feared to be politically motivated. Lawrence Gonzi reiterated that the Galea Curmi did the right thing to ensure that the case was not politically motivated. Galea Curmi was later on claimed to have been earning over the pay grade at the time.

Upon his election as prime minister, Joseph Muscat made Keith Schembri his chief of staff. He was put under scrutiny for originating from a business background. Keith Schembri was reconfirmed as chief of staff further to the 2017 Maltese general election.

Schembri resigned on November 26, 2019. On the same day, his deputy Mark Farrugia was made chief of staff.

Further to Robert Abela's swearing in, economist Clyde Caruana was selected as chief of staff. Upon being co-opted to parliament, Clyde Caruana confirmed that he would keep the post of chief of staff. On November 21, 2020, a cabinet reshuffle was announced by the Prime Minister, handing Clyde Caruana the role of minister of finance and employment. Eventually, news portal Lovin Malta rumoured that Glenn Micallef, a European Union policy advisor to the prime minister, was to replace Clyde Caruana.

== List of chiefs of staff ==
Political parties

Nationalist Party (PN)
Labour Party (PL)

No.	Portrait	Name (Birth–Death)	Term of office			Political party	Prime Minister	Ref.
No.	Portrait	Name (Birth–Death)	Took office	Left office	Time in office	Political party	Prime Minister	Ref.
1		Richard Cachia Caruana (born 1955)	1991	27 October 1996	5 years, 300 days	Nationalist Party	Eddie Fenech Adami	
2		Joseph Borg	28 October 1996	6 September 1998	1 year, 313 days	Labour Party	Alfred Sant	
(1)		Richard Cachia Caruana (born 1955)	7 September 1998	5 May 2004	5 years, 241 days	Nationalist Party	Eddie Fenech Adami	
3		Edgar Galea Curmi	6 May 2004	10 March 2013	8 years, 308 days	Nationalist Party	Lawrence Gonzi	
4		Keith Schembri (born 1975)	11 March 2013	26 November 2019	6 years, 260 days	Labour Party	Joseph Muscat	
5		Mark Farrugia	26 November 2019	13 January 2020 (Till the PMs resignation)	48 days	Labour Party	Joseph Muscat	
6		Clyde Caruana (born 1985)	13 January 2020	23 November 2020	315 days	Labour Party	Robert Abela	
7		Glenn Micallef (born 1989)	24 November 2020	26 June 2024	3 years, 215 days	Labour Party	Robert Abela	
8		Mark Mallia	26 June 2024	Incumbent	2 years, 149 days	Labour Party	Robert Abela	

Chief of staff	Dates	Prime minister
Richard Cachia Caruana	1991 − October 27, 1996	Eddie Fenech Adami
Joseph Borg	October 28, 1996 − September 6, 1998	Alfred Sant
Richard Cachia Caruana	September 7, 1998 − May 5, 2004	Eddie Fenech Adami
Edgar Galea Curmi	May 6, 2004 − March 10, 2013	Lawrence Gonzi
Keith Schembri	March 11, 2013 − November 26, 2019	Joseph Muscat
Mark Farrugia	November 26, 2019 − January 13, 2020	Joseph Muscat
Clyde Caruana	January 13, 2020 − November 23, 2020	Robert Abela
Glenn Micallef	November 24, 2020 − June 26, 2024	Robert Abela
Mark Mallia	June 26, 2024 -	Robert Abela
