= Marius Vaščega =

Lithuanian lawyer and economist (born 1977)

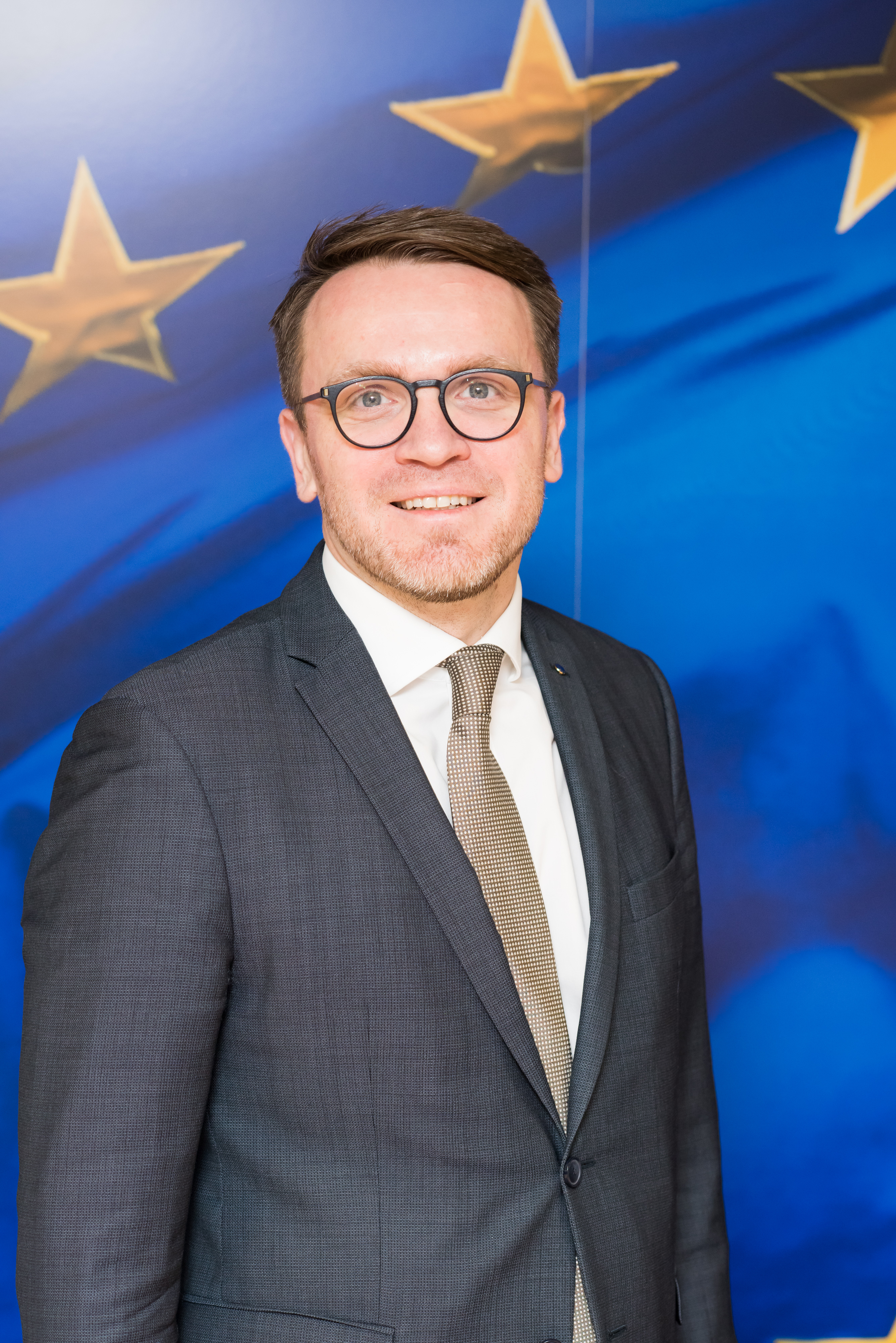
- Head of the European Commission's Representation in Vilnius
- Born: 20 December 1977 (age 48)
- Education: Vilnius University, Erasmus University Rotterdam, Complutense University of Madrid
- Occupations: Lawyer and economist
- Organization: European Commission

Marius Vaščega (born 20 December 1977) is a Lithuanian lawyer and economist and a long-standing official of the European Union institutions.

Vaščega was appointed head of the European Commission's Representation in Vilnius in December 2021, and began the role on 1 March 2022. He served in the role until 30 June 2026, acting as the official representative of the European Commission in Lithuania under the political authority of President Ursula von der Leyen. Shortly after taking up the post, he met with President Gitanas Nausėda to discuss the EU's response to the war in Ukraine, sanctions policy, and reducing energy dependence on Russia. He was succeeded as Head of Representation by Rytis Martikonis.

Earlier 2019 December - 2022 February He was the head of the cabinet of Virginijus Sinkevičius, the European Commissioner for the Environment, Oceans, and Fisheries.

== Public engagement ==
As Head of Representation, Vaščega regularly represented the Commission in Lithuania on subjects including EU sanctions policy, energy security, trade, recovery funding, climate targets, and digital regulation. He was also a frequent media commentator on sanctions, EU funds, EU-China relations, and energy independence, and an opinion contributor on European economic security, EU foreign affairs, and support for Ukraine. He spoke at public forums spanning digital policy, economics, transport, culture, healthcare, agriculture, and academia, including LOGIN, Lithuanian Davos, and the Leonidas Donskis Conference on disinformation and historical memory.

In May 2026, under his leadership, the Representation initiated and unveiled the "Unity Fort" mural in Vilnius — the first in a planned series of EU-themed street art across Lithuanian cities — marking Europe Day alongside visiting Commissioner Glenn Micallef.

In September 2025 he personally received Mikalai Khilo, a Belarusian EU staffer freed after imprisonment in Belarus, at the Vilnius Representation.

== Biography ==
Vaščega was born in Panevėžys, the fifth largest city in Lithuania, where he was raised and graduated from Juozas Balčikonis Gymnasium.

Vaščega graduated from Vilnius University with a master's degree in Law. Marius also studied at Erasmus University Rotterdam, the University of Hamburg, the Complutense University of Madrid and the Complutense University of Madrid, where he obtained a master's degree in law and economics, and the CERIS – Diplomatic School of Brussels (formerly the Centre Européen de Recherches Internationales et Stratégiques), which granted him a master's degree in International Politics.

He started a professional career as a lawyer in Lithuania, where he also taught at the Faculty of Law at Vilnius University.

Since 2004, Vaščega has been an official of the European institutions, worked at the Council of the European Union in Brussels, where he advised ten EU Presidencies and worked in the European Parliament.

From 2014 until 2018, he worked as an economic policy officer of the European Commission in Lithuania. In the period between 2018 and 2019 he worked as the Deputy Head of the European Commission Representation in Lithuania and Head of the Policy Department.

Vaščega is active in the media on European topics and is also the author of scientific articles and commentaries.

He is a fluent user of Lithuanian, English, French and Russian languages and also speaks Spanish and German.

== Personal life ==
In a 2024 profile interview, Vaščega said he might have continued practising law in Lithuania had the country not joined the EU in 2004, and described how he chose to specialise in EU law, going on to study in Rotterdam, Madrid, and Hamburg. In the same interview, he said running has been one of his main ways of clearing his head since his student years, and that he has completed half-marathons, the Stockholm Marathon, and the original Marathon-to-Athens course in Greece, totalling around 1,600 kilometres of running in one year; he also cycles, having formed a cycling team with colleagues.

== Membership ==
Vaščega was elected Vice-Chairman of the executive board of the Lithuanian Lawyers' Association (Lietuvos teisininkų draugija) in March 2019, and was elected Chairman of the association in April 2025 for a 2025–2028 term. He previously chaired the association's Brussels branch.
