= District 10, Malta =

Electoral district in Malta

District 10
- Parliament of Malta constituency
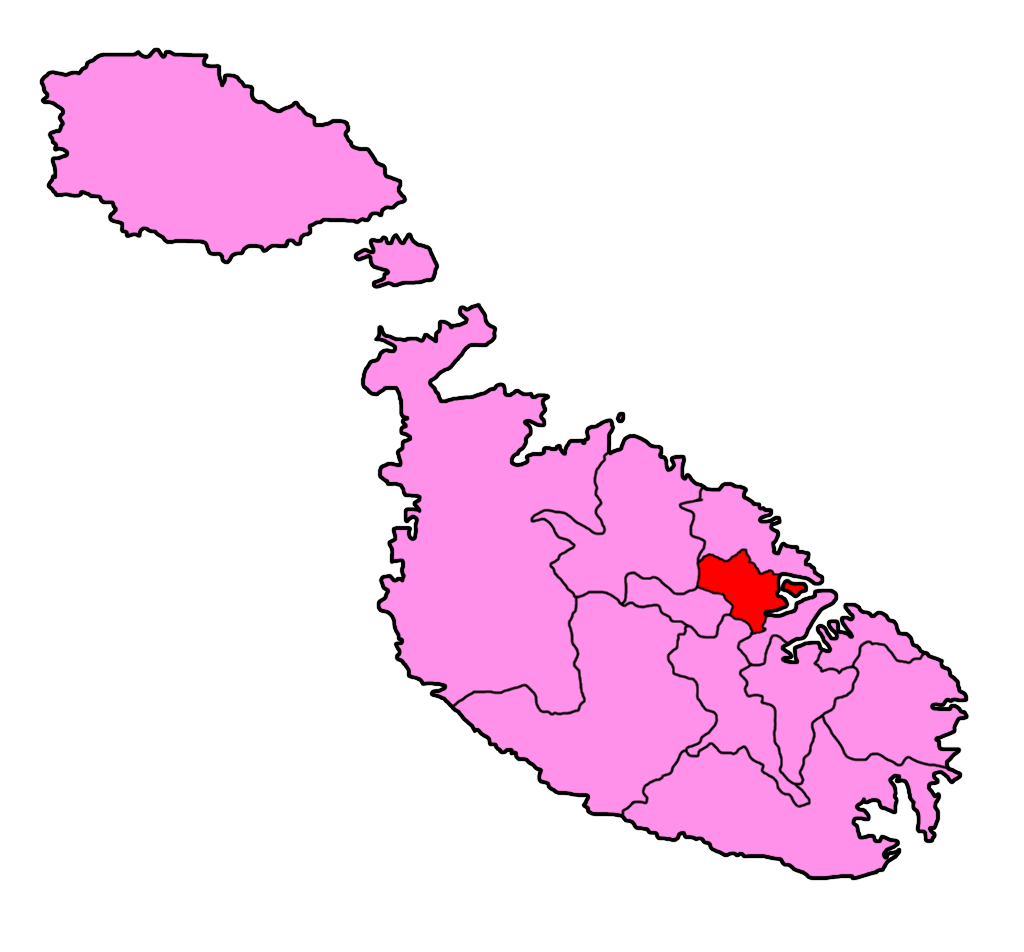
- District within Malta

Current constituency
- Created: 1962
- Seats: 5

District 10 is an electoral district in Malta. It was established in 1962. Its boundaries have changed many times but it currently consists of the localities of Gżira, Pembroke, St. Julian's, Sliema and part of Naxxar, and the hamlet of Baħar iċ-Cagħaq. From 1962 until 1971 the 10 District used to be composed of the island of Gozo. From that year onwards the number of districts increased from 10 to 13 and Gozo became the 13th district.

== Representatives ==
Election	Representatives				
1962	Carmelo Refalo (Nationalist)	Edgar Soler (DNP)	Coronato Attard (DNP)	Anton Tabone (Nationalist)	George Galea (Nationalist)
1966	Carmelo Refalo (Nationalist)	Kelinu Galea (Labour)	Coronato Attard (DNP)	Anton Tabone (Nationalist)	Amabile Cauchi (Nationalist)
1971	Angelo Camilleri (Labour)	Kelinu Galea (Labour)	Coronato Attard (DNP)	Anton Tabone (Nationalist)	Amabile Cauchi (Nationalist)
1976	Joseph M. Baldacchino (Labour)	Salvu Privitera (Labour)	Mario Felice (Nationalist)	Michael Falzon (Nationalist)	Michael Refalo (Nationalist)
1981	Alex Sceberras Trigona (Labour)	Patrick Holland (Labour)	George Bonello Du Puis (Nationalist)	John Vella (Nationalist)	Michael Refalo (Nationalist)
1987	Alex Sceberras Trigona (Labour)	Tony Nicholl (Labour)	Censu Tabone (Nationalist)	Michael Frendo (Nationalist)	Michael Refalo (Nationalist)
1992	Evarist (Varist) Bartolo (Labour)	George Bonello Du Puis (Nationalist)	Francis Zammit Dimech (Nationalist)	Michael Frendo (Nationalist)	Michael Refalo (Nationalist)
1996	Evarist (Varist) Bartolo (Labour)	George Pullicino (Nationalist)	Guido de Marco (Nationalist)	Michael Frendo (Nationalist)	Michael Refalo (Nationalist)
1998	Joseph Cuschieri (Labour)	George Pullicino (Nationalist)	Guido de Marco (Nationalist)	Michael A. Refalo (Nationalist)	Dolores Cristina (Nationalist)
2003	Joseph Cuschieri (Labour)	George Pullicino (Nationalist)	Evarist Bartolo (Labour)	Francis Zammit Dimech (Nationalist)	Dolores Cristina (Nationalist)
2008	Joseph Cuschieri (Labour)	George Pullicino (Nationalist)	Evarist Bartolo (Labour)	Francis Zammit Dimech (Nationalist)	Dolores Cristina (Nationalist)
2013	Michael Falzon (Labour)	Albert Fenech (Nationalist)	Evarist Bartolo (Labour)	Francis Zammit Dimech (Nationalist)	Karl Gouder (Nationalist)
2017	Michael Falzon (Labour)	Karol Aquilina (Nationalist)	Evarist Bartolo (Labour)	Marlene Farrugia (Democratic)	Karl Gouder (Nationalist)
2022	Michael Falzon (Labour)	Joe Giglio (Nationalist)	Clifton Grima (Labour)	Albert Buttigieg (Nationalist)	Graham Bencini (Nationalist)

== Last Election ==
2017 general election: District 10 - 5 seats
Party	Candidate	FPv%	Count																															
Party	Candidate	FPv%	1	2	3	4	5	6	7	8	9	10	11	12	13	14	15	16	17	18	19	20	21	22	23	24	25	26	27	28				
Nationalist	Robert Arrigo	20.6	4793																															
Labour	Evarist Bartolo	11.7	2732	2734	2735	2735	2758	2758	2760	2783	2785	2786	2819	2858	2858	2858	2858	2858	2937	2985	2985	2986	2987	2987	2987	2988	3198	3204	3648	3656	3666	3671	3671	4793
Labour	Michael Falzon	9.7	2260	2261	2261	2263	2270	2270	2276	2287	2287	2287	2310	2340	2343	2343	2343	2344	2381	2384	2386	2386	2387	2388	2388	2388	2555	2556	2873	2874	2876	2878	2878	4045
Labour	Manuel Mallia	7.6	1777	1778	1779	1779	1783	1784	1784	1795	1795	1795	1815	1834	1834	1835	1835	1835	1898	1904	1904	1904	1906	1906	1906	1909	2064	2064	2359	2361	2361	2362	2362	
Nationalist	Karl Gouder	4.9	1132	1234	1234	1235	1235	1245	1245	1247	1256	1280	1280	1282	1294	1310	1343	1360	1362	1372	1412	1456	1527	1597	1696	1715	1715	1872	1872	2149	2575	3416	3483	3491
Nationalist	George Pullicino	4.7	1088	1184	1184	1185	1185	1192	1192	1192	1197	1202	1202	1202	1224	1235	1256	1291	1291	1296	1334	1363	1410	1455	1488	1503	1505	1560	1561	1986	2182	2592	2608	2612
Nationalist	Nick Refalo	4.5	1043	1096	1096	1096	1096	1103	1106	1107	1117	1124	1124	1125	1139	1161	1181	1199	1200	1211	1259	1364	1452	1498	1556	1569	1569	1718	1721	1945	2153			
Nationalist	Marlene Farrugia	4.4	1016	1135	1135	1137	1137	1147	1157	1157	1192	1201	1202	1202	1223	1255	1291	1327	1329	1354	1390	1449	1507	1616	1729	1756	1757	1933	1939	2202	3177	3970		
Nationalist	Dimech Zammit	4.1	948	1060	1060	1061	1061	1066	1069	1069	1071	1085	1085	1085	1097	1109	1131	1160	1160	1167	1192	1250	1301	1361	1414	1438	1440	1499	1499					
Labour	Manche` Borg	4	923	924	924	925	932	932	936	942	943	943	951	967	967	968	968	968	1005	1021	1021	1021	1021	1021	1023	1023	1124	1126						
Labour	Clifton Grima	2.4	549	550	550	550	558	558	561	566	566	566	575	600	600	600	600	600	636	645	645	645	645	645	645	645								
Nationalist	[Borg Borg	2.2	502	532	532	532	532	534	536	536	538	540	541	542	548	564	574	590	591	597	617	641	661	715	772	805	805							
Nationalist	Previ Attard	2	472	580	582	584	585	591	591	591	594	600	601	601	628	644	662	688	689	695	726	762	824	868	951	1440	1441	1622	1626	1883				
Nationalist	Wadge Abela	1.6	379	414	414	414	414	422	424	424	425	427	428	430	447	458	470	490	490	501	517	535	565	592	645									
Nationalist	Albert Buttigieg	1.6	378	406	406	407	407	409	412	412	424	427	427	428	430	441	454	461	461	467	475	483	495											
Nationalist	Christopher Sansone	1.6	368	389	389	390	390	393	394	394	398	405	406	406	411	414	424	432	432	434	448	475												
Nationalist	Jason Zammit	1.5	352	374	374	374	374	376	376	376	378	384	384	384	386	401	409	418	418	420	431													
Nationalist	Karol Aquilina	1.5	343	394	394	394	394	396	396	396	397	400	400	400	414	422	437	453	454	456	477	496	523	555										
Democratic Alternative (Malta)	Arnold Cassola	1.1	245	247	269	275	275	276	286	287	293	294	294	294	294	294	294	295	301															
Nationalist	Noel Muscat	1	243	261	261	261	261	263	263	264	266	278	278	278	285	295	304	313	313	314														
Labour	Alamango Zammit	0.9	210	210	210	210	210	210	211	233	233	235	246	276	276	277	277	277																
Nationalist	Fenech Muscat	0.8	197	215	215	216	217	220	220	220	224	228	228	228	234	243	252																	
Nationalist	Ray Bugeja	0.8	184	220	220	220	220	222	222	224	224	225	225	225	231	238																		
Nationalist	Brincat Vella	0.8	182	192	192	192	192	195	198	198	198	200	200	200	203																			
Nationalist	Wayne Hewitt	0.7	158	175	175	175	175	178	179	179	180	182	182	182																				
Labour	Sigmund Mifsud	0.6	149	149	149	149	150	150	151	151	151	151	170																					
Labour	Jean Micallef	0.5	117	117	117	117	124	124	124	129	129	129																						
Nationalist	Justin Fenech	0.4	103	112	112	112	112	114	114	114	114																							
Nationalist	Anthony Buttigieg	0.4	98	102	102	102	102	103	103	103																								
Labour	Marion Mizzi	0.4	90	90	90	90	95	95	95																									
Nationalist	Charles Selvaggi	0.3	79	87	87	87	87																											
Moviment Patrijotti Maltin	Fatima Hassanin	0.3	74	75	75	92	92	94																										
Labour	Mark Causon	0.3	66	66	66	66																												
Alleanza Bidla	Elizabeth Mikkelsen	0.2	41	41	41																													
Democratic Alternative (Malta)	Danika Formosa	0.1	28	28																														
Electorate: 26,460 Valid: 23,319 Spoilt: 266 Quota: 3,887 Turnout: 23,585 (89.1%)
