= Glenn Micallef =

Maltese civil servant

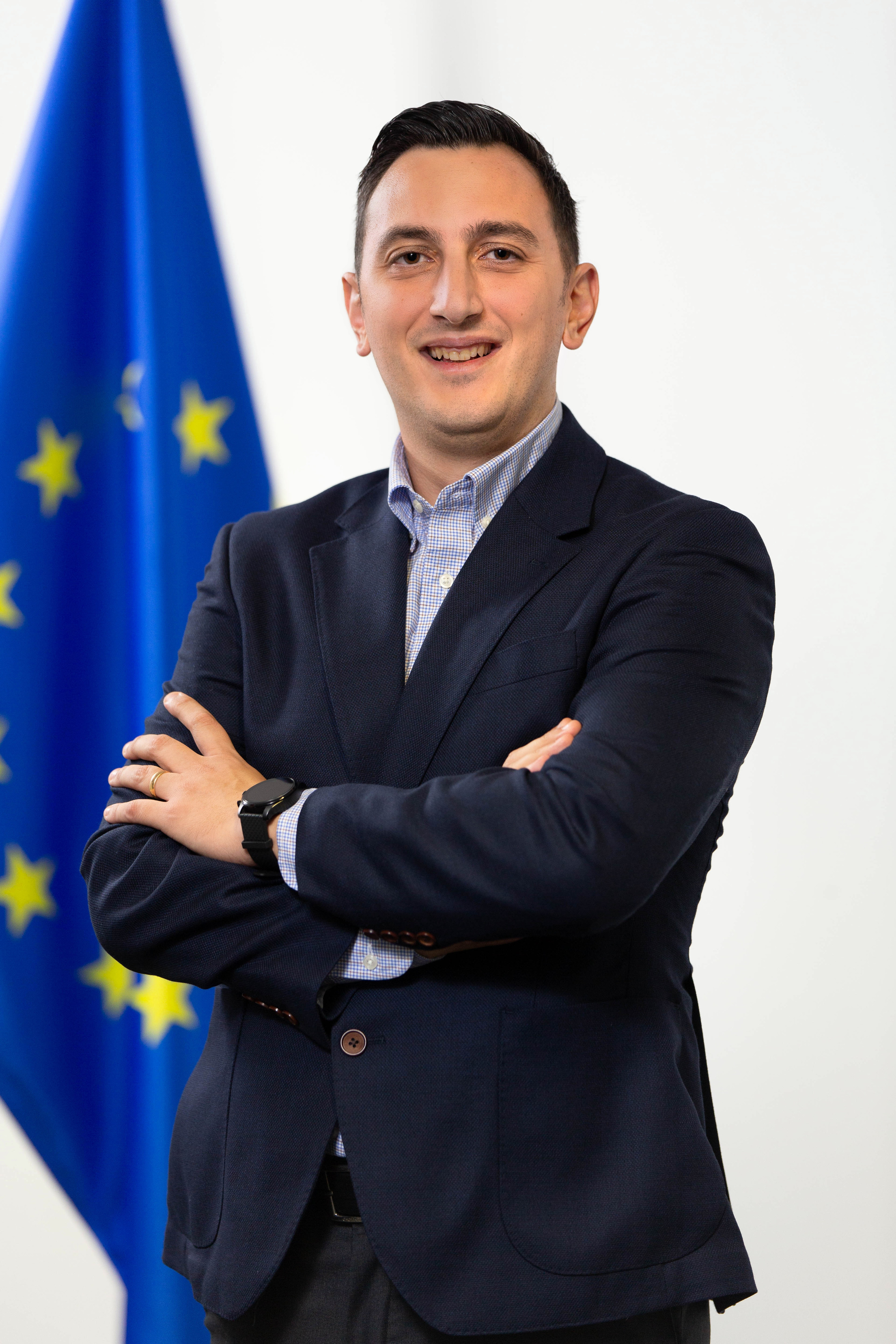
- Official portrait, 2024

European Commissioner for Intergenerational Fairness, Youth, Culture and Sport
- Incumbent
- Assumed office 1 December 2024
- Commission: Von der Leyen II
- Preceded by: Iliana Ivanova

Chief of Staff to the Prime Minister of Malta
- In office 22 November 2020 – 26 June 2024
- Prime Minister: Robert Abela
- Preceded by: Clyde Caruana
- Succeeded by: Mark Mallia

Personal details
- Born: Glenn Micallef; 30 July 1989 (age 37)
- Party: Labour Party
- Education: University of Malta
- Occupation: Civil servant • Politician

Glenn Micallef (Maltese pronunciation: [ˈɡlɛnː mɪˈkɐlːɛf]; born 30 July 1989) is a Maltese civil servant who was Chief of Staff to the Prime Minister of Malta, Robert Abela, from 2020 to 2024. Since December 2024 he has served as European Commissioner for Intergenerational Fairness, Youth, Culture and Sport.

== Early life ==
Micallef graduated from the University of Malta with a bachelor's degree in commerce and economics and a Masters degree in European law. As a student, he served as president of Pulse in 2010.

== Career ==
He later worked at the foreign affairs ministry, where he was head of the EU Coordination Department and the Brexit Unit. In January 2020, Micallef was named European affairs advisor to Prime Minister Robert Abela.

=== Brexit preparations ===
Following the UK's decision to leave the European Union and subsequent negotiations with the European Commission, Glenn Micallef was appointed as Head of the Brexit Unit, to coordinate Malta's Brexit preparations and to streamline Malta's legislation accordingly. The principal set of guidelines establishing the parameters for the Chief Negotiator were agreed upon and concluded during the 2017 Maltese Presidency of the Council of the European Union. Under his tenure, Micallef was also responsible for an information campaign, 'Brexit Be Prepared', to inform UK citizens living in Malta of the steps needed to regulate their position following Brexit and coordinate between the different government departments and entities.

=== Chief of staff ===
In November 2020, he was appointed Head of Secretariat to the Prime Minister, a position equivalent to a chief of staff, succeeding Clyde Caruana. He resigned from the position in June 2024, and was succeeded by Mark Mallia. Upon his resignation, Micallef was considered a contender to succeed Marlene Bonnici as Permanent Representative of Malta to the EU.

=== European Commissioner ===
In July 2024, he was announced as Malta's nominee to serve as the country's European commissioner. His hearing with the European Parliament took place on 4 November 2024.

== Personal life ==
Glenn Micallef was vice president of Zabbar St Patrick FC up until September 2024.

Micallef’s wife is an architect and is a local councillor in Kalkara.
