= Clifton Grima =

Maltese politician

Honourable Clifton Grima MP

Minister for Education, Youth, Sports, Research and Innovation
- In office 29 December 2021 – 4 June 2026
- Prime Minister: Robert Abela
- Preceded by: Justyne Caruana
- Succeeded by: Byron Camilleri

Minister for Justice
- Incumbent
- Assumed office 4 June 2026
- Preceded by: Jonathan Attard

Member of the Parliament of Malta for District 9
- In office 11 October 2016 – 26 March 2022
- Preceded by: Leo Brincat

Mayor of Msida
- In office 2009–2013
- Preceded by: Alexander Sciberras
- Succeeded by: Margaret Baldacchino Cefai

Member of the Parliament of Malta for District 10
- Incumbent
- Assumed office 26 March 2022 Serving with Robert Arrigo, Michael Falzon, Joe Giglio, and Mark Anthony Sammut

Personal details
- Party: Labour Party
- Education: University of Malta (LL.D.)

Clifton Grima is a Maltese politician for the Labour Party. A Member of the Parliament of Malta since 2016, Grima served as Minister for Education and Sport and, since June 2026, as Minister of Justice.

== Political career ==
In 2010, Grima graduated in Law from the University of Malta.

Grima was then elected as the mayor of Msida, serving as mayor from 2009 to 2013. He was later appointed by Joseph Muscat, the prime minister of Malta, to be the CEO of Mount Carmel Psychiatric Hospital.

In the 2013 Maltese general election, Grima, a member of the Labour Party, stood as a candidate for the Parliament of Malta in District 9. Grima was the penultimate candidate to be eliminated, receiving 1,646 votes. In 2016, following the resignation of District 9 incumbent Leo Brincat, Grima won the special election to succeed him in parliament. He was re-elected in the 2017 Maltese general election. During this term, Grima was one of several high-ranking Labour MPs who revolted against Muscat, who was embroiled in a corruption scandal.

In 2017, Grima served as parliamentary secretary in the Ministry for Education. He held this position until 2020, when he was appointed parliamentary secretary for sport.

On 29 December 2021, Grima was appointed Minister for Education and Sport by Prime Minister Robert Abela following the resignation of Justyne Caruana after an ethics scandal. Immediately after his appointment as minister, the investigative newspaper The Shift revealed that one of Grima's closest supporters, an official for a water polo team, had been suspended from his position for levying death threats against an official of the Aquatic Sports Association of Malta. During his time as minister, Grima promoted inclusivity in schools and opposed a proposal for mandatory COVID-19 vaccinations for children. Grima has also advocated for the restructuring of Malta's professional sports system, funding grassroots programs to train children in professional sports rather than hiring foreign athletes.

Grima was relected in the 2022 Maltese general election, this time from District 10.

He was relected again in the 2026 Maltese general election, following which he joined the third Robert Abela cabinet as Minister of Justice.

His third son, Giuseppe, was born in Spring 2026.
