= Ivan J Bartolo =

Maltese politician

Ivan J Bartolo MP

Member of the Parliament of Malta for District 9
- Incumbent
- Assumed office 2022

Personal details
- Party: Nationalist

Ivan J. Bartolo is a Maltese politician from the Nationalist Party. He was elected to the Parliament of Malta in the 2022 Maltese general election from District 9. He is the shadow digital society minister.

He served a short term in parliament in 2020 after replacing Marthese Portelli.

== See also ==
- List of members of the parliament of Malta, 2022–2027
