= Evelyn Bonaci =

Maltese politician (1916–2008)

The Honourable Evelyn Bonaci MP UOM

Member of Parliament for District 6
- In office 25 April 1966 – 9 November 1981

Personal details
- Born: 29 November 1916 Sliema, Crown Colony of Malta
- Died: 16 December 2008 (aged 92) Luqa, Malta
- Party: Labour
- Spouse: Louis Bonaci
- Children: 5
- Relatives: Cikku Bonaci (brother-in-law)

Evelyn Bonaci (29 November 1916 – 16 December 2008) was a Maltese politician who served in the Parliament of Malta from 1966 until 1976 as a member of the Labour Party. Bonaci co-founded the women's wing of the Labour Party.

== Biography ==
Evelyn Bonaci was born on 29 November 1916 in Sliema, Malta. Several members of her family were politicians associated with the Malta Labour Party: her husband Louis unsuccessfully ran for the Parliament of Malta in the 1953 and 1955 elections, while her brother-in-law, Cikku Bonaci, was an MP and government minister. In 1961, she co-founded the women's wing of the Labour Party along with Agatha Barbara. Bonaci later served as the president of the women's wing of the party branch in Birkirkara, and was a member of the Labour Party's national executive committee.

Bonaci unsuccessfully ran for parliament in the 1962 Maltese general election. She ran again in the 1966 election, and was elected to represent District 6. Bonaci was re-elected in the 1971 and 1976 elections. She was defeated in the 1981 election. Following her defeat, Bonaci remained active in the Labour Party; she ran again in the 1987 election, but was defeated. During her tenure, Bonaci was a member of the Maltese delegation to a conference of the Commonwealth of Nations. In 1995, Bonaci was named an "officer of the National Order of Merit".

Bonaci died in Luqa on 16 December 2008 at the age of 92. Members of both major parties expressed condolences, including Tonio Borg and Joseph Muscat of the Labour Party. The Labour Party stated that Bonaci was "an exemplary member of the party, known for her ethical respect towards political adversaries". Her funeral was held at St Helen's Basilica in Birkirkara.
