= Jerome Caruana Cilia =

Maltese politician (born 1989)

Honourable Jerome Caruana Cilia MP

Member of Parliament
- Incumbent
- Assumed office 7 May 2022
- Constituency: District 6

Personal details
- Born: 15 May 1989 (age 37)
- Party: Nationalist Party
- Education: Anglia Ruskin University; University of Leicester

Jerome Caruana Cilia MP (born 15 May 1989) is a Maltese politician and banker from the Nationalist Party. He was elected to the Parliament of Malta in the 2022 Maltese general election from District 6. He is the Shadow Finance Minister.

== Education ==
Caruana Cilia graduated with a Master of Arts in from the University of Leicester in 2016, and with a Master in Business Administration from Anglia Ruskin University in 2018.

== Career ==
Caruana Cilia previously worked as a Risk and Governance Manager with HSBC from 2014 until 2022. He is a visiting lecturer at IDEA College in Mosta. Caruana Cilia currently works as a Risk and Control Management and Data Protection Officer in a fintech institution.

== Political career ==
Jerome Caruana Cilia served as a member of the Ħal Qormi local council from 2012 to 2022.

Caruana Cilia was elected to Parliament in the 2022 Maltese general elections.

He was appointed the Shadow Minister for Finance in 2022. Caruana Cilia was later appointed Shadow Minister for the Economy and Enterprise in 2024.

In 2023, Caruana Cilia topped the list for most parliamentary questions asked for that legislature.

== See also ==
- List of members of the parliament of Malta, 2022–2027
