= Francesco Masini =

Maltese lawyer and politician

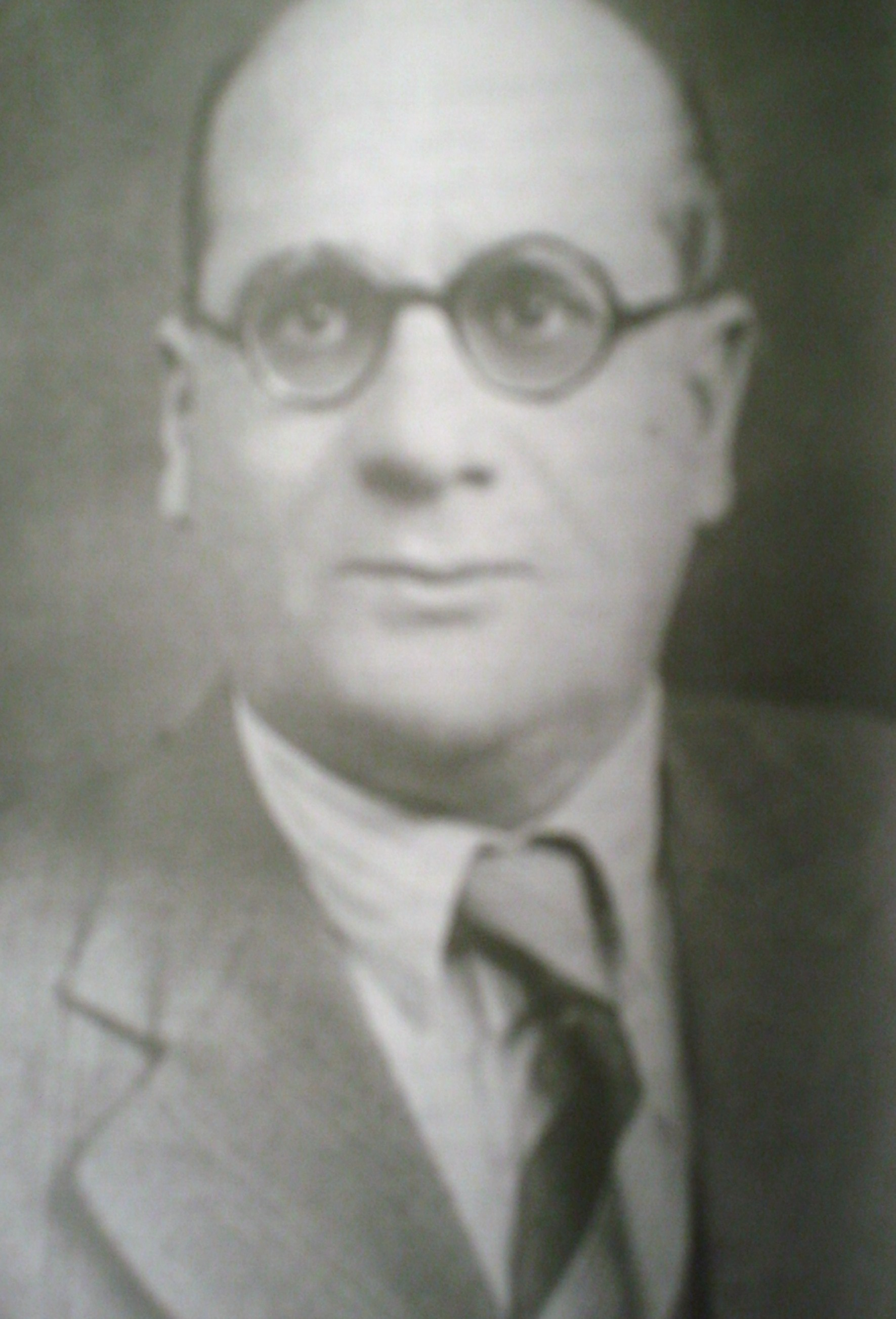
- Official Portrait
- In office 1947–1950

Personal details
- Born: 6 December 1894 Victoria, Gozo
- Died: 9 July 1962 (aged 67) Marsalforn, Gozo
- Party: Gozo Party (GP)
- Spouse: Elena "Lily" Grech

Francesco Masini (December 6, 1894 – July 9, 1962) was a lawyer and politician from the island of Gozo, Malta. In 1947, he founded the Gozo Party, and was elected to the Maltese Legislative Assembly together with two other party members.

== Early life and family ==
Francesco Masini was born in Victoria, Gozo, on December 6, 1894, son of Dr. Giuseppe Masini and Francesca née Calleja. Educated first at the Gozo Seminary, then at the University of Malta, he graduated Doctor of Laws on December 17, 1919. Soon after graduating, he started serving at the Gozo Law Courts, becoming one of the just three lawyers practicing at the time.

On July 11, 1926, Dr. Masini married Elena Grech, and had four children in all: Mary Rosaria (known as Rose), Joseph, Franco, and George.

== Foundation of the Gozo Party ==
=== Background ===
Following the chaos of the Second World War, Gozo was left in a state of disorder and abandonment. According to Gozitans themselves who complained in newspapers, "the standard of living in the Gozitan villages is low and the rate of infant mortality is high." Fear was growing among the Gozitan population that the new Self-Government Constitution which was to be given in 1947 was not going to be of benefit to Gozo, should no Gozitan members be elected.

Dr. Francesco Masini, being a prominent lawyer, was aware of these feelings, and the problems the Gozitan lower classes were having to face. He first teamed up with Dr. Anton Calleja, another lawyer, who in turn recruited Notary Joseph Cauchi, and legal prosecutors Joseph Cefai and Luigi Cutajar, as well as architect Carmelo Attard and hotelier Paul Portelli. On April 6, 1947, the Gozo Party was officially announced, and on June 28 of the same year, the first party gazette, Leħen Għawdex (Gozo's Voice) was published.

In the editorial of the Times of Malta dated 21 April 1947, Mabel Strickland said that "if the electorate of both Islands returns any one party to Power with only a narrow majority, it is understandable that Gozo is out to make its voice heard."

=== 1947 Election and period in the Legislative Assembly ===
In his political manifesto, as well as his speeches, Masini and his party focused on three main principles: Gozo as the main reason for which the party was founded; collaboration with the authorities and parliament as long as Gozitan interests are safeguarded and; independence which reassured that the Gozo Party was not affiliated with any other political party.

In the 1947 elections, held between October 25 and 27, the Gozo Party elected three of its members, Anton Calleja, Guzeppi Cefai, and Francesco Masini on the 8th District. Masini was the second candidate to be declared winner on the 8th District, after incumbent Henry Jones, founder of the Jones Party. In Parliament, the Party's work reflected Masini's principles. The party pressured Prime Minister Paul Boffa to set up an inquiry to report on the requirements of the island, which was set up on October 15, 1948. However, political developments led to the early demise of the Party as soon as Boffa’s government collapsed.

== Social involvement ==
Dr. Masini was active in several other organizations, especially the Leone Philharmonic Society, the National Festivities Committee, and the Gozo Public Library. He also headed a delegation that negotiated with the Bishop of Gozo (Joseph Pace) the donation of the statue of St. Mary by the Leone Philharmonic Society to the Cathedral of Gozo. He was also appointed as honorary member of the same club.

On April 14, 1961, Ordinance XI gave birth to the Gozo Civic Council. Masini served as a legal advisor till his death.

== Legacy ==
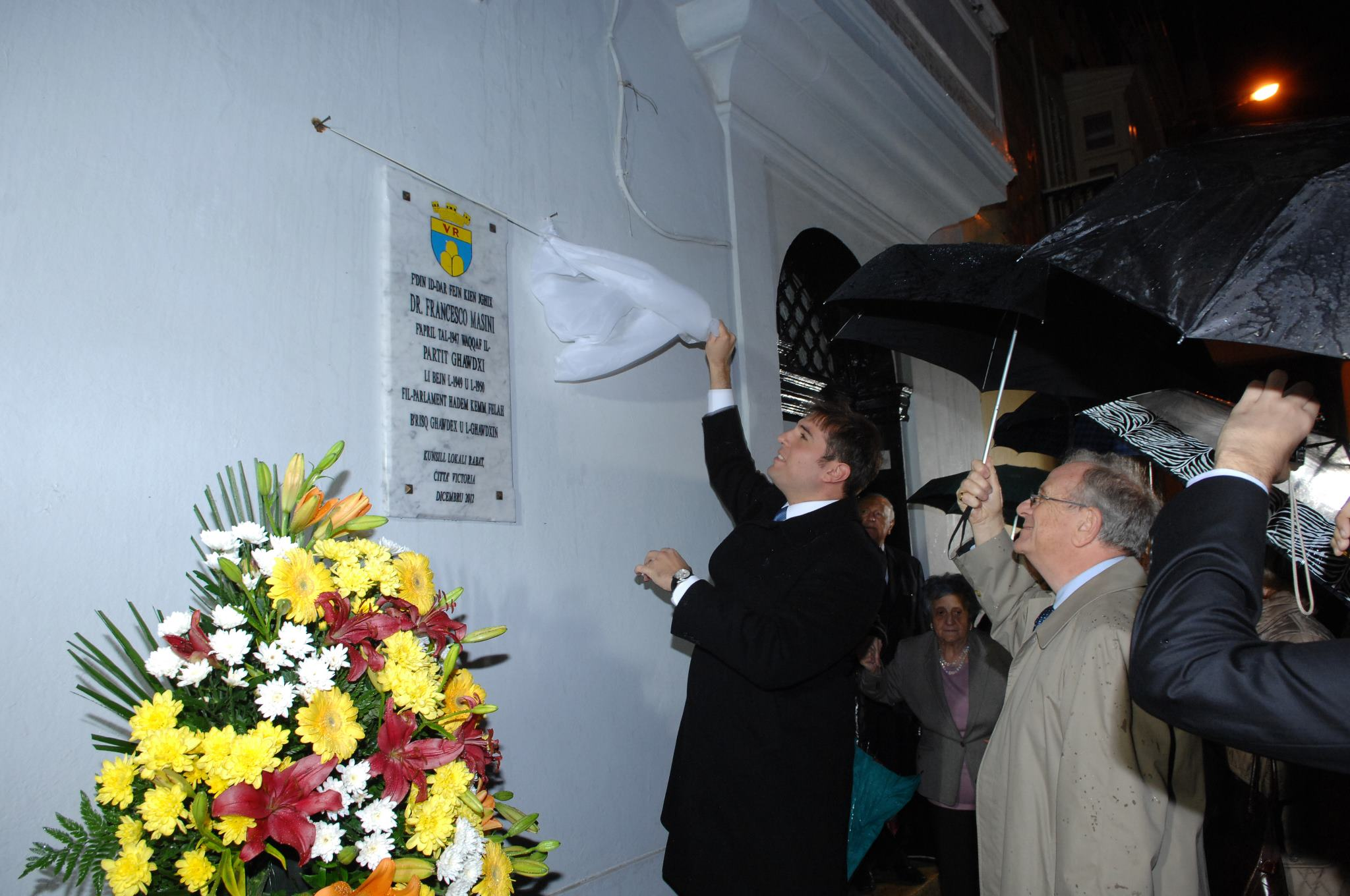
Plaque commemorating Dr. Masini at his family home in Victoria, Gozo.

A street in Victoria, Gozo, as well as a meeting room in the Teatru Aurora (the Leone Band Club's headquarters) are dedicated to him. His daughter, Rose received the "Ġieħ il-Parroċċa tal-Katidral" (Gozo Cathedral Parish Award) on behalf of her late father.

In December 2012, a plaque was unveiled at Masini's family home in Victoria, now residence of his daughter, in a ceremony attended by the mayor and members of the Masini family.
