= Leo Brincat =

Maltese politician

Leo Brincat (born 26 September 1949) is a Maltese politician, since 2016 member of the European Court of Auditors.

Brincat was first elected to Maltese parliament in 1982 as a member of the Malta Labour Party and was minister for finance and commerce between 1997 and 1998 and minister for sustainable development, the environment and climate change between 2013 and 2016, when he was nominated to the European Court of Auditors.

== Biography ==
Brincat was qualified as an associate of the Chartered Institute of Bankers, London, and later elected fellow of the same.

Brincat worked for 40 years in the banking sector, joining in 1966 Barclays Bank DCO, which subsequently became Barclays Bank International, Mid-Med Bank Ltd and HSBC Bank Malta plc, including as head of corporate research from 1998 until 2006. He later consulted businesses on internal financial controls and compliance until 2013.

Brincat was first elected to the Parliament of Malta for the Labour Party in 1982; he stayed as MP until 2016. From 1982 till 1997, Bricat also served as international secretary of the Labour Party, including as its representative at the Socialist International. in 1986-1987 Brincat was parliamentary secretary for housing in the Office of Prime Minister Karmenu Mifsud Bonnici, in the last year of his mandate.

In Alfred Sant's cabinet, Brincat served as Minister for Commerce in 1996-1997 and then for Finance and Commerce in 1997-1998.

In view of the 2003 referendum, Brincat campaigned along with the Labour Party against Malta's accession to the European Union.

In Joseph Muscat's cabinet, Brincat served as Minister for Sustainable Development, the Environment and Climate Change in 2013-2016.

In 2016, Muscat appointed Brincat as Malta's member of the European Court of Auditors, after the European Parliament had rejected his first choice, former deputy leader Toni Abela. Questioned by MEPs about his vote of confidence in favour of Konrad Mizzi, Brincat claimed having done so because his hands were "tied". Brincat obtained 11 votes in favour, 9 against and one abstention. In such a position, Brincat earns some €220,000 a year. he was succeeded in parliament by Clifton Grima.

Brincat was awarded in December 2017 by the Parliament of Malta as Officer of the National Order of Merit (Malta) (U.O.M). He also received an award in May 2019 by the St. Julian's Local Council.
