= Joe Giglio =

Maltese lawyer and politician

Honourable Joe Giglio MP

Member of the Parliament of Malta for District 9 and District 10
- Incumbent
- Assumed office 26 March 2022
- Preceded by: Multi-member constituency

Personal details
- Born: 1967 (age 58–59) Sliema, Malta
- Party: Nationalist Party
- Spouse: Jeannine Giglio
- Children: 4

Joseph Giglio is a Maltese lawyer and politician who has served in the Parliament of Malta since 2022, representing District 9 and District 10 as a member of the Nationalist Party. Giglio is the Shadow Minister for Justice, Research, and innovation. He was previously the Shadow Minister for Infrastructure and Capital projects. Giglio was briefly considered for leadership of the Nationalist Party against incumbent leader Bernard Grech in April 2022.

== Legal career ==
Joseph Giglio is one of Malta's leading lawyers. His area of speciality is criminal law, having worked in the field for almost 30 years.

He is a senior partner as well as a Director at a local legal company where he heads the criminal law Department that specialises in corporate and vicarious liability.

Giglio has been involved in numerous high profile cases, most notably a case involving corruption allegations against the Chief Justice, and another separate case of alleged fraud against the husband of former Minister of Gozo, Giovanna Debono. He also defended former Parliamentary Secretary Chris Said in a case of alleged perjury.

Joseph Giglio is also a lecturer in Criminal Law at the University of Malta. He is often invited to address various seminars and take part in talks focusing on criminal law. Through his legal experience, he provides his students with the necessary guidance, knowledge and insight to criminal proceedings, in order to enable them to be better prepared when they participate in criminal law moot court cases.

== Political career ==
Joseph Giglio has been a member of the Parliament of Malta since 2022 where he got elected with the highest number of votes in both District 9 and District 10. He previously served as Shadow Minister for Home Affairs.

A former lawyer for Pilatus Bank, Giglio came under controversy when, in a June 2022 interview, he criticized a whistleblower who had exposed a corruption scandal by Pilatus Bank in 2018;

Since June 2026, he is now serving as Shadow Minister for Justice, Research, and innovation.
