= 2017 Maltese Presidency of the Council of the European Union =

From January to June, third of a trio

Maltese Presidency of the Council of the European Union

- Logo of the 2017 Maltese presidency 1 January – 30 June 2017
- Council of the European Union
- Website: https://eu2017.mt

Presidency trio
- Netherlands; Slovakia; Malta

Malta held the presidency of the Council of the European Union during the first half of 2017. The presidency was the last of three presidencies making up a presidency trio, which began with the presidency of the Netherlands, followed by that of Slovakia. It was the first time Malta had held the presidency.

== Overview ==
The Maltese presidency began with a commitment to focus on six key areas of interest: (1) expanding the European single market, (2) fostering growth in the maritime sector, (3) helping neighbouring countries with their development, (4) implementing rules regarding asylum and immigration, (5) improving interstate cooperation regarding criminal justice and external borders, and (6) reducing social discrimination. The presidency was also tasked with dealing with the United Kingdom's exit from the European Union (Brexit), after the formal notification of the intent to withdraw was received in March.

After the family of Maltese prime minister Joseph Muscat faced a number of allegations in the wake of the Panama Papers scandal, Muscat opted to call a snap election a year before his term was scheduled to end. Although Muscat won the election, which was held in June, the decision to call an early election was not looked upon favourably by leaders in the European Union.

At the end of the term, Politico Europe remarked that the Maltese presidency "turned out to be rather good". The review gave the Maltese presidency full marks on the topic of Brexit, where the presidency kept the 27 countries negotiating against the United Kingdom unified, and on the topic of fisheries, where an agreement was made over a matter that had been open for more than a decade.

During a plenary session of the European Parliament in July, only a few dozen members showed up to review the Maltese presidency, leading European Commission president Jean-Claude Juncker to call the legislative body "ridiculous" for not giving the presidency of Malta, the smallest member state of the union, the same respect it would for those of larger countries.
