= Richard Cachia Caruana =

Maltese politician

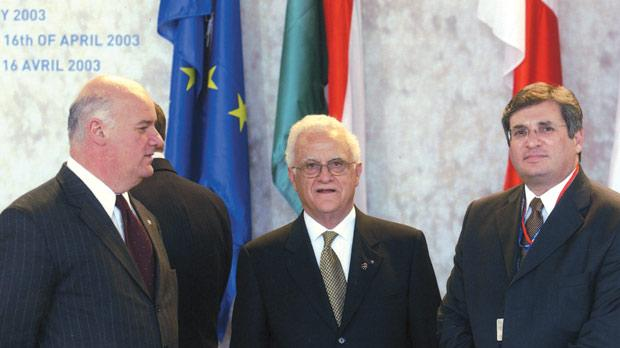
- Cachia Caruana (right) at the signing ceremony for the 2003 Treaty of Accession in Athens, pictured with Eddie Fenech Adami (centre) and then-Minister of Foreign Affairs Joe Borg (left)

Chief of Staff – Office of the Prime Minister
- In office 1991–1996
- Succeeded by: Joseph Borg

Chief of Staff – Office of the Prime Minister
- In office 1998–2004
- Preceded by: Joseph Borg
- Succeeded by: Edgar Galea Curmi

Permanent Representative of Malta to the European Union
- In office 2004–2012
- Succeeded by: Marlene Bonnici

Advisor on EU Affairs – Office of the Prime Minister
- In office 2004–2013
- Succeeded by: Neil Kerr

Richard Cachia Caruana KOM (born 11 February 1955) was a prominent office holder in the five Nationalist Party (European People's Party) governments in Malta between 1987 and 2013. He was chief negotiator for Malta's European Union accession negotiations (1999–2003) and later Malta's first permanent representative to the EU (2004–2012). He was chief of staff to Prime Minister Eddie Fenech Adami (1991–1996 and 1998–2004) and adviser to Prime Minister Lawrence Gonzi (2004–2013).

He is the chairman of Citco Custody Ltd, a financial institution, as well as a senior consultant at EMD Malta. He is a former director (and member of monetary policy council) of the Central Bank of Malta (1997–1998), and a former director of Air Malta plc (1992–1997) and the Malta Development Corporation (1987–1996). He is also a former senior consultant at KPMG Malta (1996–1998).

He was appointed a Companion of Malta's National Order of Merit (KOM) in 2006 and is also a member of the Orders of Merit of: Italy (Knight Grand Cross), Spain (Knight Commander), Latvia (Knight Commander), Estonia (Grand Officer), Poland (Knight Commander), Portugal (Grand Officer), and the Sovereign Military Order of Malta (Grand Officer).
