= Michael Falzon (politician, born 1945) =

Maltese politician (1945–2025)

Member of the Parliament of Malta for District 10
- In office 18 September 1976 – 23 September 1996

Personal details
- Born: 17 July 1945; Gżira, Crown Colony of Malta
- Died: 5 January 2025 (aged 79)
- Political party: PN
- Education: University of Malta
- Occupation: Architect

Michael Falzon (17 August 1945 – 5 January 2025) was a Maltese politician and architect. A member of the Nationalist Party, he served in the Parliament from 1976 to 1996.

Falzon died on 5 January 2025, at the age of 79.
