= Darren Carabott =

Maltese politician

Honourable Darren Carabott MP
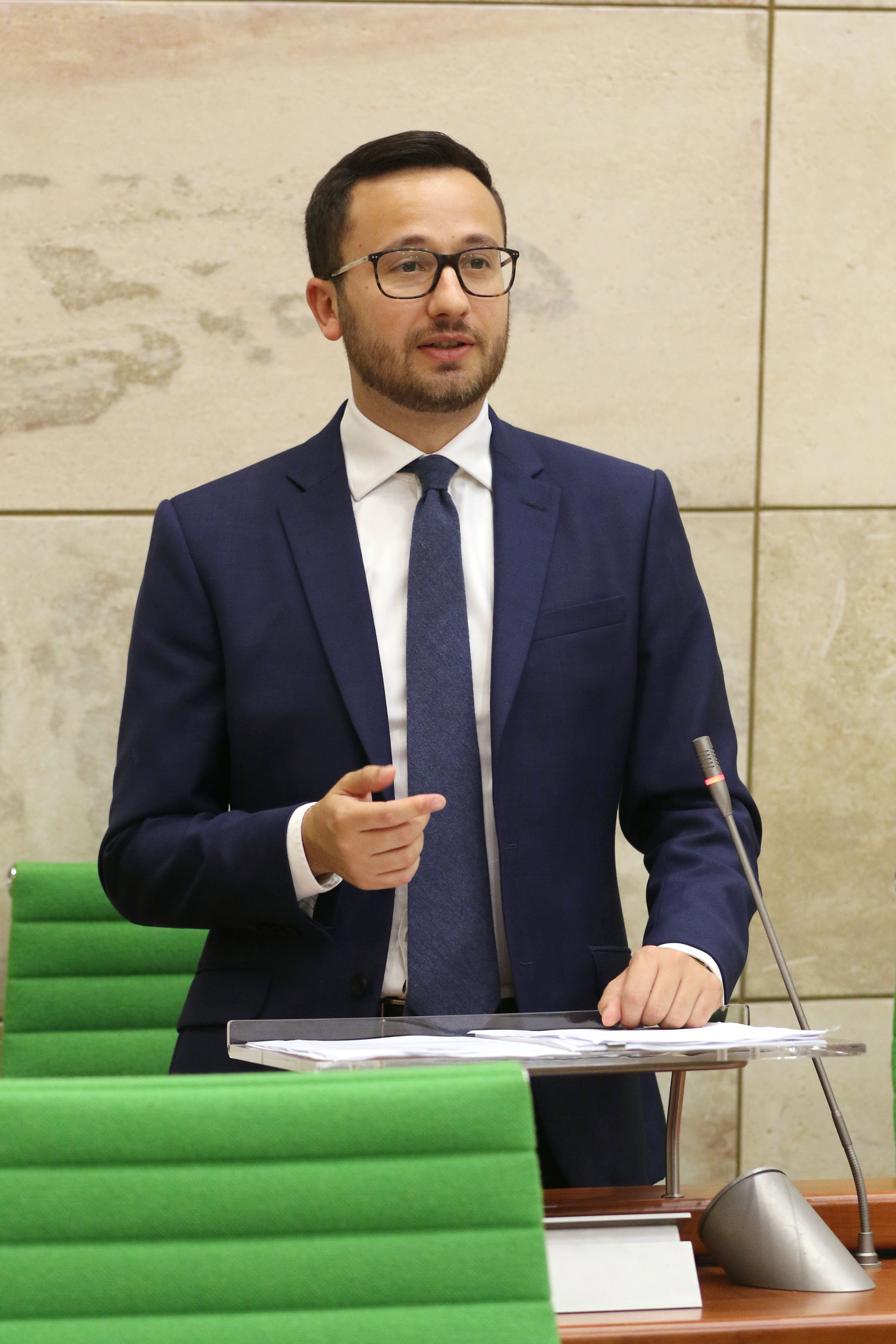
- Carabott in 2022

Member of Parliament
- Incumbent
- Assumed office 26 March 2022

President of Public Accounts Committee
- Incumbent
- Assumed office 26 March 2022
- Preceded by: Beppe Fenech Adami

Personal details
- Born: 13 January 1994 (age 32) Pietà, Malta
- Party: Nationalist Party
- Other political affiliations: European People's Party
- Spouse: Miriana Borg (m. 2025)
- Education: University of Malta; University for Peace
- Profession: Lawyer
- Committees: Public Accounts Committee; National Audit Office Accounts Committee
- Website: https://darrencarabott.mt/

Darren Carabott MP (born 13 January 1994) is a Maltese politician and lawyer serving as a Member of Parliament and as the President of Public Accounts Committee in the Parliament of Malta since March 2022.

Carabott was first elected to as a Member of the Parliament of Malta since his election in 2022, in which he successfully contested the First Electoral District in Malta as a candidate for the Partit Nazzjonalista.

== Family and personal life ==
Darren Carabott was born on 13 January 1994 in Pietà, and he grew up with his parents Jeffrey and Marthese and his older brother Karl in Santa Venera. He studied at St Augustine's College in Pietà, Ġ.F. Abela Junior College, and he graduated in law from the University of Malta in 2018. In 2019, Darren Carabott obtained his warrant to practice law in Malta.

In 2019, Carabott furthered his academic studies by reading for a Master of Laws in Transnational Crime & Justice, an international criminal and human rights law based programme in Turin (Italy) jointly organised by the United Nations mandated University for Peace (UPEACE), and the United Nations Interregional Crime & Justice Research Institute (UNICRI).

In October 2025, Carabott married Miriana Borg.

== Political career ==
In his student years, Darren Carabott was quite active and occupied numerous roles in a local student organisation SDM (Studenti Demokristjani Maltin) and also got involved in Partit Nazzjonalista's youth wing MŻPN (Moviment Żgħażagħ Partit Nazzjonalista). At the age of 16, Carabott also got involved in local politics where he joined the Partit Nazzjonalista local committee in Santa Venera. Carabott held the post of President for a number of years before submitting his resignation in order to contest the Maltese general elections. During his student years, Carabott was also a journalist and newscaster for NET News, a local media station owned by PN.

=== Local Councillor ===
On 17 April 2013, Carabott successfully contested the casual election to fill the vacated seat of Ronald Briffa in the Local Council Elections for his hometown of Santa Venera, becoming Malta's youngest elected Local Councillor at the time. Six years later, on 25 May 2019, Carabott was re-elected in the Santa Venera Local Council after obtaining the most votes from the contesting candidates. He served his second term as Minority Leader as Partit Nazzjonalista did not manage to obtain the majority of seats in the Santa Venera Local Council. After nine years, Carabott resigned from the Santa Venera Local Council after getting elected to Parliament in 2022.

=== Member of Parliament ===
On 26 March 2022, Carabott successfully contested the general elections on the First Electoral District, comprising Valletta, Hamrun, Marsa, Pietà, Guardamangia and Santa Venera. He polled 2,203 first-count votes, narrowly behind veteran MP Mario de Marco's 2,253. During the 2022–2026 parliamentary term, Carabott served as Shadow Minister for Home Affairs, Security and Reforms. In addition to this role, he was also the President of the Public Accounts Committee and a member of the National Audit Office Accounts Committee. In August 2022, Carabott was elected to the Commonwealth Association for Public Accounts Committees (CAPAC)

At the general election held on 30 May 2026, Carabott was re-elected to the First Electoral District, which following boundary changes comprised Il-Belt Valletta, part of Birkirkara, Fleur-De-Lys (Birkirkara), Floriana, Il-Ħamrun, Il-Marsa, Gwardamanġa (Tal-Pietà) and Santa Venera. He more than doubled his 2022 tally to 4,923 first-count votes, comfortably exceeding the district quota of 3,844 and being elected on the first count. His total represented 21.4% of valid votes cast in the district, making him the Nationalist Party's runaway leader there and one of the party's strongest performers nationally; a surplus of 1,079 of his votes was transferred to other candidates. The election returned the Labour Party under Robert Abela to government for a fourth consecutive term, with the Nationalist Party, now led by Alex Borg, in opposition.

== See also ==
- List of members of the parliament of Malta, 2022–2027
