= Jones Party =

Defunct political party in Malta

The Jones Party was a political party in Malta.

== History ==
The party was established in 1945 in Gozo. It won two seats in the 1947 elections, but lost both in the 1950 elections. After failing to win a seat in the 1951 elections it subsequently disappeared.

== Ideology ==
The party sought to promote agricultural co-operatives, and opposed Malta's dominance within the island group.
