= Clyde Caruana =

Maltese politician (born 1985)

Honourable Clyde Caruana MP
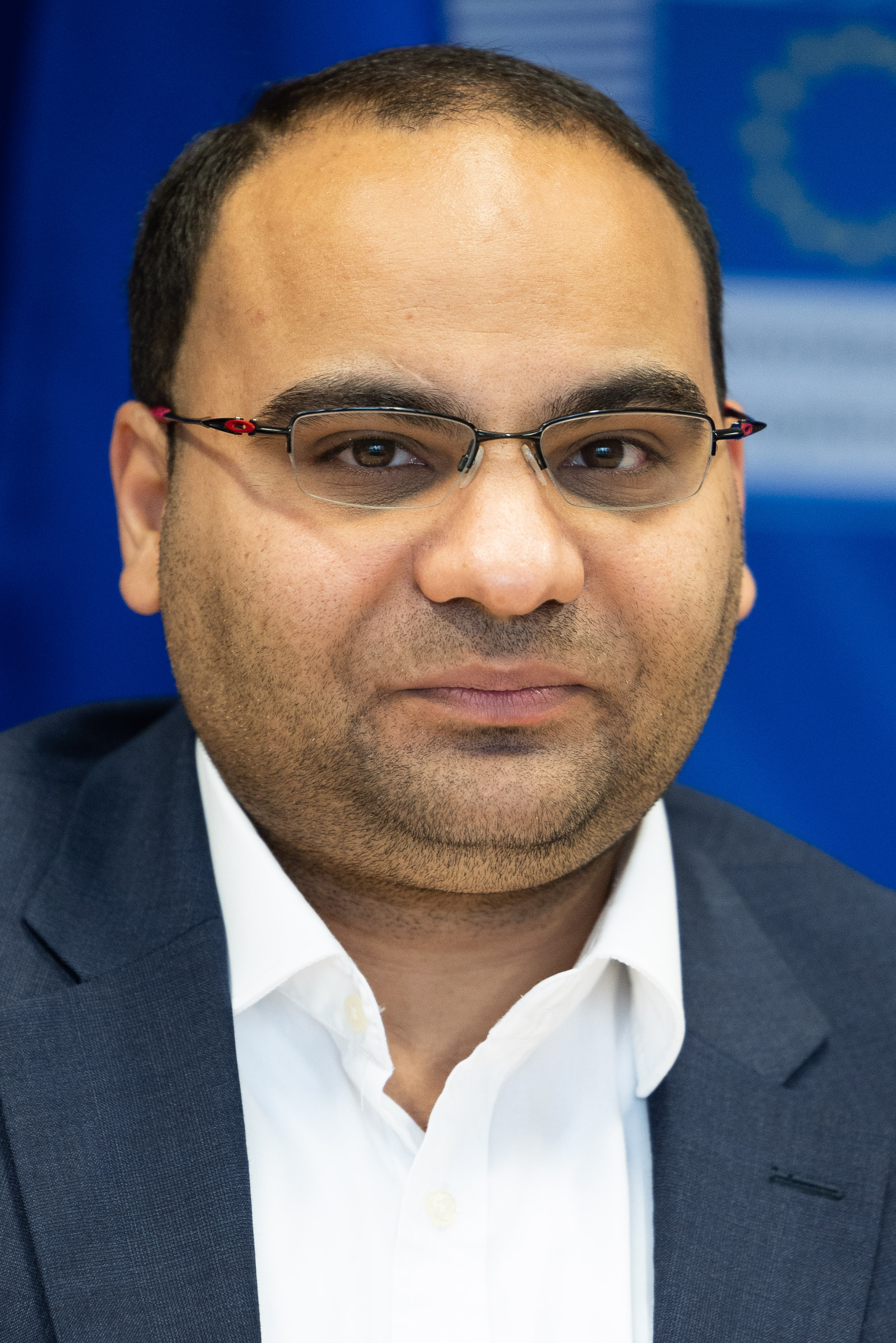
- Caruana in 2022

Minister for Finance
- Incumbent
- Assumed office 22 November 2020
- Prime Minister: Robert Abela
- Preceded by: Edward Scicluna

Member of Parliament
- Incumbent
- Assumed office 19 October 2020
- Constituency: Second District (2020-2022); Eighth District (2022-)

Chief of Staff
- In office 13 January 2020 – 19 October 2020
- Prime Minister: Robert Abela
- Preceded by: Mark Farrugia
- Succeeded by: Glenn Micallef

Mayor of Ħaż-Żabbar
- In office 2006–2009
- Preceded by: Domenic Agius
- Succeeded by: Domenic Agius

Personal details
- Born: 21 February 1985 (age 41)
- Party: Partit Laburista
- Education: University of Malta (B.Com, MA)

Clyde Caruana MP (born 21 February 1985) is a Maltese politician within the Labour Party, serving as Minister for Finance and Employment since November 2020.

== Studies, professional and personal life ==
After growing up in Żabbar, Caruana attended St. Paul's Missionary College in Rabat. He graduated with a bachelor in commerce and then a master in economics at the University of Malta in 2009.

He worked as a statistician within Malta's National Statistics Office between 2007 and 2012.

He has since been a visiting lecturer in economics at the same university, with a specialisation in welfare.

After leaving the Statistics Office, in 2012-2013 Caruana worked as consultant for Malta's General Workers' Union.

Caruana is separated. He has two young children.

== Mayor of Żabbar ==
Caruana served as mayor of his hometown Żabbar between 2006 and 2009. He did not seek re-election for the post in the 2009 local elections.

== Chairman of Jobsplus ==
Following the Labour Party's electoral victory in 2013, Caruana was appointed to head Malta's Employment and Training Corporation, later renamed Jobsplus, which he headed till 2020. He served as Executive Chairman of Jobsplus until December 2018 and as its Chairperson from January 2019 until October 2020.

During his tenure, he was involved in developing and implementing the government's employment policies, including the National Employment Policy (2014), free childcare for working parents, the Making Work Pay initiative and the Youth Guarantee.

He also contributed to the development of in-work benefits and policies intended to increase female labour-market participation and encourage people receiving social assistance to enter employment. Subsequent research by the Central Bank of Malta and the International Monetary Fund identified free childcare and the tapering of social benefits as significant contributors to increased female employment and labour-market participation.

His tenure also coincided with a substantial expansion in the recruitment of foreign workers to meet the demands of Malta's rapidly growing economy. The government's policy of attracting tens of thousands of foreign workers attracted criticism over its potential effects on infrastructure, housing, traffic congestion and employment conditions.

In 2018, the Times of Malta reported that the government had approved plans to recruit 43,000 non-EU workers, while questions remained over whether adequate assessments of the country's infrastructural capacity had been conducted.

Caruana's leadership of Jobsplus was also criticised in connection with alleged abuses of migrant workers employed in the food-delivery and taxi sectors, including allegations that the agency had failed to adequately address unlawful employment practices.

Caruana left the agency in October 2020 when he was appointed Minister for Finance and Employment.

== Minister of Finance and Employment ==
Caruana was selected by Malta Prime Minister Robert Abela to serve as his chief of staff in January 2020. He succeeded Keith Schembri, who resigned in the wake of the 2019–2020 Maltese protests linked to the assassination of Daphne Caruana Galizia, and Mark Farrugia, who temporarily held the role in December 2019.

Caruana was co-opted into Malta's parliament in October 2020, together with former MEP Miriam Dalli, following the resignations of former Prime Minister Joseph Muscat and MP Etienne Grech.

Caruana was appointed Minister for Finance and Employment in November 2020, following the resignation of Edward Scicluna.

During the COVID-19 pandemic in Malta, Caruana oversaw the continuation of government wage-support measures to protect employment and businesses. In subsequent budgets, he pursued an expansionary fiscal policy, maintaining government subsidies on electricity and fuel following the European energy crisis, while introducing increases in pensions, social benefits and income-tax reductions. Stable energy prices helped shield households and businesses from international energy-price increases, but attracted criticism from international institutions because of its cost to public finances. The International Monetary Fund recommended replacing universal energy subsidies with more targeted assistance, noting that energy subsidies accounted for some 40% of Malta's projected budget deficit in 2024.

During his mandate, Malta's budget deficit declined from 7.6% of GDP in 2021 to 3.4% in 2024 and 2.2% in 2025, while public debt remained below the 60% eurozone Maastricht criteria.

Malta was placed under the EU Excessive Deficit Procedure in 2024, a development Caruana said the government had anticipated.

In the 2025 budget, Caruana introduced a substantial reduction in personal income-tax rates, estimated to cost approximately €140 million, arguing that economic growth and improved tax collection would offset part of the revenue loss.

His economic policies have also attracted criticism for their reliance on government expenditure, energy subsidies and a growth model dependent on population expansion and foreign labour. In its 2026 assessment, the IMF called for a transition towards productivity-driven economic growth, greater investment in infrastructure and human capital, and the gradual phasing out of untargeted energy subsidies.

=== 2027 Budget and population policy ===
Caruana's 2027 Budget, presented on 26 October 2026, attracted controversy over measures targeting third-country nationals (TCNs), including increases in work-permit fees, the introduction of an annual €400 infrastructure contribution, an €83 monthly charge for certain TCNs wishing to drive, and the withdrawal of free childcare and public transport benefits for some foreign residents. The measures attracted criticism from migrant organisations, trade unions and business representatives, who raised concerns about their financial impact on foreign workers and their potentially discriminatory effects. Caruana defended the measures as part of an effort to change Malta's economic model, reduce dependence on relatively inexpensive foreign labour and encourage greater investment in technology and productivity. He stated that the measures could slow population growth by making the recruitment of foreign workers more expensive.

The budget controversy also brought renewed attention to Caruana's earlier warnings about population growth. In November 2026, he disclosed that he had authored a 300-page report in 2018, while executive chairman of Jobsplus, examining the consequences of Malta's dependence on foreign labour and the pressures of population growth on housing, healthcare, education and public infrastructure. Caruana said that the report had been commissioned by then prime minister Joseph Muscat, submitted to the government and subsequently shelved. Muscat confirmed the existence of the report, while Caruana's account prompted renewed questions about why its findings had not been made public or acted upon. When opposition MP Adrian Delia called for the report to be published in Parliament on 11 November 2026, Caruana refused, stating that although he was its author, he was not its owner and had no authority to release it. The Office of the Prime Minister subsequently stated that the report had not been submitted to Prime Minister Robert Abela or his Cabinet.
