= 1947 Maltese general election =

- 25–27 October 1947
- 40 seats in the Parliament of Malta; 21 seats needed for a majority
| Party | Leader | Vote % | Seats | +/– |
|---|---|---|---|---|
| Labour | Paul Boffa | 59.86 | 24 | +15 |
| Nationalist | Enrico Mizzi | 18.05 | 7 | +7 |
| Democratic Action | Joseph Hyzler | 13.28 | 4 | New |
| Gozo Party | Francesco Masini | 5.21 | 3 | New |
| Jones Party | Henry Jones | 3.47 | 2 | New |
This lists parties that won seats. See the complete results below.
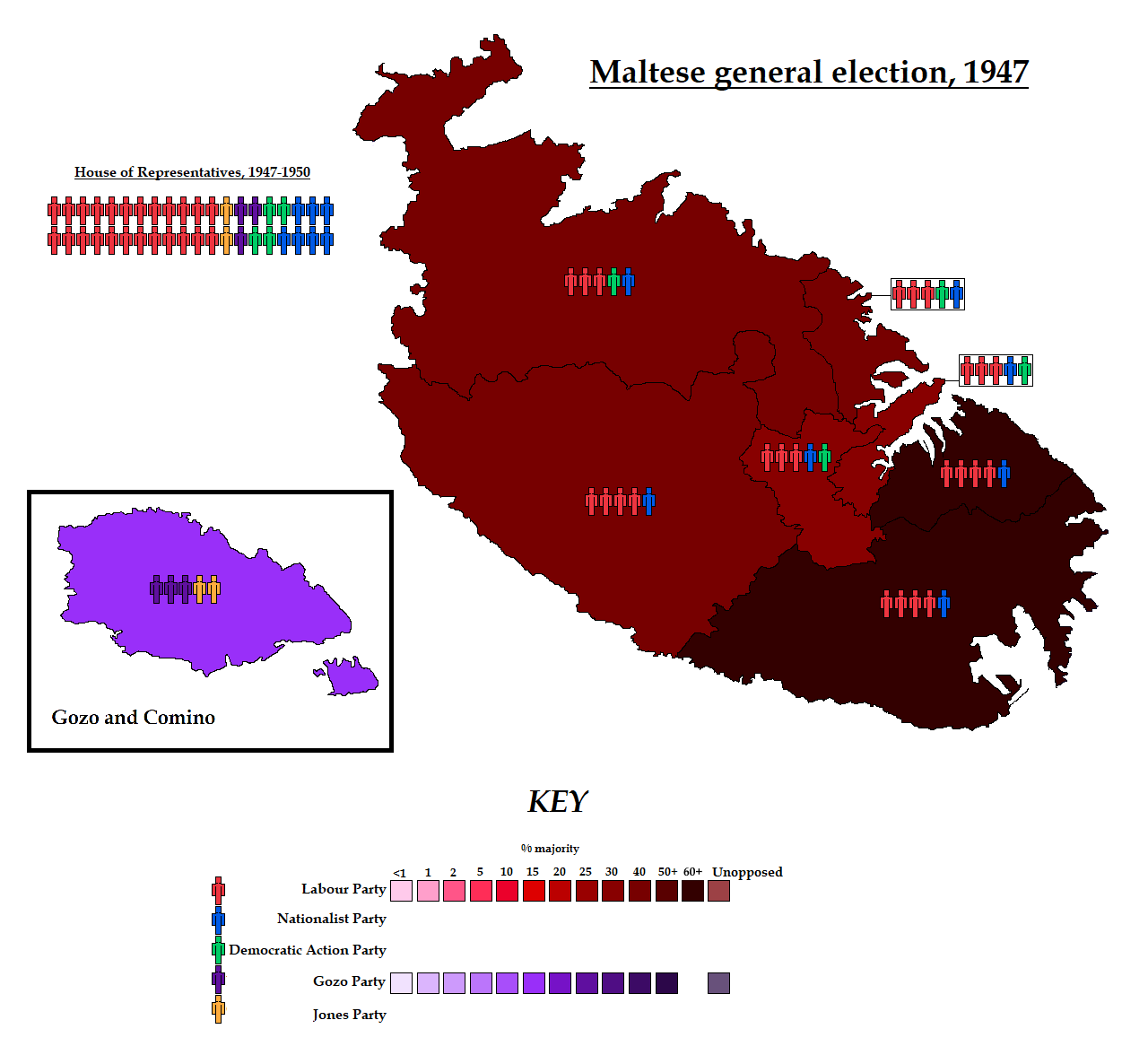
Results by constituency
| Prime Minister after |
|---|
| Paul Boffa; Labour |

General elections were held in Malta between 25 and 27 October 1947. They were the first elections held under universal suffrage for women and Agatha Barbara became the first woman elected to Parliament. These elections saw the Labour Party win 24 of the 40 seats.

== Electoral system ==
The elections were held using the single transferable vote system. Property qualifications for voters were abolished, and women were also allowed to vote for the first time. The number of seats was increased from 10 to 40.

== Results ==
| Party | Votes | % | Seats | +/– |
|---|---|---|---|---|
| Labour Party | 63,145 | 59.86 | 24 | +15 |
| Nationalist Party | 19,041 | 18.05 | 7 | New |
| Democratic Action Party | 14,010 | 13.28 | 4 | New |
| Gozo Party | 5,491 | 5.21 | 3 | New |
| Jones Party | 3,664 | 3.47 | 2 | New |
| Independents | 143 | 0.14 | 0 | –1 |
| Total | 105,494 | 100.00 | 40 | +30 |
| Valid votes | 105,494 | 99.39 | | |
| Invalid/blank votes | 647 | 0.61 | | |
| Total votes | 106,141 | 100.00 | | |
| Registered voters/turnout | 140,703 | 75.44 | | |
Source: Nohlen & Stöver
