= Gozo Party =

Gozo Party Partit Għawdxi
- Founder: Francesco Masini
- Founded: April 1947
- Dissolved: 1950
- Newspaper: Leħen Għawdex

The Gozo Party (Maltese: Partit Għawdxi) was a political party in Malta.

== History ==
The party was established in founded in April 1947 by Francesco Masini. In the October 1947 general elections it contested the 8th District, which covered Gozo, nominating seven candidates. Of the five seats in the district, it won three of them, with Anton Calleja, Guzeppi Cefai and Masini elected to represent the party.

The party contributed to bringing down the government of Paul Boffa in 1950; after a candidate it had recommended for a vacancy for a cook at a hospital was not appointed, it voted for a motion of no confidence in Boffa's government, leading to the Nationalist Party taking power with George Borg Olivier as Prime Minister. However, by mid-1950 the party had disbanded.

== Ideology ==
The party sought to gain better representation and more financial resources for Gozo.

== Election results ==
=== House of Representatives ===
Election	Leader	Votes	%	Seats	Rank
1947	Francesco Masini	5,491	5.21	3 / 40	4th
