= Deo Debattista =

Maltese politician and doctor

Honourable Deo Debattista MP

Member of Parliament
- Incumbent
- Assumed office 13 March 2013
- Constituency: District 1

Parliamentary Secretary for Active Aging in the Office of the Deputy Prime Minister and Minister of Health
- Incumbent
- Assumed office 3 June 2026
- Prime Minister: Robert Abela
- Deputy: Ian Borg ( As Deputy PM)

Parliamentary Secretary for Consumer Rights, Public Cleansing and Support For the Capital City
- In office January 2019 – 15 January 2020
- Prime Minister: Joseph Muscat; Robert Abela

Parliamentary Secretary for Consumer Protection and Valletta 2018
- In office 9 June 2017 – 24 January 2019
- Prime Minister: Joseph Muscat

Parliamentary Secretary for Consumer Protection and Public Cleansing
- In office 15 January 2020 – 20 February 2022
- Prime Minister: Robert Abela

Personal details
- Born: 24 July 1963 (age 62)
- Party: Labour Party

Deo Debattista MP (born July 24, 1963) is a Maltese doctor and politician from the Labour Party. He has been a Member of Parliament representing District 1 since the 2013 general election.
