= Paula Mifsud Bonnici =

Maltese lawyer and politician

Paula Mifsud Bonnici is a Maltese lawyer and politician, member of the Parliament of Malta between 2013 and 2017 for Nationalist Party representing the District 1. She was member of Family Affairs Committee and Social Affairs Committee She forms part of a family of politicians: her father, Antoine Mifsud Bonnici, whose uncle was Carmelo Mifsud Bonnici (il-Gross), Minister between 1920 and 1930, was MP and his brother, Karmenu Mifsud Bonnici, Prime Minister between 1984 and 1987; and her father's cousins are Ugo Mifsud Bonnici, President between 1994 and 1999 and Carmelo Mifsud Bonnici, Minister of Home Affairs between 2008 and 2012.

Paula started in politics in the local elections of 1996 at Ħamrun town and in November 2009 was the first woman elected president of the General Council of Nationalist Party and reelected on 2015. She also was Shadow Minister of Social Affairs. She was re-elected in the 2022 Maltese general election.
