= Cressida Galea =

Maltese politician

Cressida Galea (born 1996 or 1997) is a Maltese economist and politician from the Labour Party. She was elected to the Parliament of Malta in the 2022 Maltese general election under the gender quota.

== See also ==
- List of members of the parliament of Malta, 2022–2027
