= 1951 Maltese general election =

- 5–7 May 1951
- 40 seats in the Parliament of Malta; 21 seats needed for a majority
Party	Leader	Vote %	Seats	+/–
Nationalist	George Borg Olivier	35.47	15	+3
Labour	Dom Mintoff	35.70	14	+3
Workers	Paul Boffa	18.79	7	−4
Constitutional	Robert Galea	8.12	4	0
This lists parties that won seats. See the complete results below.
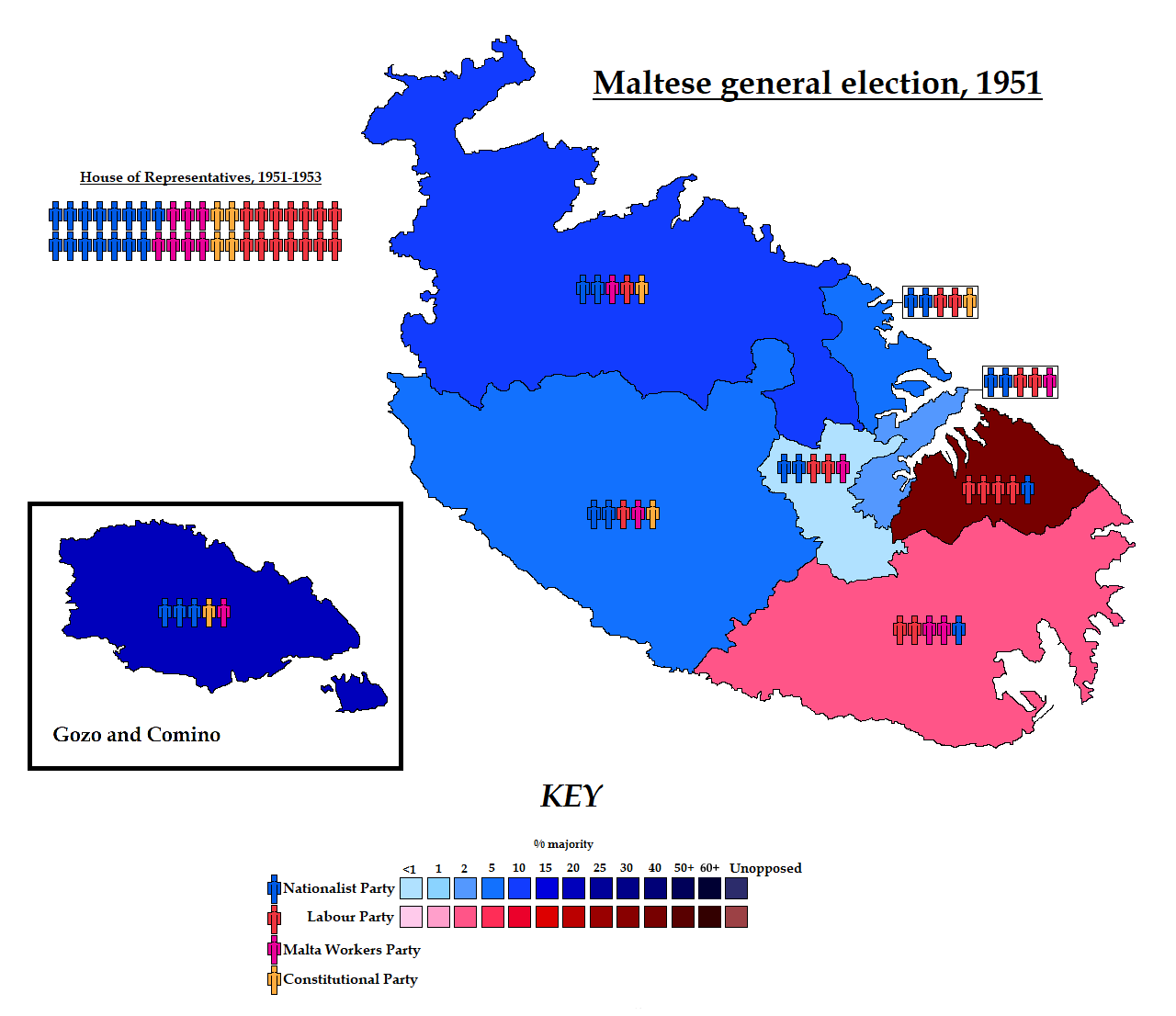
Prime Minister before	Prime Minister after
Giorgio Borġ Olivier; Nationalist	Giorgio Borġ Olivier; Nationalist Party

Early general elections were held in Malta between 5 and 7 May 1951. They came less than a year after the previous elections as a result of disagreements in the coalition government formed by the centre-right Nationalist Party and centre-left Malta Workers Party. Although the Malta Labour Party received the most votes, the Nationalist Party remained the largest party, winning 15 of the 40 seats. Despite their previous disagreements, the Nationalist Party and Workers Party formed a new government.

== Electoral system ==
The elections were held using the single transferable vote system.

== Results ==
Party	Votes	%	Seats	+/–
Malta Labour Party	40,208	35.70	14	+3
Nationalist Party	39,946	35.47	15	+3
Malta Workers Party	21,158	18.79	7	–4
Constitutional Party	9,150	8.12	4	0
Jones Party	957	0.85	0	0
Independents	1,206	1.07	0	–1
Total	112,625	100.00	40	0
Valid votes	112,625	99.35		
Invalid/blank votes	741	0.65		
Total votes	113,366	100.00		
Registered voters/turnout	151,979	74.59		
Source: Nohlen & Stöver
