= Democratic Action Party (Malta) =

Political party in Malta

Democratic Action Party Partit Azzjoni Demokratika
- Abbreviation: DAP
- Leader: Joseph Hyzler
- Founded: 19 March 1947
- Dissolved: September 1950
- Split from: Nationalist Party
- Preceded by: Maltese Political Union
- Ideology: Political Catholicism; British unionism Anti-communism
- Political position: Right-wing

The Democratic Action Party was a political party in Malta.

== History ==
The party was established on 19 March 1947 by former Nationalist legislator Joseph Hyzler, as a revived Maltese Political Union. It won four seats in the elections that year. However, it was reduced to just a single seat in the 1950 elections, and was dissolved shortly thereafter.

== Ideology ==
The party was a grouping of landowners and professionals who sought to oppose economic and social reforms. It also supported protecting the interests of the Catholic church.
