= 1950 Maltese general election =

- 2–4 September 1950
- 40 seats in the Parliament of Malta; 21 seats needed for a majority
Party	Leader	Vote %	Seats	+/–
Nationalist	Enrico Mizzi	29.62	12	+5
Labour	Dom Mintoff	28.58	11	−13
Workers	Paul Boffa	23.19	11	New
Constitutional	Robert Galea	9.97	4	+4
Democratic Action	Joseph Hyzler	5.99	1	−3
This lists parties that won seats. See the complete results below.
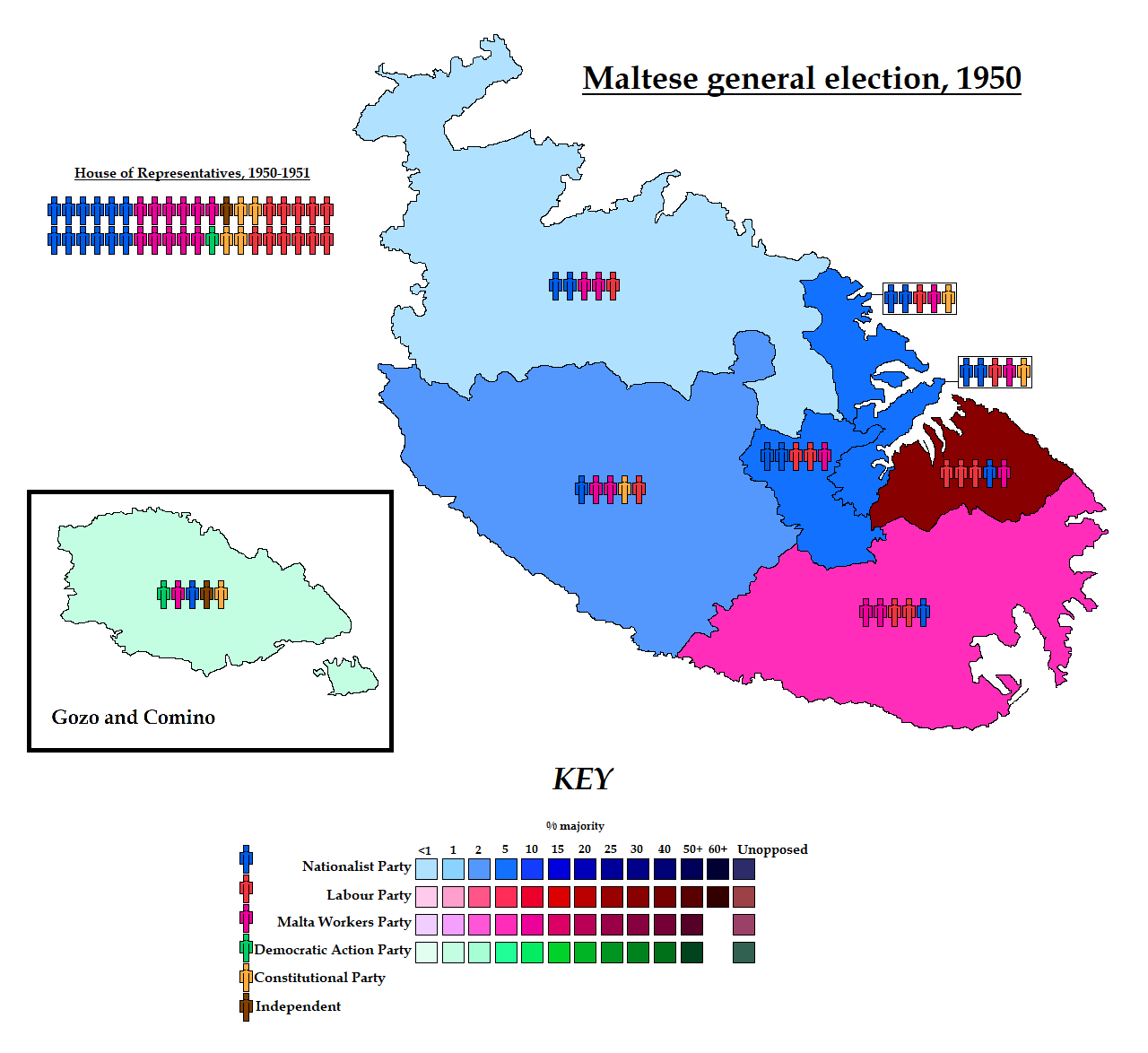
Prime Minister before	Prime Minister after
Paul Boffa; Workers	Enrico Mizzi; Nationalist

General elections were held in Malta between 2 and 4 September 1950. Following the Labour Party splitting into the Malta Labour Party and the Malta Workers Party, the Nationalist Party emerged as the largest party, winning 12 of the 40 seats.

== Electoral system ==
The elections were held using the single transferable vote system.

== Results ==
Party	Votes	%	Seats	+/–
Nationalist Party	31,431	29.62	12	+5
Malta Labour Party	30,332	28.58	11	New
Malta Workers Party	24,616	23.19	11	New
Constitutional Party	10,584	9.97	4	New
Democratic Action Party	6,361	5.99	1	–3
Jones Party	852	0.80	0	–2
Independents	1,953	1.84	1	+1
Total	106,129	100.00	40	0
Valid votes	106,129	99.35		
Invalid/blank votes	691	0.65		
Total votes	106,820	100.00		
Registered voters/turnout	144,516	73.92		
Source: Nohlen & Stöver

== Aftermath ==
In the aftermath of the election the Nationalist Party formed a coalition government with the Workers Party. However, the two parties had a difficult relationship, and early elections were held less than a year later.
