= Malta Workers Party =

Malta Workers Party Partit Malti tal-Ħaddiema
- Leader: Paul Boffa
- Founded: 1949
- Dissolved: 1955
- Split from: Labour Party
- Ideology: Pro–United Kingdom; Anti-communism
- Colours: Brown

The Malta Workers Party (Maltese: Partit Malti tal-Ħaddiema) was a political party in Malta. It was founded in 1949 by then prime minister Paul Boffa, shortly after his leadership of the Labour Party failed a motion of no confidence. The party was part of the opposition from 1950 to 1951, then a coalition government with the Nationalist Party from 1951 to 1955.

== History ==
The Malta Workers Party was formed as a split from the Labour Party. Maltese prime minister Paul Boffa resigned as the Labour Party's leader following a motion of no confidence against him by party members in 1949. He subsequently founded the Workers Party and was joined by his supporters, who considered themselves "moderate" in comparison to those who remained in the Labour Party. Both parties won 11 seats in the 1950 election, allowing the Nationalist Party (which won 12 seats) to form the government. In the general election the following year, the Labour Party won 14 seats and the Workers Party won 7, with the Workers Party joining a coalition government with the conservative Nationalist Party.

The party's support declined rapidly, and it won only three seats in the 1953 election. Boffa resigned as party leader on 12 January 1955 and the party disbanded before the election that year. The Labour Party consequently returned to government with a majority of the seats in the legislature.

== Ideology ==
The party ran on a platform of cooperation with the British authorities in order to promote Maltese interests. It called for economic austerity and diverting public funds to industrial development. Boffa publicly accused his successor as Labour Party leader, Dom Mintoff, of being a communist and anti-clericalist. Nonetheless, Mintoff supported the 1956 United Kingdom integration referendum.

== Election results ==
House of Representatives
Election	Votes	%	Seats	+/–	Rank	Status
1950	24,616	23.2	11 / 40	New	3rd	Opposition
1951	21,158	18.8	7 / 40	▼4	3rd	Coalition
1953	14,000	11.8	3 / 40	▼4	3rd	Coalition
