= 1976 Maltese general election =

- 17–18 September 1976

All 65 seats in the House of Representatives
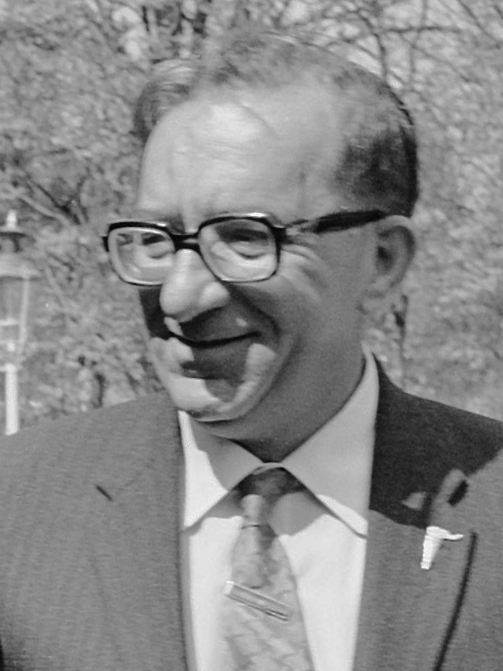

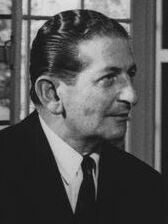
	First party	Second party
Leader	Dom Mintoff	Giorgio Borġ Olivier
Party	Labour	Nationalist
Last election	50.84%, 28 seats	48.05%, 27 seats
Seats won	34	31
Seat change	▲6	▲4
Popular vote	105,845	99,551
Percentage	51.53%	48.46%
Swing	▲0.69pp	▲0.41pp
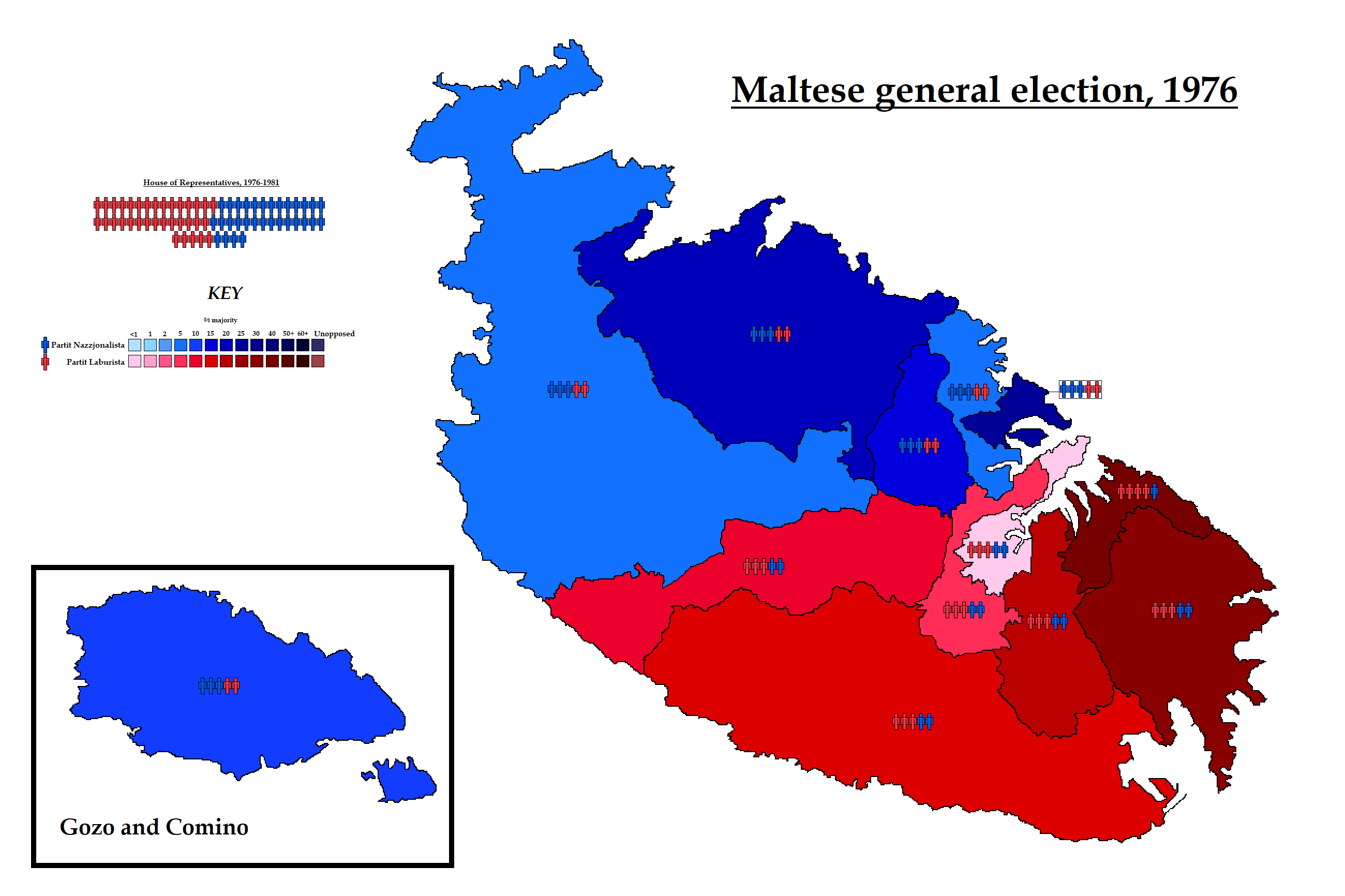
Prime Minister before election
Dom Mintoff
Labour
Elected Prime Minister
Dom Mintoff
Labour

General elections were held in Malta on 17 and 18 September 1976. The Malta Labour Party remained the largest party, winning 34 of the 65 seats.

== Electoral system ==
The elections were held using the single transferable vote system. The number of seats was increased from 55 to 65, whilst the voting age was lowered from 21 to 18.

== Results ==
Party	Votes	%	Seats	+/–
Malta Labour Party	105,854	51.53	34	+6
Nationalist Party	99,551	48.46	31	+4
Independents	35	0.02	0	0
Total	205,440	100.00	65	+10
Valid votes	205,440	99.44		
Invalid/blank votes	1,165	0.56		
Total votes	206,605	100.00		
Registered voters/turnout	217,724	94.89		
Source: Nohlen & Stöver

== Elected Candidates ==
=== District 1 ===
MLP

- Borg, John J. - casual election
- Brincat, Joseph
- Mintoff, Dom - vacated

PN

- Bonnici, Emmanuel
- Borg Olivier, Giorgio - vacated
- Farrugia, Herman - casual election

=== District 2 ===
MLP

- Brincat, Joseph - vacated
- Mintoff, Dom
- Piscopo, Daniel
- Saliba, Joseph - casual election
- Sant, Lorry

PN

- Mifsud Bonnici, Ugo

=== District 3 ===
MLP

- Abela, Wistin
- Attard Bezina, Emmanuel
- Barbara, Agatha

PN

- Cachia Zammit, Alexander
- Muscat, Joseph (Josie)

=== District 4 ===
MLP

- Dalli, John
- Grima, Joseph - casual election
- Moran, Vincent
- Sant, Lorry

PN

- Borg Olivier De Puget, Albert
- Farrugia, Jimmy

=== District 5 ===
MLP

- Calleja, Reno (Żaren)
- Casar, Joseph
- Vella, Karmenu

PN

- Caruana, Carmelo
- Galea, Louis

=== District 6 ===
MLP

- Abela, Ġuze (Joseph)
- Brincat, Carmelo
- Muscat, Philip

PN

- Camilleri, Gius, Maria
- Hyzler, George

=== District 7 ===
MLP

- Buttigieg, Anton
- Buttigieg, John
- Camilleri, Benny - casual election
- Cremona, Danny - vacated

PN

- De Marco, Guido
- Mifsud Bonnici, Antoine

=== District 8 ===
MLP

- Bonaci, Evelyn
- Debono Grech, Joe

PN

- Fenech Adami, Eddie
- Fenech, Joe
- Gauci Borda, Lino (Carmel)

=== District 9 ===
MLP

- Holland, Patrick
- Naudi, Robert

PN

- Bonello Du Puis, George - casual election
- Farrugia, Jimmy
- Felice, Mario - vacated
- Rizzo Naudi, John
- Tabone, Censu

=== District 10 ===
MLP

- Baldacchino, Joseph M.
- Holland, Patrick - vacated
- Privitera, Salvu - casual election

PN

- Falzon, Michael - casual election
- Felice, Mario
- Refalo, Michael
- Tabone, Censu - vacated

=== District 11 ===
MLP

- Micallef, Alfred (Freddie) - vacated
- Micallef, Daniel
- Xuereb, Paul - casual election

PN

- Abela, Sammy (Salvatore)
- Borg Olivier, Giorgio
- Muscat, John

=== District 12 ===
MLP

- Chetcuti Caruana, Paul
- Micallef, Alfred (Freddie)

PN

- Borg Olivier, Paulu - casual election
- Fenech Adami, Eddie - vacated
- Gatt, Lawrence
- Spiteri, Carm. Lino

=== District 13 ===
MLP

- Buttigieg, Carmelo
- Camilleri, Angelo

PN

- Attard, Coronato
- Cauchi Amabile
- Tabone, Anton
