= District 4, Malta =

Electoral district in Malta

District 4
- Parliament of Malta constituency
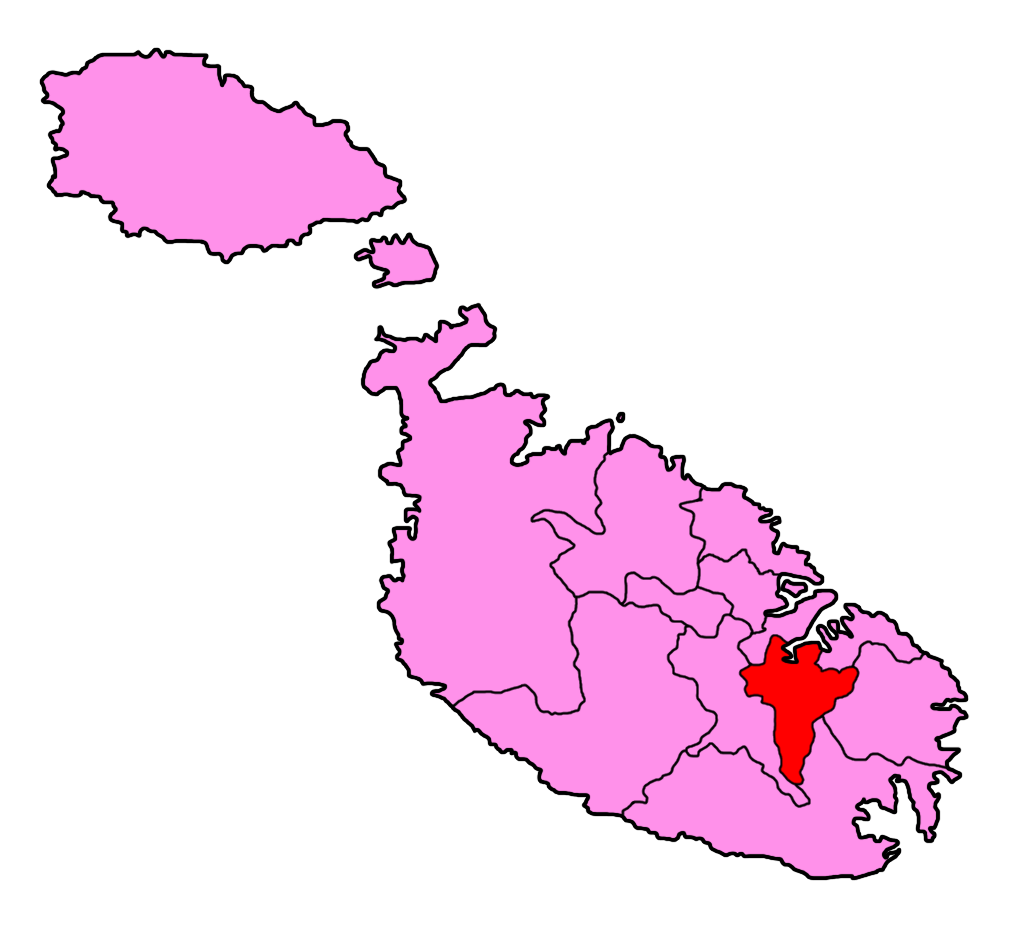
- District within Malta

Current constituency
- Created: 1921
- Seats: 5

District 4 is an electoral district in Malta. It was established in 1921. Its boundaries have changed many times but it currently consists of the localities of Gudja, Paola, Santa Luċija, Tarxien and part of Fgura.

== Representatives ==
Election	Representatives				
1921	Carmelo Bugelli (UPM)	Michael Dundon (Labour)	Pier Giuseppe Frendo (Labour)	Robert E. Hamilton (Conservative)	4 seats 1921–1950
1924	Carmelo Bugelli (UPM)	Carmelo Mifsud Bonniċi (DNP)	Giovanni Bencini (Labour)	Robert E. Hamilton (Conservative)	4 seats 1921–1950
1927	Giuseppe Agius Muscat (Nationalist)	Carmelo Mifsud Bonniċi (DNP)	Michael Dundon (Labour)	Robert E. Hamilton (Conservative)	4 seats 1921–1950
1932	Giuseppe Agius Muscat (Nationalist)	Carmelo Mifsud Bonniċi (DNP)	Gustav Soler (Nationalist)	Robert E. Hamilton (Conservative)	4 seats 1921–1950
District suspended
1947	Albert R. Glenday (Labour)	Godwin G. Ganado (Labour)	Pietru Paul Debono (Labour)	Giorgio Borg Olivier (Nationalist)	4 seats 1921–1935
1950	Joseph F. Abela (Labour)	Godwin G. Ganado (Labour)	Johnnie Cole (Workers')	Giorgio Borg Olivier (Nationalist)	Mabel Strickland (Conservative)
1951	Joseph Abela (Labour)	Godwin G. Ganado (Labour)	Anthony A. Pullicino (Nationalist)	Giorgio Borg Olivier (Nationalist)	Mabel Strickland (Conservative)
1953	Joseph Abela (Labour)	Kalcidon Zammit (Labour)	Anthony A. Pullicino (Nationalist)	Joseph Farrugia (Nationalist)	Philip Saliba (Nationalist)
1955	Joseph Abela (Labour)	Calcedonio Zammit (Labour)	John J. Cole (Labour)	Joseph Farrugia (Nationalist)	John Muscat (Nationalist)
1962	Emmanuel Attard Bezzina (Labour)	Rokku Abdilla (Labour)	Alfred Bonnici (Nationalist)	Alexander Cachia Zammit (Nationalist)	Carmelo Caruana (Nationalist)
1966	Emmanuel Attard Bezzina (Labour)	Rokku Abdilla (Labour)	Wistin Abela (Labour)	Alexander Cachia Zammit (Nationalist)	Carmelo Caruana (Nationalist)
1971	Joseph Cassar (Labour)	Rokku Abdilla (Labour)	Wistin Abela (Labour)	Alexander Cachia Zammit (Nationalist)	Carmelo Caruana (Nationalist)
1976	Joseph Grima (Labour)	Vincent C. Moran (Labour)	John Dalli (Labour)	Jimmy Farrugia (Nationalist)	Albert Borg Olivier De Puget (Nationalist)
1981	Lorry Sant (Labour)	Vincent C. Moran (Labour)	John Dalli (Labour)	Jimmy Farrugia (Nationalist)	Joe Cassar (Nationalist)
1987	Lorry Sant (Labour)	Vincent C. Moran (Labour)	John Dalli (Labour)	Stanley Zammit (Nationalist)	Joe Cassar (Nationalist)
1992	Joseph Brincat (Labour)	Vincent C. Moran (Labour)	Joe Cilia (Labour)	Stanley Zammit (Nationalist)	Joe Cassar (Nationalist)
1996	Alex Sceberras Trigona (Labour)	Karl Chircop (Labour)	Joe Cilia (Labour)	Jesmond Mugliett (Nationalist)	Joe Cassar (Nationalist)
1998	Silvio Parnis (Labour)	Karl Chircop (Labour)	Joe Cilia (Labour)	Jesmond Mugliett (Nationalist)	Jason Azzopardi (Nationalist)
2003	Silvio Parnis (Labour)	Karl Chircop (Labour)	Joseph Brincat (Labour)	Jesmond Mugliett (Nationalist)	Jason Azzopardi (Nationalist)
2008	Silvio Parnis (Labour)	Karl Chircop (Labour)	Charles Maginon (Labour)	Jesmond Mugliett (Nationalist)	Jason Azzopardi (Nationalist)
2013	Silvio Parnis (Labour)	Etienne Grech (Labour)	Konrad Mizzi (Labour)	Joseph Brincat (Labour)	Jason Azzopardi (Nationalist)
2017	Silvio Parnis (Labour)	Etienne Grech (Labour)	Konrad Mizzi (Labour)	Joseph Brincat (Labour)	Jason Azzopardi (Nationalist)
2022	Katya De Giovanni (Labour)	Byron Camilleri (Labour)	Jonathan Attard (Labour)	Chris Bonett (Labour)	Mark Anthony Sammut (Nationalist)
