= District 5, Malta =

Electoral district in Malta

District 5
- Parliament of Malta constituency
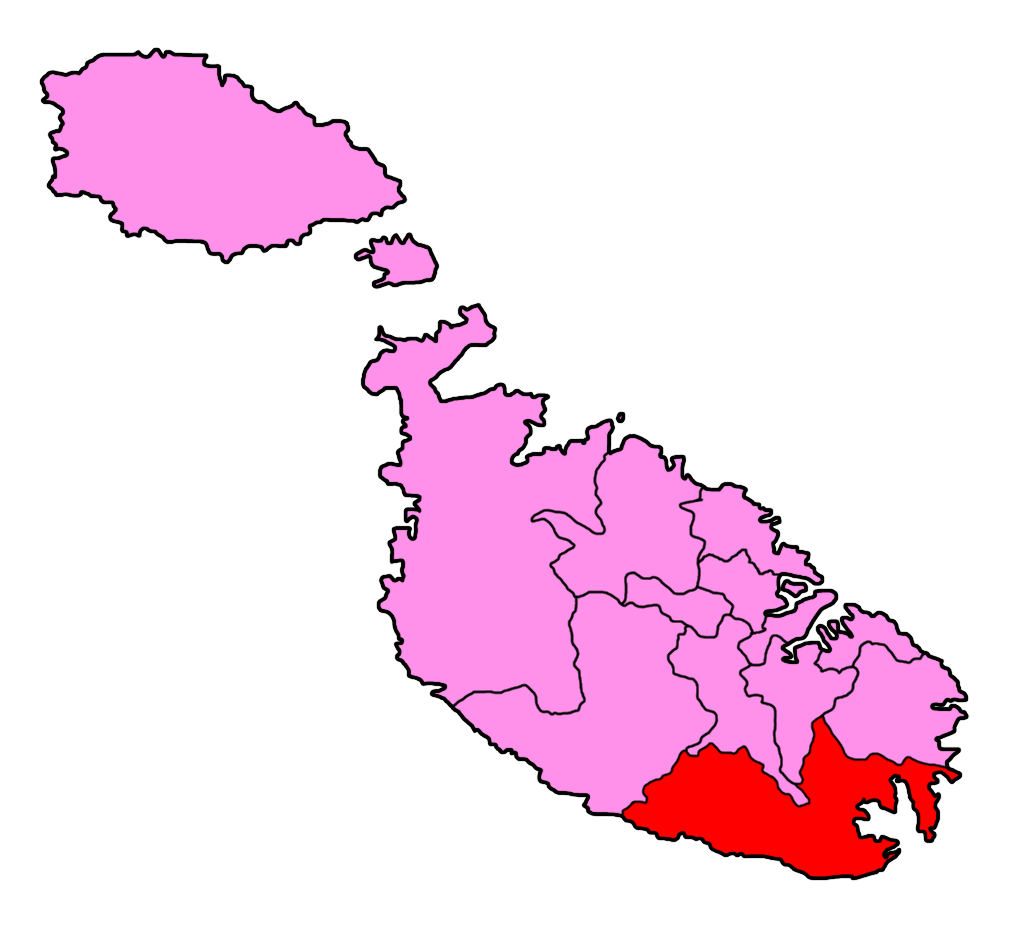
- District within Malta

Current constituency
- Created: 1921
- Seats: 5

District 5 is an electoral district in Malta. It was established in 1921. Its boundaries have changed many times but it currently consists of the localities of Birżebbuġa, Kirkop, Mqabba, Qrendi, Safi and Żurrieq and the hamlet of Ħal Farruġ.

== Representatives ==
Election	Representatives				
1921	Alfredo Mattei (UPM)	Leone Portelli (Labour)	Paolo Borg Grech (Labour)	Vincenzo Busuttil (Labour)	4 seats 1921–1935
1924	Giovanni Adami (UPM)	Lewis F. Mizzi (Conservative)	Paolo Boffa (Labour)	William Savona (Labour)	4 seats 1921–1935
1927	Giovanni Adami (UPM)	Alfred Parnis (Conservative)	Paolo Boffa (Labour)	Alfredo Cachia Zammit (Nationalist)	4 seats 1921–1935
1932	Giovanni Adami (UPM)	Ercole Valenzia (Conservative)	Paulu Boffa (Labour)	Paolino Schembri (Nationalist)	4 seats 1921–1935
District suspended
1947	John Camilleri (Labour)	Turu Colombo (Labour)	Carmelo Agius (Labour)	Giuseppe Pace (DAP)	John (Jack) Frendo Azzopardi (Nationalist)
1950	Edwin Craig (Labour)	Arthur F. Colombo (Workers')	Fortunato Mizzi (Nationalist)	J. Frendo Azzopardi (Nationalist)	Vincent Scerri (Conservative)
1951	Cikku Bonaci (Labour)	Joseph Ellul Mercer (Labour)	Fortunato Mizzi (Nationalist)	John Frendo Azzopardi (Nationalist)	Robert Galea (Conservative)
1953	Cikku Bonaci (Labour)	Joseph Ellul Mercer (Labour)	Gaetano Borg Olivier (Nationalist)	John Frendo Azzopardi (Nationalist)	Giovanni Felice (Nationalist)
1955	Maurice Decesare (Labour)	Joseph Ellul Mercer (Labour)	Oscar Rizzo (Nationalist)	J. Frendo Azzopardi (Nationalist)	Giovanni Felice (Nationalist)
1962	Filippo Muscat (Labour)	Lino Carmel Paul Spiteri (Labour)	Nazareno Pisani (Nationalist)	J. Frendo Azzopardi (Nationalist)	Philip Saliba (Nationalist)
1966	Joseph Abela (Labour)	Philip Muscat (Labour)	Albert Borg Olivier De Puget (Nationalist)	George Hyzler (Nationalist)	Philip Saliba (Nationalist)
1971	Joseph Abela (Labour)	Philip Muscat (Labour)	Albert Borg Olivier De Puget (Nationalist)	George Hyzler (Nationalist)	Albert Hyzler (Labour)
1976	Joseph Cassar (Labour)	Karmenu Vella (Labour)	Reno (Zaren) Calleja (Labour)	Carmelo Caruana (Nationalist)	Louis Galea (Nationalist)
1981	Joseph Cassar (Labour)	Karmenu Vella (Labour)	Reno (Zaren) Calleja (Labour)	Ninu (Anthony) Zammit (Nationalist)	Louis Galea (Nationalist)
1987	Ġużè Cassar (Labour)	Karmenu Vella (Labour)	Reno (Zaren) Calleja (Labour)	Ninu (Anthony) Zammit (Nationalist)	Louis Galea (Nationalist)
1992	Louis Buhagiar (Labour)	Karmenu Vella (Labour)	Reno (Zaren) Calleja (Labour)	Ninu (Anthony) Zammit (Nationalist)	Louis Galea (Nationalist)
1996	Louis Buhagiar (Labour)	Karmenu Vella (Labour)	George Vella (Labour)	Helen D'Amato (Nationalist)	Ninu Zammit (Nationalist)
1998	Louis Buhagiar (Labour)	Karmenu Vella (Labour)	Joseph M. Sammut (Labour)	Helen D'Amato (Nationalist)	Ninu Zammit (Nationalist)
2003	Marlene Pullicino (Labour)	Karmenu Vella (Labour)	Joseph M. Sammut (Labour)	Helen D'Amato (Nationalist)	Ninu Zammit (Nationalist)
2008	Marlene Pullicino (Labour)	Karmenu Vella (Labour)	Joseph M. Sammut (Labour)	Franco Debono (Nationalist)	Ninu Zammit (Nationalist)
2013	Edward Scicluna (Labour)	Karmenu Vella (Labour)	Joseph M. Sammut (Labour)	Marlene Farrugia (Independent)	Toni Bezzina (Nationalist)
2017	Owen Bonnici (Labour)	Julia Farrugia Portelli (Labour)	Stefan Zrinzo Azzopardi (Labour)	Hermann Schiavone (Nationalist)	Toni Bezzina (Nationalist)
2022	Owen Bonnici (Labour)	Miriam Dalli (Labour)	Stefan Zrinzo Azzopardi (Labour)	Omar Farrugia (Labour)	Stanley Zammit (Nationalist)
