= District 2, Malta =

Electoral district in Malta

Coordinates: 35°53′10″N 14°31′20″E

District 2
- Parliament of Malta constituency
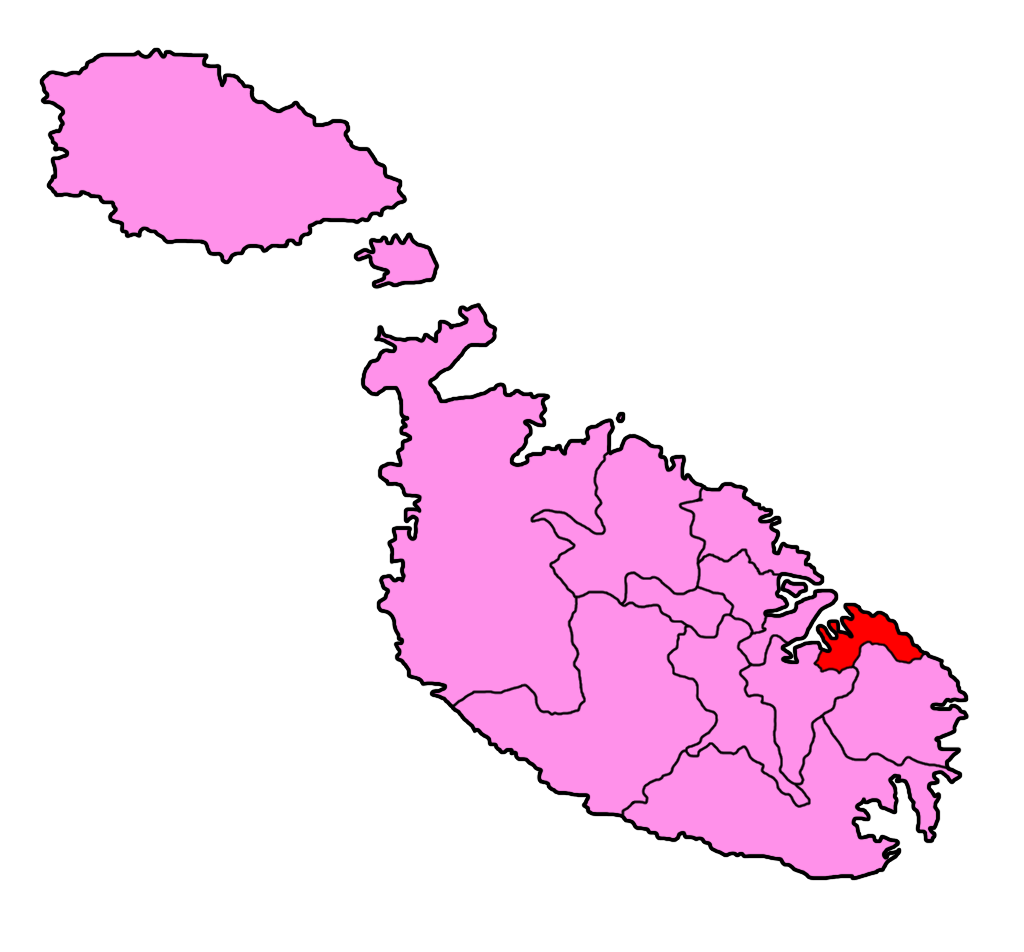
- District within Malta

Current constituency
- Created: 1921
- Seats: 5

District 2 is an electoral district in Malta. It was established in 1921. Its boundaries have changed many times but it currently consists of the localities of Birgu, Senglea, Cospicua, Żabbar, Kalkara, Xgħajra and part of Fgura.

== Representatives ==
=== 1889-1921: one seat ===
Election	Representative
1889	Sigismondo Savona
1892	Latterio Vallone
1895	Ernesto Manara
1898	Paolo Sammut
1900	Emmanuel Testaferrata Bonnici Axiaq
1904	Paolo Sammut
1909	Emmanuele Said
1911	vacant
1912	G Caruana Mamo
1915	Giuseppe Vassallo
1917	Giov. Gabaretta

=== 1921-present: five seats ===
Election	Representatives				
1921	Vincenzo Farrugia (Labour)	Augusto Bartolo (Conservative)	Emmanuele Said (UPM)	Enrico Dandria (UPM)	4 seats 1921–1939
1924	Vincenzo Farrugia (Labour)	Augusto Bartolo (Conservative)	Alberto Magri (DNP)	Enrico Dandria (UPM)	4 seats 1921–1939
1927	Anthony Montano (Conservative)	Augusto Bartolo (Conservative)	Alfredo W. Azzopardi (Nationalist)	Enrico Dandria (UPM)	4 seats 1921–1939
1932	Anthony Montano (Conservative)	Robert V. Galea (Conservative)	Alberto Mizzi (Nationalist)	Enrico Dandria (UPM)	4 seats 1921–1939
1939	Anthony Montano (Conservative)	Albert V. Bartoli (Conservative)	Henry Sacco (Conservative)	Roger Strickland (Conservative)	Enrico Mizzi (Nationalist)
1945	Ant. Schembri Adami (Labour)	Arthur F. Colombo (Labour)	Godwin G. Ganado (Labour)	Robert Bencini (Labour)	Henry Jones (Independent)
1947	Agatha Barbara (Labour)	Guze Attard Bezzina (Labour)	John Raimondo (Labour)	Nestu Laviera (Labour)	Joseph Agius Muscat (Nationalist)
1950	Agatha Barbara (Labour)	Daniel Piscopo (Labour)	Anglu Boffa (Workers')	Nestu Laviera (Labour)	Giuseppe Agius Muscat (Nationalist)
1951	Agatha Barbara (Labour)	Daniel Piscopo (Labour)	Dom Mintoff (Labour)	Nestu Laviera (Labour)	Joseph F. Cassar Galea (Nationalist)
1953	Agatha Barbara (Labour)	Daniel Piscopo (Labour)	Antonio Paris (Nationalist)	Nestu Laviera (Labour)	Joseph F. Cassar Galea (Nationalist)
1955	Agatha Barbara (Labour)	Daniel Piscopo (Labour)	Antonio Paris (Nationalist)	Nestu Laviera (Labour)	Dom Mintoff (Labour)
1962	Agatha Barbara (Labour)	Daniel Piscopo (Labour)	Antonio Paris (Nationalist)	Nestu Laviera (Labour)	Espedito Catania (Nationalist)
1966	Agatha Barbara (Labour)	Daniel Piscopo (Labour)	Josie Muscat (Nationalist)	Nestu Laviera (Labour)	Ugo Mifsud Bonniċi (Nationalist)
1971	Agatha Barbara (Labour)	Daniel Piscopo (Labour)	Josie Muscat (Nationalist)	Dom Mintoff (Labour)	Ugo Mifsud Bonniċi (Nationalist)
1976	Joseph Saliba (Labour)	Daniel Piscopo (Labour)	Lorry Sant (Labour)	Dom Mintoff (Labour)	Ugo Mifsud Bonniċi (Nationalist)
1981	Joseph Saliba (Labour)	Freddie Bartolo (Labour)	Joseph (Joe) Grima (Labour)	Piju Busuttil (Labour)	Ugo Mifsud Bonniċi (Nationalist)
1987	Joe Mizzi (Labour)	Salvu Sant (Labour)	Wenzu Mintoff (Labour)	Manuel Borda (Nationalist)	Ugo Mifsud Bonniċi (Nationalist)
1992	Joe Mizzi (Labour)	Salvu Sant (Labour)	Edwin Grech (Labour)	Dom Mintoff (Labour)	Ugo Mifsud Bonniċi (Nationalist)
1996	Joe Mizzi (Labour)	Christopher Agius (Labour)	Edwin Grech (Labour)	Dom Mintoff (Labour)	Lawrence Gonzi (Nationalist)
1998	Joe Mizzi (Labour)	Christopher Agius (Labour)	Rita Law (Labour)	Carmelo Mifsud Bonnici (Nationalist)	Lawrence Gonzi (Nationalist)
2003	Joe Mizzi (Labour)	Christopher Agius (Labour)	Stefan Buontempo (Labour)	Carmelo Mifsud Bonnici (Nationalist)	Lawrence Gonzi (Nationalist)
2008	Joe Mizzi (Labour)	Christopher Agius (Labour)	Joseph Muscat (Labour)	Stephen Spiteri (Nationalist)	Lawrence Gonzi (Nationalist)
2013	Joe Mizzi (Labour)	Christopher Agius (Labour)	Joseph Muscat (Labour)	Stephen Spiteri (Nationalist)	Lawrence Gonzi (Nationalist)
2017	Joe Mizzi (Labour)	Christopher Agius (Labour)	Joseph Muscat (Labour)	Stephen Spiteri (Nationalist)	Glenn Bedingfield (Labour)
2022	Alison Zerafa Civelli (Labour)	Christopher Agius (Labour)	Robert Abela (Labour)	Stephen Spiteri (Nationalist)	Glenn Bedingfield (Labour)

== Election results ==
=== 2022 general election ===
2022 general election: District 2
Party	Candidate	FPv%	Count																						
Party	Candidate	FPv%	1	2	3	4	5	6	7	8	9	10	11	12	13	14	15	16	17	18	19	20	21	22	23
Labour Party	Robert Abela	51.3	11,694																						
Nationalist Party	Stephen Spiteri	20.8	4,736	4,736																					
Labour Party	Clyde Caruana (Note: Resigned immediately post-election due to election in District 8)	2.1	490	2,868	2,873	8,273	2,874	2,875	2,875	2,879	2,901	2,902	2,944	2,945	2,979	3,007	3,010	3,126	3,129	3,372	3,724	4,115			
Labour Party	Christopher Agius	2.5	576	1,196	1,203	1,203	1,203	1,203	1,203	1,204	1,215	1,215	1,220	1,221	1,235	1,246	1,247	1,591	1,593	1,777	1,988	2,289	2,381	2,951	2,975
Labour Party	Alison Zerafa Civelli	1.7	386	1,357	1,364	1,365	1,366	1,367	1,371	1,371	1,386	1,387	1,413	1,414	1,496	1,512	1,515	1,600	1,601	1,704	1,904	2,139	2,201	2,784	2,828
Labour Party	Byron Camilleri	1.5	338	1,266	1,271	1,271	1,271	1,271	1,271	1,274	1,285	1,287	1,306	1,306	1,328	1,336	1,338	1,425	1,427	1,566	1,753	1,979	2,081	2,680	2,701
Nationalist Party	Bernice Bonello (Note: Elected under article 52A(1) (gender quota).)	1.9	440	445	742	743	744	744	745	756	756	917	918	1,036	1,041	1,077	1,294	1,295	2,117	2,123	2,140	2,142	2,144	2,177	
Labour Party	James Grech	3.4	781	1,407	1,415	1,415	1,416	1,416	1,420	1,425	1,453	1,453	1,486	1,488	1,498	1,508	1,512	1,542	1,546	1,605	1,692	1,907	1,961		
Labour Party	Joe Mizzi	3.0	682	1,150	1,159	1,161	1,162	1,162	1,164	1,168	1,174	1,174	1,188	1,189	1,205	1,216	1,217	1,258	1,262	1,352	1,488				
Labour Party	Oliver Scicluna	1.8	417	966	974	976	977	977	978	980	998	998	1,034	1,037	1,068	1,104	1,112	1,162	1,166	1,266					
Labour Party	Glenn Bedingfield (Note: Elected through casual election after Clyde Caruana's immediate post-election resignation)	1.5	337	839	844	844	844	844	844	845	852	852	867	867	884	891	891	956	960						
Nationalist Party	Errol Cutajar	1.4	311	313	565	567	568	568	568	574	575	589	590	649	649	663	882	882							
Labour Party	Carmelo Abela	1.2	267	764	766	766	766	767	768	772	778	778	797	797	815	831	832								
Nationalist Party	Leone Sciberras	0.9	203	205	381	382	383	383	383	392	392	411	411	456	457	479									
AD+PD	Mario Mallia	1.4	311	314	324	326	327	328	343	357	358	361	361	365	365										
Labour Party	Amanda Spiteri Grech	0.4	96	242	243	243	243	243	244	245	249	249	254	255											
Nationalist Party	Doris Borg	0.7	152	153	233	233	233	234	234	236	236	248	248												
Labour Party	Mark Grech	0.5	108	217	219	219	219	219	219	220	226	226													
Nationalist Party	Malcolm Bezzina	0.7	153	155	208	208	208	208	212	215	216														
Labour Party	Edward Cassar Delia	0.3	71	149	149	149	149	149	149	149															
People's Party	Edgar Apap	0.5	115	116	118	121	122	122	134																
ABBA	Jesrit Angel Camilleri	0.3	68	69	70	70	84	121																	
ABBA	Romina Magro	0.2	37	38	39	39	45																		
ABBA	Antoine Daccache	0.1	29	30	32	32																			
Independent	Jane Chircop	0.1	18	18	18																				
Electorate: 26,942 Valid: 22,816 Spoilt: 651 (2.8%) Quota: 3,803 Turnout: 23,467 (87.1%)
