= List of prime ministers of Malta =

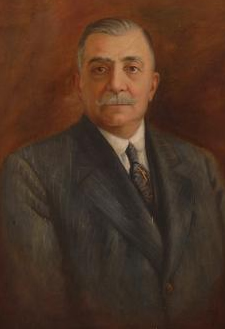
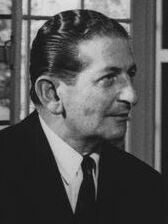
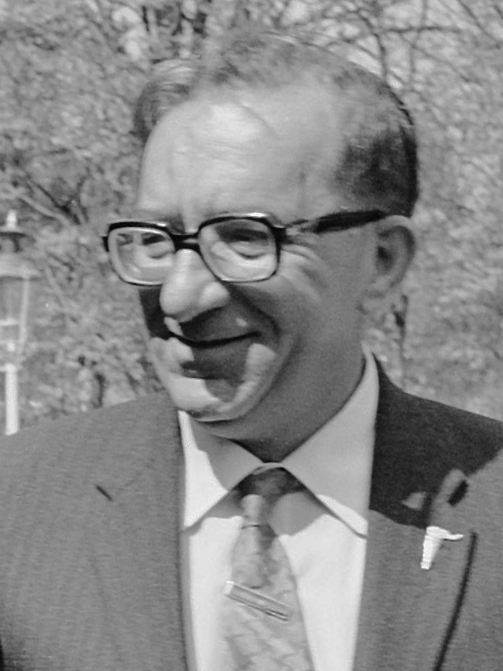
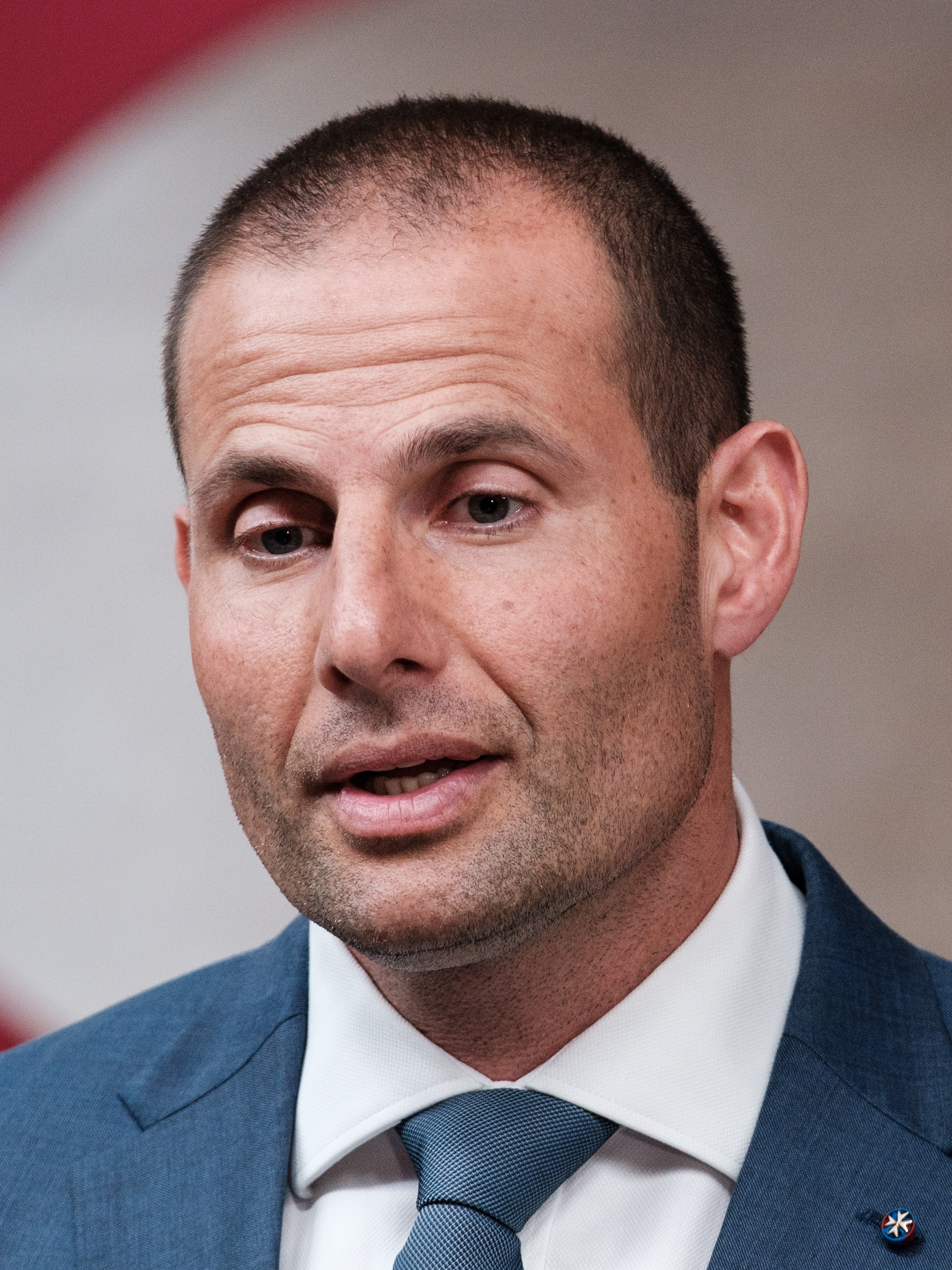
- Top left: Joseph Howard was the first prime minister of Malta.
- Top right: Giorgio Borġ Olivier was the 7th prime minister and presided over Malta's achievement of independence.
- Bottom left: Dom Mintoff was the longest-serving prime minister in Maltese history and presided over Malta's transition to a republic.
- Bottom right: Robert Abela is the current prime minister of Malta.

The prime minister of Malta (Maltese: Prim Ministru ta' Malta) is the head of government, which is the highest official of Malta. The Prime Minister chairs Cabinet meetings, and selects its ministers to serve in their respective portfolios. The Prime Minister holds office by virtue of their ability to command the confidence of the Parliament, as such they sit as Member of Parliament.

The Prime Minister is appointed by the President, in doing so, the President is of the opinion that the appointed individual is the most able to command the majority of the House of Representatives; typically, this individual is the leader of a political party or coalition of parties that hold the largest number of seats in the House of Representatives.

Fourteen people have served as prime minister of Malta since the office was established in 1921. The post did not exist in the period between 1933 and 1947 and also in the period between 1958 and 1962. Joseph Howard was the inaugural holder of the role, while Robert Abela is the incumbent. As of 2022, there have been 5 Nationalist Party prime ministers, 6 Labour Party prime ministers, 2 Political Union-affiliated prime ministers, 1 Constitutionalist prime minister and one Workers Party-affiliated prime minister.

== List of officeholders ==
Political parties

Political Union (UPM)
Nationalist Party (PN)
Constitutional Party (PK)
Labour Party (PL)
Workers Party (MWP)

No.	Portrait	Name (Birth–Death)	Term of office			Political party	Elected	Cabinet(s)	Ref.
No.	Portrait	Name (Birth–Death)	Took office	Left office	Time in office	Political party	Elected	Cabinet(s)	Ref.
1		Joseph Howard (1862–1925)	26 October 1921	13 October 1923	1 year, 352 days	Political Union	1921	Howard	
2		Francesco Buhagiar (1876–1934)	13 October 1923	22 September 1924	345 days	Political Union	—	Buhagiar	
3		Ugo Pasquale Mifsud (1889–1942)	22 September 1924	1 August 1927	2 years, 313 days	Nationalist Party	1924	Mifsud I	
4		Lord Strickland (Note: Known as Sir Gerald Strickland between 1897 and January 1928.) (1861–1940)	9 August 1927	21 June 1932	4 years, 317 days	Constitutional Party	1927	Strickland	
(3)		Sir Ugo Pasquale Mifsud (Note: Knighted in 1927.) (1889–1942)	21 June 1932	2 November 1933	1 year, 134 days	Nationalist Party	1932	Mifsud II	
Office Abolished (2 November 1933 – 4 November 1947)
5		Paul Boffa (1890–1962)	4 November 1947	26 September 1950	2 years, 326 days	Labour Party (until 1949)	1947	Boffa I	
5		Paul Boffa (1890–1962)	4 November 1947	26 September 1950	2 years, 326 days	Workers Party	—	Boffa II	
6		Enrico Mizzi (1885–1950)	26 September 1950	20 December 1950 #	85 days	Nationalist Party	1950	Mizzi	
7		Giorgio Borġ Olivier (1911–1980)	20 December 1950	11 March 1955	4 years, 81 days	Nationalist Party	—	Olivier I	
7		Giorgio Borġ Olivier (1911–1980)	20 December 1950	11 March 1955	4 years, 81 days	Nationalist Party	1951	Olivier II	
7		Giorgio Borġ Olivier (1911–1980)	20 December 1950	11 March 1955	4 years, 81 days	Nationalist Party	1953	Olivier III	
8		Dom Mintoff (1916–2012)	11 March 1955	26 April 1958	3 years, 46 days	Labour Party	1955	Mintoff I	
Office Abolished (26 April 1958 – 5 March 1962)
(7)		Giorgio Borġ Olivier (1911–1980)	5 March 1962	21 June 1971	9 years, 108 days	Nationalist Party	1962	Olivier IV	
(7)		Giorgio Borġ Olivier (1911–1980)	5 March 1962	21 June 1971	9 years, 108 days	Nationalist Party	1966	Olivier V	
(8)		Dom Mintoff (1916–2012)	21 June 1971	22 December 1984	13 years, 184 days	Labour Party	1971	Mintoff II	
(8)		Dom Mintoff (1916–2012)	21 June 1971	22 December 1984	13 years, 184 days	Labour Party	1976	Mintoff III	
(8)		Dom Mintoff (1916–2012)	21 June 1971	22 December 1984	13 years, 184 days	Labour Party	1981	Mintoff IV	
9		Karmenu Mifsud Bonnici (1933–2022)	22 December 1984	12 May 1987	2 years, 141 days	Labour Party	—	Bonnici	
10		Eddie Fenech Adami (born 1934)	12 May 1987	28 October 1996	9 years, 169 days	Nationalist Party	1987	Adami I	
10		Eddie Fenech Adami (born 1934)	12 May 1987	28 October 1996	9 years, 169 days	Nationalist Party	1992	Adami II	
11		Alfred Sant (born 1948)	28 October 1996	6 September 1998	1 year, 313 days	Labour Party	1996	Sant	
(10)		Eddie Fenech Adami (born 1934)	6 September 1998	23 March 2004	5 years, 199 days	Nationalist Party	1998	Adami III	
(10)		Eddie Fenech Adami (born 1934)	6 September 1998	23 March 2004	5 years, 199 days	Nationalist Party	2003	Adami IV–Gonzi I	
12		Lawrence Gonzi (born 1953)	23 March 2004	11 March 2013	8 years, 353 days	Nationalist Party	—	Adami IV–Gonzi I	
12		Lawrence Gonzi (born 1953)	23 March 2004	11 March 2013	8 years, 353 days	Nationalist Party	2008	Gonzi II	
13		Joseph Muscat (born 1974)	11 March 2013	12 January 2020	6 years, 308 days	Labour Party	2013	Muscat I	
13		Joseph Muscat (born 1974)	11 March 2013	12 January 2020	6 years, 308 days	Labour Party	2017	Muscat II–Abela I	
14		Robert Abela (born 1977)	12 January 2020	Incumbent	6 years, 250 days	Labour Party	—	Muscat II–Abela I	
14		Robert Abela (born 1977)	12 January 2020	Incumbent	6 years, 250 days	Labour Party	2022	Abela II	
14		Robert Abela (born 1977)	12 January 2020	Incumbent	6 years, 250 days	Labour Party	2026	Abela III	

== See also ==
- Prime Minister of Malta
- President of Malta
- Government of Malta
- House of Representatives of Malta
