= District 3, Malta =

Electoral district in Malta

District 3
- Parliament of Malta constituency
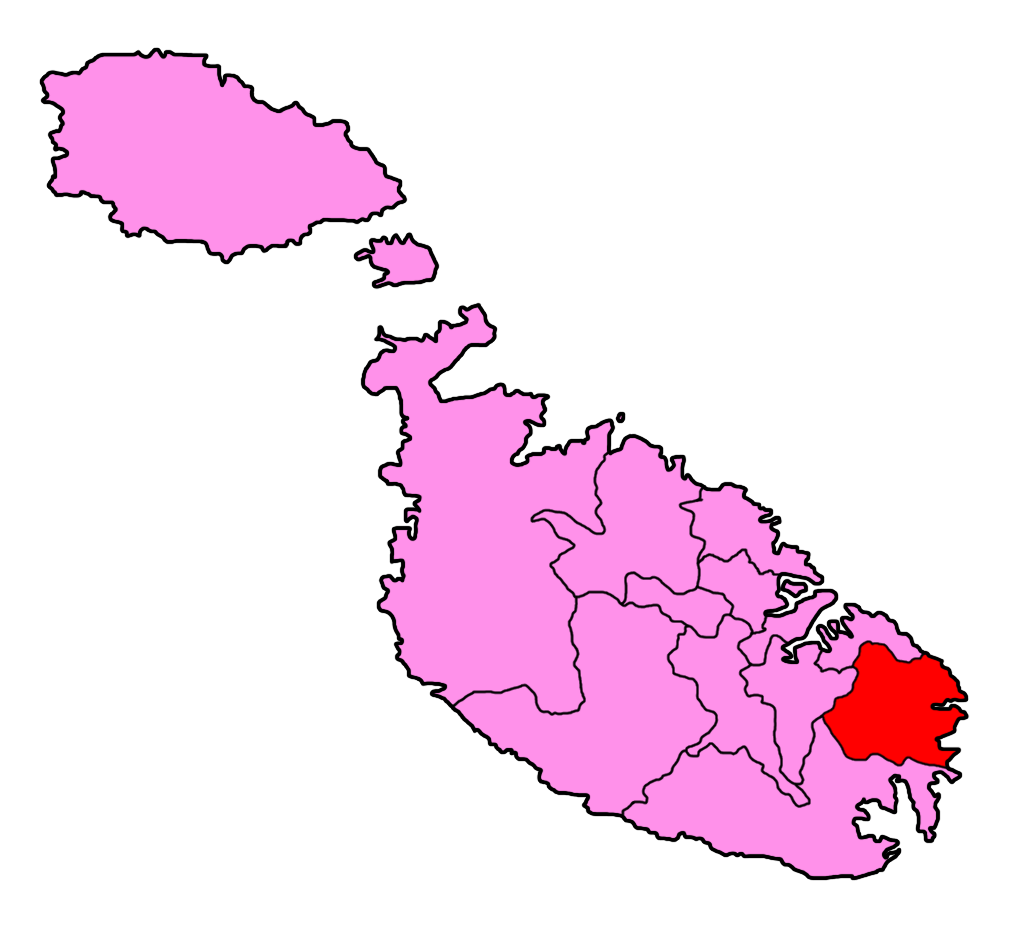
- District within Malta

Current constituency
- Created: 1921
- Seats: 5

District 3 is an electoral district in Malta. It was established in 1921. Its boundaries have changed many times but it currently consists of the localities of Żejtun, Għaxaq, Marsaskala and Marsaxlokk.

== Representatives ==
Election	Representatives				
1921	Antonio Dalli (UPM)	Charles Sydney Henry (Conservative)	Filippo Nicolo Buttigieg (UPM)	Michel Borg (UPM)	4 seats 1921–1935
1924	Antonio Dalli (UPM)	Charles Sydney Henry (Conservative)	Giuseppe Mifsud Ellul (Labour)	Fortunato Ellul (UPM)	4 seats 1921–1935
1927	Antonio Dalli (UPM)	Robert Bencini (Conservative)	Enrico Sacco (Labour)	Achille Samut (Conservative)	4 seats 1921–1935
1932	Antonio Dalli (UPM)	Robert Bencini (Conservative)	Federico F. Maempel Naudi (Nationalist)	Michel Borg (Nationalist)	4 seats 1921–1935
District suspended
1947	Emmanuel Attard Bezzina (Labour)	Ġużè Cassar (Labour)	Pawlu Boffa (Labour)	Johnnie Cole (Workers')	Carmelo Caruana (Nationalist)
1950	Emmanuel Attard Bezzina (Labour)	Ġużè Cassar (Labour)	Pawlu Boffa (Labour)	Salvu Cacciottolo (Labour)	Carmelo Caruana (Nationalist)
1951	Emmanuel Attard Bezzina (Labour)	Ġużè Cassar (Labour)	Johnnie Cole (Workers')	Salvu Cacciottolo (Labour)	Carmelo Caruana (Nationalist)
1953	Emmanuel Attard Bezzina (Labour)	Ġużè Cassar (Labour)	Johnnie Cole (Workers')	George Borg (Labour)	Carmelo Caruana (Nationalist)
1955	Emmanuel Attard Bezzina (Labour)	Joseph Cassar (Labour)	Alexander Cachia Zammit (Nationalist)	George Borg (Labour)	Carmelo Caruana (Nationalist)
1962	Lorry Sant (Labour)	Vincent Moran (Labour)	Emilio Camilleri (CWP)	Giorg Caruana (Nationalist)	Joseph F. Cassar Galea (Nationalist)
1966	Lorry Sant (Labour)	Vincent Moran (Labour)	Paul Carachi (Labour)	George Caruana (Nationalist)	Joseph F. Cassar Galea (Nationalist)
1971	Lorry Sant (Labour)	John Dalli (Labour)	Paul Carachi (Labour)	Alfred Bonnici (Nationalist)	Joseph F. Cassar Galea (Nationalist)
1976	Agatha Barbara (Labour)	Wistin Abela (Labour)	George W. Vella (Labour)	Josie (Joseph) Muscat (Nationalist)	Alexander Cachia Zammit (Nationalist)
1981	Agatha Barbara (Labour)	Wistin Abela (Labour)	George W. Vella (Labour)	Josie (Joseph) Muscat (Nationalist)	Alexander Cachia Zammit (Nationalist)
1987	Alfred (Freddie) Portelli (Labour)	Wistin Abela (Labour)	Joe Buttigieg (Labour)	Joseph (Joe) Psaila Savona (Nationalist)	Renato Agius Muscat (Nationalist)
1992	Alfred (Freddie) Portelli (Labour)	Wistin Abela (Labour)	George Vella (Labour)	Mario Galea (Nationalist)	Joe Psaila Savona (Nationalist)
1996	Alfred Portelli (Labour)	Carmelo Abela (Labour)	Helena Dalli (Labour)	Francis Agius (Nationalist)	Joe Psaila Savona (Nationalist)
1998	George Vella (Labour)	Carmelo Abela (Labour)	Helena Dalli (Labour)	Francis Agius (Nationalist)	Mario Galea (Nationalist)
2003	George Vella (Labour)	Carmelo Abela (Labour)	Helena Dalli (Labour)	Francis Agius (Nationalist)	Mario Galea (Nationalist)
2008	George Vella (Labour)	Carmelo Abela (Labour)	Helena Dalli (Labour)	Carmelo Mifsud Bonnici (Nationalist)	Mario Galea (Nationalist)
2013	George Vella (Labour)	Carmelo Abela (Labour)	Helena Dalli (Labour)	Chris Fearne (Labour)	Mario Galea (Nationalist)
2017	Silvio Grixti (Labour)	Carmelo Abela (Labour)	Helena Dalli (Labour)	Chris Fearne (Labour)	Mario Galea (Nationalist)
2022	Andy Ellul (Labour)	Carmelo Abela (Labour)	Ray Abela (Labour)	Chris Fearne (Labour)	Carmelo Mifsud Bonnici (Nationalist)
