= Alfredo Caruana Gatto =

Maltese lawyer, politician and naturalist

Count Alfredo Caruana Gatto
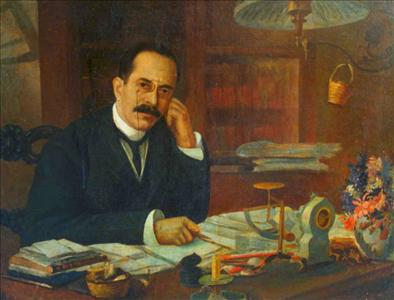
- Portrait by Edward Caruana Dingli, c. 1920

Minister of Justice
- In office 28 October 1921 – May 1922
- Prime Minister: Joseph Howard

Personal details
- Born: 3 September 1868 Valletta, Crown Colony of Malta
- Died: 15 October 1926 (aged 58)
- Party: Maltese Political Union (until 1926); Nationalist Party (1926)
- Parents: Antonio Caruana Gatto (father); Vincenza Formosa (mother)
- Education: University of Malta
- Occupation: Lawyer

Count Alfredo Caruana Gatto (3 September 1868 – 15 October 1926) was a Maltese lawyer, politician and naturalist.

He was born on 3 September 1868 in Valletta to Antonio Caruana Gatto and Vincenza Formosa. He studied at the University of Malta, graduating with a BA in 1889 and a LL.D. in 1892. He specialised in criminal law, and he was briefly appointed assistant crown advocate in 1901.

Caruana Gatto was an avid naturalist with a particular interest in botany and ornithology, and he was a member of the Società botanica italiana, the Société Botanique de Paris and the Linnean Society of London. He contributed to The Mediterranean Naturalist between 1891 and 1893, wrote a paper for the 1892 International Botanical Congress in Genoa, and co-authored the 1915 book Flora melitensis nova with Stefano Sommier.

Caruana Gatto was a member of several government committees throughout his career. He later entered politics, joining the Maltese Political Union (UPM) party under the leadership of Ignazio Panzavecchia. He was elected to the Senate of Malta as a representative of the nobility in the 1921 election, and he was Minister of Justice between 1921 and 1922. In 1926, he joined the Nationalist Party when the latter was formed from the merger of the UPM with the Democratic Nationalist Party. He remained a Senator until his death.

On 1 April 1926, Caruana Gatto allegedly purchased two sheets of a newly-issued postage stamp with a unique printing error which were then sold to speculators for a profit. He died a few months later on 15 October 1926 at the age of 58. A minor controversy later arose about how the stamps had been acquired, but the findings of a 1930 investigation on the matter by a government-appointed committee were inconclusive.
