= Michael Piccinino =

Maltese lawyer and politician

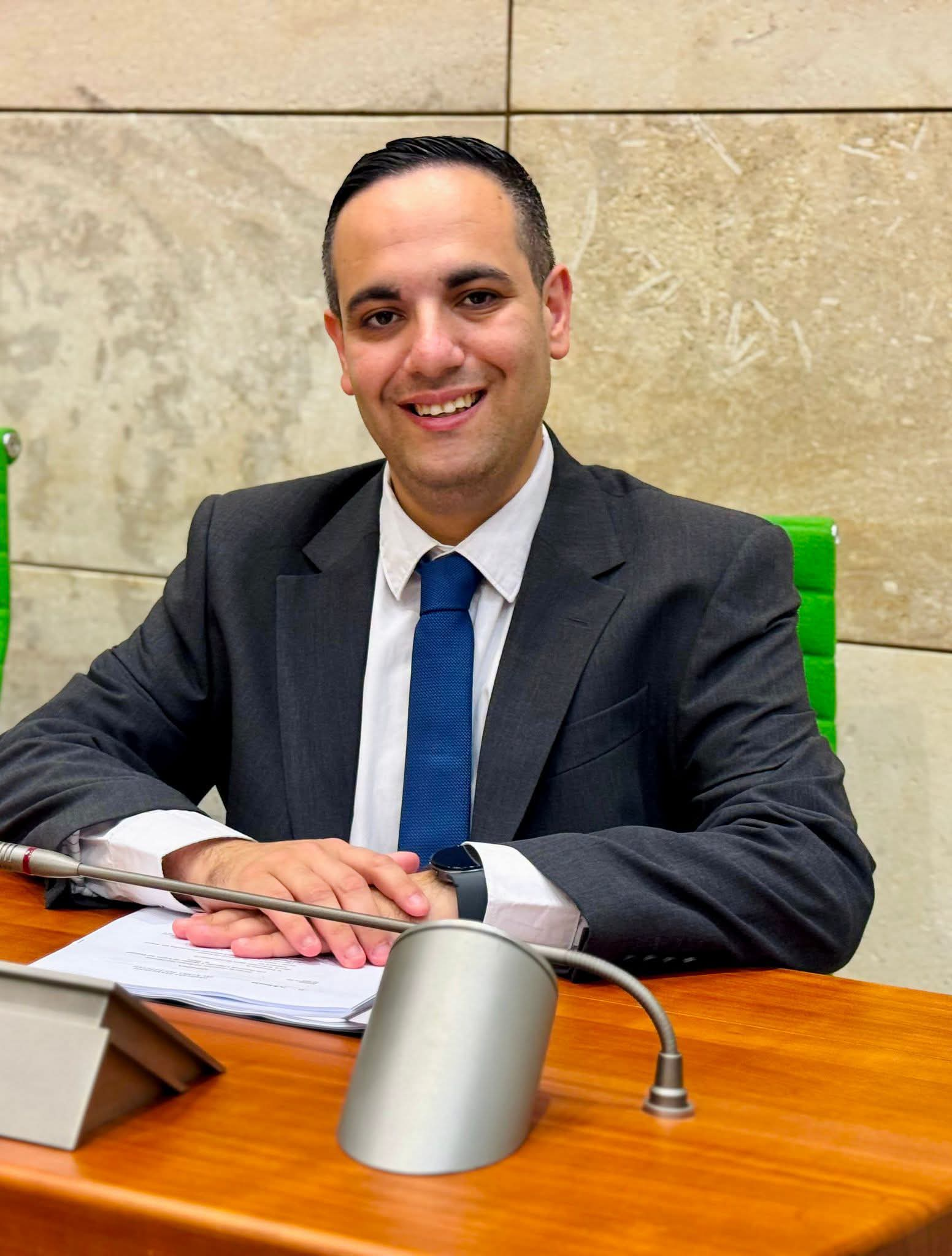

Member of the House of Representatives of Malta
- Incumbent
- Assumed office 20 June 2026
- Constituency: District 4

Secretary-General of the Nationalist Party
- In office 29 July 2021 – 13 March 2025
- Preceded by: Francis Zammit Dimech
- Succeeded by: Charles Bonello

Personal details
- Party: Nationalist Party
- Education: University of Malta
- Profession: Lawyer

Michael Piccinino is a Maltese lawyer and politician who has served as a member of the House of Representatives of Malta for the Nationalist Party since 2026. He represents District 4, having been elected at the 2026 Maltese general election.

Piccinino previously served as secretary-general of the Nationalist Party from July 2021 until March 2025.

== Education and career ==
Piccinino studied at the University of Malta, where he completed a Bachelor of Laws (Honours) and subsequently a Master of Advocacy.

In 2018, he completed an LL.B. dissertation entitled An analysis of the appointment and functions of the Broadcasting Authority.

He later obtained a postgraduate diploma in Human Rights, Law and Practice. He also completed a master's degree in Knowledge-Based Entrepreneurship at the University of Malta.

Piccinino is a lawyer by profession. TVM News reported that he qualified as a lawyer in March 2020.

While studying at the University of Malta, Piccinino was elected as the student representative on the university's Senate in March 2018. He received 658 votes and was elected for a two-year term beginning on 2 March 2018.

Michael Piccinino is a Maltese lawyer and politician who has served as a member of the House of Representatives of Malta for the Nationalist Party since 2026. He represents District 4, having been elected at the 2026 Maltese general election.

Piccinino previously served as secretary-general of the Nationalist Party from July 2021 until March 2025.

== Youth and civic involvement ==
Before taking senior roles within the Nationalist Party, Piccinino was active in youth organisations.

He served as president of Malta's National Youth Council.

During his presidency, Piccinino advocated extending voting rights to 16- and 17-year-olds in national and European Parliament elections.

The National Youth Council was subsequently among the organisations that campaigned for the extension of voting rights to 16-year-olds, which was enacted in 2018.

In 2018, Piccinino was appointed to the Malta Council for the Voluntary Sector for its 2018–2020 term, representing the National Youth Council.

In November 2018, he was elected as a board member of the European Youth Forum for its 2019–2020 mandate.

During his board term, he worked on youth participation and representation policy, including work related to the implementation of the EU Youth Strategy.

== Political career ==
=== Nationalist Party ===
Piccinino held a number of organisational roles within the Nationalist Party before becoming its secretary-general.

On 19 November 2020, he was elected Executive Organisational Secretary of the party with 50 votes in favour and two against. The role included membership of the party's Executive Committee, Administrative Council and Management Committee.

TVM News reported that before this appointment he had served in several roles within the party's Paola sectional committee, had represented fourth-district committees on the PN Executive for five years and had served as the party's Political Coordinator earlier in 2020.

On 29 July 2021, the party's executive committee approved his appointment as secretary-general. He received 77 votes in favour, eight against and one abstention, succeeding Francis Zammit Dimech.

Piccinino was 26 when he became secretary-general. The Nationalist Party has described him as its youngest secretary-general since the Second World War. Contemporary reporting noted that he was younger than Louis Galea, who had taken up the post aged 29 in 1977.

Piccinino was subsequently confirmed as secretary-general in another election for Nationalist Party officials, receiving 66 votes in favour, one against and one abstention.

During Piccinino's tenure as secretary-general, the Nationalist Party improved its performance in the 2024 European Parliament and local council elections. In the 2024 European Parliament election in Malta, the party regained a third seat in the European Parliament, increasing its representation from two to three MEPs. The gap between the Nationalist Party and the Labour Party fell from approximately 42,000 votes in the 2019 European Parliament election to 8,454 votes in 2024.

MaltaToday reported that during Piccinino's tenure the PN recorded its highest vote total in a European Parliament election since Malta began holding them, reduced the gap with Labour to its smallest margin in 16 years, gained eight new mayors and local council majorities, and saw NET Television consistently outperform ONE for the first time.

Independent reporting on the 2024 local council elections recorded that the PN regained control of San Ġwann, Siġġiewi, St Paul's Bay and Mosta, gained majorities in Msida and Żebbuġ, Gozo, and became the largest party in Mellieħa and Birkirkara, although without an outright seat majority in the latter two localities.

In 2024, Piccinino announced his intention to step down as secretary-general in order to contest the next general election.

He left the position in March 2025 and was succeeded by Charles Bonello.

=== 2026 general election ===
Piccinino contested the 2026 Maltese general election as a Nationalist Party candidate in District 4. It was the first general election he had contested.

He was elected on 31 May 2026.

His election contributed to the Nationalist Party securing two seats in the fourth district for the first time since the 2008 general election, ending an 18-year period in which the party had returned only one MP from the district.

Piccinino took the oath of allegiance as a member of parliament on 20 June 2026.

== Member of Parliament ==
Piccinino represents District 4 in the Fifteenth Legislature as a member of the Nationalist Party parliamentary group.

Following the 2026 general election, Piccinino was appointed Shadow Minister for the Self-Employed, Small Enterprises and Cooperatives.

In an interview following his election, Piccinino identified reducing administrative burdens on small businesses and the self-employed as one of the priorities of his shadow portfolio. He also called for reforms to Malta's legislation governing cooperatives.

=== Parliamentary roles ===
Piccinino serves on the House of Representatives' Standing Committee on Information Technology and Artificial Intelligence Affairs.

The committee was established to consider matters relating to information technology and artificial intelligence.

Piccinino is also a member of Malta's parliamentary delegation to the Parliamentary Assembly of the Council of Europe.

== Electoral history ==
Election	District	Party	Result
2026 general election	District 4	Nationalist Party	Elected
