= Edwin Grech =

Maltese Gynecologist and politician (1928–2023)

Edwin Grech (27 September 1928 – 15 March 2023) was a Maltese doctor and politician from the Labour Party.

== Career ==
Grech was elected to the Parliament of Malta from District 2 in 1992 and 1996. He was Minister of Social Security from 1996 to 1998.

== Death ==
He died in 2023. His funeral was attended by Prime Minister Robert Abela, other ministers and former prime minister Joseph Muscat.

== Family ==
His daughter Karin Grech was murdered in 1977 by a letter bomb. His nephew Bernard Grech was leader of the Nationalist Party from 2020 until his resignation in 2025.
