= 1883 Maltese general election =

- 8–11 October 1883

8 of the 18 seats to the Government Council
	First party
Party	Anti-Reform Party
Last election	5
Seats won	7
Seat change	▲2

General elections were held in Malta between 8 and 11 October 1883. All but one of the elected Council members were members of the Anti-Reform Party.

== Background ==
The elections were held under the 1849 constitution, which provided for an 18-member Government Council, of which ten members would be appointed and eight elected.

== Results ==
A total of 10,637 people were registered to vote, of which just 2,749 cast votes, giving a turnout of 26%.

Elected members
Name	Votes	Party	Notes
Dun Pawl Agius	1,051	Anti-Reform Party	
Vincenzo Bugeja	504		
Kirton Cooper	605	Anti-Reform Party	
Arturo Barbaro	696	Anti-Reform Party	
Carl Maria Muscat	1,103	Anti-Reform Party	
Fortunato Mizzi	270	Anti-Reform Party	Re-elected from Gozo
Agostini Naudi	822	Anti-Reform Party	Re-elected
Zaccaria Roncali	899	Anti-Reform Party	
Source: Schiavone, p177
