= Manuel Borda =

Maltese economist and former politician

Manuel Borda is a Maltese economist and former politician from the Nationalist Party.

== Career ==
He was elected to the Parliament of Malta in the 1987 election in District 2.

== Bibliography ==
- Free at Last! The Road to Reconciliation (2013)
- The Wide Road to Destruction – The Downfall of the Privileged (2011)
