= Francesco Buhagiar =

Prime Minister of Malta (1876-1934)

2nd Prime Minister of Malta
- In office 13 October 1923 – 22 September 1924
- Monarch: George V
- Governors-General: Lord Plumer; Walter Congreve
- Preceded by: Joseph Howard
- Succeeded by: Ugo Mifsud

Personal details
- Born: 7 September 1876 Qrendi, Malta
- Died: 27 June 1934 (aged 57) St. Julian's, Malta
- Party: Political Union
- Spouse: Enrichetta Said
- Children: 5

Francesco Buhagiar (7 September 1876 – 27 June 1934) was the second Prime Minister of Malta (1923–1924). He was elected from the Maltese Political Union.

== Biography ==
Son of Michele Buhagiar and Filomena Mifsud, Francesco Buhagiar was born in Qrendi on 7 September 1876. He graduated in Law from the Royal University of Malta in 1901 and started a career as a lawyer in civil and commercial law.

After twenty years practicing law, with Malta's self-rule Buhagiar, was elected to the Legislative Assembly at the 1921 election on the list of Ignazio Panzavecchia's Unione Politica Maltese (UPM). From October 1922 he served as Minister of Justice, and one year later was appointed to replace Joseph Howard as prime minister. He led a minority government throughout 1924, on the run-up and follow-up to the June 1924 election, in which the UPM only got 10 seats.

He was then appointed as judge of the Superior Courts, where he served until 1934.

He died at 57 of complications from appendicitis at the Blue Sisters Hospital and was buried at the Addolorata Cemetery.

Francesco Buhagiar was married to Enrichetta Said and they had five children. He is remembered as an accomplished jurist, a practical man and a highly respected politician.

== See also ==
- Prime Minister of Malta
- List of prime ministers of Malta
