= Michael Dundon =

Maltese politician

The Honourable Michael Dundon MP

Leader of the Labour Party
- In office 16 August 1927 – 29 November 1928
- Preceded by: William Savona
- Succeeded by: Paul Boffa

Minister for Health
- In office 1 April 1922 – 2 January 1923
- Prime Minister: Joseph Howard
- Preceded by: Carm Mifsud
- Succeeded by: Carm Mifsud

Personal details
- Born: 12 November 1854 County Limerick, Ireland
- Died: 5 April 1936 (aged 81) Valletta, Crown Colony of Malta
- Resting place: Addolorata Cemetery, Paola
- Party: Labour Party
- Spouse(s): Rebecca Madrona (1885–1918)
- Children: 2

Military service
- Allegiance: United Kingdom
- Branch/service: Royal Army Medical Corps
- Years of service: 1881–1907; 1914–1918
- Rank: Lieutenant Colonel
- Battles/wars: Second Boer War; World War I

Dr Michael Dundon (November 12, 1854 – April 5, 1936) was a Maltese politician of Irish birth. He was the 7th surviving child of William and Ellen Dundon, Barnakyle, Patrickswell, County Limerick, Ireland. He was educated at Queen's College, Cork, and at the Cecilia Street Hospital, Dublin, and graduated as M.D., M.Ch. of the Queen's, afterwards the Royal, University of Ireland, in 1876. Entering the Army as surgeon on 30 July 1881, he became lieutenant-colonel in the Royal Army Medical Corp after 20 years' service, and retired on 11 December 1907. He served in the South African War from 1899 to 1901, and took part in operations in the Orange Free State (including actions at Hautnek and Zand River) and in the Transvaal (including actions at Johannesburg and Pretoria and in Cape Colony) and received the Queen's medal with four clasps. Following his service in South Africa he was stationed in Malta. He rejoined for service in the war of 1914–18.

He became the first leader in Parliament of the Maltese Labour Party from 1926 to 1927 serving as Minister for health from 1926 to 1927. He resigned his position of party leader on 29 November 1927 for health reasons and was succeeded by Dr Paul Boffa. He was married on 7 July 1885 to Rebecca Madrona (died 14 January 1918) and had two children, Francis Michael Dundon (died 10 August 1888, aged 17 months) and Ellen Rebecca Dundon (died 4 October 1980). He is buried in the Addolorata Cemetery in Paola and has a bridge dedicated to him.

Political offices
Preceded by William Savona	Leader of the Malta Labour Party; 1927–1928	Succeeded by Paul Boffa
