= Stephen Spiteri =

Stephen Spiteri may refer to:

- Stephen C. Spiteri, Maltese military historian
- Stephen Spiteri (politician), Maltese politician
