= Enrico Mizzi =

Prime Minister of Malta in 1950

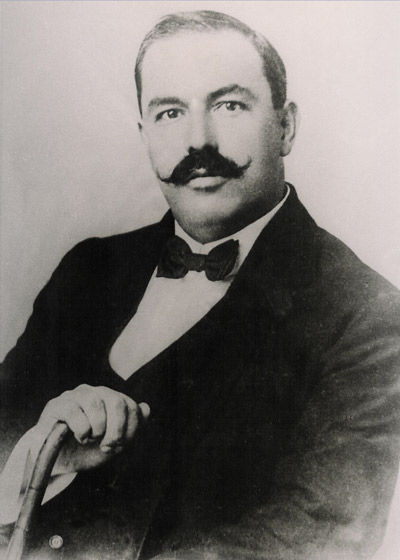

6th Prime Minister of Malta
- In office 26 September 1950 – 20 December 1950
- Monarch: George VI
- Governor General: Gerald Creasy
- Preceded by: Paul Boffa
- Succeeded by: Giorgio Borġ Olivier

Personal details
- Born: 20 September 1885 Valletta, Malta
- Died: 20 December 1950 (aged 65) Valletta, Malta
- Party: Nationalist Party
- Other political affiliations: PDN until 1926
- Spouse: Bice Mizzi (m. 1926)
- Children: 1
- Relatives: Fortunato Mizzi (father)

Enrico Mizzi (Maltese: Nerik Mizzi) (20 September 1885 – 20 December 1950) was a Maltese politician, leader of the Maltese Nationalist Party from 1926 and briefly Prime Minister of Malta in 1950.

== Life ==
Born on 20 September 1885 in Valletta, Enrico Mizzi was the son of Maria Sofia (Marie Sophie) Folliero de Luna, daughter of the vice-consul of Naples, and of Fortunato Mizzi, a pro-Italian Maltese politician, founder of the Partit Anti-Riformista. His mother died in 1903 and his father in 1905, when Enrico was only 17 and 19 respectively.

Enrico studied in the Gozo seminary, and read law at the University of Rome La Sapienza and at the University of Urbino. He graduated in literature and science at the Royal University of Malta in 1906, and in Law at Urbino in 1911.

In 1926 Enrico Mizzi married Bice Vassallo; they had one son, Fortunat Mizzi (1927–2017), who became a priest in 1952 and founded the Moviment Azzjoni Socjali (MAS) in 1955.

== Politics ==
Despite completing his legal studies in Rome, Mizzi had little chance to practice law. He was drawn instead to politics and journalism. In 1915 Enrico Mizzi was elected member of the Comitato Patriottico Maltese and founded the newspaper L'Eco di Malta, organ of the Committee itself.

He stood as a parliamentary candidate for Gozo in 1915, and was elected. He worked to develop a Constitution that was independent of English rule at the time.

In 1916 he was arrested and sentenced to a year in prison for proclaiming himself a representative of the Italian nationality of Malta – his sentence was reduced to a reprimand by the Governor of the time due to suspected interference. In May 1917 he was arrested and court-martialled for sedition during wartime, found guilty of all charges and imprisoned for a year. Although this sentence was again reduced, he lost his right to practice law in the country.

=== Leader of the Partit Nazzjonalista ===
In his youth, Enrico Mizzi decided to follow in the footsteps of his father Fortunato Mizzi, who was a member of the Pro-Italian Maltese community, whose political activity showed strong support towards Italy's Risorgimento and the official use of the Italian language in Malta.

Mizzi was first elected to the Council of Government from Gozo in 1915 as Member of the Comitato Patriottico. While Mizzi was striving to obtain a liberal Constitution he was arrested at his residence on 7 May and court-martialled on charges of sedition in 1917 under the Malta Defence Regulations for writings and statements against the British. He was sentenced to a year's imprisonment with hard labour, the loss of civil rights and the withdrawal of lawyer's warrant. The sentence was commuted by Governor Methuen to a "severe censure", while his civil rights and warrant were restored following the cessation of hostilities in 1918. Mizzi founded the Circolo Giovane Malta and was life president of the Societa' Dante Alighieri.

After the end of the First World War, Mizzi was part of the large and moderate coalition called the Maltese Political Union (Unjoni Politika Maltija, UPM), led by Ugo Pasquale Mifsud. It splintered from it, together with the more extremist and pro-Italian current, to form the Democratic Nationalist Party (Partit Demokratiku Nazzjonalista, PDN), led by Mizzi.

The two movements participated separately in the 1921 Maltese general election, but adopted a form of desistance so as not to damage each other; the PDN elected 4 MPs from Gozo.

UPM and PDN run once again separately, albeit in coalition, in the 1924 elections. After the elections of 1924, Mizzi's party formed a government in coalition with the Unione Politica Maltese and they elected 15 parliamentary seats. During this legislature, Mizzi was the Minister for Postal Services, Agriculture and Fisheries together with Industry and Commerce.

On 23 January 1926 the two parties joined together to form the Partit Nazzjonalista, with Mizzi and Mifsud serving as co-leaders until the death of the latter in 1942.

However, the new unitary party was defeated by the elections of 1927, in favor of the Compact, the electoral alliance between the Maltese Constitutional Party and Labour.

In the years from 1924 to 1933 Mizzi held numerous ministerial positions and was president of the Dante Alighieri Society and director of the Gazzetta maltese in his capacity as a promoter of the Italian character of Malta.

Mizzi the "knight without stain or fear". remained well known for promoting Maltese patriotism and nationalism at a time when Malta was a colony. He was also associated with the Italianate identity of the Maltese people, the cause for selecting Italian as an official language of the country, and a strong proponent of the Roman Catholic faith in opposition to the Protestant faith of the colonial authorities.

=== Deportation to Uganda ===
On 30 May 1940, while Mizzi was at the Malta Printing Press, he was arrested and together with 47 other Maltese was interned for having Italian sympathies. In February 1942, Governor Dobbie took out a warrant to illegally deport 47 Maltese to Uganda, Mizzi amongst them. During his exile, Mizzi did all he could to remain up to date on events in Malta. He remained in close contact with other members of the Partit Nazzjonalista, such as Gorg Borg Olivier and Giuseppe Schembri.

=== Reform of the Partit Nazzjonalista ===
The group of exiles were allowed back into the country on 8 March 1945. Mizzi quickly re-entered politics, and attended the Council Sitting on 15 March. Mizzi planned to reorganise the PN from the ground up. The ideology of the Party, and its support of Italian culture and language formed the basalt of this, and was frequently used against him by his political enemies. Between 1939 and 1942, the Times of Malta and Il-Berqa, two newspapers owned by Gerald Strickland, called him a quisling and a sympathiser of Italian Fascism.

=== Prime Minister of Malta ===
At the 1950 elections the Partit Nazzjonalista reported a great success and Mizzi was appointed Prime Minister in a hung parliament. He died in Valletta just three months later, on 20 December 1950, and had a state funeral. To date, he is the only Maltese prime minister to have died in office.

== Legacy ==
Mizzi is remembered by the Maltese as a contributing force in the Maltese national and European identity.

I hope that when I pass from this life to become a memory to posterity I hope no one will slander me... for party reasons.... As I had been declared by the Nationalist Party some thirty years ago, I am still, thank God, before the Party, before the people, and above all else before my own conscience 'senza macchia e senza paura'.

— Enrico Mizzi

The Central Bank of Malta issued a silver proof coin with Enrico Mizzi's head on it as part of its Distinguished Maltese Personalities Series in 2001.

A foundation, to promote and better appreciate his life and works and that of his father, Fortunato, was established in 2010.

== See also ==
- List of prime ministers of Malta
- Italia irredenta
- Italian irredentism in Malta

Political offices
Preceded by Paul Boffa	Prime Minister of Malta; 1950	Succeeded by George Borg Olivier
