= Stanley Zammit =

Maltese politician

Stanley Zammit is a Maltese politician from the Nationalist Party. He has been a Member of Parliament representing District 5 since the 2022 Maltese general election.

== See also ==
- List of members of the parliament of Malta, 2022–2026
