= Democratic Nationalist Party (Malta, 1921–1926) =

Democratic Nationalist Party Partito Democratico Nazionalista
- Founder: Fortunato Mizzi
- Founded: 1883
- Dissolved: 16 January 1926
- Merged into: Nationalist Party
- Ideology: Conservatism; Italophilia

The Democratic Nationalist Party (Italian: Partito Democratico Nazionalista) was a conservative political party in Malta.

== History ==
The party was established in 1883 as the Anti-Reform Party (Partito Anti-Reformista) by Fortunato Mizzi. It won seven of the eight seats in the Government Council in the elections that year.

In 1903 it was renamed the National Party (Partito Nazionale). In 1921 it was succeeded by the Democratic Nationalist Party, set up by Enrico Mizzi (son of Fortunato) to absorb the old party. It won only four of the 32 seats in the 1921 elections, and five in the 1924 elections.

Due to its lack of success, the party merged with the Maltese Political Union on 16 January 1926 to form the Nationalist Party.

== Ideology ==
As the Anti-Reform Party, the party sought to preserve Italian as the language of education, government and law, and was in favour of the church retaining its power. It was largely supported by wealthy urban professionals. When it became the National Party in 1903, the party operated a policy of non-cooperation with the British authorities.

The Democratic Nationalist Party aimed to widen its supporter base by promoting social welfare, but retained its commitment to making the Italian language an official language alongside English.

== Election results ==
Election	Leader	Votes	%	Seats	+/–	Position	Status
1921	Enrico Mizzi	2,465	12.0	4 / 32	–	4th	Opposition
1924	Enrico Mizzi	4,188	17.4	5 / 32	▲1	4th	Coalition government
