= Fortunato Mizzi =

Maltese politician (1844–1905)

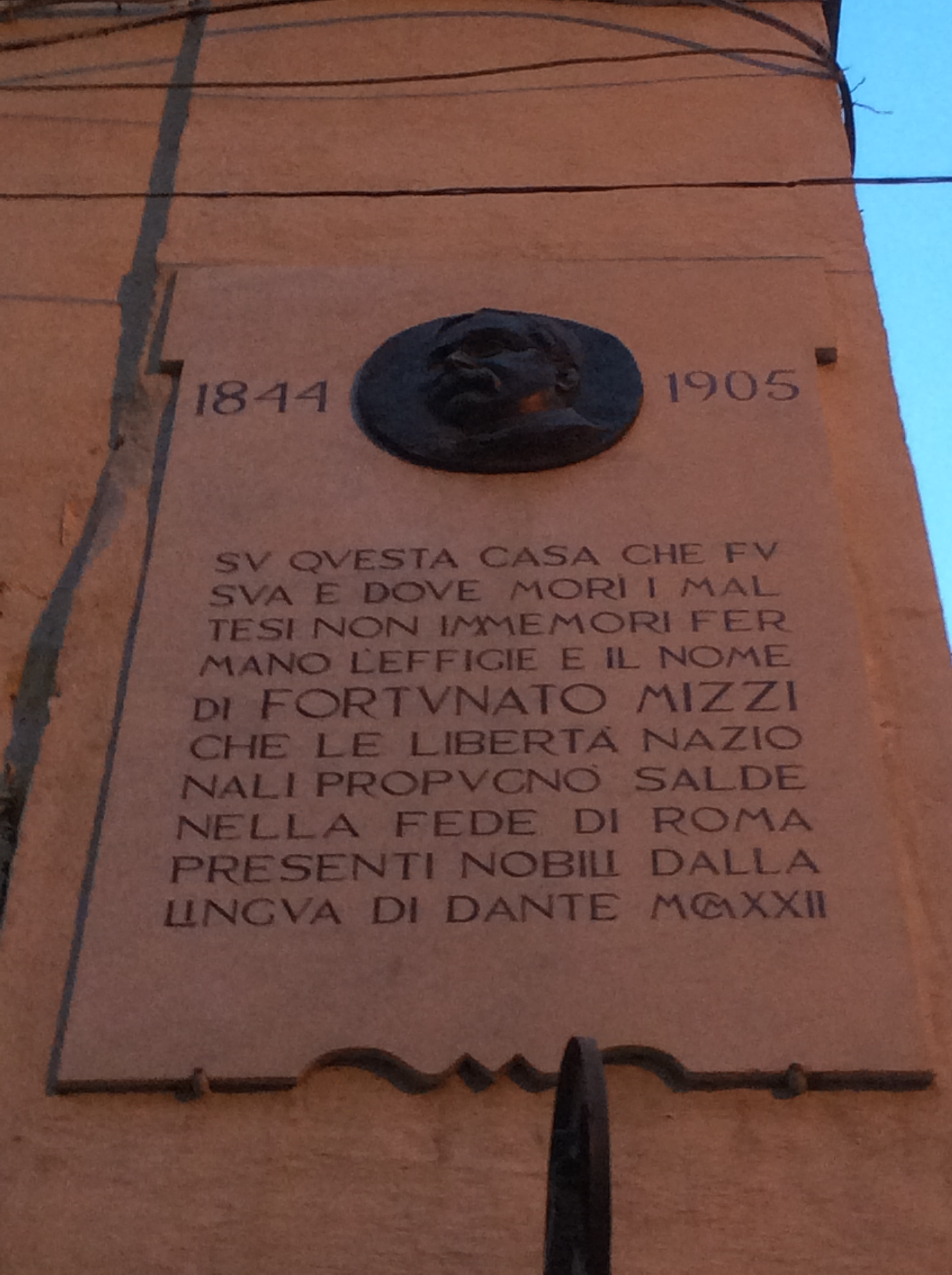
Plaque to Fortunato Mizzi at 15 Old Mint Street in Valletta

Fortunato Mizzi (5 July 1844 – 18 May 1905) was a Maltese lawyer and politician.

== Biography ==
Born of Francesco Mizzi and Marianna Galea, Fortunato Mizzi was a descendant of an old Italian-Maltese family, whose ancestor Pietro Mizzi emigrated to Gozo from Italy in 1655. Mizzi was a member of the Pro-Italian Maltese community and showed in his political activity strong support toward Italy's Risorgimento and in defence of the official use of the Italian language and of Italian culture in Malta.

Mizzi founded the Partito Anti-Riformista in 1880 and, later, the Partito Nazionale (today's Nationalist Party). he would campaign for a new constitution from the one that was made back in 1849.

Mizzi was instrumental to obtain liberal and progressive constitutional changes for the country during the colonial period, and is credited with starting the process which eventually led to Malta's independence.

In 1871 Fortunato Mizzi married Maria Sofia (Marie Sophie) Folliero de Luna (1847–1903), daughter of Giuseppe, vice-consul of Naples. They had a son in 1885 by the name of Enrico (Nerik) who in 1950 became Prime Minister of Malta shortly before dying.

== Memory ==
A lapide (plaque) with an epitaph to the memory of Fortunato Mizzi was placed at Mizzi’s former house at 15 Old Mint Street, Valletta, in 1922. The plaque was inaugurated in 1922 by then-Prime Minister Joseph Howard in the presence of Sir Filippo Sciberras, other members of the National Assembly and a very large crowd of supporters. The epitaph, in Italian, mentioned Fortunato Mizzi having lived and died in that house and exalted his many virtues and his dedication towards the national cause. It carried a bronze effigy of Mizzi in a roundel made by the Russian émigré sculptor Boris Edwards.

A bust of Fortunato Mizzi, inaugurated in 1940, can be seen in the Pincio gardens in Rome alongside the one of Pasquale Paoli.

On 8 June 1940, an anti-Italian protest, stirred by the unveiling of the bust of Fortunato Mizzi at the Pincio gardens in Rome the day before, destroyed the plaque in Valletta.

A new lapide to Fortunato Mizzi was prepared in Italy, sculpted by Orlando Paladino Orlandini, made from white travertine marble, measuring 2 x 1.27 metres per 400 kg weight. It carried an identical replica of the epitaph, flanked by two massive fasces, surmounted by a bronze bust of Mizzi. The replica lapide was meant to be placed at the same place in Valletta once the island fell to Italian forces. Italy declared war on Great Britain and France two days after the protests in Valletta. In 1941, the lapide was moved to the Basilica di Santa Croce in Florence for display amongst the memorials of Italy’s great and mighty. It was moved to storage in 1943 and remained there till 2019, when it was gifted to Malta by the Opera di Santa Croce. It is on display at the Malta at War Museum in Birgu.

In the 1950s, a third plaque was made to Fortunato Mizzi to replace the one vandalised in 1940, and this remains until today in Old Mint Street, Valletta.

== See also ==
- Italian irredentism in Malta
- Italia irredenta
