= William Savona =

Maltese politician (1865–1937)

William (Willie) Savona

Leader of the Labour Party
- In office 30 August 1925 – 16 August 1927
- Succeeded by: Michael Dundon

Minister for Post, Customs, Agriculture and Fisheries
- In office April 1922 – 2 January 1924
- Monarch: George V

Personal details
- Born: 7 January 1865 Valletta, Crown Colony of Malta
- Died: 18 January 1937 (aged 72)
- Party: Labour (PL)
- Spouse: Nusa née Rosenbush
- Parent: Sigismondo Savona (father)

William Savona (7 January 1865 – 18 January 1937) was a Maltese politician. He was the first leader and the founder of the Maltese Labour Party from 1925 to 1927, served as Minister for post, customs, agriculture and fisheries 1922–23. He resigned his position of Partit Laburista in 1927, and was succeeded by Colonel Michael Dundon MD.

Jointed the RMA serving in France and Salonica during World War I, awarded the MBE.

== Family ==
Savona was the son of Sigismondo Savona. Savona was married to Nusa Rosenbush, and had at least two sons and four daughters.

== Education ==
Savona was educated at the Lyceum (Malta), and he later studied law at the University of Malta, graduating in 1886.

== Political life ==
In 1919 he joined the worker's movement becoming vice-president, later president, of the Camera del Lavoro (Labour Party). He was appointed Minister for post, customs, agriculture and fisheries in 1922–23. Savona remained active in politics until 1928.

Savona is buried at the Santa Maria Addolorata Cemetery in Paola, the largest burial ground of Malta, where his father found his final resting place as well.

Political offices
Preceded by founded	Leader of the Malta Labour Party; 1921–1927	Succeeded by Michael Dundon
