= Joseph Howard (prime minister) =

Prime Minister of Malta from 1921 to 1923

Joseph Howard OBE
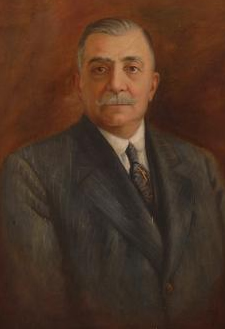

1st Prime Minister of Malta
- In office 26 October 1921 – 13 October 1923
- Monarch: George V
- Governor-General: Lord Plumer
- Preceded by: Position Established
- Succeeded by: Francesco Buhagiar

Personal details
- Born: 4 December 1862 Valletta, Malta
- Died: 20 May 1925 (aged 62–63)
- Party: Political Union

Joseph Howard OBE (4 December 1862 – 20 May 1925) was the first Prime Minister of Malta, holding this office from 1921 to 1923.

== Biography ==
Howard was born in Valletta in 1862. He studied at the Lyceum and abroad, also serving at the French Military academy. Upon return to Malta, he had a career in business in the tobacco industry, up to being appointed director of Cousis Cigarettes. From 1914 to 1925 he served as consul of Japan in Malta and President of the Chamber of Commerce. He also chaired the Società dell'Arte, Manifattura e Commercio and La Società Filarmonica La Valette.

In 1912 Malta's Comitato Patriottico appointed him as member of the Council of Government. He chaired the Government emigration committee, and in 1919 headed the delegation which discussed the employment of Maltese emigrants with the French authorities.

At the 1921 elections Howard joined Msg. Ignazio Panzavecchia's Maltese Political Union (Unjoni Politika Maltija, UPM) and was elected Senator in the first Maltese Parliament. With 14 seats, UPM was the first party, but short of a majority. Governor Lord Plumer offered the premiership to Howard, as Panzavecchia could not accept it. Howard led the first autonomous Maltese government from 1921 to 1923 with the support of the Malta Labour Party, which held 7 seats. According to Rudolf, the appointment of Howard was deemed unusual, as he held personal views closer to the rival Constitutional Party, which also held 7 seats. As a first act in government, Howard proclaimed Roman Catholicism as the official religion of the country (Religion of Malta Declaration Act).

Howard was also made Officer of the British Empire (OBE). He died aged 63 in 1925.

During his premiership mandate, Joseph Muscat paid yearly tribute to Howard on the day of his birth from 2015 to 2018.

The green areas separating Mdina from Rabat have been named Howard Gardens.

== See also ==
- Prime Minister of Malta
- List of prime ministers of Malta
