= 1924 Maltese general election =

- 9–10 June 1924
- 32 seats in the Legislative Assembly; 17 seats needed for a majority
Party	Leader	Vote %	Seats	+/–
Constitutional	Gerald Strickland	33.95	10	+3
Political Union	Francesco Buhagiar	27.23	10	−4
Labour	William Savona	19.24	7	0
PDN	Enrico Mizzi	17.40	5	+1
This lists parties that won seats. See the complete results below.
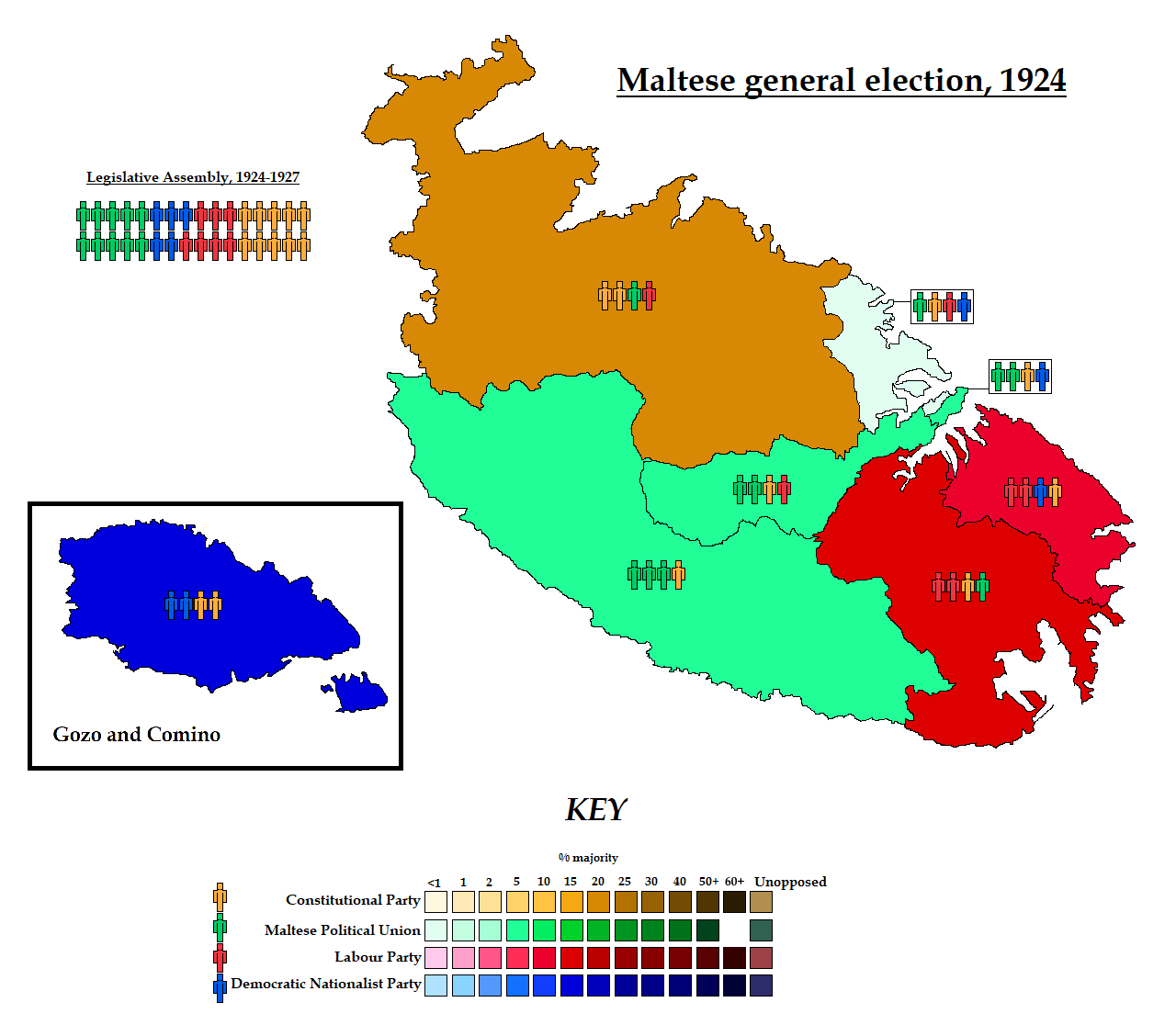
Prime Minister before	Prime Minister after
Francesco Buhagiar; Political Union	Francesco Buhagiar; Political Union

General elections were held in Malta on 9 and 10 June 1924. The Maltese Political Union and the Constitutional Party both won 10 of the 32 seats.

== Electoral system ==
The elections were held using the single transferable vote system in eight four-seat districts. Suffrage was limited to men meeting certain property qualifications.

== Results ==
Party	Votes	%	Seats	+/–
Constitutional Party	8,172	33.95	10	+3
Maltese Political Union	6,553	27.23	10	–4
Labour Party	4,632	19.24	7	0
Democratic Nationalist Party	4,188	17.40	5	+1
Independents	524	2.18	0	0
Total	24,069	100.00	32	0
Valid votes	24,069	99.26		
Invalid/blank votes	179	0.74		
Total votes	24,248	100.00		
Registered voters/turnout	27,101	89.47		
Source: Nohlen & Stöver
