= 1981 Maltese general election =

- 12 December 1981

All 65 seats in the House of Representatives
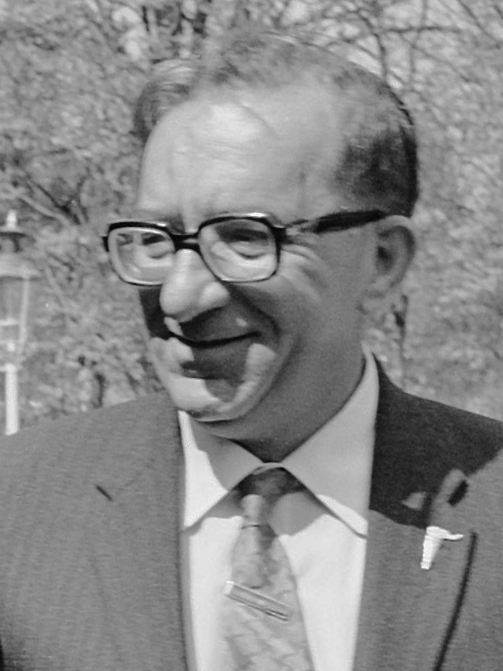

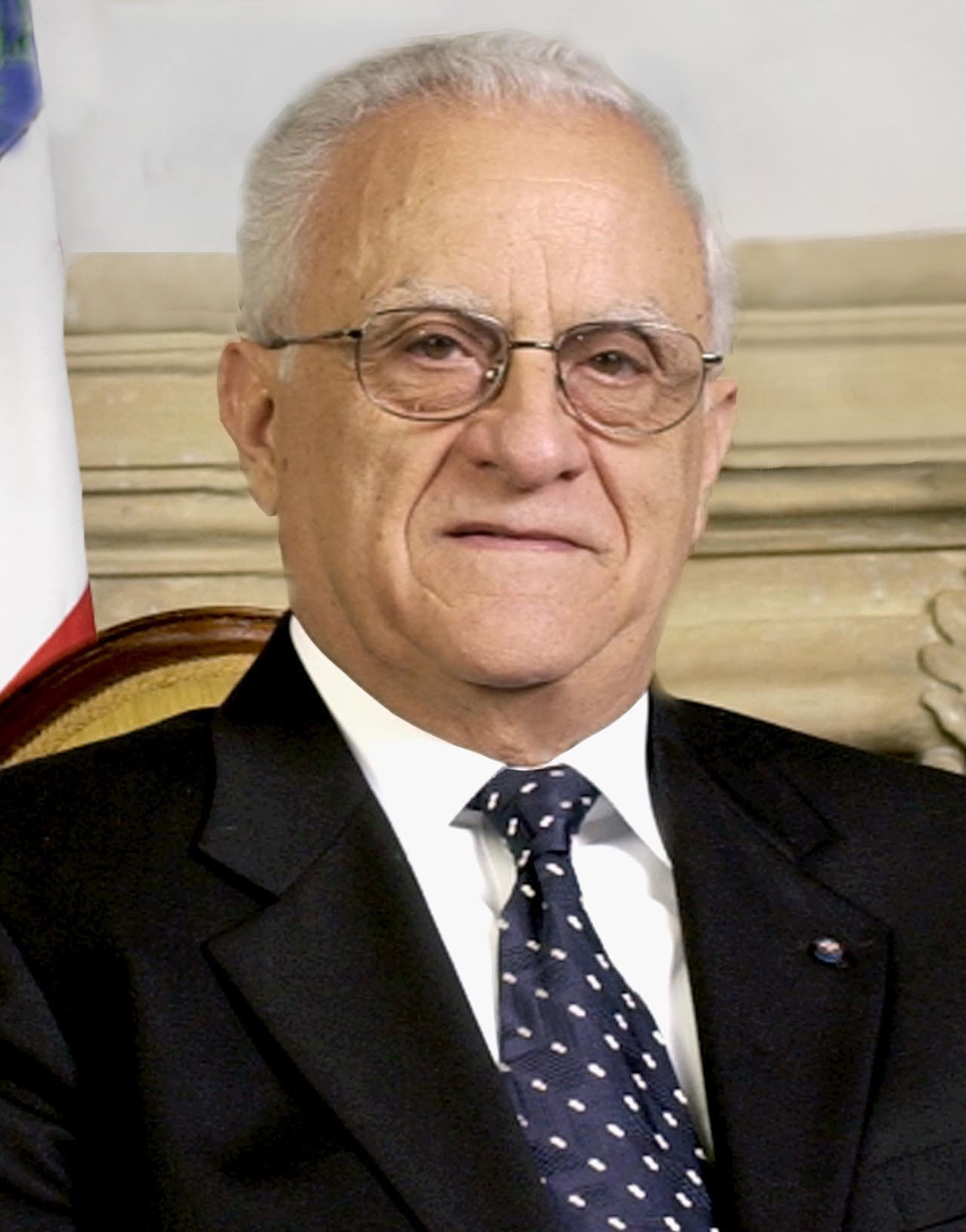
	First party	Second party
Leader	Dom Mintoff	Eddie Fenech Adami
Party	Labour	Nationalist
Last election	51.53%, 34 seats	48.46%, 31 seats
Seats won	34	31
Seat change	Steady	Steady
Popular vote	109,990	114,132
Percentage	49.07%	50.92%
Swing	▼2.46pp	▲2.46pp
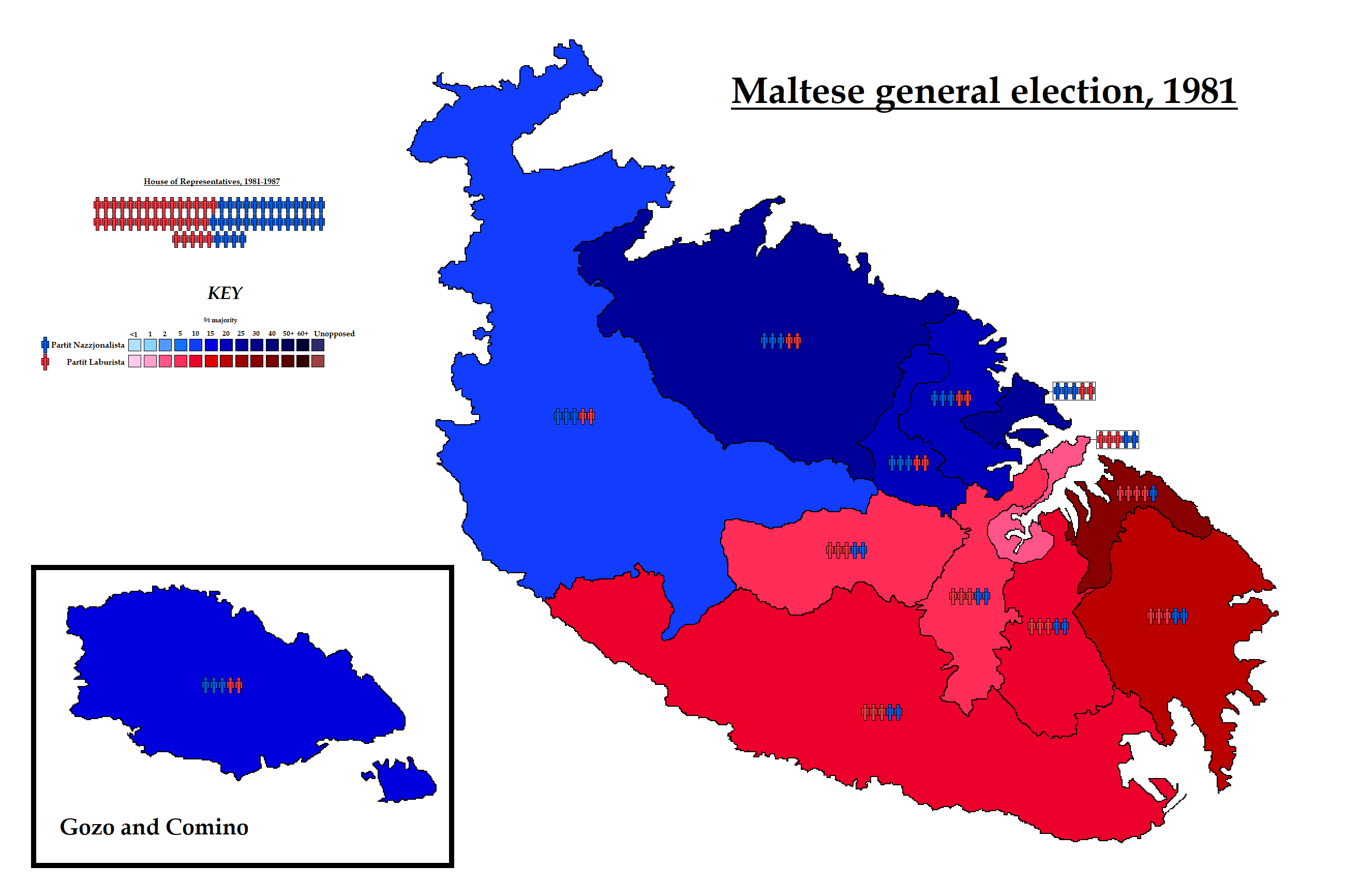
Prime Minister before election
Dom Mintoff
Labour
Elected Prime Minister
Dom Mintoff
Labour

General elections were held in Malta on 12 December 1981.

The opposition Nationalist Party, reinvigorated with a new leader Eddie Fenech Adami, looked set for a serious challenge to the Labour Party, which had been in power since 1971 under Prime Minister Dom Mintoff. However, the elections resulted in controversy because although the Nationalist Party received a majority of votes, the disproportionality of the single transferable vote allowed the Maltese Labour Party to win a majority of seats. Mintoff said he would not be ready to govern in such conditions and hinted that he would call for fresh elections within six months. However, he eventually accepted the President's invitation to form a government and continued in office. This provoked a constitutional crisis, with the Nationalist Party boycotting parliament. The aftermath of the political crisis continued throughout the 1980s, with an increase in political violence in the streets.

Following the elections changes were made to the voting system to prevent a recurrence of the same problem. Under the new system, if a repeat of the 1981 scenario occurred, the party supported by an overall majority of voters would be awarded a sufficient number of additional seats from a party list to give it a majority.

== Electoral system ==
The elections were held using the single transferable vote system, with five-seat constituencies.

== Results ==
Party	Votes	%	Seats	+/–
Nationalist Party	114,132	50.92	31	0
Malta Labour Party	109,990	49.07	34	0
Independents	29	0.01	0	0
Total	224,151	100.00	65	0
Valid votes	224,151	99.42		
Invalid/blank votes	1,315	0.58		
Total votes	225,466	100.00		
Registered voters/turnout	238,239	94.64		
Source: Nohlen & Stöver
