= 1992 Maltese general election =

- 22 February 1992
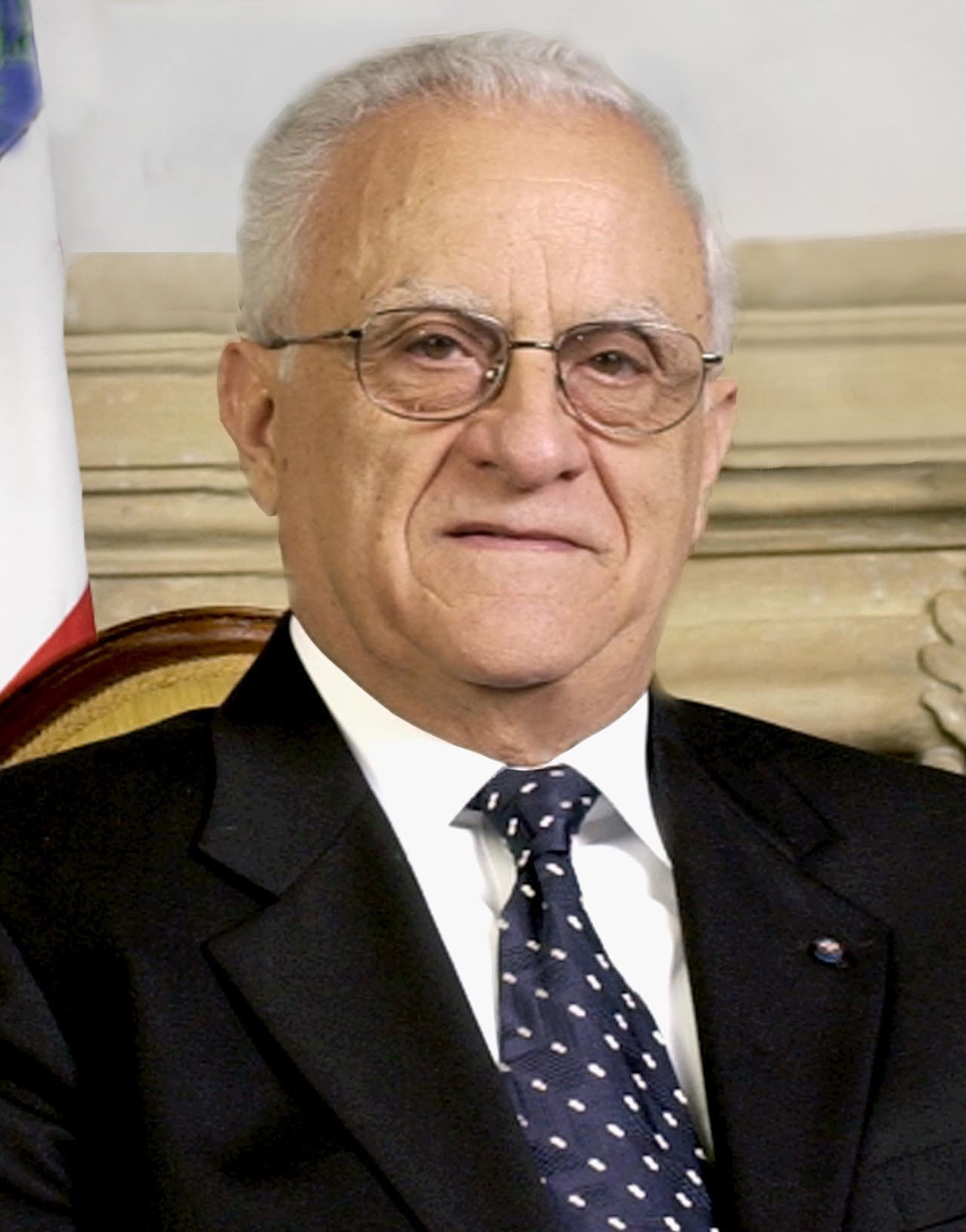
	First party	Second party
Leader	Eddie Fenech Adami	Karmenu Mifsud Bonnici
Party	Nationalist	Labour
Last election	50.91%, 35 seats	48.87%, 34 seats
Seats won	34	31
Seat change	▼1	▼3
Popular vote	127,932	114,911
Percentage	51.77%	46.50%
Swing	▲0.86pp	▼2.37pp
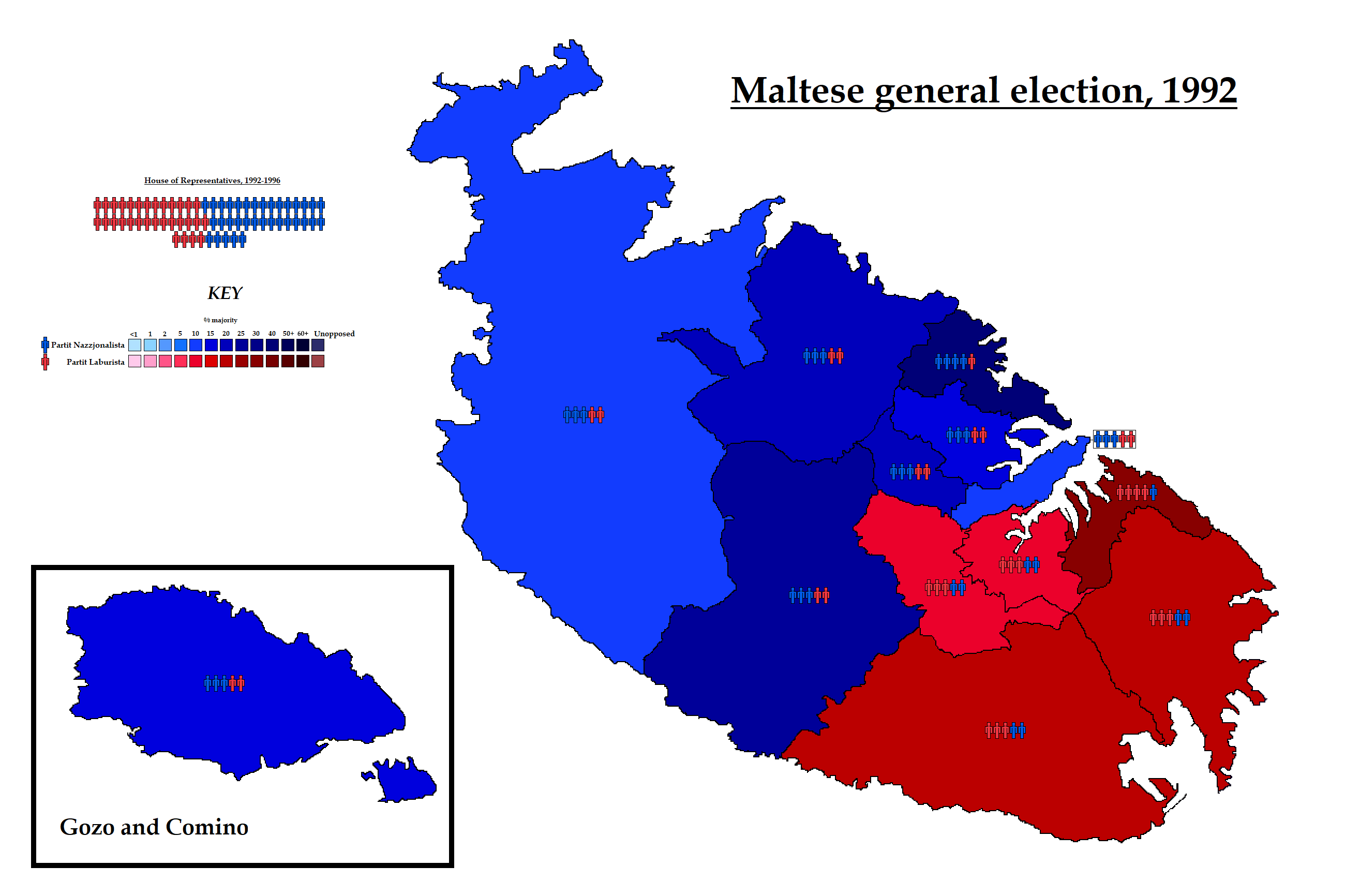
- Results by constituency
Prime Minister before election
Eddie Fenech Adami
Nationalist
Elected Prime Minister
Eddie Fenech Adami
Nationalist

General elections were held in Malta on 22 February 1992. The Nationalist Party remained the largest party, winning 34 of the 65 seats.

The Labour Party performed very poorly, losing by nearly 13,000 votes. Mifsud Bonnici resigned due to deteriorating health and on the 26 March Labour elected Alfred Sant as the new leader.

== Results ==
Party	Votes	%	Seats	+/–
Nationalist Party	127,932	51.77	34	–1
Malta Labour Party	114,911	46.50	31	–3
Democratic Alternative	4,186	1.69	0	New
Independents	110	0.04	0	0
Total	247,139	100.00	65	–4
Valid votes	247,139	99.20		
Invalid/blank votes	2,002	0.80		
Total votes	249,141	100.00		
Registered voters/turnout	259,310	96.08		
Source: Nohlen & Stöver
