= 1921 Maltese general election =

- 18–19 October 1921
- Legislative Assembly
- 32 seats in the Legislative Assembly; 17 seats needed for a majority
Party	Leader	Vote %	Seats
Maltese Political Union	Joseph Howard	39.07	14
Constitutional Party	Gerald Strickland	25.31	7
Labour	William Savona	23.16	7
Democratic Nationalist	Enrico Mizzi	12.04	4
This lists parties that won seats. See the complete results below.
- Senate
- 7 of the 17 seats in the Senate; 4 seats needed for a majority
Party	Vote %	Seats
Maltese Political Union	63.25	4
Labour	22.09	2
Constitutional Party	14.66	1
This lists parties that won seats. See the complete results below.
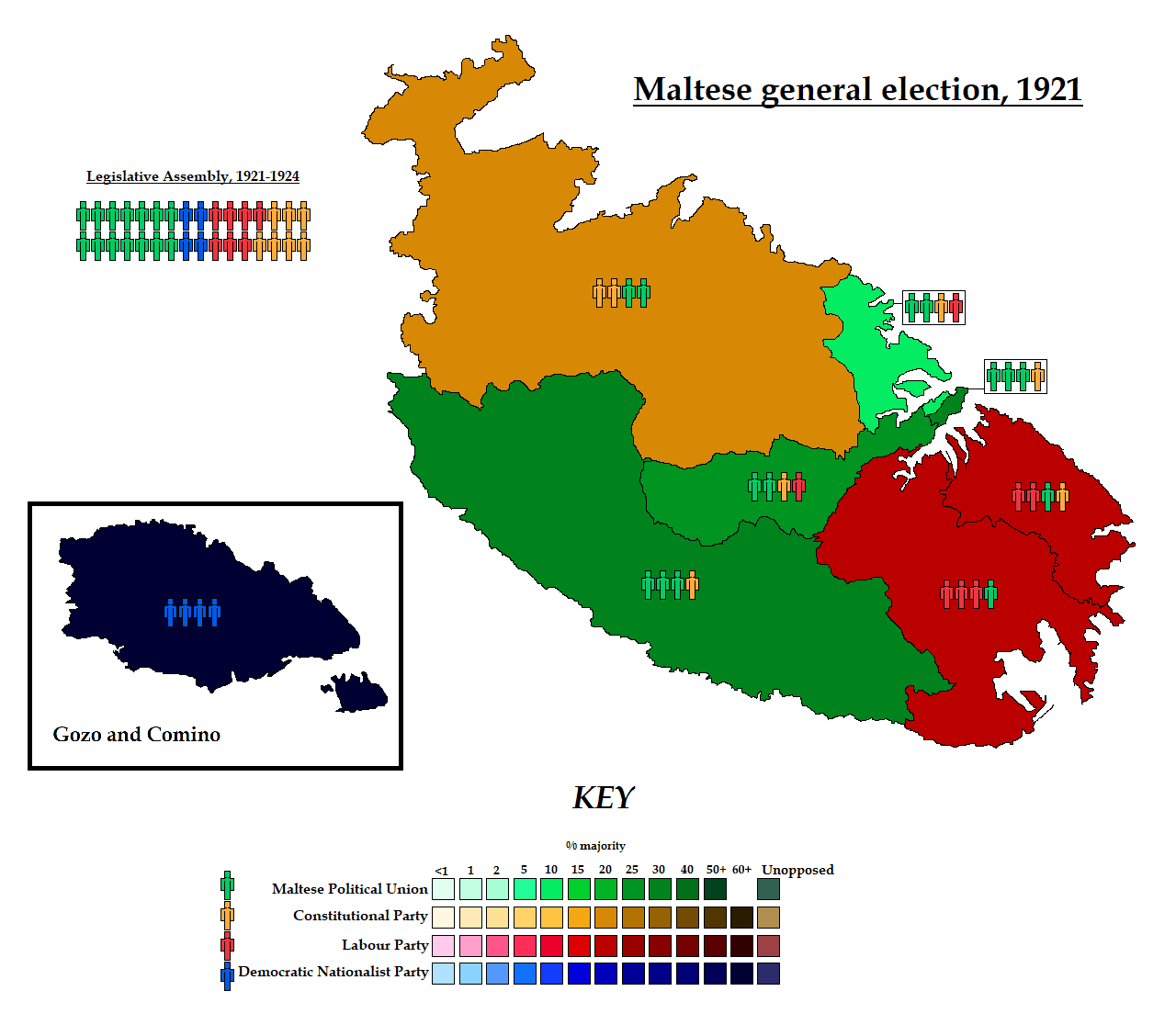
Results by constituency
Prime Minister after
Joseph Howard; Political Union

General elections were held in Malta on 18 and 19 October 1921. The Maltese Political Union emerged as the largest party, winning 14 of the 32 seats in the Legislative Assembly and four of the seven elected seats in the Senate. Joseph Howard became prime minister.

== Electoral system ==
Members of the Legislative Assembly were elected using the single transferable vote system, with four members elected in each of the eight districts. Suffrage was limited to men.

== Results ==
=== Legislative Assembly ===
Party	Votes	%	Seats
Maltese Political Union	7,999	39.07	14
Constitutional Party	5,183	25.31	7
Labour Party	4,742	23.16	7
Democratic Nationalist Party	2,465	12.04	4
Independents	86	0.42	0
Total	20,475	100.00	32
Valid votes	20,475	99.23	
Invalid/blank votes	159	0.77	
Total votes	20,634	100.00	
Registered voters/turnout	27,404	75.30	
Source: Nohlen & Stöver

=== Senate ===
Party	First count		Second count		Seats
Party	Votes	%	Votes	%	Seats
Maltese Political Union	1,611	57.95	1,635	63.25	4
Labour Party	598	21.51	571	22.09	2
Constitutional Party	553	19.89	379	14.66	1
Independents	18	0.65			0
Appointed members					10
Total	2,780	100.00	2,585	100.00	17
Source: Schiavone
