= Maltese Political Union =

Maltese Political Union Unjoni Politika Maltija
- Leader: Joseph Howard
- Founded: 1920
- Dissolved: 16 January 1926
- Merger of: Malta Political Association; Patriotic Committee
- Merged into: Nationalist Party
- Religion: Roman Catholicism

The Maltese Political Union (Italian: Unione Politica Maltese, Maltese: Unjoni Politika Maltija) was a political party in Malta.

== History ==
The party was established in 1920 by a merger of the Malta Political Association and the Patriotic Committee. It emerged as the largest party in Parliament as a result of the 1921 elections, and its leader Joseph Howard became the country's first Prime Minister. Two of the most popular politicians within the party were Enrico Dandria and Ignazio Panzavecchia, both clerics representing the party in Parliament.

The 1924 elections saw the party reduced to ten seats, and it had to form a coalition with the Democratic Nationalist Party to stay in power. On 16 January 1926 the two parties merged to form the Nationalist Party.

In 1947 the Democratic Action Party was established as a revived Maltese Political Union.

== Ideology ==
The party sought to give the Italian language equal status with English in education and to progress towards self-government. It also defended the powers of the Catholic church.

== Election results ==
=== Legislative Assembly ===
Election	Leader	Votes	%	Seats	+/–	Rank	Status
1921	Joseph Howard	7,999	39.07	14 / 32	New	1st	Minority government
1924	Francesco Buhagiar	6,553	27.23	10 / 32	▼4	2nd	Coalition government

=== Senate ===
Election	Leader	First preference		Second preference		Seats	+/–	Rank	Status
Election	Leader	Votes	%	Votes	%	Seats	+/–	Rank	Status
1921	Joseph Howard	1,611	57.95	1,635	63.25	4 / 7	New	1st	Government
