= Nationalist Party (Malta) =

Political party in Malta

Nationalist Party Partit Nazzjonalista
- Abbreviation: PN
- Leader (Kap): Alex Borg
- Deputy leader: Alex Perici Calascione
- Founder: Fortunato Mizzi (Note: Mizzi is the founder of the Partito Democratico Nazionalista and not of the pre-merger Partito Nazionale or the post-merger Partit Nazzjonalista; however, Mizzi is widely accepted as the spiritual founder of the PDN and PN.)
- Founded: 16 January 1926; 100 years ago
- Merger of: Maltese Political Union; Democratic Nationalist Party
- Headquarters: Id-Dar Ċentrali, Triq Herbert Ganado, Pietà
- Newspaper: In-Nazzjon
- Youth wing: Moviment Żgħażagħ Partit Nazzjonalista (MŻPN); Team Start
- Women's wing: Moviment Nisa Partit Nazzjonalista
- Media arm: NET Media
- Worker's wing: Solidarjetà Ħaddiema Partit Nazzjonalista (SĦPN)
- Pensioner's wing: Assoċjazzjoni Pensjonanti Anzjani Nazzjonalisti (APAN)
- Ideology: Christian democracy Conservatism; Historical: National conservatism Italophilia
- Political position: Centre to Centre-right; Historical: Right-wing
- Religion: Catholicism
- National affiliation: Forza Nazzjonali (2017)
- European affiliation: European People's Party
- European Parliament group: European People's Party Group
- International affiliation: International Democracy Union; Centrist Democrat International
- Colours: Blue
- Anthem: "Sbejħa Patrija" ("Beautiful Fatherland")
- Parliament of Malta: 37 / 67
- European Parliament: 3 / 6
- Mayors of localities: 23 / 68
- Local council seats: 206 / 462

Party flag

Website
- pn.org.mt

The Nationalist Party (Maltese: Partit Nazzjonalista, PN) is one of the two major contemporary political parties in Malta, along with the Labour Party.

It is a Christian democratic and conservative political party. It is centre-right on the political spectrum. It is supportive of Malta's membership in the European Union. It is currently in opposition to the Labour Party. Since independence in 1964, the Nationalist Party has won six out of the thirteen general elections, in 1966, 1987, 1992, 1998, 2003 and 2008. In 2008, it won with a paper-thin majority of around 1500 votes.

== History ==
=== Foundation and early years (1880–1918) ===
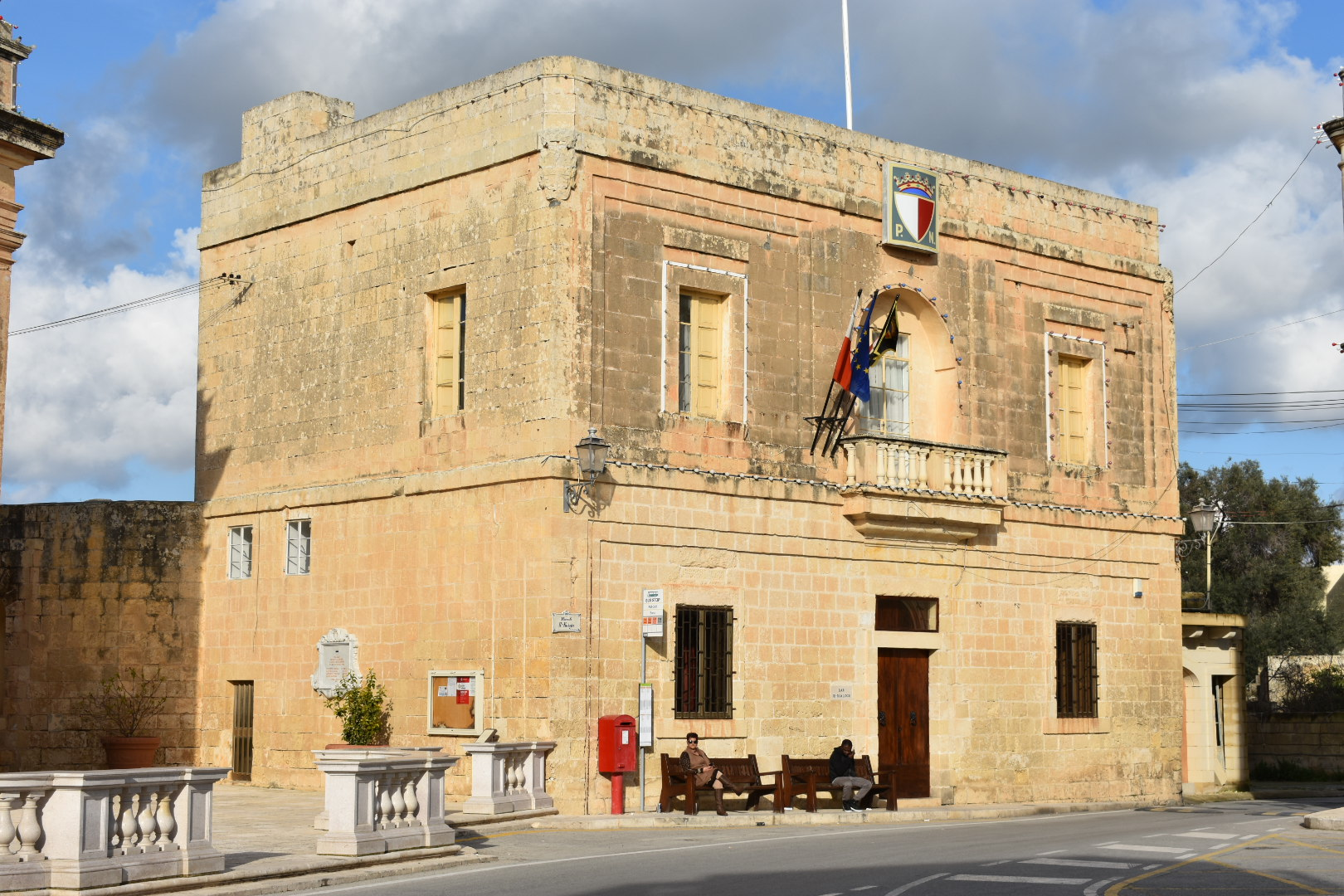
Dar id-Djalogu, now Nationalist Party club of Safi, Malta

The Nationalist Party's roots lie in the important language question of the late 19th century, when the colonial government in Malta tried to give the English language the importance Italian had held in schools, administration and courts of law. Fortunato Mizzi, who was a lawyer at the time, strongly opposed these reforms, and in 1880, he set up the "Partito Anti-Riformista" (Anti-Reform Party). He and his followers also wanted a better constitution for the island, as the one imposed at the time had been granted by governor Richard More O'Ferrall in 1849, and gave the Maltese little self-determination and autonomy. This was because the governor was to appoint more members to the council of government than there were to be elected by the voters.

Against the Anti-Reform Party stood the Reform Party, founded by Sigismondo Savona in 1879. The Reform Party was in favour of the language reforms being imposed.

In 1886, Fortunato Mizzi, together with Gerald Strickland (another anti-reformist at the time), went to London to demand a new constitution for the islands, which would give them representative government. This constitution was granted in 1887 (known as the Knutsford Constitution), and added more elected members to the council of government than official (appointed) members.

During the next few years, the party was divided between abstentionists and anti-abstentionists. The abstentionists would immediately resign their post in the Council of Government immediately upon election as a protest against the token representation of the electorate on the council; the anti-abstentionists favoured co-operation with the colonial authorities in order to work for a better constitution.

This practice of abstentionism led to the 1887 constitution being withdrawn, and in 1903, a new one was given instead, similar to that of 1887.

=== Interwar period (1918–39) ===
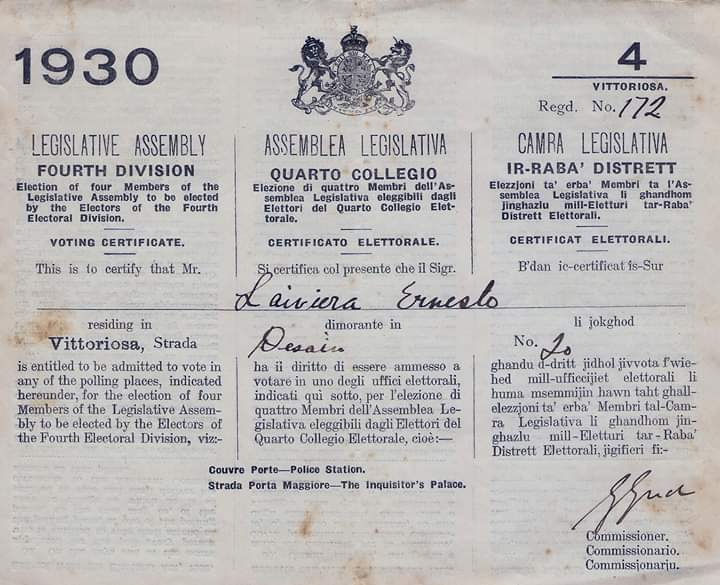
Tri-lingual voting document for the later-cancelled 1930 elections in Malta

Following the First World War a broader and more moderate coalition, the Maltese Political Union (UPM), was formed but a more radical and pro-Italian group, the Democratic Nationalist Party (PDN), split from the main party. The two groups contested the first legislative elections of 1921 but in separate constituencies so as not to damage each other's chances. However, after elections the UPM, which emerged as the largest Party in the Legislative Assembly, chose Labour as its coalition partner.

The parties again contested the 1924 elections separately although this time they did form a coalition, eventually merging on 16 January 1926 under the old name of Nationalist Party. It lost its first election as a re-unified Party in 1927 to the "Compact", an electoral alliance between the Constitutional Party and Labour.

A constitutional crisis, resulting from a dispute between the Church and the Constitutional Party, meant that elections were suspended in 1930. They were held again in 1932 when the Nationalists emerged victorious (21 seats out of 32). However, the Nationalists did not last long in government. The colonial authorities, concerned at the rise of fascist Italy in the Mediterranean and Africa, suspended the government and the constitution on the pretext that government's measures to strengthen instruction of Italian in schools violated the Constitution.

The party openly sided with General Franco's Nationalist army in the Spanish Civil War. This is still seen by the historical iconography that stayed on the party, including the proto-Fascist imagery of the party logo is a shield set against a black background (black being the heraldic colour chosen by Mussolini, as evidenced by his "Blackshirts"), the PN's official anthem, which is still sung during mass meetings, being similar to the official anthem of Mussolini's Fascist party, "La Giovinezza", and also the name of the party itself, which in itself includes the term nazionale for the first time, which was inspired by Italian nationalism.

=== World War II and the postwar period (1939–64) ===
The Nationalists received what could have been their coup de grâce during World War II. Their association with Italy, the wartime enemy, antagonised them with the electorate, and their leader Enrico Mizzi (son of Fortunato) was first interned and then exiled to Uganda during the war along with other supporters of the party. The party did not even contest the 1945 elections for the Maltese council of government, which, for the first time, raised the Labour Party from third-party status to that of a major party at the expense of the Constitutionals.

Notwithstanding, the Nationalist Party survived and in its first major electoral test, the legislative elections of 1947, it managed to stay ahead of various splinters that had formed from people who did not want to be associated with the main party. In the following 1950 elections, a very damaging split occurred in the ranks of the governing Labour Party resulting in two parties: the Malta Labour Party (MLP) and the Malta Workers' Party (MWP). This helped the Nationalists become the largest party in the Legislative Assembly and form a minority government which, though short-lived, re-established the Nationalist Party as a major political party. Enrico Mizzi was sworn in as Prime Minister, but died after three months in December.

Two subsequent elections were held in 1951 and 1953 where the Nationalists formed short-lived coalitions with the Malta Workers Party (which, over the years, eventually disintegrated). The Party lost the 1955 elections to Labour and the following years it led the campaign against the Labour Government's proposal for integration with Britain. Integration failed largely because Britain lost interest after the Suez fiasco and the constitution was again revoked in 1958 following massive disturbances over redundancies at the Malta Drydocks.

=== Post-independence (1964–2013) ===
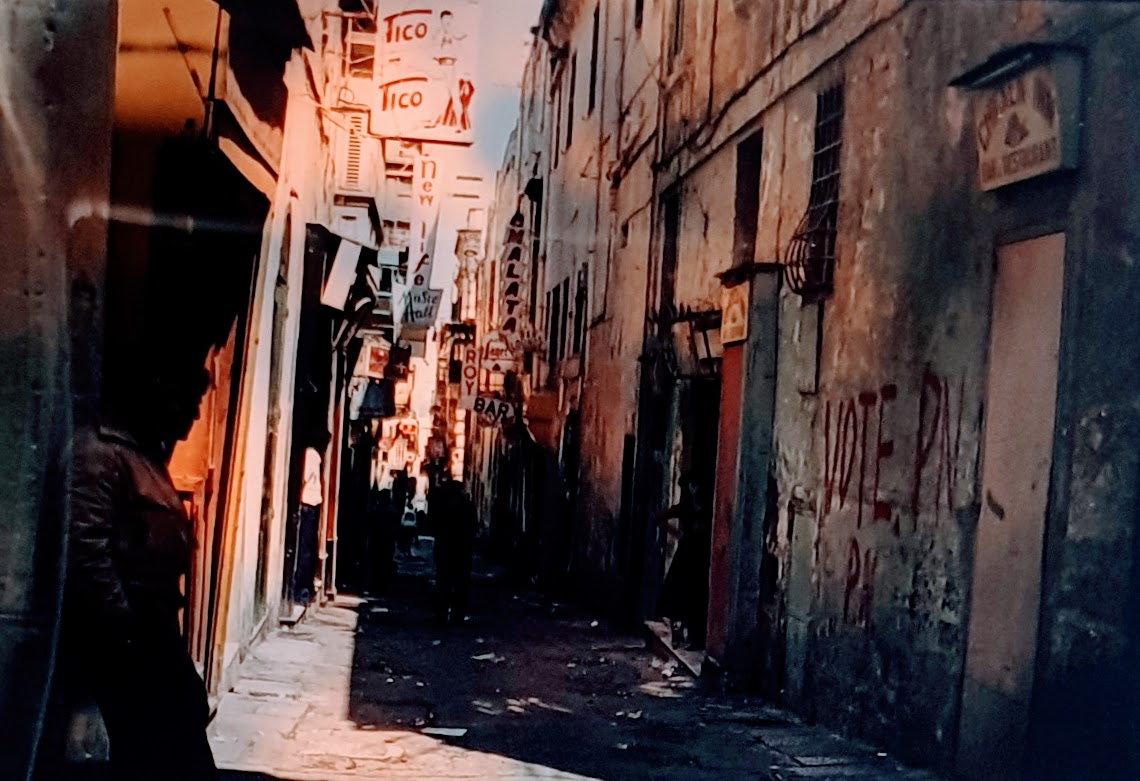
"Vote PN" graffiti in Strait street, Valletta, 1980

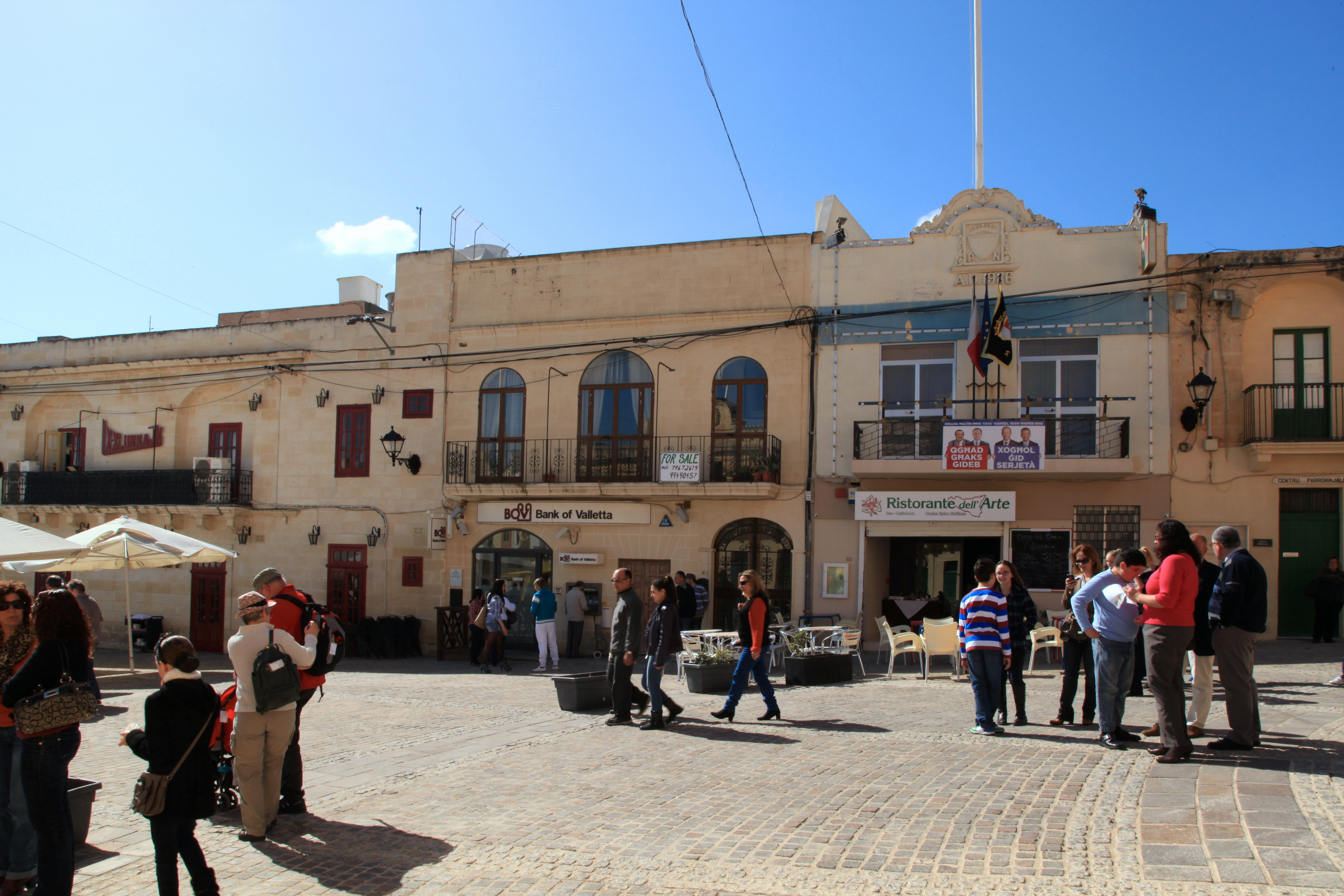
Nationalist Party club in the square of Marsaxlokk

A new constitution was enacted in 1961. The Nationalists, led by George Borg Olivier, won the 1962 elections, fighting largely over the issue of independence. Their win was accelerated by a second politico-religious crisis between the Church and the Labour Party. Independence was achieved in 1964, and the Party returned to office in the elections of 1966. It lost the 1971 elections by a narrow margin and lost again in the election in 1976.

In the elections of 1981 the party, led by Eddie Fenech Adami achieved an absolute majority of votes for the first time since 1933 but it did not gain a parliamentary majority and so remained in the opposition. A crisis followed with the party MPs refusing to take their seats. Amendments to the constitution in 1987 meant that the party was voted into office that same year after 16 years in opposition.

In 1990, the government formally applied to join the European Community. A wide-ranging programme of liberalisation and public investments meant the return to office with a larger majority in 1992. However, the party was defeated in the 1996 elections. The stint in opposition would last only twenty-two months as the government soon lost its one-seat majority. The party won the 1998 elections convincingly, a feat that was repeated in 2003, following the conclusions of accession negotiations with the European Union in 2002.

The Nationalist Party proposed Malta's accession to the European Union, a question which was put forward in the 2003 Maltese European Union membership referendum. Those in favour were 53% of eligible voters, a result that prompted the 2003 snap election in order to confirm the mandate. Malta joined the European Union in 2004.

The Nationalist Party narrowly won the general election of 2008. It lost the 2013 election, and has since been in opposition.

=== Opposition period (since 2013) ===
After the most recent Nationalist government, led by Lawrence Gonzi, the party lost its majority in parliament in the final year of the legislature, the same government fell when the budget vote (also a vote of confidence) was defeated, thus meaning it was the first Nationalist-led government since independence to fall from power.

After approximately 23 years in government (With Labour's short 2-year stint between 1996 and 1998 being in between two stints of PN governance) the Nationalist Party took a major defeat in the Maltese general elections of 2013, losing several districts and resulting in a nine-seat deficit in parliament between it and the opposition. The win in the elections is considered to have been the biggest victory any party has had since Malta's independence, with the opposing Labour Party taking 55% of the votes with a difference of 35,000 votes between the two parties.

The Nationalist Party again suffered a loss in the European Parliament election of 2014 against the governing Labour Party by over 34,000 votes, but managed to elect its third MEP for the first time since Malta's entrance in the EU, namely Roberta Metsola, David Casa and Therese Comodini Cachia.

In the 2015 local council elections, the Nationalist Party increased its vote percentage from 41% in 2012, to 45%.

In the lead-up to the 2017 general election, the Nationalist Party negotiated for a coalition with the newly formed centre-left Democratic Party (PD) and the green Democratic Alternative (AD) in Malta, all under the campaign Forza Nazzjonali. Under an agreement reached with PD leader and former Labour and Nationalist MP Marlene Farrugia, PD candidates contested the 2017 general election under the Nationalist banner with the added notation "tal-orange". (referring to the PD's party colour). Any elected PD members would participate in a future Nationalist-led government. Negotiations with the AD were unsuccessful due to the AD wanting all three parties to run candidates under a new name, Qawsalla ("Rainbow"), with unified policy platforms rather than simply as Nationalists with an added notation.

The party formed a coalition list called Forza Nazzjonali together with the Democratic Party. Nevertheless, this was not successful, and the party, under Forza Nazzjonali, was once more defeated in the 2017 snap election.

After the election, Simon Busuttil resigned from the position of leader of the party alongside the deputy leaders of his administration. A new election for the leadership role was decided in which for the first time, paid PN supporters can vote as well as the executive. The four candidates in the first round were Adrian Delia, Chris Said, Alex Perici Calascione and Frank Portelli. Alex Perici Calascione and Frank Portelli were the two candidates who did not pass through the first phase. In the second round Adrian Delia emerged as the winner of the leadership election, in which he gained 7,734 votes (52.7% of the vote), to Said's 6,932 votes.

During the 2019 European Parliament election, the party took an even bigger defeat than before, with a 43,000-vote difference between the two parties. This would lead to the party losing another seat, while the Labour party gaining one seat.

Former Speaker of the House of Representatives of Malta, Louis Galea, has suggested that the party rebrand, possibly under the new name People's National Party (Maltese: Partit Nazzjonali tal-Poplu), in order to avoid association with other contemporary "nationalist" parties in Europe, which tend to be positioned on the far-right.

Roberta Metsola, a member of PN, was elected President of the European Parliament in January 2022 following the unexpected death of David Sassoli.

The Party would soon suffer its own internal crisis when Adrian Delia was voted out from his role as the leader of the party after the newsportal LovinMalta alleged that well-informed sources told them that WhatsApp messages were sent between him and the alleged mastermind of Daphne Caruana Galizia's murder, Yorgen Fenech. This fact would soon be picked up by other MPs from the same party who would use it as a casus belli to vote Delia out of power. This would culminate with Bernard Grech emerging as a challenger to Adrian Delia, who would in turn be elected as the new leader of the PN. However, it would soon emerge that the WhatsApp leaks were greatly exaggerated by another MP, Jason Azzopardi, who after Delia challenged him to publish the hundreds of messages that he claimed to have exchanged with Fenech, would backtrack on his claim of Delia "being in Fenech's pockets," and signed a joint declaration in which they both reconciled. Additionally, LovinMalta was taken to court on accusations of libel by Adrian Delia over its article, in which LovinMalta published another article claiming that they did not verify the allegation made by the third party about Delia, but verified that the allegation had been made. They also expressed regret in that the article may have been misunderstood as an allegation of wrongdoing on the part of Delia. As a result, Delia withdrew the libel case against them.

In the 2022 general election, the party was again rocked by the fact that four major PN politicians would not run; in addition, one of these politicians, Mario Galea, spoke out, saying that other politicians close to the PN leadership "made my life hell" and that "I was made a disposable commodity. People close to the leadership also called out my mental health." Because of these revelations regarding its internal party politics, the PN suffered its third consecutive defeat in the 2022 general election. Additionally, the 2022 general election was marked by the biggest difference of voter share of between the two parties since the 1951 general election.

On 10 June 2025, Bernard Grech announced his resignation as Leader of the Nationalist Party and Leader of the Opposition, effective as soon as his successor is elected, following an internal leadership contest. His resignation came two days after the news portal Malta Today released the results of a survey placing voting intentions for the Partit Nazzjonalista at 39.7% compared to the Partit Laburista's 53.3%, with Grech's trust rating at a staggering 18.8% to Prime Minister Robert Abela's 50%. Following the resignation, the party held an election on 6 September 2025, in which Alex Borg defeated Adrian Delia by a forty-four vote margin to become party leader.

== Ideology ==
Malta's Nationalist Party emerged from the Anti-Reform Party founded by Fortunato Mizzi in 1883, opposing taxation policies decreed by the British authorities and measures to anglicise the educational and judiciary during the "Language Question" period.

The party supported human rights, so long as they were in line with Catholicism. In 2011 it was noted that its party platform was "far to the right of most other Christian Democratic parties, the Bavarian Christian Social Union in Germany included". In the following years, the party moved towards more centrist positions and became more progressive. The Nationalist Party opposed the introduction of divorce in Malta in 2011. However, since then, it has changed to a position of support for it and for other liberal ideas.

The Nationalist Party was the first party to have an openly gay MP, Karl Gouder, and Trans Candidate Alex Mangion. The majority of its parliamentary group voted in favour of gay marriage in 2017. The party calls itself a mosaic of people and ideologies. The party recruited a non-binary member, Mark Josef Rapa, for their pro-LGBT group, FOIPN.

A clause in the party statute dating back to 1991 bans active or former Freemasons from taking active roles, including casting a democratic vote, within the parameters controlled by the party itself.

== Organization ==
=== Leaders ===
- Fortunato Mizzi (1880–1905)
- Enrico "Nerik" Mizzi (1905–1926)
- Sir Ugo Pasquale Mifsud and Enrico Mizzi (1926–1942)
- Enrico Mizzi (1940–1950)
- Giorgio "Ġorġ" Borg Olivier (1950–1977)
- Edoardo "Eddie" Fenech Adami (1977–2004)
- Lawrence Gonzi (2004–2013)
- Simon Busuttil (2013–2017)
- Adrian Delia (2017–2020)
- Bernard Grech (2020–2025)
- Alex Borg (2025–present)

==== Prime Ministers ====
- Sir Ugo Pasquale Mifsud (1924–1927, 1932–1933)
- Enrico Mizzi (1950)
- Giorgio "Ġorġ" Borg Olivier (1950–1955, 1962–1971)
- Eddie Fenech Adami (1987–1996, 1998–2004)
- Lawrence Gonzi (2004–2013)

=== Structure ===
The party structures are the General, Executive and Administrative Councils, the Parliamentary Group, the District Fora and Sectional Committees, the College of Local Councillors and a number of party branches.

Party officials include the Leader, two Deputy Leaders, Secretary-General, President of the Party's General Councils and Presidents for each of the Executive and Administrative Committees, Treasurer, International Secretary and Parliamentary Group Whip.

The General Council is made up of delegates and representatives from other party structures, the largest number being delegates elected by the Sectional Committees. The General Council elects and approves the Party Leader and two Deputy Leaders, approves the electoral programme, approves the Secretary-General's report on the state of the party and amends the Party Statute. The executive committee is made up of the party's most senior officials, representatives of the General Council, the Parliamentary Group, Sectional Committees and the Party branches. The executive committee is the political and policy making body of the Party and, amongst other things, elects most of the party officials, approves candidates, drafts the electoral programme and lays out the broad policy guidelines. The Administrative Committee is made up of party officials, Presidents of all of the party's branches and deals with organisational and administrative issues.

The party is organised geographically in Sectional Committees which are then organised in District Fora with special provisions applying for Party organisation in Gozo. The Parliamentary Group and the College of Local Councillors bring together the party's elected representatives in parliament and local councils. The party's branches include an equal opportunities section, as well as youth, women's, seniors, workers, professionals, entrepreneurs, local councillors, candidates and former MPs sections.

=== Media holdings ===
Although not directly part of the party's structure, the PN owns the television station NET Television, the online news portal netnews.com.mt, Net FM radio station, and the In-Nazzjon and Il-Mument newspapers through its holding company Media.link Communications.

=== Party splits ===
The party had two splits:

- Democratic Nationalist Party led by Lawyer Herbert Ganado, disestablished in 1966.
- Azzjoni Nazzjonali led by Joseph "Josie" Muscat, disestablished in 2010.

== Election results ==
=== House of Representatives ===
Election	Leader	Votes	%	Seats	+/−	Rank	Status
1927	Ugo Pasquale Mifsud	14,321	41.5	13 / 32	New	2nd	Opposition
1932	Ugo Pasquale Mifsud	28,777	59.6	21 / 32	▲8	1st	Majority
1939	Ugo Pasquale Mifsud	11,618	33.1	3 / 10	▼18	2nd	Opposition
1945	Enrico Mizzi	did not contest					
1947	Enrico Mizzi	19,041	18.0	7 / 40	▲7	2nd	Opposition
1950	Enrico Mizzi	31,431	29.6	12 / 40	▲5	1st	Minority
1951	George Borg Olivier	39,946	35.5	15 / 40	▲3	1st	Coalition
1953	George Borg Olivier	45,180	38.1	18 / 40	▲3	2nd	Coalition
1955	George Borg Olivier	48,514	40.2	17 / 40	▼1	2nd	Opposition
1962	George Borg Olivier	48,514	40.2	25 / 50	▲8	1st	Minority
1966	George Borg Olivier	68,656	47.9	28 / 50	▲3	1st	Majority
1971	George Borg Olivier	80,753	48.1	27 / 55	▼1	2nd	Opposition
1976	George Borg Olivier	99,551	48.5	31 / 65	▲4	2nd	Opposition
1981	Eddie Fenech Adami	114,132	50.9	31 / 65	0	2nd	Opposition
1987	Eddie Fenech Adami	119,721	50.9	35 / 69	▲4	1st	Majority
1992	Eddie Fenech Adami	127,932	51.8	34 / 65	▼1	1st	Majority
1996	Eddie Fenech Adami	124,864	47.8	34 / 69	0	2nd	Opposition
1998	Eddie Fenech Adami	137,037	51.8	35 / 65	▲1	1st	Majority
2003	Eddie Fenech Adami	146,172	51.8	35 / 65	0	1st	Majority
2008	Lawrence Gonzi	143,468	49.3	35 / 69	0	1st	Majority
2013	Lawrence Gonzi	132,426	43.3	30 / 69	▼5	2nd	Opposition
2017	Simon Busuttil	130,850	42.1	28 / 67	▼2	2nd	Opposition
2022	Bernard Grech	123,233	41.7	35 / 79	▲7	2nd	Opposition
2026	Alex Borg	136,723	44.68	37 / 79	▲2	2nd	Opposition

=== European Parliament ===
Election	Leader	Votes	%	Seats	+/−	Rank	EP Group
2004	Lawrence Gonzi	97,688	39.8	2 / 5	New	2nd	EPP-ED
2009	Lawrence Gonzi	100,483	40.5	2 / 6	0	2nd	EPP
2014	Simon Busuttil	100,785	40.2	3 / 6	▲1	2nd	EPP
2019	Adrian Delia	98,611	37.9	2 / 6	▼1	2nd	EPP
2024	Bernard Grech	109,351	42.0	3 / 6	▲1	2nd	EPP

== See also ==
- Media.link Communications, the communications holding company of the party
