= List of members of the parliament of Malta, 2008–2013 =

This is a list of members of Parliament (MPs) elected to the House of Representatives of Malta for the 11th Legislature since Independence at the 2008 general election.

The list is arranged by office. New MPs elected since the general election and changes in party allegiance are noted.

== Graphical representation of the House of Representatives ==
This is a comparison of the party strengths in the Maltese House of Representatives:

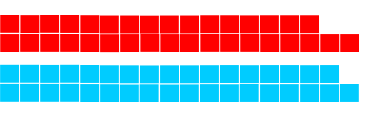

== List of MPs elected in the general election including changes during legislature ==
Office(s)	Officeholder
Speaker (10 May 2008 – 29 April 2010)	Mr.Speaker Louis Galea MP
Speaker (29 April 2010 Onwards)	Mr.Speaker Michael Frendo MP
Deputy Speaker (10 May 2008 – 8 May 2010)	The Hon Carmelo Abela MP
Deputy Speaker (8 May 2010 Onwards)	The Hon Censu Galea MP
Government – Partit Nazzjonalista
Prime Minister	The Hon Lawrence Gonzi MP
Deputy Prime Minister (11 March 2008 – 28 September 2012)	The Hon Tonio Borg MP
Minister of Foreign Affairs (11 March 2008 – 28 September 2012)	The Hon Tonio Borg MP
Leader of the House of Representatives (10 May 2008 – 6 January 2012), (30 May 2012 – 28 September 2012)	The Hon Tonio Borg MP
Minister of Finance, The Economy and Investment	The Hon Tonio Fenech MP
Minister of Gozo	The Hon Giovanna Debono MP
Minister of Infrastructure, Transport and Communications (15 April 2008 Onwards)	The Hon Austin Gatt MP
Minister for Communications and National Projects (11 March 2008 – 15 April 2008)	The Hon Austin Gatt MP
Minister of Resources and Rural Affairs	The Hon George Pullicino MP
Minister of Education and Employment (6 January 2012 Onwards)	The Hon Dolores Cristina MP
Minister of Education, Employment and Family (9 February 2010 – 6 January 2012)	The Hon Dolores Cristina MP
Minister of Education (11 March 2008 – 9 February 2010)	The Hon Dolores Cristina MP
Member of Parliament (30 May 2012 Onwards)	The Hon Carmelo Mifsud Bonnici MP
Minister of Home Affairs and Local Government (6 January 2012 – 30 May 2012)	The Hon Carmelo Mifsud Bonnici MP
Leader of the House of Representatives (6 January 2012 – 30 May 2012)	The Hon Carmelo Mifsud Bonnici MP
Minister of Justice and Home Affairs (10 March 2008 – 6 January 2012)	The Hon Carmelo Mifsud Bonnici MP
Minister of Health, The Elderly and Community Care (9 February 2010 Onwards)	The Hon Joe Cassar MP
Parliamentary Secretary for Health (11 March 2008 – 9 February 2010)	The Hon Joe Cassar MP
Minister of Social Policy (11 March 2008 – 9 February 2010)	The Hon John Dalli MP
Minister of Tourism, the Environment and Culture (6 January 2012 Onwards)	The Hon Mario de Marco MP
Parliamentary Secretary for Tourism, the Environment and Culture (9 February 2010 – 6 January 2012)	The Hon Mario de Marco MP
Parliamentary Secretary for Tourism (11 March 2008 – 9 February 2010)	The Hon Mario de Marco MP
Minister of Justice, Public Dialogue and Family (6 January 2012 Onwards)	The Hon Chris Said MP
Parliamentary Secretary for Consumers, Fair Competition, Local Councils and Public Dialogue (5 November 2010 – 6 January 2012)	The Hon Chris Said MP
Member of Parliament (23 September 2010 – 5 November 2010)	The Hon Chris Said MP
Parliamentary Secretary for Consumers, Fair Competition, Local Councils and Public Dialogue (9 February 2010 – 23 September 2010)	The Hon Chris Said MP
Parliamentary Secretary for Local Councils and Public Dialogue (11 March 2008 – 9 February 2010)	The Hon Chris Said MP
Minister of Small Business, Land, Consumer and Competition (6 January 2012 Onwards)	The Hon Jason Azzopardi MP
Parliamentary Secretary for Small Business and Land (9 February 2010 – 6 January 2012)	The Hon Jason Azzopardi MP
Parliamentary Secretary for Land (11 March 2008 – 9 February 2010)	The Hon Jason Azzopardi MP
Minister of Foreign Affairs (28 September 2012 Onwards)	The Hon Francis Zammit Dimech MP
Member of Parliament (10 May 2008 – 28 September 2012)	The Hon Francis Zammit Dimech MP
Parliamentary Secretary for the Elderly and Community Care	The Hon Mario Galea MP
Parliamentary Secretary for Youth and Sport	The Hon Clyde Puli MP
Government Backbenchers
Parliamentary Assistant in the Ministry of Foreign Affairs (10 March 2010 Onwards)	The Hon David Agius MP
Parliamentary Assistants Group Coordinator (10 March 2010 Onwards)	The Hon David Agius MP
Party Whip for the Government	The Hon David Agius MP
Parliamentary Assistant in the Office of the Prime Minister (10 March 2010 Onwards)	The Hon Franco Debono MP
Parliamentary Assistant in the Ministry of Gozo (10 March 2010 Onwards)	The Hon Frederick Azzopardi MP
Deputy Party Whip for the Government	The Hon Frederick Azzopardi MP
Parliamentary Assistant in the Ministry of Infrastructure, Transport and Communications (10 March 2010 Onwards)	The Hon Charlò Bonnici MP
Parliamentary Assistant in the Ministry of Resources and Rural Affairs (10 March 2010 Onwards)	The Hon Philip Mifsud MP
Parliamentary Assistant in the Ministry of Education, Employment and Family (10 March 2010 Onwards)	The Hon Stephen Spiteri MP
Parliamentary Assistant in the Ministry of Finance, The Economy and Investment (10 March 2010 Onwards)	The Hon Robert Arrigo MP
Parliamentary Assistant in the Ministry of Home Affairs and Local Government (6 January 2012 Onwards)	The Hon Beppe Fenech Adami MP
Parliamentary Assistant in the Ministry of Justice and Home Affairs (10 March 2010 – 6 January 2012)	The Hon Beppe Fenech Adami MP
Parliamentary Assistant in the Ministry of Health, The Elderly and Community Care (10 March 2010 Onwards)	The Hon Peter Micallef MP
Member of Parliament (10 May 2008 – 29 April 2010)	The Hon Michael Frendo MP
Member of Parliament	The Hon Frans Agius MP
Member of Parliament	The Hon Edwin Vassallo MP
Member of Parliament	The Hon Jean-Pierre Farrugia MP
Member of Parliament	The Hon Censu Galea MP
Member of Parliament	The Hon Louis Deguara MP
Member of Parliament	The Hon Jesmond Mugliett MP
Deputy Party Whip for the Government	The Hon Joseph Falzon MP
Member of Parliament	The Hon Jeffrey Pullicino Orlando MP
Member of Parliament	The Hon Ninu Zammit MP
Member of Parliament	The Hon Michael Gonzi MP
Member of Parliament (29 April 2010 Onwards)	The Hon Karl Gouder MP
Member of Parliament (5 December 2012 Onwards)	The Hon Michael Asciak MP
Opposition – Partit Laburista
Leader of the Opposition (1 October 2008 Onwards)	The Hon Joseph Muscat MP
Leader of the Opposition (5 June 2008 – 1 October 2008)	The Hon Charles Mangion MP
Member of Parliament (1 October 2008 Onwards)	The Hon Charles Mangion MP
Member of Parliament (5 June 2008 Onwards)	The Hon Alfred Sant MP
Leader of the Opposition (10 March 2008 – 5 June 2008)	The Hon Alfred Sant MP
Party Whip for the Opposition	The Hon Joe Mizzi MP
Deputy Leader of the Opposition (13 June 2008 Onwards)	The Hon Angelo Farrugia MP
Member of Parliament (10 May 2008 – 13 June 2008)	The Hon Angelo Farrugia MP
Member of Parliament (10 March 2008 – 1 October 2008)	The Hon Joseph Cuschieri MP
Member of Parliament	The Hon Owen Bonnici MP
Member of Parliament (10 May 2008 – 12 October 2008)	The Hon Karl Chircop MP
Member of Parliament (31 October 2008 Onwards)	The Hon Gino Cauchi MP
Member of Parliament	The Hon Marlene Farrugia MP
Member of Parliament	The Hon Helena Dalli MP
Member of Parliament	The Hon Justyne Caruana MP
Member of Parliament	The Hon Michael Falzon MP
Member of Parliament	The Hon Gavin Gulia MP
Member of Parliament	The Hon Joe Debono Grech MP
Member of Parliament	The Hon Joseph Mario Sammut MP
Member of Parliament	The Hon George Vella MP
Member of Parliament	The Hon Christopher Agius MP
Member of Parliament	The Hon Luciano Busuttil MP
Member of Parliament	The Hon Anton Refalo MP
Member of Parliament	The Hon Charles Buhagiar MP
Member of Parliament	The Hon Silvio Parnis MP
Member of Parliament	The Hon Marie Louise Coleiro Preca MP
Member of Parliament	The Hon Stefan Buontempo MP
Member of Parliament	The Hon Noel Farrugia MP
Member of Parliament	The Hon Adrian Vassallo MP
Member of Parliament	The Hon Chris Cardona MP
Member of Parliament	The Hon Anthony Zammit MP
Member of Parliament	The Hon Leo Brincat MP
Member of Parliament	The Hon Jose Herrera MP
Member of Parliament	The Hon Roderick Galdes MP
Member of Parliament	The Hon Karmenu Vella MP
Member of Parliament	The Hon Anthony Agius Decelis MP
Member of Parliament	The Hon Michael Farrugia MP
Member of Parliament	The Hon Evarist Bartolo MP
Member of Parliament	The Hon Carmelo Abela MP

== See also ==
- Elections in Malta
- Politics of Malta
