= List of members of the parliament of Malta, 2013–2017 =

This is a list of members of Parliament (MPs) elected to the House of Representatives of Malta for the 12th Legislature since Independence at the 2013 general election.

The list is arranged by office. New MPs elected since the general election and changes in party allegiance are noted. The inauguration of the 12th Legislature took place on Saturday, 6 April 2013.

== Graphical representation of the House of Representatives ==
This is a comparison of the party strengths in the Maltese House of Representatives:

== List of MPs 2013–2017 ==
Office(s)	Officeholder
Speaker	The Hon Anglu Farrugia MP
Deputy Speaker	The Hon Censu Galea MP
Government - Labour Party
Prime Minister	The Hon Joseph Muscat MP
Parliamentary Secretary for Planning and Administrative Simplification	The Hon Michael Farrugia MP 13 March 2013 – 2 April 2014
Parliamentary Secretary for Planning and Administrative Simplification	The Hon Michael Falzon MP 2 April 2014 – 20 January 2016
Parliamentary Secretary for Planning and Administrative Simplification	The Hon Deborah Schembri MP 21 January 2016 – 3 June 20117
Deputy Prime Minister	The Hon Louis Grech MP
Minister of European Affairs	The Hon Louis Grech MP
Leader of the House of Representatives	The Hon Louis Grech MP
Parliamentary Secretary for EU Funds and 2017 Presidency	The Hon Ian Borg MP
Minister of Foreign Affairs	The Hon George William Vella MP
Minister of Tourism	The Hon Karmenu Vella MP 13 March 2013 – 2 April 2014
Minister of Tourism	The Hon Edward Zammit Lewis MP 2 April 2014
Parliamentary Secretary for Local Government and Culture	The Hon José Herrera MP 13 March 2013 – 2 April 2014
Minister of Education and Employment	The Hon Evarist Bartolo MP
Parliamentary Secretary for Research, Innovation, Youth and Sport	The Hon Stefan Buontempo MP 13 March 2013 – 2 April 2014
Parliamentary Secretary for Research, Innovation, Youth and Sport	The Hon Christopher Agius MP 2 April 2014
Minister of Transport and the Infrastructure	The Hon Joseph Mizzi MP
Minister for the Environment, Sustainable Development and Climate Change	The Hon Leo Brincat MP until 2016
Minister for the Environment, Sustainable Development and Climate Change	The Hon Jose Herrera MP 2 April 2016
Parliamentary Secretary for Agriculture, Fisheries and Animal Rights	The Hon Roderick Galdes MP
Minister for Gozo	The Hon Anton Refalo MP
Minister for Social Dialogue, Consumer Affairs and Civil liberties	The Hon Helena Dalli MP
Minister for the Economy, Investment and Small Business	The Hon Christian Cardona MP
Parliamentary Secretary for Competitiveness and Economic Growth	The Hon Edward Zammit Lewis MP 13 March 2013 – 2 April 2014
Parliamentary Secretary for Competitiveness and Economic Growth	The Hon José Herrera MP 2 April 2014
Minister of the Family and Social Solidarity	The Hon Marie Louise Coleiro Preca MP 13 March 2013 – 2 April 2014
Minister of the Family and Social Solidarity	The Hon Michael Farrugia MP 2 April 2014
Parliamentary Secretary for Active Ageing and Disability Rights	The Hon Franco Mercieca MP 13 March 2013 – 2 April 2014
Parliamentary Secretary for Active Ageing and Disability Rights	The Hon Justyne Caruana MP 2 April 2014
Minister of Home Affairs and National Security	The Hon Emanuel Mallia MP
Minister of Home Affairs and National Security	The Hon Carmelo Abela MP
Parliamentary Secretary for Justice	The Hon Owen Bonnici MP 13 March 2013 – 2 April 2014
Minister for Justice, Culture and Local Government	The Hon Owen Bonnici MP 13 March 2013 – 2 April 2014
Parliamentary Secretary for Local Government and Culture	The Hon Stefan Buontempo MP 2 April 2014
Minister of Finance	The Hon Edward Scicluna MP
Minister for Energy and Water Conservation	The Hon Konrad Mizzi MP
Minister for Health	The Hon Godfrey Farrugia MP 13 March 2013 - 2 April 2014
Minister for Energy and Health	The Hon Konrad Mizzi MP 2 April 2014
Minister without portfolio	The Hon Konrad Mizzi MP April 2016
Parliamentary Secretary for Health	The Hon Chris Fearne MP 2 April 2014
Minister for Health	The Hon Chris Fearne MP April 2016
Minister for Competitiveness, Digital, maritime and Services Economy	The Hon Manuel Mallia MP 2 April 2016
Government Backbenchers
Party Whip for the Government	The Hon Carmelo Abela MP
Party Whip for the Government	The Hon Godfrey Farrugia MP
Member of Parliament	The Hon Anthony Agius Decelis MP
Member of Parliament	The Hon Christopher Agius MP
Member of Parliament	The Hon Charles Buhagiar MP
Member of Parliament	The Hon Luciano Busuttil MP
Member of Parliament	The Hon Deo Debattista MP
Member of Parliament	The Hon Joe Debono Grech MP
Member of Parliament	The Hon Michael Falzon MP
Member of Parliament	The Hon Charles Mangion MP
Member of Parliament	The Hon Etienne Grech MP
Member of Parliament	The Hon Silvio Parnis MP
Member of Parliament	The Hon Silvio Schembri MP
Member of Parliament	The Hon Joseph Mario Sammut MP
Member of Parliament	The Hon Joe Farrugia MP
Member of Parliament	The Hon Clifton Grima MP
Opposition - Nationalist Party
Leader of the Opposition (20 March 2013 – 13 May 2013)	The Hon Lawrence Gonzi MP
Leader of the Opposition (10 May 2013 Onwards)	The Hon Simon Busuttil MP
Deputy Leader (Parliamentary affairs)	The Hon Mario Demarco MP
Party Whip for the Opposition	The Hon David Agius MP
Member of Parliament	The Hon Robert Arrigo MP
Member of Parliament	The Hon Frederick Azzopardi MP
Member of Parliament	The Hon Jason Azzopardi MP
Member of Parliament	The Hon Anthony Bezzina MP
Member of Parliament	The Hon Charlo Bonnici MP
Member of Parliament	The Hon Claudette Buttigieg MP
Member of Parliament	The Hon Ryan Callus MP
Member of Parliament	The Hon Anthony Abela MP
Member of Parliament	The Hon Robert Cutajar MP
Member of Parliament	The Hon Kristy Debono MP
Member of Parliament	The Hon Mario de Marco MP
Member of Parliament	The Hon Antoine Borg MP
Member of Parliament	The Hon Albert Fenech MP until 2016
Deputy Leader (party affairs)	The Hon Beppe Fenech Adami MP
Member of Parliament	The Hon Tonio Fenech MP
Member of Parliament	The Hon Mario Galea MP
Member of Parliament	The Hon Censu Galea MP
Member of Parliament	The Hon Claudio Grech MP
Member of Parliament	The Hon Michael Gonzi MP
Member of Parliament	The Hon Karl Gouder MP 2016
Member of Parliament	The Hon Peter Micallef MP 2016
Member of Parliament	The Hon Carmelo Mifsud Bonnici MP
Member of Parliament	The Hon Paula Mifsud Bonnici MP
Member of Parliament	The Hon Marthese Portelli MP
Member of Parliament	The Hon Clyde Puli MP
Member of Parliament	The Hon George Pullicino MP
Member of Parliament	The Hon Chris Said MP
Member of Parliament	The Hon Stephen Spiteri MP
Member of Parliament	The Hon Edwin Vassallo MP 2016
Member of Parliament	The Hon Francis Zammit Dimech MP
Member of Parliament	The Hon Joe Cassar MP until 1 November 2015
Opposition - Democratic Party
Member of Parliament	The Hon Marlene Farrugia MP
Opposition - Independent
Member of Parliament	The Hon Giovanna Debono MP

== See also ==
- Elections in Malta
- Politics of Malta
