= Maltese Government 2017–2022 =

2017–2020 elected Maltese government

Maltese Government 2017–22
- 22nd Cabinet of Malta
- Incumbent
- Date formed: 9 June 2017
- Date dissolved: 20 February 2022

People and organisations
- Head of state: Marie Louise Coleiro Preca (2017–2019); George Vella (2019–present)
- Head of government: Joseph Muscat (2017–2020); Robert Abela (2020–present)
- No. of ministers: 17
- Member party: Labour Party
- Opposition party: Nationalist Party; Democratic Party (2017–19); Independent (2019–2022)
- Opposition leader: Simon Busuttil (2017); Adrian Delia (2017–2020); Bernard Grech (2020–present)

History
- Election: 2017 general election
- Predecessor: Maltese Government 2013–17
- Successor: Maltese Government 2022–27

The Maltese Government 2017–2022 was the Government of Malta from 9 June 2017 till 20 February 2022. The Maltese government is elected through a General Election for a five-year term. The Head of Government during the earlier period of the legislature was Joseph Muscat. On 13 January 2020, Muscat stepped down as Prime Minister and, following an earlier internal election within the party’s structures, Robert Abela was nominated and sworn in as the Head of Government for the later period of the legislature. The Labour Party won a majority following a snap election which was held on 3 June 2017. Parliament was dissolved on 20 February 2022 and the date of the election was set to 26 March 2022.

== Muscat Ministry 2017-2020 ==
Portfolio	Minister	Political party	Assumed office	Left office
Prime Minister	Joseph Muscat	Labour	5 June 2017	13 January 2020
Deputy Prime Minister	Chris Fearne	Labour	13 July 2017	13 January 2020
Minister for the Economy, Investment, and Small Business	Christian Cardona	Labour	9 June 2017	13 January 2020
Minister for Education and Employment	Evarist Bartolo	Labour	9 June 2017	13 January 2020
Minister for Health	Chris Fearne	Labour	9 June 2017	13 January 2020
Minister for Environment, Sustainable Development, and Climate Change	José Herrera	Labour	9 June 2017	13 January 2020
Minister for Family and Children's Rights	Michael Falzon	Labour	9 June 2017	13 January 2020
Minister for Finance	Edward Scicluna	Labour	9 June 2017	13 January 2020
Minister for Foreign Affairs & Trade Promotion	Carmelo Abela	Labour	9 June 2017	13 January 2020
Minister for Gozo	Justyne Caruana	Labour	9 June 2017	13 January 2020
Minister for Home Affairs and National Security	Michael Farrugia	Labour	9 June 2017	13 January 2020
Minister for Justice, Culture, and Local Government	Owen Bonnici	Labour	9 June 2017	13 January 2020
Minister for European Affairs and Equality	Helena Dalli	Labour	9 June 2017	25 July 2019
Minister for European Affairs and Equality	Edward Zammit Lewis	Labour	25 July 2019	13 January 2020
Minister for Tourism	Konrad Mizzi	Labour	9 June 2017	26 November 2019
Minister for Energy and Water Management	Joe Mizzi	Labour	9 June 2017	13 January 2020
Minister for Transport, Infrastructure and Capital Projects	Ian Borg	Labour	9 June 2017	13 January 2020

== Abela Ministry 2020-2022 ==
Portfolio	Minister	Political party	Assumed office	Left office
Prime Minister	Robert Abela	Labour	13 January 2020	20 February 2022
Deputy Prime Minister & Minister for Health	Chris Fearne	Labour	15 January 2020	20 February 2022
Minister for the Economy and Industry	Silvio Schembri	Labour	15 January 2020	20 February 2022
Minister for the Environment, Climate Change and Planning	Aaron Farrugia	Labour	15 January 2020	20 February 2022
Minister for Social Justice & Solidarity, Family and Children's Rights	Michael Falzon	Labour	15 January 2020	20 February 2022
Minister for European & Foreign Affairs	Evarist Bartolo	Labour	15 January 2020	20 February 2022
Minister for Home Affairs, Law Enforcement and National Security	Byron Camilleri	Labour	15 January 2020	20 February 2022
Minister for Transport, Infrastructure and Capital Projects	Ian Borg	Labour	15 January 2020	20 February 2022
Minister for National Heritage, Arts and Local Government	José Herrera	Labour	15 January 2020	20 February 2022
Minister for Social Accommodation	Roderick Galdes	Labour	15 January 2020	20 February 2022
Minister within OPM (Social Dialogue and the Electoral Manifesto's Implementation)	Carmelo Abela	Labour	15 January 2020	20 February 2022
Minister for Agriculture & Fisheries, Food and Animal Rights	Anton Refalo	Labour	21 January 2020 (Note: Reshuffle resulting from Justyne Caruana's first resignation from cabinet.)	20 February 2022
Minister for Agriculture & Fisheries, Animal's Rights and Consumer Protection	Clint Camilleri	Labour	15 January 2020	20 January 2020
Minister for Gozo	Clint Camilleri	Labour	20 January 2020	20 February 2022
Minister for Gozo	Justyne Caruana	Labour	15 January 2020	19 January 2020
Minister for Tourism and Consumer Protection	Clayton Bartolo	Labour	23 November 2020 (Note: Reshuffle resulting from Edward Scicluna's resignations from parliament and cabinet.)	20 February 2022
Minister for Tourism	Julia Farrugia Portelli	Labour	15 January 2020	23 November 2020
Minister for Inclusion and Social Wellbeing	Julia Farrugia Portelli	Labour	23 November 2020	20 February 2022
Minister for Justice and Governance	Edward Zammit Lewis	Labour	23 November 2020	20 February 2022
Minister for Justice, Equality and Governance	Edward Zammit Lewis	Labour	15 January 2020	23 November 2020
Minister for Equality, Innovation, Research and the Co-ordination of the post Covid-19 Strategy	Owen Bonnici	Labour	23 November 2020	20 February 2022
Minister for Education and Sport	Clifton Grima	Labour	27 December 2021 (Note: Reshuffle resulting from Justyne Caruana’s resignation from parliament and second resignation from cabinet.)	20 February 2022
Minister for Education	Justyne Caruana	Labour	23 November 2020	27 December 2021
Minister for Education and Employment	Owen Bonnici	Labour	15 January 2020	23 November 2020
Minister for Finance and Employment	Clyde Caruana	Labour	23 November 2020	20 February 2022
Minister for Finance and Financial Services	Edward Scicluna	Labour	15 January 2020	22 November 2020
Minister for Energy, Enterprise and Sustainable Development	Miriam Dalli	Labour	23 November 2020	20 February 2022
Minister for Energy and Water Management	Michael Farrugia	Labour	15 January 2020	23 November 2020
Minister for Senior Citizens and Active Ageing	Michael Farrugia	Labour	23 November 2020	20 February 2022
