= District 13, Malta =

Electoral district in Malta

District 13
- Parliament of Malta constituency
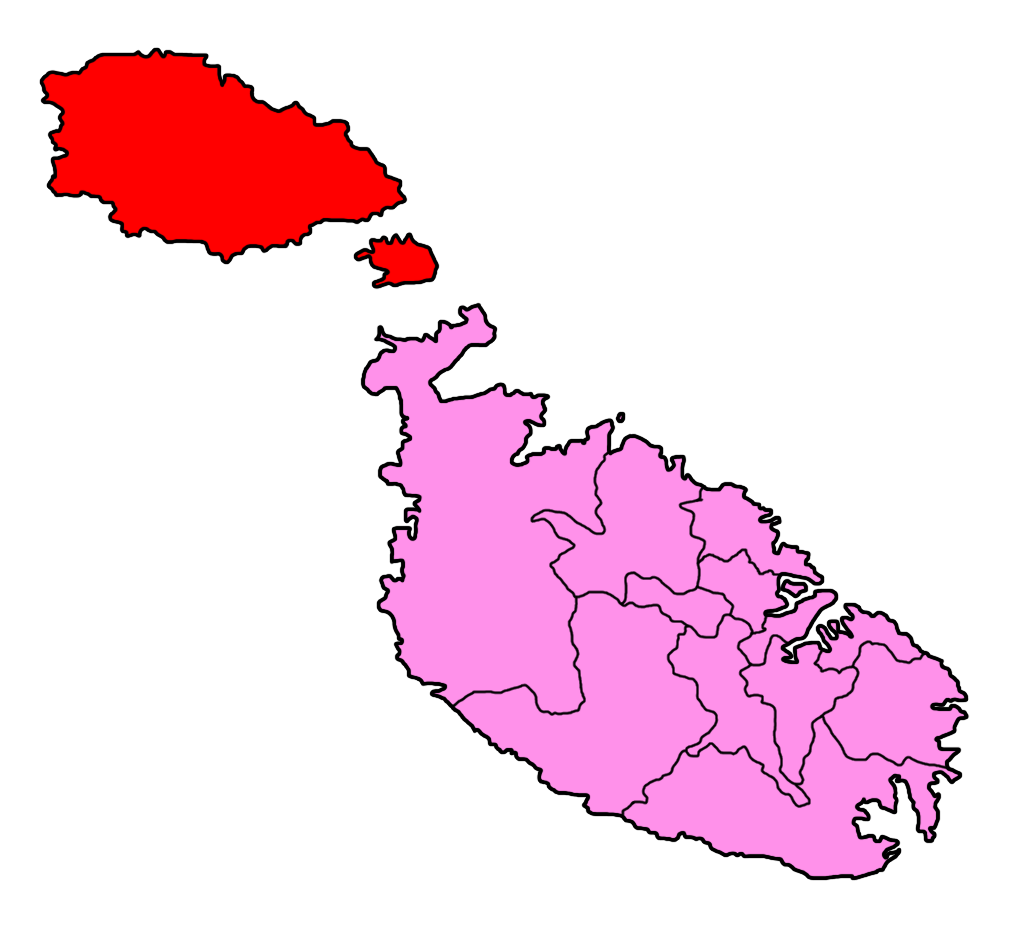
- District within Malta

Current constituency
- Created: 1976
- Seats: 5

District 13 is an electoral district in Malta. It was established in 1976. Its boundaries have changed many times but it currently consists of the islands of Gozo and Comino.

== Representatives ==
Election	Representatives				
1976	Angelo Camilleri (Labour)	Carmelo Buttigieg (Labour)	Amabile Cauchi (Nationalist)	Anton Tabone (Nationalist)	Coronato Attard (Nationalist)
1981	Carmenu Buttigieg (Labour)	Lino Debono (Labour)	Louis Refalo (Nationalist)	Anton Tabone (Nationalist)	Coronato Attard (Nationalist)
1987	Anton Refalo (Labour)	Lino Debono (Labour)	Louis Refalo (Nationalist)	Anton Tabone (Nationalist)	Giovanna Debono (Nationalist)
1992	Anton Refalo (Labour)	Carmel Borg (Labour)	Louis Refalo (Nationalist)	Anton Tabone (Nationalist)	Giovanna Debono (Nationalist)
1996	Anton Refalo (Labour)	Karmenu Borg (Labour)	Victor Galea Pace (Nationalist)	Anton Tabone (Nationalist)	Giovanna Debono (Nationalist)
1998	Anton Refalo (Labour)	Carmelo Borg (Labour)	Victor Galea Pace (Nationalist)	Frederick Azzopardi (Nationalist)	Giovanna Debono (Nationalist)
2003	Anton Refalo (Labour)	Justyne Caruana (Labour)	Franco Galea (Nationalist)	Frederick Azzopardi (Nationalist)	Giovanna Debono (Nationalist)
2008	Anton Refalo (Labour)	Justyne Caruana (Labour)	Chris Said (Nationalist)	Frederick Azzopardi (Nationalist)	Giovanna Debono (Nationalist)
2013	Anton Refalo (Labour)	Justyne Caruana (Labour)	Chris Said (Nationalist)	Frederick Azzopardi (Nationalist)	Giovanna Debono (Nationalist)
2017	Anton Refalo (Labour)	Justyne Caruana (Labour)	Chris Said (Nationalist)	Frederick Azzopardi (Nationalist)	David Stellini (Nationalist)
2022	Anton Refalo (Labour)	Clint Camilleri (Labour)	Chris Said (Nationalist)	Jo Etienne Abela (Labour)	Alex Borg (Nationalist)

== 2017 General Election ==
2017 general election: District 13 - 5 seats
Party	Candidate	FPv%	Count																	
Party	Candidate	FPv%	1	2	3	4	5	6	7	8	9	10	11	12	13	14	15	16	17	18
Labour	Anton Refalo	18.7860488522433	4853	4306																
Nationalist	Chris Said	17.969264119537	4642	4642	4306															
Labour	Justyne Caruana	12.3446754151666	3189	3324	3327	3330	3338	3342	3361	3378	3385	3390	3396	3672	3678	3689	3704	3708	4865	4306
Nationalist	Marthese Portelli	10.1498083846243	2622	2625	2754	2756	2760	2769	2769	2808	2893	2970	3201	3207	3594	4122	4792	4306		
Labour	Clint Camilleri	9.54592962489839	2466	2650	2652	2659	2662	2665	2698	2708	2710	2710	2712	2962	2970	2976	2980	2982	4029	4579
Labour	Franco Mercieca	7.17299578059072	1853	2003	2004	2006	2011	2014	2025	2045	2048	2053	2058	2357	2364	2375	2393	2394		
Nationalist	Frederick Azzopardi	5.67104091665699	1465	1468	1530	1530	1535	1543	1546	1582	1627	1722	1831	1839	2045	2307	3050	3529	3576	3585
Nationalist	Kevin Cutajar	3.48778693918631	901	902	931	932	933	947	947	964	992	1049	1110	1118	1291	1524				
Labour	Joe Cordina	3.01165176324856	778	835	836	837	842	844	867	873	874	875	877							
Nationalist	Ryan Mercieca	2.85681105562652	738	739	766	766	767	772	774	787	813	845	899	899						
Nationalist	David Stellini	2.78326171950606	719	720	754	755	756	765	765	777	873	921	989	994	1078					
Nationalist	Maria Portelli	1.67615066000852	433	434	454	454	454	461	461	472	498	549								
Nationalist	Joseph Ellis	1.31227499709674	339	339	348	348	348	355	356	363	377									
Nationalist	Jason Zammit	1.19614446638021	309	310	321	322	322	328	328	338										
Democratic Alternative	Luke Caruana	0.487748229009407	126	126	126	128	135	147	149											
Nationalist	Vincent Galea	0.375488715983432	97	97	103	103	104	110	110											
Nationalist	Carmel Polidano	0.371617698292881	96	96	98	98	99													
Labour	George Camilleri	0.36387566291178	94	104	104	104	104	104												
Moviment Patrijotti Maltin	Stephen Florian	0.251616149885805	65	65	65	73														
Independent	Nazzareno Bonnici	0.158711725312585	41	41	41															
Moviment Patrijotti Maltin	Alex Pisani	0.0270971238338559	7	7	7															
Electorate: 26, 598 Valid: 24,196 Spoilt: 256 Quota: 4,033 Turnout: 24,452 (91.9%)
