= 2004 European Parliament election in Malta =

- 12 June 2004

5 seats to the European Parliament
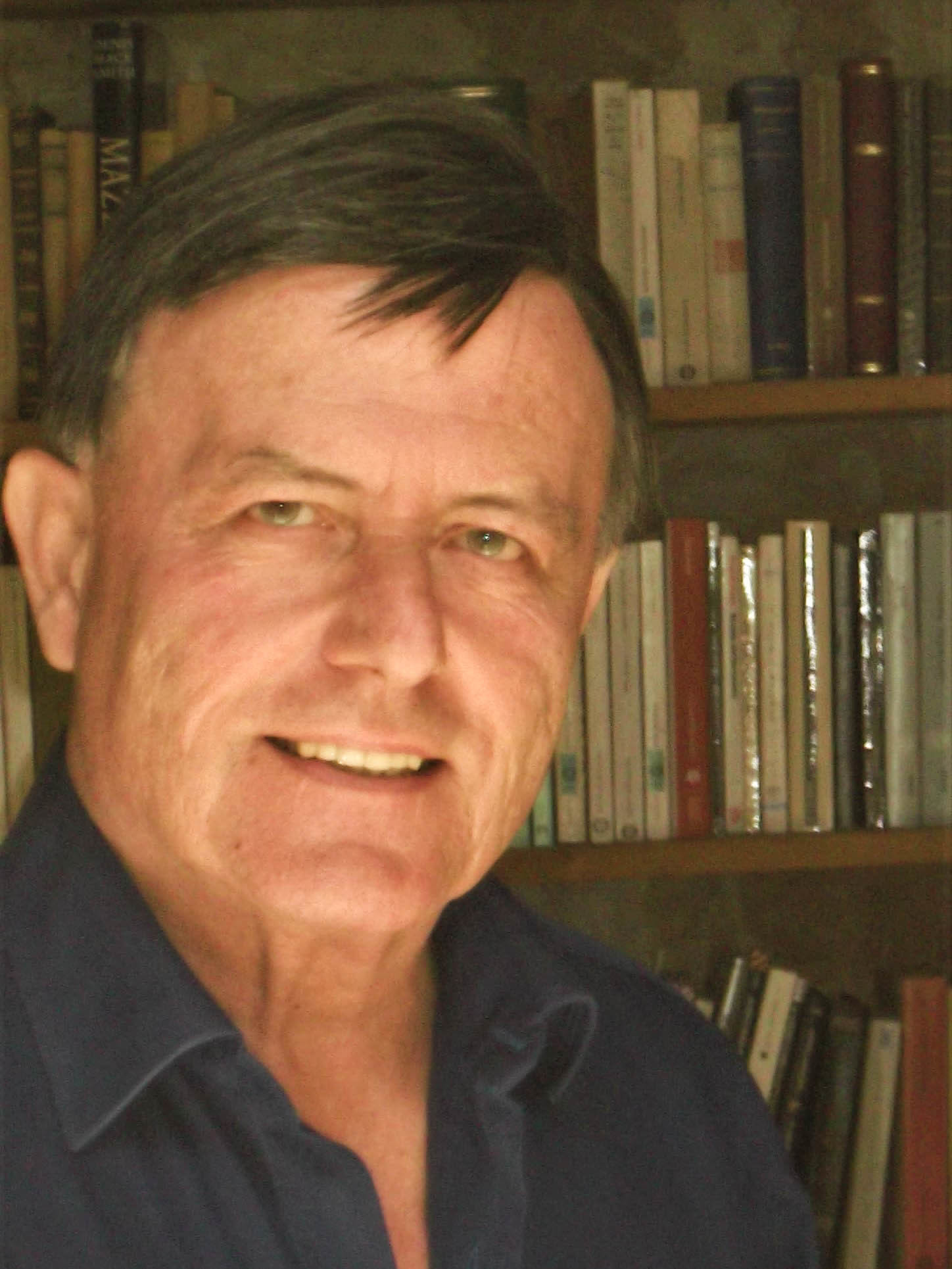

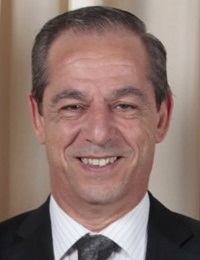
	First party	Second party
Leader	Alfred Sant	Lawrence Gonzi
Party	Labour	Nationalist
Seats won	3	2
Popular vote	118,983	97,688
Percentage	48.42%	39.76%
EP Group	S&D	EPP

An election of Members of the European Parliament representing Malta constituency for the 2004–2009 term was held on 12 June 2004 as part of the wider 2004 European election. The election used Single Transferable Vote. The opposition Malta Labour Party polled strongly.

The Malta Labour Party has won every European parliament election since, as of 2024.

== Results ==
Party	Votes	%	Seats
Labour Party	118,983	48.42	3
Nationalist Party	97,688	39.76	2
Democratic Alternative	22,938	9.33	0
Imperium Europa	1,603	0.65	0
Alpha	756	0.31	0
K.U.L. Ewropa	66	0.03	0
Christian Democratic Republican Party	64	0.03	0
Independents	3,624	1.47	0
Total	245,722	100.00	5
Valid votes	245,722	98.02	
Invalid/blank votes	4,969	1.98	
Total votes	250,691	100.00	
Registered voters/turnout	304,283	82.39	
Source: Electoral Commission

=== Elected MEPs ===
Malta (5)
John Attard-Montalto
Simon Busuttil
David Casa
Louis Grech
Joseph Muscat

=== Results by candidate ===
Malta – 5 seats
Party	Candidate	FPv%	Count																	
Party	Candidate	FPv%	1	2	3	4	5	6	7	8	9	10	11	12	13	14	15	16	17	18
Nationalist	Simon Busuttil	24.0	58,899																	
Labour	Joseph Muscat	15.0	36,958	36,977	37,073	38,101	38,367	38,375	39,630	39,637	39,669	41,984								
Labour	John Attard Montalto	10.3	25,287	25,303	25,534	26,162	26,579	26,601	27,053	27,063	27,109	28,418	28,605	28,622	28,675	34,585	45,732			
Democratic Alternative	Arnold Cassola	9.3	22,938	23,416	24,424	24,473	24,529	24,621	24,713	24,933	25,147	25,253	25,264	25,598	26,100	26,189	26,359	26,372	27,656	29,013
Labour	Louis Grech	6.3	15,371	15,383	15,442	15,842	15,933	15,939	16,766	16,782	16,788	17,744	18,014	18,032	18,066	22,959	33,293	38,052	38,116	38,173
Labour	Joe Debono Grech	5.7	14,080	14,082	14,147	14,468	14,627	14,631	14,886	14,889	14,895	15,986	16,094	16,101	16,113					
Labour	Glenn Bedingfield	5.5	13,435	13,439	13,519	13,829	14,062	14,064	14,396	14,397	14,410	16,480	16,931	16,940	16,956	21,978				
Nationalist	David Casa	3.6	8,782	17,608	17,767	17,769	18,120	19,101	19,106	20,246	22,528	22,534	22,534	25,702	30,819	30,831	30,860	30,863	52,963	
Nationalist	Joanna Drake	3.2	7,781	11,879	11,948	11,951	12,102	12,830	12,842	13,976	15,099	15,117	15,119	18,122	24,094	24,106	24,129	24,132		
Labour	Owen Bonnici	3.0	7,280	7,286	7,329	7,491	7,581	7,584	7,961	7,966	7,976									
Nationalist	Joe Friggieri	2.2	5,457	7,010	7,083	7,088	7,175	7,886	7,893	8,521	9,544	9,556	9,556	12,113						
Nationalist	Anton Tabone	2.2	5,439	5,746	5,803	5,808	5,908	6,161	6,162	6,615										
Nationalist	Roberta Tedesco Triccas	2.1	5,204	6,449	6,522	6,523	6,638	6,956	6,962	7,715	9,328	9,338	9,339							
Labour	Robert Micallef	1.4	3,390	3,395	3,425	3,658	3,686	3,688												
Labour	Wenzu Mintoff	1.3	3,182	3,186	3,216															
Nationalist	Ian Spiteri Bailey	1.3	3,137	4,020	4,061	4,061	4,095	4,426	4,431											
Independent	Carmelo Farrugia	1.3	3,119	3,131	3,304	3,308														
Labour	Michael Falzon	1.2	2,989	3,437	3,472	3,475	3,551													
Imperium Europa	Norman Lowell	0.7	1,603	1,619																
Alpha Liberal Democratic Party	Emmy Bezzina	0.3	717	721																
Independent	Nazzareno Bonnici	0.07	183	185																
Independent	Damian Chukwuemeka Iwueke	0.06	153	157																
Independent	Victor Zammit	0.06	145	146																
KUL Ewropa	Herbert Jones Cecil	0.03	66	66																
Christian Democratic Republican Party	Mark Von Brockdorff	0.03	64	64																
Alpha Liberal Democratic Party	John Zammit	0.02	39	39																
Independent	Christopher Sciberras	0.009	24	24																
Electorate: 304,283 Valid: 245,722 Spoilt: 4,969 Quota: 40,954 Turnout: 250,691
