= Women in Maltese general elections =

Fifteen general elections have been contested since the granting of universal suffrage in Malta. Only 73 women have contested in these elections. The number of men, on the other hand, has exceeded 1000. The number of women contesting general elections has, however, increased over the years. In fact, the 1998 elections saw 24 women candidates participating, the highest number to date, with six of these getting elected, registering a 25 percent success rate.

The smallest number of female candidates was in 1947, when a universal suffrage was introduced, and these numbered only two. However, the result showed a 50 percent success rate, since Agatha Barbara was elected. The election of 1955 saw the lowest percentage of women candidates being elected with a 14.3 percent success rate, when only one candidate out of seven was elected. After this discouraging result, the success rate rose slowly until, in the 1976 election, there was a 42.3 percent success rate for women candidates. At that time, three out of seven contestants were returned. These were two Labour candidates Agatha Barbara and Evelyn Bonaci, while Anne Agius Ferrante from the PN obtained a seat following a by-election.

However, the success rates of the first and third elections won by female candidates have never been matched up till now (in 1947 it reached 50 percent while in 1951 it was 57.1 percent). The rate slowly rose to 42.9 percent in 1976, but this momentum was lost and success fell to 20 percent in 1981. It rose to just 28.6 percent in 2003. The 2003 election gave the same results as that of 1998, with six women parliamentarians, three each for the two main political parties.

== Malta Labour Party women candidates ==
Since the granting of the right to vote, the Malta Labour Party (MLP) has consistently fielded women in all general elections, and has always (except during the 1992-96 legislature) had at least one female member of parliament over all years. One in general elections of 1947, 1950, 1953, 1955, 1962, and 1987, two female members in 1951, 1966, 1971, 1976, 1981, and 1996, three members in 1998 and 2003, and four members in 2008. The overall number of women contesting under the MLP flag up to the 2003 election is 57, altogether winning 27 seats.

The ten female candidates, and the number of times they have been successful, are:

- Agatha Barbara: ten times
- Evelyn Bonaci: three times
- Julia Farrugia Portelli: twice
- Rebecca Buttigieg: once
- Helena Dalli: 6 times
- Marie-Louise Coleiro Preca: 3 times
- Justyne Caruana: 4 times
- Marlene Farrugia: twice
- Rosianne Cutajar: twice
- Miriam Dalli: twice

== Partit Nazzjonalista (PN) women candidates ==
The Nationalist Party (Partit Nazzjonalista, PN), on the other hand, fielded its first female candidate, Mary Louise Muscat Manduca, in 1950, but it was Anne Agius Ferrante, for the first time, successfully contested the 1976 elections under PN flag, and was elected in a by-election, It was not before 1987 that another PN female candidate made it to parliament - Giovanna Debono for Gozo. The number of PN candidates rose considerably over the last years. Up to 2003, 57 women had contested the elections and won 13 seats.

Women elected to parliament under the banner of the PN include:

- Graziella Galea: twice
- Claudette Buttigieg: 3 times
- Kristy Debono: twice
- Giovanna Debono: 6 times
- Helen D'Amato: 3 times
- Dolores Cristina: 3 times
- Paula Mifsud Bonnici: twice
- Marthese Portelli: twice

== Alternattiva Demokratika women candidates ==
The Democratic Alternative (Alternattiva Demokratika, AD) had a female candidate in the last three elections (1996, 1998 and 2003). However, no success has been registered.

== Other parties' women candidates ==
Two other women were successful at general elections. These were Mabel Strickland (three times), twice with the Constitutional Party and once with the Progressive Constitutionalist Party (Malta), and Celia de Trafford Strickland (twice), with the Constitutional Party.

Other political parties that had a female candidate in the general elections, were:

- Democratic Action Party: one candidate in 1947 and 1950.
- The Constitutional Party: three candidates in 1950, two candidates in 1951, and one candidate in 1953 and 1955.
- The Malta Workers Party: two candidates in 1950 and 1951.
- The Progressive Constitutionalist Party: one candidate in 1953, 1955, 1962, and 1966, and two candidates in 1971.
- The Christian Workers' Party: two candidates in 1962 and 1966
- The Democratic Christian Party: one candidate in 1962
- The Democratic Nationalist Party: two candidates in 1962
- The Communist Party of Malta: one candidate in 1987
- Independent candidate, there was one in 1992.
- National Action, there was one in 2008.

== Important positions in the Maltese Parliament held by women ==
Agatha Barbara won ten consecutive elections between 1947 and 1981 and held cabinet posts as Minister of Education twice and as Minister for Labour, Social Service and Culture. In 1982, she was the first woman to be nominated President of the Republic of Malta.

In 1995 Giovanna Debono was appointed Parliamentary Secretary for Family and Social Affairs within the Ministry for Social Development.

The next female to be appointed Parliamentary Secretary was Helena Dalli. In 1996, she was put in charge of Women's Rights within the Office of the Prime Minister. Dr Dalli is also the first Labour woman to be elected from two electoral districts. This was in the 2008 general election. Other women candidates had previously contested on two districts but failed to get elected from both.

Myriam Spiteri Debono was chosen as the first female Speaker of the House of Representatives, also in 1996.

In April 2003, Giovanna Debono was given the portfolio as Minister for Gozo, while Dolores Cristina was given the post of Parliamentary Secretary in the Ministry for Social Policy. In the 2004 reshuffle, with Dr. Lawrence Gonzi as Prime Minister, Giovanna Debono kept her previous portfolio, while Dolores Cristina was appointed Minister of the Family and Social Solidarity, and now Ministry for Education and Helen D'Amato was appointed Parliamentary Secretary in the Ministry of Health.
