= Joe Mizzi =

Maltese politician

Joe Mizzi MP

Minister for Energy and Water Management
- In office 9 June 2017 – 15 January 2020
- Prime Minister: Joseph Muscat
- Preceded by: Konrad Mizzi
- Succeeded by: Michael Farrugia

Minister for Transport and Infrastructure
- In office 13 March 2013 – 3 June 2017
- Prime Minister: Joseph Muscat
- Preceded by: Austin Gatt
- Succeeded by: Ian Borg

Member of the Parliament of Malta for District 2
- In office 1987–2022

Personal details
- Party: Labour

Joe Mizzi is a Maltese politician from the Labour Party. He served as a member of the Parliament of Malta.

== Career ==
Mizzi met Elizabeth II on two occasions.

In 2022, Mizzi was appointed to the Authority for Transport in Malta.

In January 2024, Mizzi was appointed Chairperson for the Fondazzjoni Kottonera.

== See also ==
- List of members of the parliament of Malta, 2008–2013
- Maltese Government 2013–2017
- Maltese Government 2017–2022
- List of members of the parliament of Malta, 2017–2022
