= Francesca Camilleri Vettiger =

Maltese diplomat and Permanent Representative to the Council of Europe

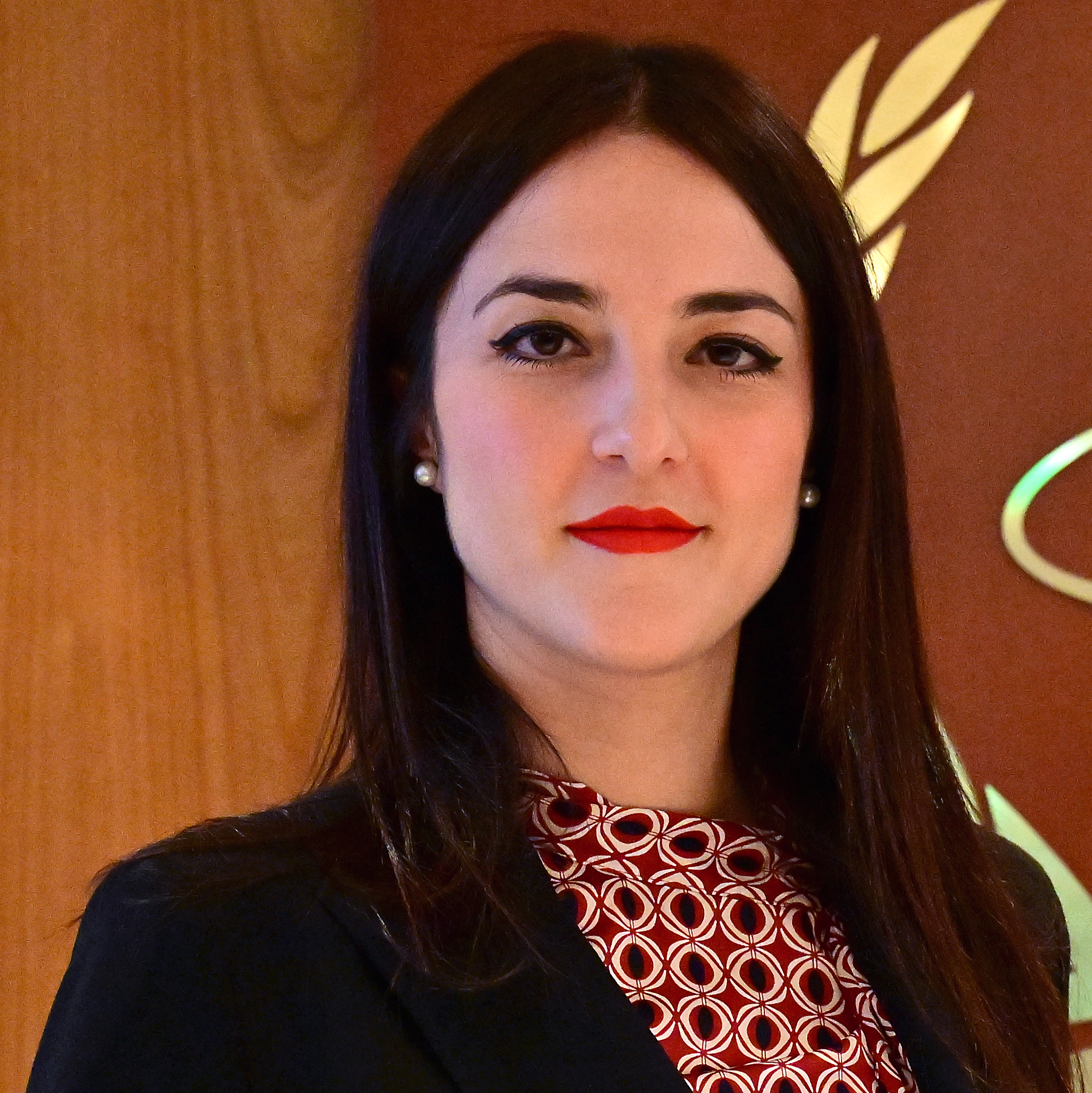
- in 2026
- Born: Francesca Camilleri
- Education: University of Malta, Utrecht University and the University of London
- Occupation: diplomat
- Known for: ambassador
- Spouse: Mr Vettiger
- Relatives: Clint Camilleri (brother)

Dr Francesca Camilleri Vettiger (born ~1989–1991) is a Maltese diplomat and lawyer, who served as Permanent Representative of Malta to the Council of Europe between June 2023 and January 2026, leading Malta’s Presidency of the Council of Europe in 2025. As from February 2026, she serves as Malta’s Ambassador to Austria and Permanent Representative to the United Nations, OSCE, IAEA and other International Organizations in Vienna.

== Early life and education ==
Francesca Camilleri obtained a Bachelor of Laws (LL.B.), a Diploma of Notary Public, and a Doctor of Laws (LL.D.) in May 2015 from the University of Malta. Shortly after graduating she obtained the warrant to practice as a lawyer in Malta in early 2026. In the following years she also earned a Master of Laws (LL.M.) in International Human Rights Law from Utrecht University and a Master of Science (MSc) in Global Health Policy from the London School of Hygiene and Tropical Medicine within the University of London.

== Diplomatic career ==
Upon graduation in 2015, Francesca Camilleri joined the cabinet of Malta's deputy prime minister Louis Grech. The following year, Camilleri joined Malta's diplomatic service, benefiting from a rapid career. In 2016 she was posted to Geneva as Senior Policy Officer to represent Malta at the World Trade Organization, chairing the EU Coordination Meetings during Malta's Presidency of the Council of the European Union (January–June 2017).

In 2019 Camilleri returned to Malta's Foreign Ministry as Coordinator for International Human Rights Law matters. She was rapidly posted to Strasbourg at the Permanent Representation of Malta to the Council of Europe, first as a Counsellor in April 2019, then as Deputy Permanent Representative (a senior diplomatic posting) from September 2020.

=== Permanent representative to the Council of Europe ===
In June 2023, while in her early 30s, Camilleri Vettiger was appointed Ambassador and Permanent Representative of Malta to the Council of Europe, based in Strasbourg. At the time of her appointment, the press reported of complaints of senior diplomats about “nepotism” on the part of Foreign Minister Ian Borg.

During Malta's Presidency of the Committee of Ministers of the Council of Europe (May–November 2025), she served as President of the Committee of Ministers’ Deputies, chairing meetings of permanent representatives. Some of these meetings focused on thematic issues, including gender stereotypes and gender‑based violence.

Under her leadership in Strasbourg, Malta has undertaken initiatives including signing voluntary contributions to support Council of Europe regional programmes and ratifying Council of Europe conventions including the Landscape Convention.

As Permanent Representative, Camilleri Vettiger has represented Malta at international forums, including addressing the Lisbon Forum of the North-South Centre, and the Caux Democracy Forum in July 2025 on the defence of democratic values and human rights. She also served as Chairwoman of the North-South Centre of the Council of Europe, where she addressed the annual North-South Prize Awards at the Portuguese Parliament.

=== Ambassador to Austria and Permanent Representative to the OSCE ===
In February 2026, Camilleri Vettiger was appointed as Ambassador of Malta to Austria and Permanent Representative of Malta to the OSCE, United Nations, and other organisations in Vienna.

Shortly after taking up this new Ambassadorial post, she received the Ambassador of the year 2026 award, followed by the MARA Dedication to Public Service award.
