= Anne Agius Ferrante =

Maltese politician (1925–2023)

The Honourable Anne Agius Ferrante MP

Member of Parliament
- In office 1980–1981

Personal details
- Born: 20 August 1925 Mdina, Crown Colony of Malta
- Died: 5 April 2023 (aged 97) Mosta, Malta
- Party: Nationalist Party

Anne Agius Ferrante (20 August 1925 – 5 April 2023) was a Maltese politician who served in the Parliament of Malta from 1980 until 1981 as a member of the Nationalist Party.

== Biography ==
Ferrante was born in Mdina on 20 August 1925, the daughter of Sir Philip Pullicino, who served as attorney general of Malta. Between 1957 and 1960, she served as the Commissioner of the Island of Malta for the Girl Guides Association.

In 1980, following the death of George Borg Olivier, Ferrante was elected to the House of Representatives via by-election, making her the first female Nationalist Party member to be nationally elected. She continued to hold her seat until the next election was held in 1981.

Ferrante lost her husband at an early age, but devoted herself to raising her children Susan Zammit Tabona and Timothy. Ferrante died in Mosta on 5 April 2023, at the age of 97.
