= Beppe Fenech Adami =

Maltese politician

Beppe Fenech Adami is a Maltese politician from the Nationalist Party. He was elected to the Parliament of Malta in the 2013, 2017 and 2022 Maltese General Elections, always from the 8th District.

== Personal life ==
His father is former Prime Minister and President of Malta, Eddie Fenech Adami. His mother is the late Mary Fenech Adami, who served as First Lady of Malta from 2004 to 2009. Beppe Fenech Adami is married to Ann Fenech Adami, and they have a family together. In 2014 Beppe had surgery in London on a 15 cm tumour on his back.

== See also ==
- List of members of the parliament of Malta, 2008–2013
- List of members of the parliament of Malta, 2013–2017
- List of members of the parliament of Malta, 2017–2022
- List of members of the parliament of Malta, 2022–2027
