= Stephen Spiteri (politician) =

Maltese politician

Stephen Spiteri is a Maltese politician from the Partit Nazzjonalista. Since the 2008 general election, he has been the Member of Parliament for District 2. He is a medical practitioner by profession.

== See also ==
- List of members of the parliament of Malta, 2008–2013
- List of members of the parliament of Malta, 2013–2017
- List of members of the parliament of Malta, 2017–2022
- List of members of the parliament of Malta, 2022–2027
