= Anton Tabone =

Maltese politician (born 1937)

Speaker of the House of Representatives of Malta
- In office April 14, 1998 – September 10, 2008
- Preceded by: Myriam Spiteri Debono
- Succeeded by: Louis Galea

First Minister for Gozo Affairs
- In office 1987–1996
- Preceded by: established
- Succeeded by: Anton Refalo

Personal details
- Born: November 15, 1937 (age 88) Gozo, Malta
- Other political affiliations: Nationalist Party
- Occupation: Retired

Anton Tabone (born 15 November 1937) is a Maltese politician. Appointed the first Minister for Gozo Affairs in 1987 he was re-appointed in the same portfolio in 1992, a post he held up to 1996. Between 1998 and 2008 he served as Speaker of the House of Representatives.

Whilst Minister for Gozo he promoted the regional aspect of the island in the national context and within the Conference of Peripheral and Maritime Regions of Europe (CPMR), wherein Gozo participates as a full Member. As Speaker of the House he promoted Malta’s initiative to establish a Parliamentary Assembly of the Mediterranean and the setting up of its Secretariat in Malta. He undertook with success the difficult transition of Malta’s Parliament from that of a non-member state to one of a member state when Malta became a Member of the European Union in 2004. He was also very active in promoting Parliament’s autonomy by requesting the Management Efficiency Unit in the Office of the Prime Minister to submit a report on the ‘Strengthening of the House of Representatives — The Case For Autonomy’ which report was laid on the Table of the House in mid-2005.

Tabone helped put Gozo and the Gozitans’ interests to the fore with the result that nowadays the island’s dimension is being considered at the forefront of both the national policy as well as in the EU territorial dimension.

In 2008 the National Order of Merit in the grade of Companion was conferred on Mr Tabone. He served as Acting President of Malta between 2009 and 2012.

== Political career ==
Anton Tabone was elected in the interests of the Nationalist Party in 1966 and sat in Parliament for over forty-two years, initially as a backbencher and successively as Shadow Minister, Minister, and eventually as a Speaker. He was also member of the N.P. Executive Committee, and a member of the now defunct Gozo Civic Council where he chaired several committees of the said Council.

== Sources ==
- "Anton Tabone, Il-Pont bejn Għawdex Reġjun u Malta Nazzjon - The Malta Independent". www.independent.com.mt.
- Grech, Sergio (2017). Anton Tabone: Il-Pont bejn Għawdex Reġjun u Malta Nazzjon (in Maltese). Kite. ISBN 978-99957-50-40-4.
- Gruppe, Bcher (2010). Minister: Louis Galea, Austin Gatt, Anton Tabone, Tonio Fenech, Dolores Cristina, Giovanna Debono, Carmelo Mifsud Bonnici (in German). General Books LLC. ISBN 978-1-159-17842-0.
