= Clint Camilleri =

Maltese politician (born 1988)

Honourable Clint Camilleri MP
- Camilleri in 2025

Minister for Gozo
- Incumbent
- Assumed office 20 January 2020
- Prime Minister: Robert Abela
- Preceded by: Justyne Caruana

Member of Parliament
- Incumbent
- Assumed office 24 June 2017

Minister for Agriculture, Fisheries, Animal Rights and Consumer Protection
- In office 15 January 2020 – 19 January 2020

Parliamentary Secretary for Agriculture, Fisheries and Animal Rights
- In office 9 June 2017 – 15 January 2020
- Preceded by: Roderick Galdes
- Succeeded by: Alicia Bugeja Said

Mayor of Qala
- In office 2012–2017
- Preceded by: Paul Buttigieg
- Succeeded by: Paul Buttigieg

Personal details
- Born: 24 February 1988 (age 38) Gozo, Malta
- Party: Partit Laburista
- Spouse: Dr. Deborah Camilleri (née Mercieca)
- Children: 2
- Relatives: Francesca Camilleri Vettiger (sister)
- Education: University of Malta; University of Kentucky
- Occupation: Politician; architect; civil engineer

Clint Camilleri MP (born 24 February 1988) is a Maltese politician, architect and civil engineer, currently serving as Minister for Gozo in the Prime Minister Robert Abela's cabinet since 2020. Among the youngest members of cabinet, Camilleri previously served as a Parliamentary Secretary and a Minister in former Prime Minister Joseph Muscat's cabinet. Prior to becoming a Member of Parliament and Minister, he was the Mayor of Qala in 2017.

== Family and education ==
Clint Camilleri was born on 24 February 1988, to Anton Camilleri and Marlene née Gauci. Anton served on the Qala local council as a councillor and as Mayor, and was vice-president of the Gozo Football Association until his death in 2009. Anton's father Anġlu Camilleri was a Labour member of parliament from August 1971 until November 1981. Anton and Anġlu Camilleri, originally from Nadur, were popularly known with the family nickname "Ta' Bedeqq".

Clint Camilleri graduated from the University of Malta in architecture and from the University of Kentucky in civil engineering.

== Political career ==
He began his political career in 2012 elected as the mayor of the Qala Local Council and in 2014 contest in the European Parliament elections but lost. He contested in 2017 as member in the Parliament and won serving the 13th electoral district.

Camilleri served as the Parliamentary Secretary for Agriculture, Fisheries and Animal Rights from 2017 to 2020 and was acting minister for four days.

He succeeded Justyne Caruana, who had resigned due to a corruption scandal. He is a serving member under the platform of Labour Party.

== Controversy ==
An investigation by Standards Commissioner Joseph Azzopardi found that Camilleri, together with fellow Minister Clayton Bartolo, breached the ministerial code of ethics through a consultancy contract they gave Amanda Muscat, at the time, Minister Bartolo’s girlfriend and personal secretary.

Commissioner Azzopardi found that following the start of the extramarital relationship between Minister Bartolo and Amanda Muscat in 2020 – then his private secretary – the latter was promoted to a much higher grade as policy consultant, a position for which she was not qualified for

In further embarrassing conclusions, the Commissioner established that despite her supposed move to the Gozo ministry, Amanda Muscat never worked at Clint Camilleri’s Ministry and never wrote a single consultancy report for which she was supposedly engaged.

Instead, the Commissioner found that Muscat continued to work at Clayton Bartolo’s ministry as his private secretary but received her salary from the Gozo ministry.

== Personal life ==
Clint Camilleri is married to Dr. Deborah Camilleri née Mercieca, a lawyer who is Gozo Manager for Transport Malta. They married on 27 May 2018 and have 2 daughters.

Camilleri is a hunter and a member of the hunter's association and lobby group Federation for Hunting & Conservation (FKNK, Maltese: Federazzjoni Kaċċaturi Nassaba Konservazzjonisti).
