= José Herrera (Maltese politician) =

Maltese politician (born 1961)

José Herrera MP
- Herrera in 2018

Minister for Environment, Sustainable Development, and Climate Change
- In office 28 April 2016 – 13 January 2020

Minister for National Heritage, Arts and Local Government
- In office 15 January 2020 – 20 February 2022
- Succeeded by: Owen Bonnici

Personal details
- Born: 16 November 1961 (age 64)
- Party: Labour
- Education: University of Malta

José A. Herrera (born 16 November 1961) is a Maltese lawyer and politician from the Labour Party.

== Career ==
In 2023, he was appointed chairman of the Community Malta Agency.

== See also ==
- Maltese Government 2017–2022
- List of members of the parliament of Malta, 2017–2022
