= Ministry for Gozo =

Maltese government ministry

- Ministeru għal Għawdex

Agency overview
- Formed: 1987
- Jurisdiction: Government of Malta
- Headquarters: Victoria, Gozo
- Agency executive: Clint Camilleri, Minister for Gozo
- Website: gozo.gov.mt

The Ministry for Gozo (Maltese: Ministeru għal Għawdex) formerly Ministry for Gozo and Planning is the ministry of the Government of Malta with responsibility for the island of Gozo. It was established in 1987.

On 4 June 2026, during the reshuffle of the cabinet, the ministry was renamed to the Ministry for Gozo.

== List of Ministers ==
Ministers have been:

- Anton Tabone, 1987–1996
- Anton Refalo, 1996–1998, as Parliamentary Secretary for Gozo
- Giovanna Debono, 1998–2013
- Anton Refalo, 2013–2017
- Justyne Caruana, 2017–2020.
- Clint Camilleri, 2020–present
