= Giovanna Debono =

Maltese politician (born 1956)

Minister for Gozo
- In office 6 September 1998 – 10 March 2013
- Prime Minister: Eddie Fenech Adami; Lawrence Gonzi
- Preceded by: Anton Refalo
- Succeeded by: Anton Refalo

Personal details
- Born: 25 November 1956 (age 69) Victoria, Gozo, Crown Colony of Malta
- Party: Independent (2015-2017)
- Other political affiliations: Nationalist Party (1987-2015)
- Spouse: Anthony Debono
- Children: 2

Giovanna Debono (née Attard; born November 25, 1956) was the Minister for Gozo (Maltese: Ministru għal Għawdex) in a number of Nationalist governments.

== Early life ==
Debono was born in Victoria on the island of Gozo. She is the daughter of the late Coronato Attard, who was a Member of Parliament from 1965 to 1987, and Anna née Tabone.

She completed her studies at the University of Malta from where she obtained a B.A. in Education. From 1981 to 1987, she worked as a teacher with the Education Department in Malta.

== Public life ==
Debono was first elected to the House of Representatives in 1987, making her the second female Nationalist Party member to be nationally elected. She has been re-elected at each subsequent election. She was appointed as Parliamentary Secretary in the Ministry for Social Development on April 17, 1995, and was subsequently appointed as Minister for Gozo in 1998. She was re-appointed to that post in 2003, confirmed in 2004, and further re-appointed in 2008. She was succeeded as Minister of Gozo by Anton Refalo after the Nationalists lost the general election of 2013.

In May 2015, Debono resigned from the Nationalist Party after her husband was accused of fraud. She retained her seat in parliament as an independent politician. She did not contest the 2017 Maltese general elections and therefore retired from Maltese politics.
