= Christopher Agius =

Maltese politician

Christopher (Chris) Agius is a Maltese politician from the Labour Party. He has been a Member of Parliament representing District 2 since the 1996 Maltese general election.
