= Michael Farrugia =

Maltese politician (born 1956)

Michael Farrugia MP
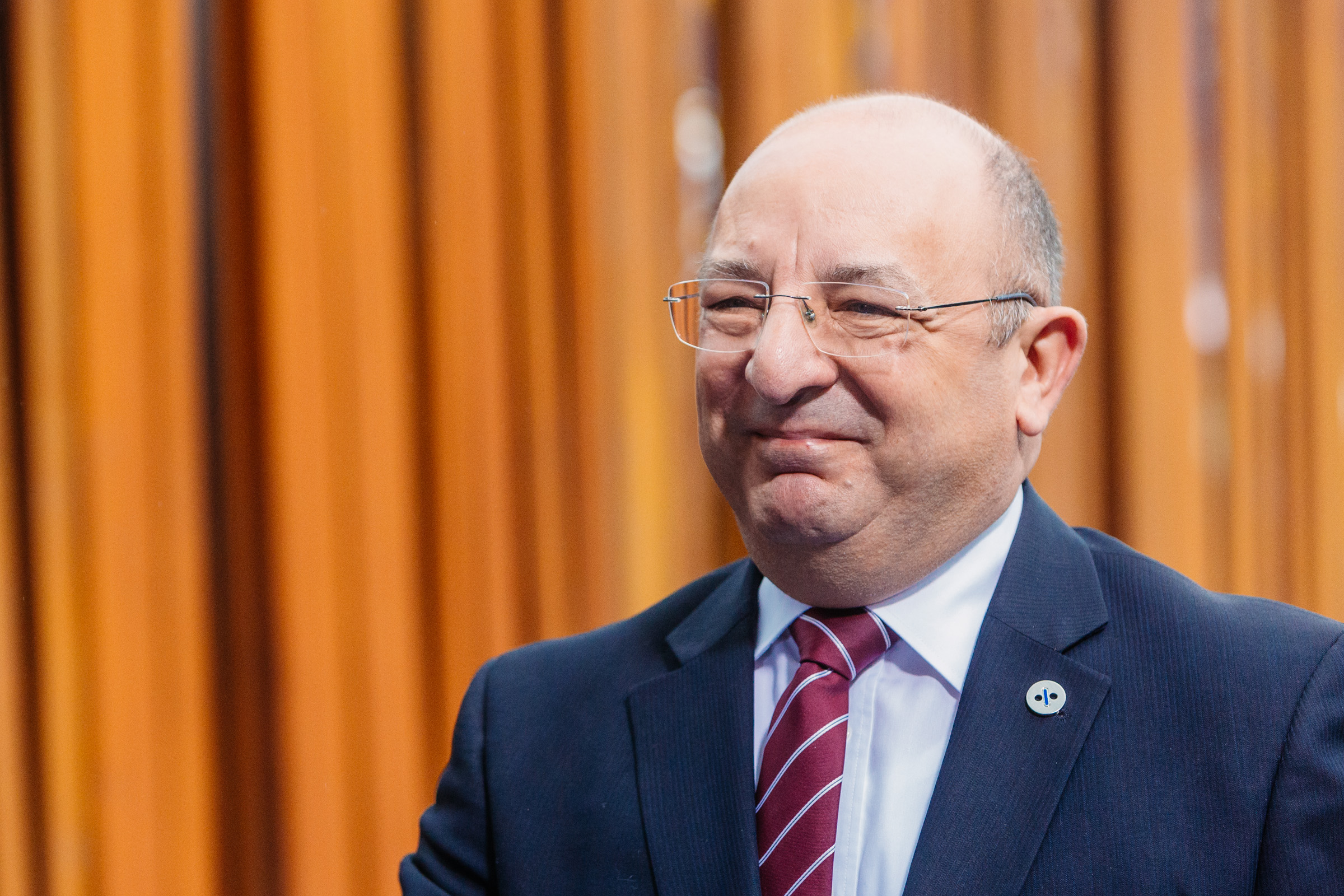
- Farrugia in 2017

Minister for Senior Citizens and Active Ageing
- In office 23 November 2020 – 20 February 2022

Minister for Energy and Water Management
- In office 15 January 2020 – 23 November 2020

Minister for Home Affairs of Malta
- In office June 2017 – January 2020
- Preceded by: Carmelo Abela
- Succeeded by: Byron Camilleri

Personal details
- Born: 28 December 1956 (age 69)
- Party: Labour

Michael Farrugia (born 28 December 1956) is a Maltese politician from the Labour Party who was Home Affairs Minister between June 2017 and January 2020.

== Career ==
Farrugia served as Minister for Family and Social Solidarity from 29 March 2014 to 9 June 2017.

In 2023, he was appointed acting Speaker.

== See also ==
- List of members of the parliament of Malta, 2008–2013
- List of members of the parliament of Malta, 2013–2017
- List of members of the parliament of Malta, 2017–2022
- List of members of the parliament of Malta, 2022–2027
