= Karmenu Vella =

Maltese politician (born 1950)

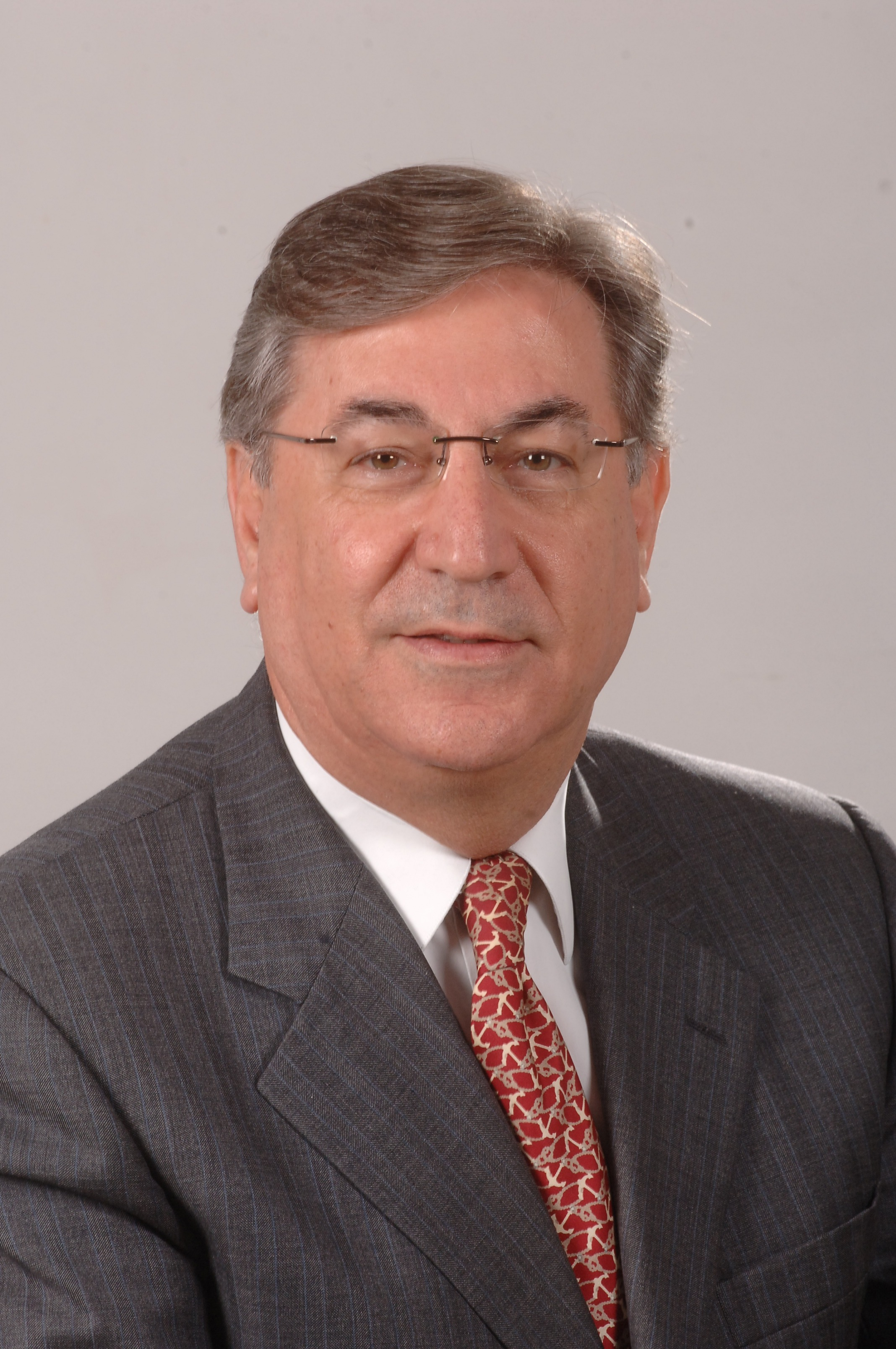
- Official portrait, 2014

European Commissioner for the Environment, Maritime Affairs and Fisheries
- In office 1 November 2014 – 30 November 2019
- Commission: Juncker
- Preceded by: Janez Potočnik (Environment); Maria Damanaki (Maritime; Affairs and Fisheries)
- Succeeded by: Virginijus Sinkevičius

Personal details
- Born: 19 June 1950 (age 75) Żurrieq, Crown Colony of Malta
- Party: Labour Party
- Spouse: Marianne Buhagiar
- Children: 2
- Education: University of Malta; Sheffield Hallam University
- Website: Official website

Karmenu Vella KOM (born 19 June 1950) is a Maltese politician and former member of the European Commission, in charge of Environment, Maritime Affairs and Fisheries between 2014 and 2019. He has been one of the longest serving Maltese Parliamentarian with the Maltese Labour Party. He was appointed Companion of the National Order of Merit of Malta in 2019.

== Biography ==
Vella was born on 19 June 1950, in Zurrieq and is the eldest of three children. Vella lived in Zurrieq for 33 years from 1950 till 1983. He now lives in Birzebbugia with his wife Marianne (née Buhagiar). The couple has two sons, John married to Miriam Dalli, and Philip married to Rania (née Mamo). He is also a grandfather of two, Adam and Jack.

== Education ==
After his primary education in Zurrieq and his secondary education at the Lyceum Secondary School, Vella attended his pre-tertiary education at the University of Malta's Junior College until 1968.

Karmenu Vella attended the Royal University of Malta where he was conferred with a Bachelor of Arts in Architectural Studies in 1970, and then graduated as an Architect and Civil Engineer in 1973.

Between 1998 and 2000 he studied at Sheffield Hallam University where he was awarded a Master of Science degree in Tourism.

== Political career ==
=== Labour Party ===
Karmenu Vella has had a long and distinguished service in the Labour Party of Malta.

He started with the Labour Party in 1968 as a member of the National Executive Committee of the Labour Youth Movement and later a member of the International Union of Socialist Youth (IUSY).

More recently, apart from being a member on the Labour Party's National Executive, Karmenu Vella held the post of Member and Group Co-ordinator for the Labour Party Parliamentary Group. In 2011 he was in charge of the electoral programme for the Maltese Labour Party for the 2013 general elections.

=== Parliament and national government ===
In 1968, at the age of 18, Karmenu Vella was elected as the youngest member of the Zurrieq Civic Council and served as such until 1970.

In 1976 he contested the general elections for the first time and was elected as the youngest Member of Parliament and since then served as Maltese Parliamentarian for thirty eight uninterrupted years as a Labour Member of Parliament.

During his Parliamentary term in government, Vella has been nominated Minister four times during the Labour Party Government. He was Minister for Public Works between 1981 and 1984, Minister for Industry from 1984 to 1987, Minister for Tourism between 1996 and 1998 and was again appointed as Tourism Minister in March 2013 until his nomination as EU Commissioner Designate in 2014.

During his Parliamentary term in opposition, he served as Shadow Minister for Tourism from 1998 to 2011 and between 2011 and 2013 was a Shadow Minister for Finance.

== Professional career ==
During his professional career, Karmenu Vella has held a number of managerial and directorship posts.

In 1973 he started his own private practice as an Architect and Civil Engineer, and during that same year he was appointed a director until 1976 on Mid Med Bank - Malta.

In 1974 he joined the Libyan Arab Maltese Holding Company as its Managing Director until 1981. During that period he also served as a director on a number of the company's subsidiaries which included: Mediterranean Aviation Co Ltd., Medelec Switchgear Co Ltd., Mediterranean Power Electric Co Ltd., Rotos Zirayia Pumps Co Ltd., and Plastic Processing Co Ltd.

In 2001 he was appointed executive chairman of Corinthia Hotels International until 2007 and then executive chairman of Corinthia's Mediterranean Construction Co Ltd., until 2010.

In 2010 he joined Betfair Group Ltd. as a director and sat on SMS-Mondial Travel Group's Board as chairman until 2013.

In 2015 Vella had launched the Pan-European Dialogue for Cruise Tourism.

== Non-profit organisations ==
In 2007 Karmenu Vella was the founding chairman of the Maltese Turkish Business Council. Between 2007 and 2013 he was appointed a member of the Vodafone Malta Foundation.

== Sports and cultural organisations ==
Karmenu has been very active in sports and cultural activities. He has been for a number of years the Honorary President for Birzebbugia Aquatic Sports Club, Honorary President for Zurrieq Bocci Club and Honorary President for Queen Victoria Band Club, Zurrieq.

== Awards ==
Vella was appointed Companion of the National Order of Merit in the 2019 Republic Day awards by President George Vella, in recognition of his service to the country.

Political offices
Preceded by Tonio Borg	Maltese European Commissioner; 2014–2019	Succeeded by Helena Dalli
Preceded by Janez Potočnik as European Commissioner for Environment	European Commissioner for the Environment, Maritime Affairs and Fisheries; 2014–2019	Succeeded by Virginijus Sinkevičius
Preceded by Maria Damanaki as European Commissioner for Maritime Affairs and Fisheries	European Commissioner for the Environment, Maritime Affairs and Fisheries; 2014–2019	Succeeded by Virginijus Sinkevičius
