= Helena Dalli =

Maltese politician (born 1962)

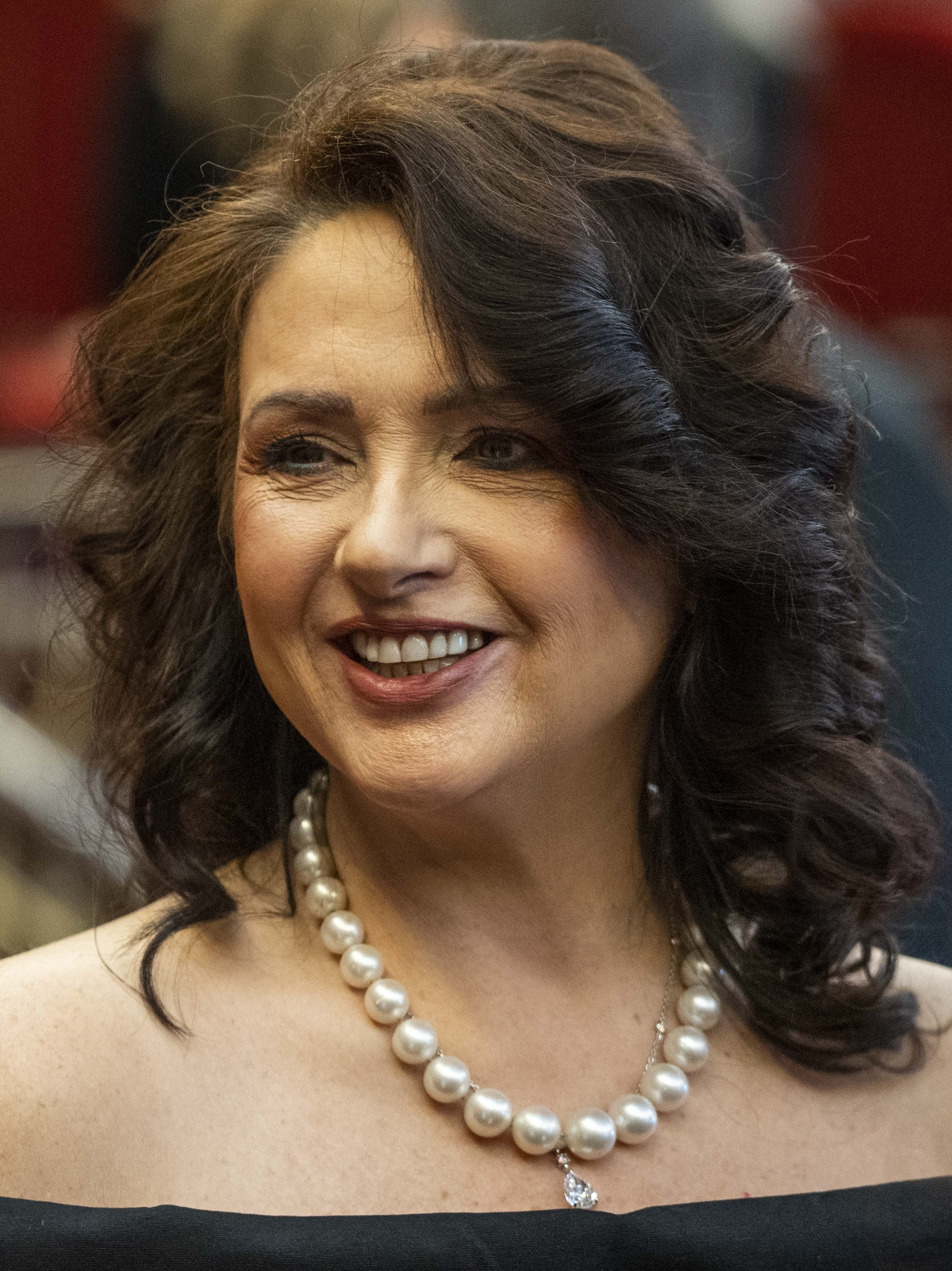
- Dalli in 2023

Acting President of the Republic of Malta
- Incumbent
- Assumed office 23 July 2025
- President: Myriam Spiteri Debono
- Prime Minister: Robert Abela
- Preceded by: Francis Zammit Dimech

European Commissioner for Equality
- In office 1 December 2019 – 30 November 2024
- Commission: Von der Leyen I
- Preceded by: Věra Jourová (Justice and Consumers)
- Succeeded by: Hadja Lahbib

Minister for European Affairs and Equality
- In office 9 June 2017 – 24 July 2019
- Prime Minister: Joseph Muscat
- Preceded by: Louis Grech
- Succeeded by: Edward Zammit Lewis

Minister for Social Dialogue, Consumer Affairs and Civil Liberties
- In office 13 March 2013 – 5 June 2017
- Prime Minister: Joseph Muscat
- Preceded by: Position established

Personal details
- Born: Helena Abela; 29 September 1962 (age 63) Żabbar, Malta
- Party: Labour Party
- Other political affiliations: Party of European Socialists
- Education: University of Nottingham; University of Malta

Helena Dalli (née Abela; born 29 September 1962) is a Maltese politician who served as European Commissioner for Equality from 1 December 2019 to 30 November 2024. She is a member of the Labour Party.

== Career ==
=== Before politics ===
Before entering politics, Dalli worked as a model and actress. At 17, Dalli won Miss Malta, and represented the country at Miss World 1979. She subsequently appeared in the 1985 movie Final Justice as a policewoman who partners with the protagonist. After the failure of the film, she left acting and entered politics, working with Labour Party leader Dom Mintoff.

=== Parliamentary Secretary ===
In 1996, Dalli was elected to the Parliament of Malta and appointed Parliamentary Secretary for Women's Rights in the Office of the Prime Minister. She was re-elected during the five subsequent elections, making her the second most elected woman in Maltese political history.

During her two-year tenure, she put forwards a Childcare Bill to provide for regulations of childcare services both in the public and the private sector, and took care of the drafting of the Gender Equality Bill with the assistance of the United Nations Development Programme. Dalli also launched Malta's first white paper on domestic violence.

=== Minister ===
During the 2013–2017 legislature, Dr Dalli was Minister for Social Dialogue, Consumer Affairs and Civil Liberties. Under her direction, the Maltese Government introduced several laws and policies to strengthen the equality and human rights framework, including a Civil Unions Act as well as the widening of the anti-discrimination protections in the Maltese constitution to cover the grounds of gender identity and sexual orientation.

In April 2015, she presented a law establishing wide-ranging rights for transgender and intersex people. The Gender Identity Gender Expression and Sex Characteristics Act provides for a right to gender identity and the recognition of one's self-determined gender on official documents, and recognises a right to bodily integrity and physical autonomy.

During the same legislature, Dalli introduced a national maternity leave fund to which all employers contribute regardless of the gender of their employees, in order to protect women against discrimination during the recruitment process.

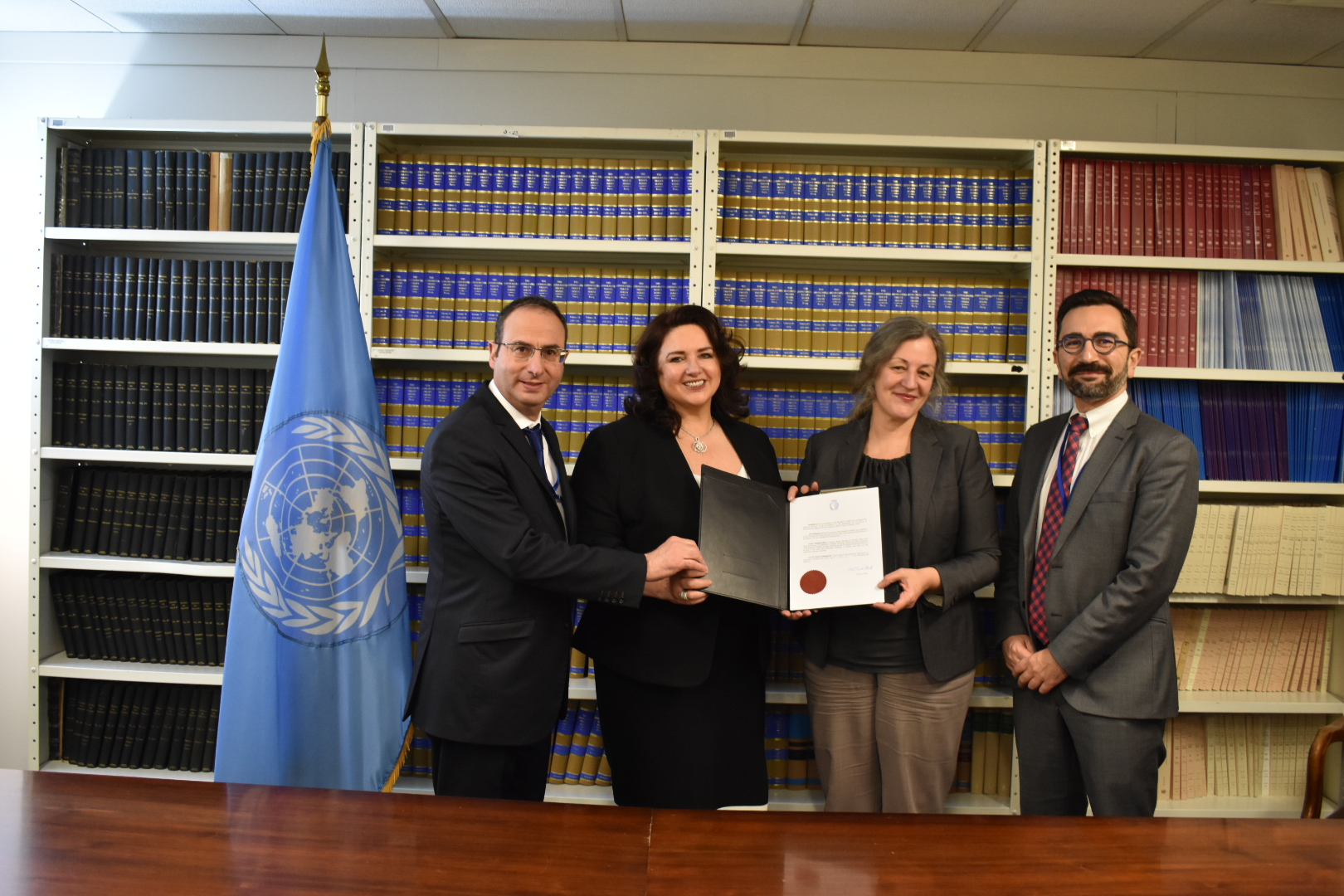
Dalli submitting Malta's instrument of accession to OP-CEDAW at the UN Headquarters in March 2019

In 2015, Helena Dalli led the process for the establishment of the International Day of Women and Girls in Science, which the UN now commemorates annually on 11 February. Dalli was also instrumental for the restructuring of the Malta Medicines Authority.

Dalli was re-elected from two districts in the 2017 general election. At the start of the new session, she presented to Parliament a Bill to introduce marriage equality (same-sex marriage). Dalli's work in the equality sector led Malta to become the country affording the best legal protection and equality for LGBTIQ people. As a result, Malta has retained the top spot of the ILGA-Europe country index for four consecutive years.

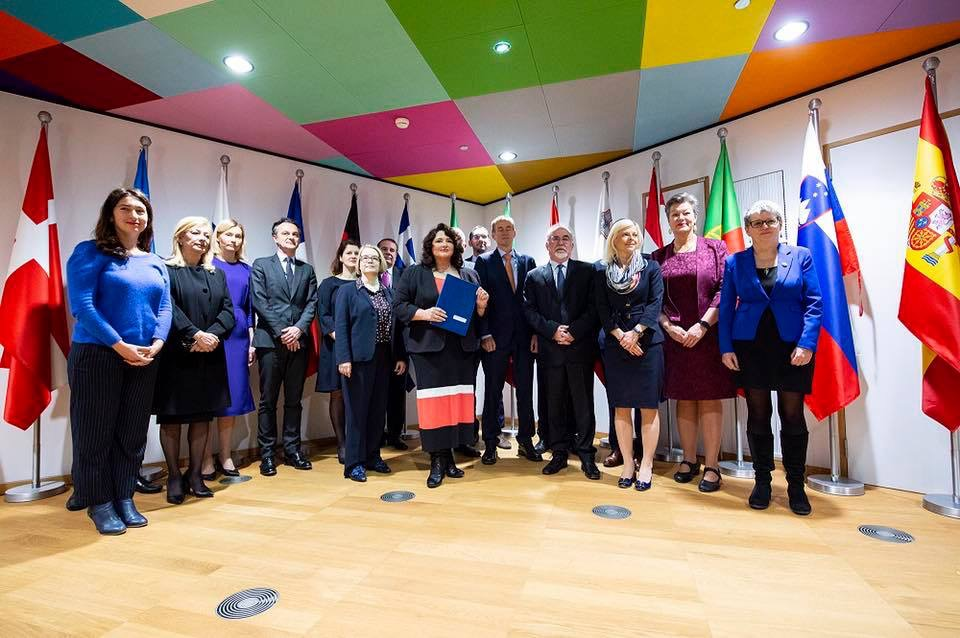
Call for a European Commission follow-up to the LGBTI List of Actions (December 2018)

During both terms as a Minister, Dalli worked to enhance Malta's human rights and equality structures and their independence, as well as dialogue with civil society and social partners. In view of this, she set up a Human Rights and Equality Directorate that is responsible for Government policy on gender equality and gender mainstreaming, LGBTIQ equality, and migrant integration and anti-racism. She also set up an LGBTIQ Consultative Council, a Consultative Council for Women's Rights and a Forum on Integration Affairs. Following a long and multi-step consultation process, she presented an Equality Bill and a Human Rights and Equality Commission Bill that aim to instil the highest standards in terms of anti-discrimination and equality in all spheres of life, and the setting up of an independent national human rights institution in line with the Paris Principles of the United Nations and European Union equality directives.

Following the 2019 European elections, Dalli was nominated by the government of Prime Minister Muscat as Malta's candidate for the subsequent European Commission.

=== Commissioner ===
In 2019, Dalli was made the European Commissioner for Equality in the von der Leyen Commission. Her Portfolio included leading on EU implementation of the UN Convention on the Rights of Persons with Disabilities, developing a European 'gender strategy' to further improve women's rights by improving pay transparency and ensuring implementation of the Women on Boards Directive, ensuring implementation of the Work-Life Balance Directive, exploring the addition of 'violence against women' to the list of EU crimes and supporting EU accession to the Istanbul Convention.

In November 2021, Dalli launched internal EU guidelines for inclusive language, including saying "holiday season" instead of Christmas, avoiding gendered phrases such as "ladies and gentlemen" (eg "Dear All"), and to use names such as "Malika and Julio" for fictional people rather than "Maria and John". The guidelines were criticised by politicians including Antonio Tajani of Forza Italia and former Democratic Party Prime Minister of Italy Matteo Renzi, and were eventually withdrawn. Pope Francis compared the measures to anti-Christian dictatorships in revolutionary France, Nazi Germany and the communist world.

In the same month, French ministers Marlène Schiappa and Clément Beaune criticised Dalli for meeting representatives of FEMYSO France considers to be linked to the Muslim Brotherhood.

=== Academia ===
Dalli holds a PhD in Political Sociology from the University of Nottingham, and lectures in Economic and Political Sociology, Public Policy, and Sociology of Law at the University of Malta.

== Recognition ==
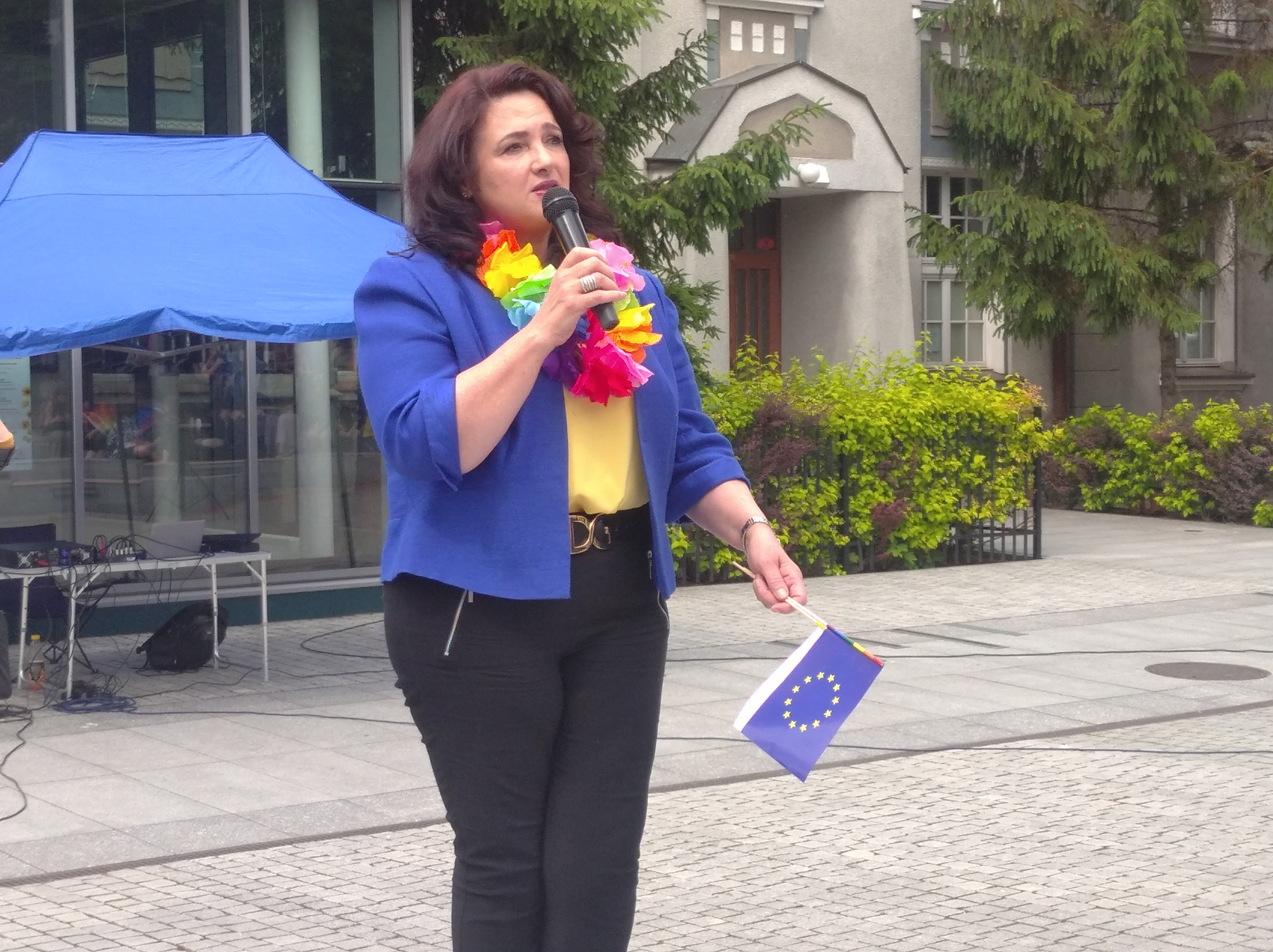
Helena Dalli in Zielona Góra, 2022.

In 2016, Dalli was the first Maltese nominee and winner of the European Diversity Award for her work in human rights and equality at the local and international level.

In 2019, Dalli was presented, on behalf of Malta, with the Diversa Internacional award by the Spanish Association of Lawyers and Lawyers against Hate Crimes, in recognition of her work for equality on both the domestic and international fronts.

In 2021, Dalli was presented an award by the Spanish Government in recognition of the robustness of the EU LGBTIQ Equality Strategy 2020–2025. Months later, she received an award on behalf of the European Commission from PROUD, an organisation working for LGBTIQ equality in Czechia, for the same strategy.

== Literature ==
- Uwe Jens Rudolf: Historical Dictionary of Malta, 3rd edition, Rowman & Littlefield 2018, ISBN 978-1-5381-1917-4, page 75 (Online)

== Notes ==
Political offices
Preceded by Karmenu Vella	Maltese European Commissioner; 2019–	Incumbent
