= Frederick Azzopardi =

Maltese politician (1949–2020)

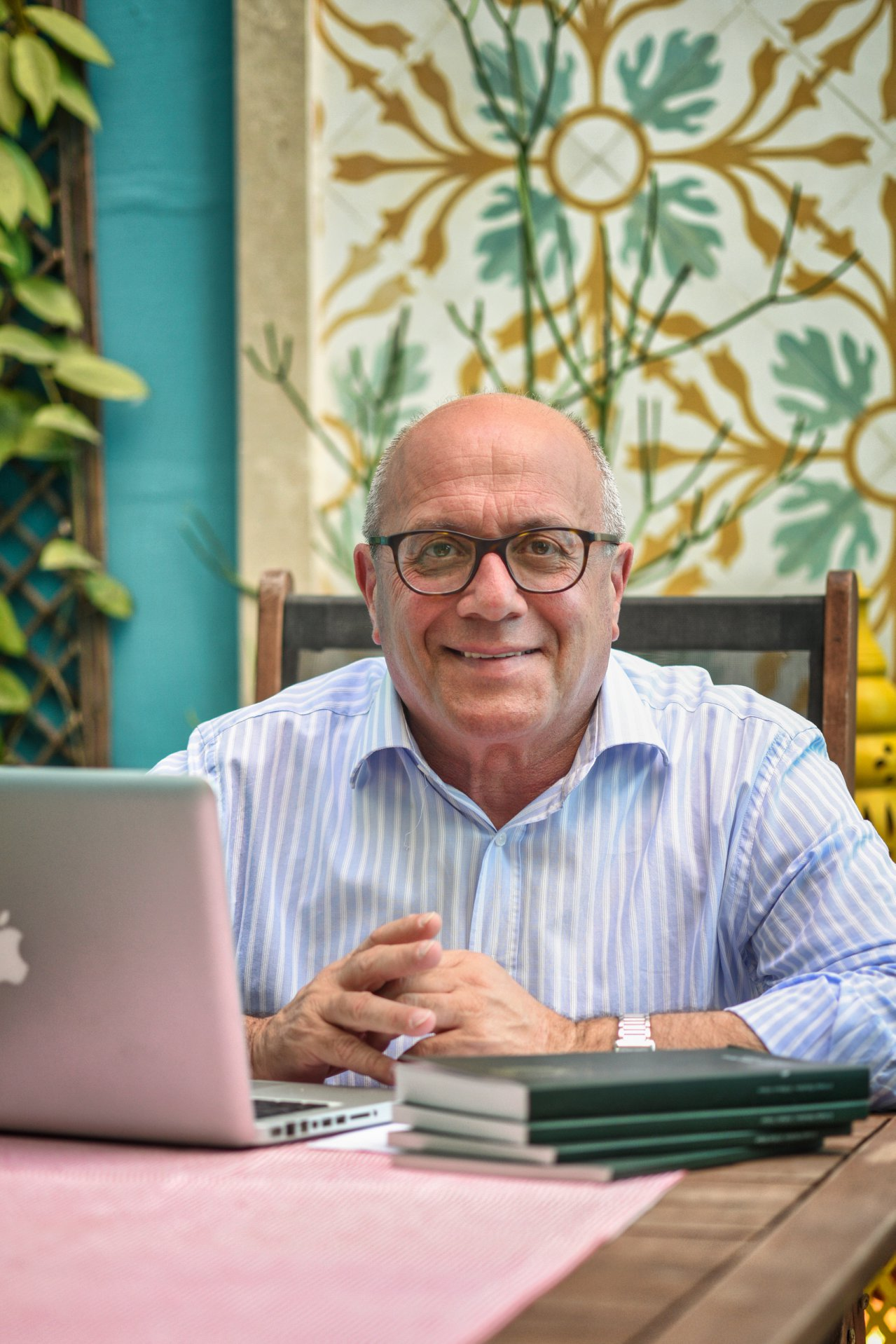
Azzopardi in 2017

Frederick Azzopardi (15 September 1949 – 17 October 2020) was a Maltese politician who served as Member of Parliament, Government Deputy Whip, and Parliamentary Assistant in the Ministry of Gozo within the Maltese Government.

Azzopardi started working in public service in 1969, and his political career began in 1997 when he was elected as the Deputy Mayor for Victoria, Gozo's capital. He was elected in the House of Representatives of Malta in the general election of 1998, and he was re-elected in the elections of 2003, 2008, 2013 and 2017. He was a member of the House Business Committee and of the Standing Committee on Social Affairs, and he also formed part of the Maltese delegations to the PAM and the OSCE PA. His political focus with the House of Representatives of Malta, PAM and OSCE was centred around good governance and international peace.

Azzopardi was married and he had three children. He was the father of couture designer Luke Azzopardi.

Azzopardi died on 17 October 2020, at the age of 71 from a brain tumour.
