= Justyne Caruana =

Maltese lawyer and politician

- Caruana in 2018

Minister of Education
- In office 23 November 2020 – 22 December 2021
- Prime Minister: Robert Abela
- Preceded by: Owen Bonnici
- Succeeded by: Clifton Grima

Minister for Gozo
- In office 9 June 2017 – 20 January 2020
- Prime Minister: Joseph Muscat; Robert Abela
- Preceded by: Anton Refalo
- Succeeded by: Clint Camilleri

Personal details
- Party: Labour
- Profession: Lawyer

Justyne Caruana is a Maltese lawyer and politician who served as the Minister for Gozo from 2017 to 2020 and Minister for Education from 2020 to 2021. She was appointed on 9 June 2017 in the second cabinet of Joseph Muscat and reconfirmed by new Prime Minister Robert Abela before resigning one week later on 20 January 2020 and replaced with Clint Camilleri. After 11 months, she was re-appointed to Cabinet on 23 November 2020 as the new Minister for Education by Abela. She resigned as Minister for Education on 22 December 2021.

== Political career ==
She was first elected to Parliament in 2003 and successively in 2008, 2013 and 2017, always from her native Gozo constituency. She served as the Parliamentary Secretary for Rights of Persons with Disability and Active Ageing from 2014 to 2017. In Opposition she was Spokesperson for Youth, Culture, Sports, Family, Children and Persons with Disability. Caruana was regional representative of the UK, British Isles and Mediterranean Region on the Steering Committee of the Commonwealth Women Parliamentarians and currently represents Malta on its Regional British Isles and Mediterranean Steering Committee. In 2016, Caruana was nominated as Malta's ambassador in the Women in Parliaments Global Forum. She is a member of the Social Affairs Committee.

A Lawyer by profession, Caruana specialized in family law and canonical and civil litigation.

== Controversies ==
On the December 7, 2021 a 89 page ethics report compiled by the Standards Commissioner was released to the general public. It found that Caruana released a €15,000 contract to her friend Daniel Bogdanović to draft a report on ways to improve the National Sport School. The report also found that there was a "concentrated effort to hide Bogdanović's incompetence" and the work delivered was actually done by Paul Debattista, one of Caruana's consultants. The Maltese Prime Minister Robert Abela stopped the Bogdanović contract as soon as he became aware of it.

It was alleged that Caruana shared a romantic relationship with Bogdanović. Caruana did not reply to questions by media.

Caruana resigned from her position as Minister for Education on December 22, 2021. She was succeeded by Clifton Grima.

Within the second week following resignation, Caruana was employed full-time in the Victims Support Agency at the Ministry of Home Affairs on a salary of €40,000, alongside a termination-benefit payment of €30,000, by the disgraced former prime minister Joseph Muscat. The Maltese Government and Caruana refused to comment on how she was visibly seen continuing her private law practise employment whilst simultaneously working full-time at the Ministry of Home Affairs. Additionally, as of July 2024, Caruana was once again brought into the Government's payroll, acting as an advisor on tax and customs to the government whilst receiving a salary of €78,000. As stated by the Maltese Nationalist Party; "It’s unclear where she works, what she does, or whether she even attends work anywhere. It’s also unknown on what criteria she was selected over others".
