= Joe Debono Grech =

Maltese politician (born 1939)

Member of Parliament
- In office 1966 – 03 June 2017

Deputy Leader of the Labour Party Affairs
- In office 1987–1992
- Succeeded by: George Abela

Personal details
- Born: September 17, 1939 (age 86) Malta
- Party: Labour (PL)
- Spouse: Edith nee’ Vella
- Children: Joanne; Saviour
- Profession: Member of Parliament

Joe Debono Grech (born 17 September 1939) is a retired Maltese politician. He was a Member of Parliament in the House of Representatives of Malta.

== Political life ==
Joseph Debono Grech started off in the Labour Party in 1959 both as a Secretary and also as a president of several branches of the party. In 1959 he was one of the founders of the ‘Brigata Laburista’. In 1967 he was appointed secretary of the Labour Youths and the representative in the bureau of I.U.S.Y. for the same committee. In 1969 he was elected Deputy Leader for party affairs. He contested the general elections for the first time in 1966 on the 13th and 8th district. He was elected in the Maltese Parliament in 1966 and in all subsequent elections until 2013.

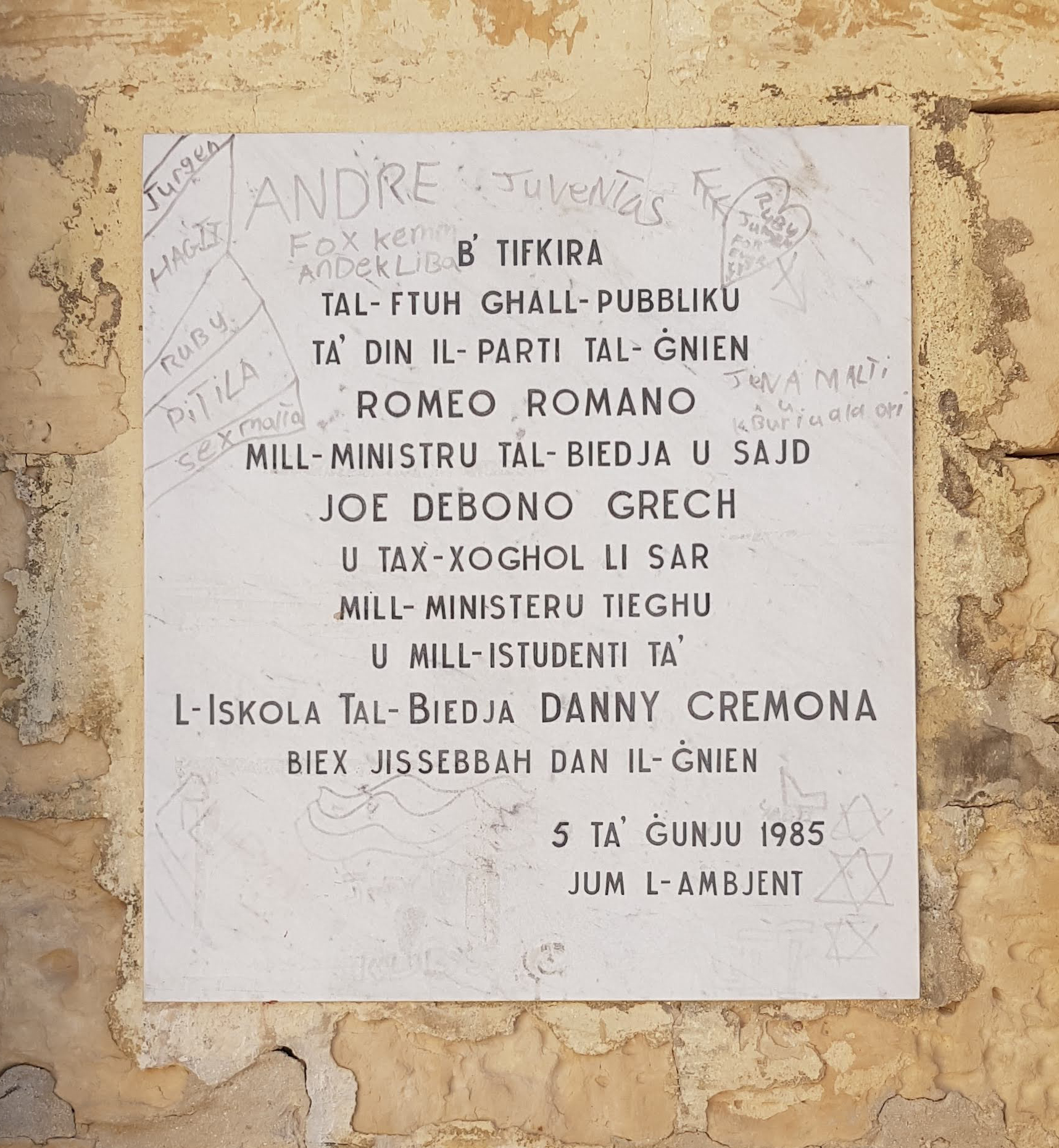
Plaque at Romeo Romano Gardens making reference to Debono Grech as Minister of Fisheries and Agriculture

In 1983 he was appointed Minister of Parastatal and People's Investments and later held the Agriculture and Fisheries portfolio for four years until 1987. When Labour was reelected in 1996 he served as minister of Transport and Ports. From 2003 till 2008 he was the shadow minister for the Malta International Airport and the country's security. He also worked in the General Workers Union as a Secretary for the Petrol, Chemical and General workers. Today he is a Labour MP on the government side.

For many years he represented the Union in Gozo. He was a representative of the Labour Party in the Council of Europe and also a member of the Socialist Bureau in the Council of Europe, since 1998. He has been a member of the National Executive committee of the party since 1960.
