= Michael Falzon (politician, born 1961) =

Maltese politician

The Honourable Michael Falzon MP
- Falzon in 2017

Minister for Social Policy and the Family
- Incumbent
- Assumed office 4 June 2026
- Prime Minister: Robert Abela
- Preceded by: Himself (as Minister for Social Policy and Children's Rights)

Minister for Social Policy and Children's Rights
- In office 30 March 2022 – 4 June 2026
- Prime Minister: Robert Abela
- Preceded by: Himself (as Minister for Social Justice and Solidarity, the Family and Children's Rights)
- Succeeded by: Himself (as Minister for Social Policy and the Family)

Minister for Social Justice and Solidarity, the Family and Children's Rights
- In office 23 November 2020 – 20 February 2022
- Prime Minister: Robert Abela
- Preceded by: Himself (as Minister for the Family, Children's Rights and Social Solidarity)
- Succeeded by: Himself (as Minister for Social Policy and Children's Rights)

Minister for the Family, Children's Rights and Social Solidarity
- In office 9 June 2017 – 23 November 2020
- Prime Minister: Joseph Muscat; Robert Abela
- Succeeded by: Himself (as Minister for Social Justice and Solidarity, the Family and Children's Rights)

Parliamentary Secretary for Planning and Simplification of Administrative Processes
- In office 2 April 2014 – 1 May 2017
- Prime Minister: Joseph Muscat
- Succeeded by: Himself (as Minister for the Family, Children's Rights and Social Solidarity)

Member of Parliament
- Incumbent
- Assumed office 9 March 2008
- Constituency: 9th and 10th electoral divisions

Deputy Leader of the Labour Party Party Affairs
- In office 2003 – 13 June 2008
- Preceded by: Joseph Brincat
- Succeeded by: Toni Abela

Personal details
- Born: 16 November 1961 (age 64) Sliema, Colony of Malta
- Party: Labour Party
- Spouse: Anna née Lia
- Children: Martina, Nathaniel
- Website: [www.falzonmichael.com(http://www.falzonmichael.com)]

Michael Falzon (born 16 November 1961) is a Maltese politician Labour Party (PL) who has served as a Member of Parliament. He stood as a candidate for the second (Vittoriosa, Senglea, Cospicua, Żabbar, Kalkara and Xgħajra) and tenth electoral (Gżira, Pembroke, Sliema and St. Julian's) divisions of Malta for the PL. He was elected from both districts.

== Family ==
Falzon was the son of Mosè Falzon, and Carmela Falzon, née Said, from Gozo. Mosè owned a grocery store just down the road from the family home in Amery Street, Sliema, where Falzon would stay with him sometimes.

He was married to Anna née Lia and had two children: Martina and Nathaniel.

== Education and work ==
Falzon was educated at St Albert the Great College in Sliema and Valletta. He then proceeded to do his sixth form studies and joined the Bank of Valletta in 1979 as a clerk. In 1985, the Bank sponsored Michael to start reading law at the University of Malta from where he graduated as a notary in 1989 and as a lawyer in 1991. Falzon also continued with his banking studies obtaining also the International qualification as an Associate of the Chartered Institute of Bankers, ACIB.

Falzon is employed at the Bank of Valletta as an Executive Head within the Bank's Legal Office.

- 1991: Doctor of Laws, University of Malta
- Associate of Chartered Institute of Bankers (UK)

== Political career ==
- Responsibilities within the Malta Labour Party:
  - Member of the Maltese Parliament (2008– 2025 )
  - Deputy Leader Party Affairs (2003–2008)
  - International Secretary (1998–2003)
  - Election Manager (1993–2003)

Falzon was a general election candidate during the March 2008 general election where he gained 3,047 first preference votes in the Second District and 2,853 on the Tenth District. He was also Deputy Leader for Party Affairs from May 2003 to June 2008.

Before this, however, Falzon had served as the Election Manager of the Malta Labour Party's Electoral Office since 1992. There he had gathered around him and led a team of dedicated persons who ensured that Labour was both professionally organised and better than the Nationalist Party in ensuring, that the electoral process during election time is fair, transparent and smooth. This professionalism had earned Michael Falzon the respect of everyone nationwide, not only within the Labour camp, but also from the Nationalist Party and the Electoral Commission of Malta.

Falzon also served as the Labour Party's International Secretary between 1998 and 2003. In this capacity he improved Labour's contacts with sister parties in Europe and the Mediterranean Region. Dr Falzon's international work culminated in meetings with world leaders such as the UK's Tony Blair, Italy's Massimo D'Alema, Martin Schulz, the President of the Party of European Socialists within the European Parliament and Australian Labor Leader, and eventually Prime Minister, Kevin Rudd.

Further to the Labour Party win in 2013, Falzon was appointed as Parliamentary Secretary for Planning and Simplification of Administrative Processes. He resigned from his post on 20 January 2016 after a corruption scandal, known as the Gaffarena scandal, involving the Lands Department which fell under his remit. Falzon was forced to resign after a report by the National Audit Office (NAO) concluded there was collusion between government officials in the Lands Department and Gaffarena. After the snap election held in 2017, he was appointed as Minister for Family, Children's Rights and Social Solidarity. On 27 March 2018, the Civil Courts in Malta rescinded the part-exchange deal and revoked all transfers made in two expropriation contracts relating to the Gaffarena scandal.

== Other interests ==
Michael Falzon is an enthusiast of the traditional aspects of the Maltese festa. He was also the President of his local band club, Stella Maris in Sliema. He takes interest in anything relating to Maltese identity.
