= Anton Refalo =

Maltese politician (born 1956)

- Refalo in 2025
- Born: 1956 (age 69–70); Gozo
- Citizenship: Malta
- Occupation: politician
- Children: 2

Anton Refalo (born 1956) is a Maltese politician from the Labour Party. He was first elected to the Parliament of Malta in the 1987 Maltese general election from District 13. He has held a number of roles in the Maltese Government, including Minister for Gozo Affairs and Agriculture minister. He has two children.

== See also ==
- List of members of the parliament of Malta, 2008–2013
- List of members of the parliament of Malta, 2013–2017
- List of members of the parliament of Malta, 2022–2027
