= Roderick Galdes =

Maltese politician

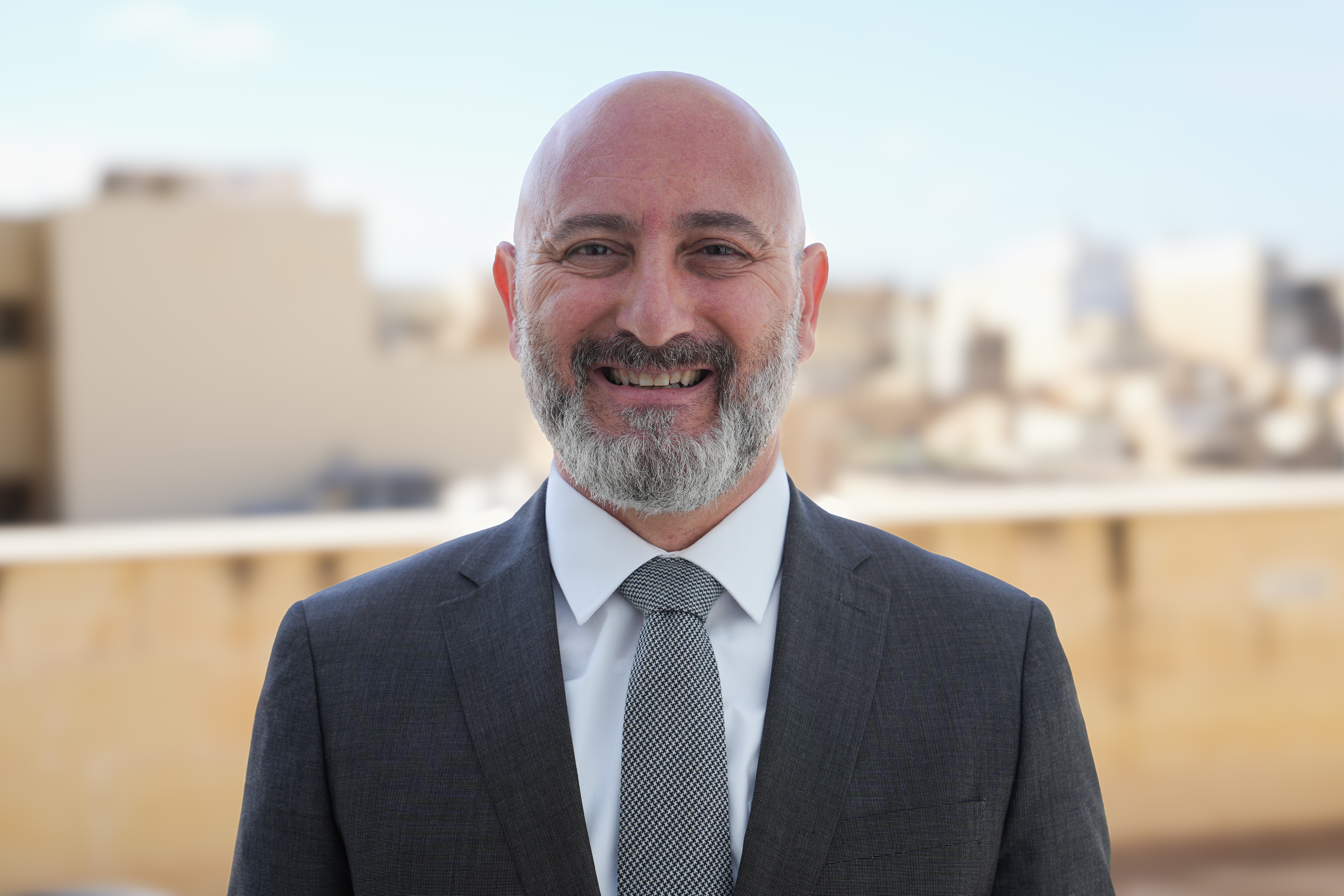
Galdes in 2025

Roderick Galdes is a Maltese politician elected in the Maltese Parliament, on behalf of the Labour Party, since 2004. He was a member of the Cabinet of Ministers serving as Minister for Social and Affordable Accommodation. He resigned on 24 January 2026

He previously served as junior Minister for Agriculture, Fisheries & Animal Rights.

He was first elected to Parliament in 2004, and re-elected in the 2008, 2013 and 2017 elections from the sixth district which comprises his hometown, Qormi, together with Luqa and Siggiewi.

== Initial years: Qormi Local Council ==
Galdes was active in the Labour Party from a young age, forming part of Labour's Youth Forum National Executive together with Joseph Muscat, who years later became Party Leader and Prime Minister of Malta.

In 1994, Galdes successfully contested the first local council elections in Qormi, becoming the youngest councillor at the time. In 2001, he became the first Labour mayor of the locality. In 2004 Galdes was re-elected with the highest number of votes polled by a Labour Party candidate nationwide in the 2004 Local Council elections, garnering 3,513 first-count votes. Thanks to this performance, Labour won a seat from the Nationalist Party.

During his tenure as Qormi Mayor (2001–2004), Galdes is best remembered for the vast infrastructural projects undertaken throughout the locality, including resurfacing of the road network.

== Member of Parliament ==
=== 2004 general election ===
At the age of 29, Galdes became a Member of Parliament, replacing long-serving MP John Attard Montalto who was elected to serve as an MEP in Brussels. Upon taking the oath of office, then Labour leader Alfred Sant gave Galdes the responsibility to shadow the Environment and National Heritage ministry.

=== 2008 general election ===
Galdes successfully contested the 2008 general elections garnering 1,634 first count votes, reported by the Times of Malta as "a massive increase on the 359 votes of five years ago, when he was elected for the first time." For the 2008-2013 legislature, he was appointed Shadow Minister for Planning, Housing, Urban Development and Construction in 2008. He was also the official Labour Representative on the Malta Environment and Planning Authority board.

=== 2013 general election ===
Roderick Galdes continued to establish himself as a Labour figure in the sixth district in the 2013 general election when he increased his tally vote to more than 2,000 first count votes. Consequently, Prime Minister Joseph Muscat appointed him as Parliamentary Secretary for Agriculture, Fisheries and Animal Rights under the Ministry of Environment.

=== 2017 general election ===
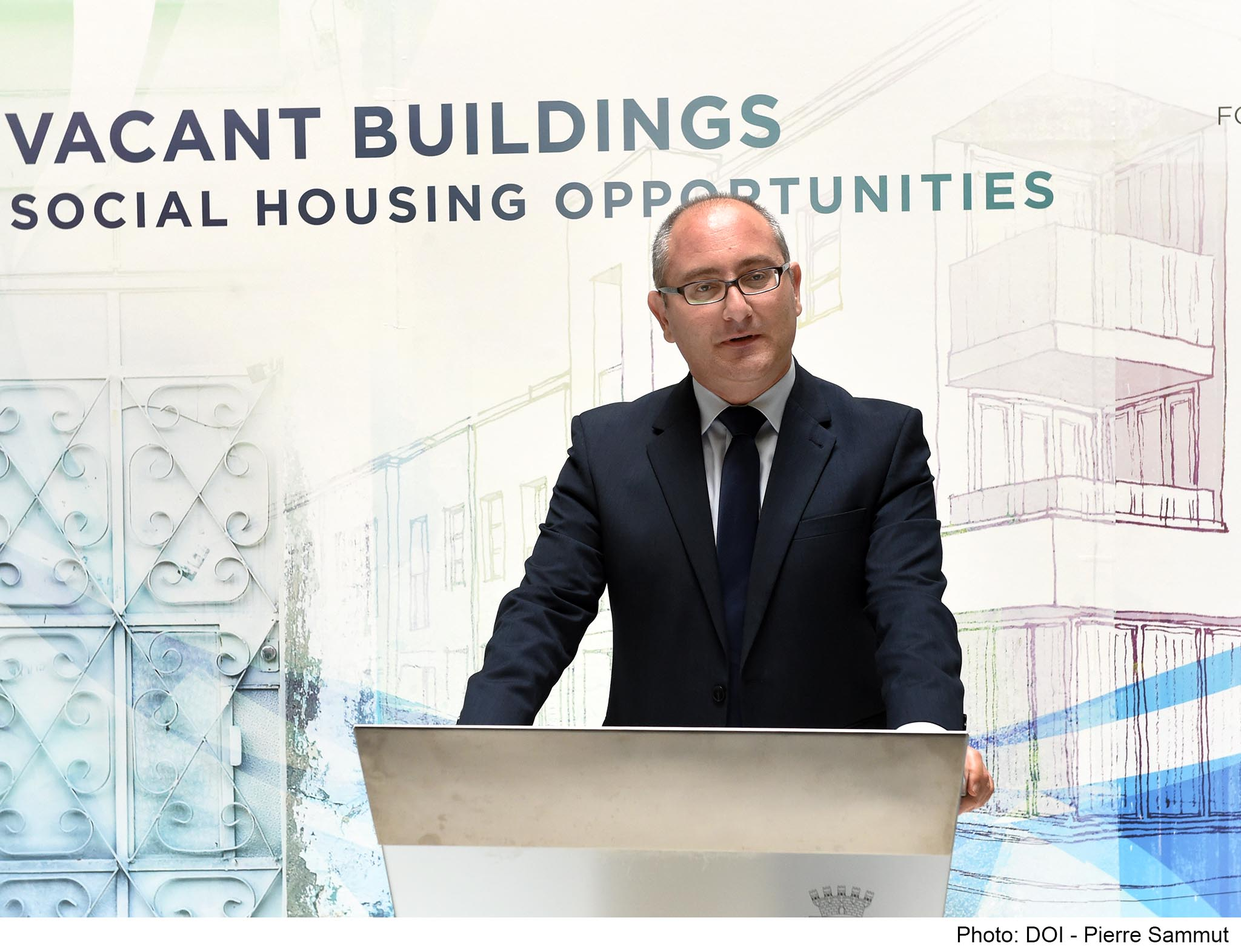
Parliamentary Secretary for Social Accommodation Roderick Galdes

On 1 May, Prime Minister Muscat called a snap election for the following 3 June. In this election, Roderick Galdes contested the sixth district, comprising Qormi, Luqa and Siggiewi. He was elected for the fourth consecutive time, with 2,757 first count votes. This also meant an increase of more than 700 votes when compared to the previous election.

Prime Minister Muscat entrusted him with the portfolio of Social Accommodation, which Muscat had earlier described as "one of the most important priorities in the upcoming legislature".

=== 2022 general election ===
For the 2022 general election, Roderick Galdes contested the sixth and eighth district and garnered 4,035 first-count votes on the sixth district. This was an increase in votes of nearly 1,280 when compared to the 2017 general election. Following this election, the portfolio was widened to also include affordable accommodation.

== Reforms in Agriculture, Fisheries & Animal Welfare (2013–2017) ==
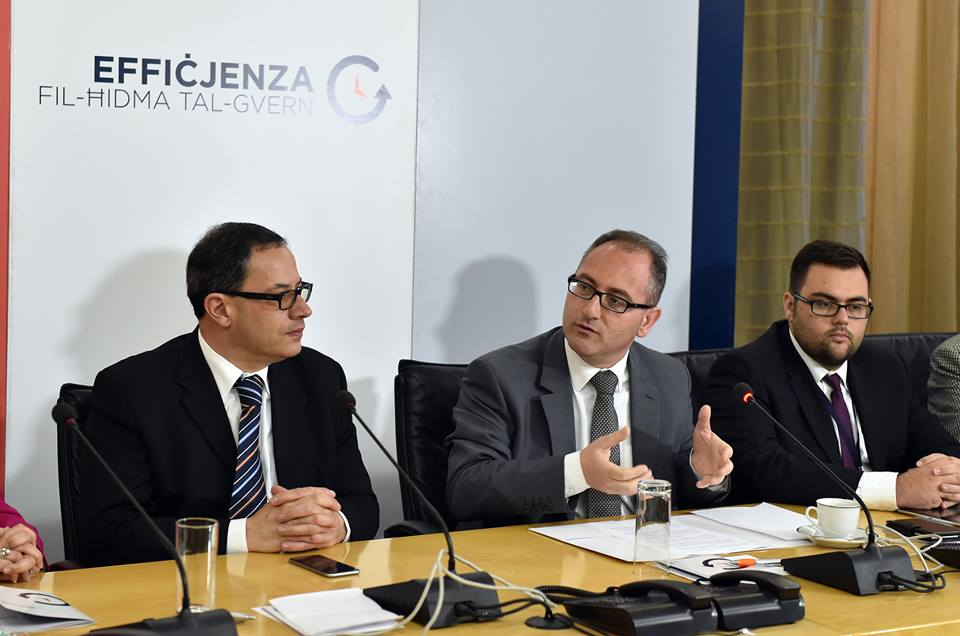
Roderick Galdes, 2016

As the first Labour politician responsible for Agriculture in 15 years, Galdes set out to modernise the sector with today's reality. Under his watch, a new fish market was completed in line with the highest EU standards, replacing the old fisheries building which was built in 1911. Ports and facilities used by fishermen were also upgraded through an investment of more than €5.5 million. This included a 90-year old wharf at Tal-Veċċja in St Paul's Bay, after it was left deteriorating with no suitable maintenance for years.

Galdes also managed to overturn Malta's abattoir fortunes. While in 2013 the abattoir was on the verge of closing, due to EU Commission's infringement procedures related to bad practices and infrastructural deficiencies, in 2016 it was cleared by the European Commission following a reform overseen by Galdes.

Under Galdes, Malta enacted its first National Agricultural Policy, inaugurated a new botanic garden Ġnien il-Pjanti Maltin to safeguard and conserve Maltese trees and plants, launched the first Animal Welfare Fund to assist NGOs and sanctuaries and initiated upgrades at the Pitkalija market. A new animal hospital was also inaugurated offering services and operations for the first time in Malta.

== Social Housing & Rent reform (2017–present) ==
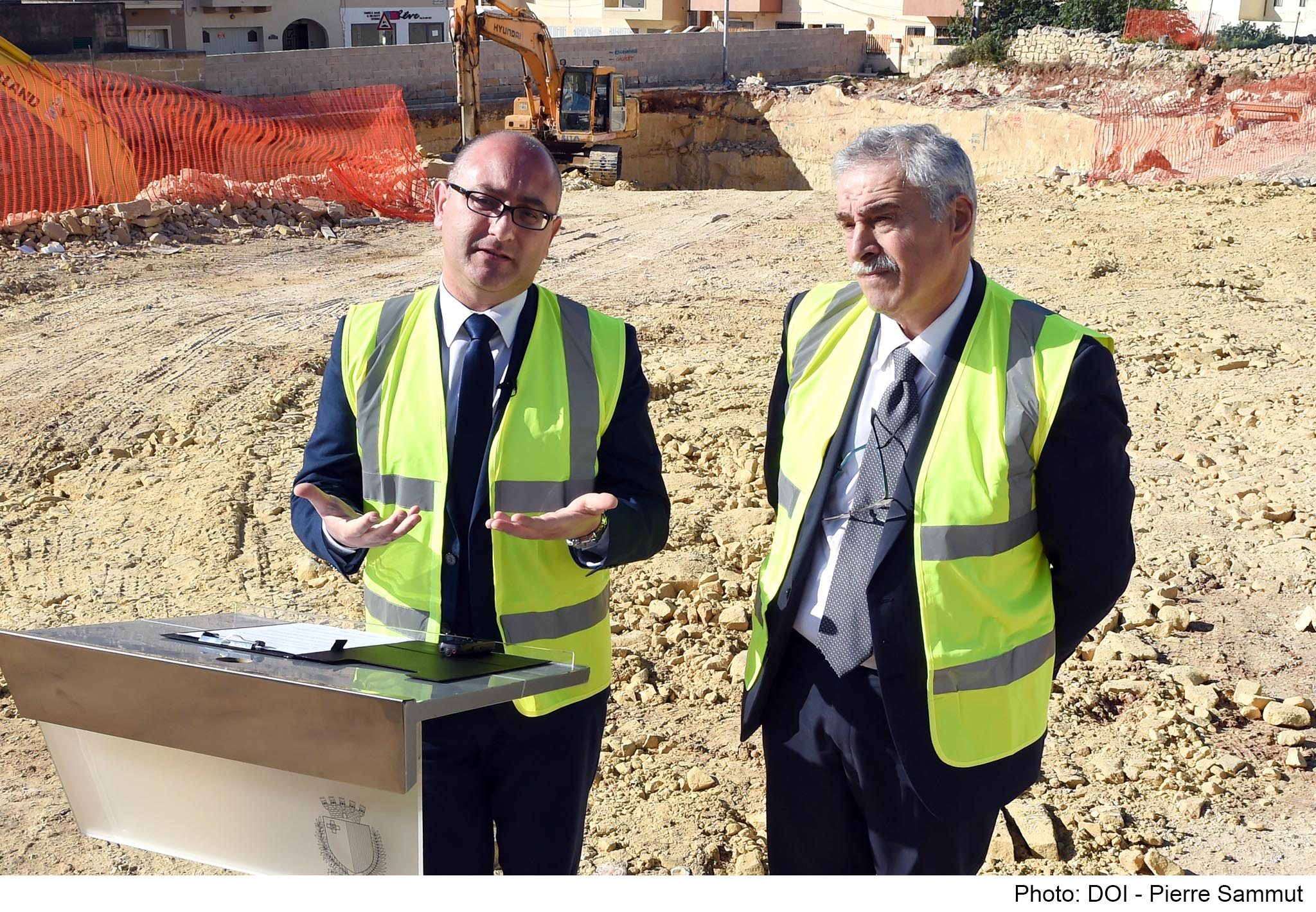
Malta Parliamentary Secretary for Social Accommodation Roderick Galdes

Taking office as junior Minister for Social Housing, Galdes immediately launched a number of initiatives related to the sector. These included a rental scheme of private properties 'Nikru biex Nassistu', a regeneration scheme of vacant properties, the launching of an affordable loan scheme for low-income earners, and an anti-housing fraud freephone.

An ongoing project is the building of 680 housing units, in 16 sites, earmarked for affordable accommodation.

On 15 October 2018, Galdes published a detailed White Paper on rent reform, encouraging longer leases, regulating rental increases, without imposing any fixed prices. The proposed rent reform was lauded by Employers, a coalition of 20 Social NGOs, Caritas Malta, Developers, Architects, Trade-Unions, and CEOs of Gaming companies among others. Maltese Prime Minister Joseph Muscat said the rent reform piloted by Roderick Galdes 'aimed to protect the most vulnerable while allowing the market to operate as freely as possible'.

Roderick Galdes was appointed as Minister for Social Accommodation on 15 January 2020 after the appointment of Dr. Robert Abela as Malta's new Prime Minister. Galdes continued on the work that he started as Parliamentary Secretary for Social Accommodation. He also embarked on several new initiatives to continue lowering the housing waiting list. Galdes oversaw the launching the Housing Development Fund, a fund that administers funds received from public and private entities, and invests them in innovative, holistic initiatives and programmes that strengthen the safety net provided by social accommodation in Malta. Recently, Galdes also launched the Affordable Housing Foundation, which is a partnership between the government and church, and aims to help people who do not qualify for social housing.

Following the 2022 general election, the portfolio was widened to include affordable housing alongside social housing. The Minister went on to give rise to significant social housing projects and kickstart a reform of the contentious rent law. The year 2024 is said to be the 'record year' for inaugurations of social housing projects in Malta as well as various schemes aimed to assist persons in purchasing their own property.

== Education and family ==
Roderick Galdes holds a master's degree in Small Islands States from the University of Malta, a bachelor's degree in Urban Planning from the same university, and a Diploma in Planning Studies.

He is married to Joanne Galdes (née Carabott), and is a father of three: Daniel, Andrew, and Nathan.
