= Owen Bonnici =

Maltese politician (born 1980)

The Honourable Owen Bonnici MP
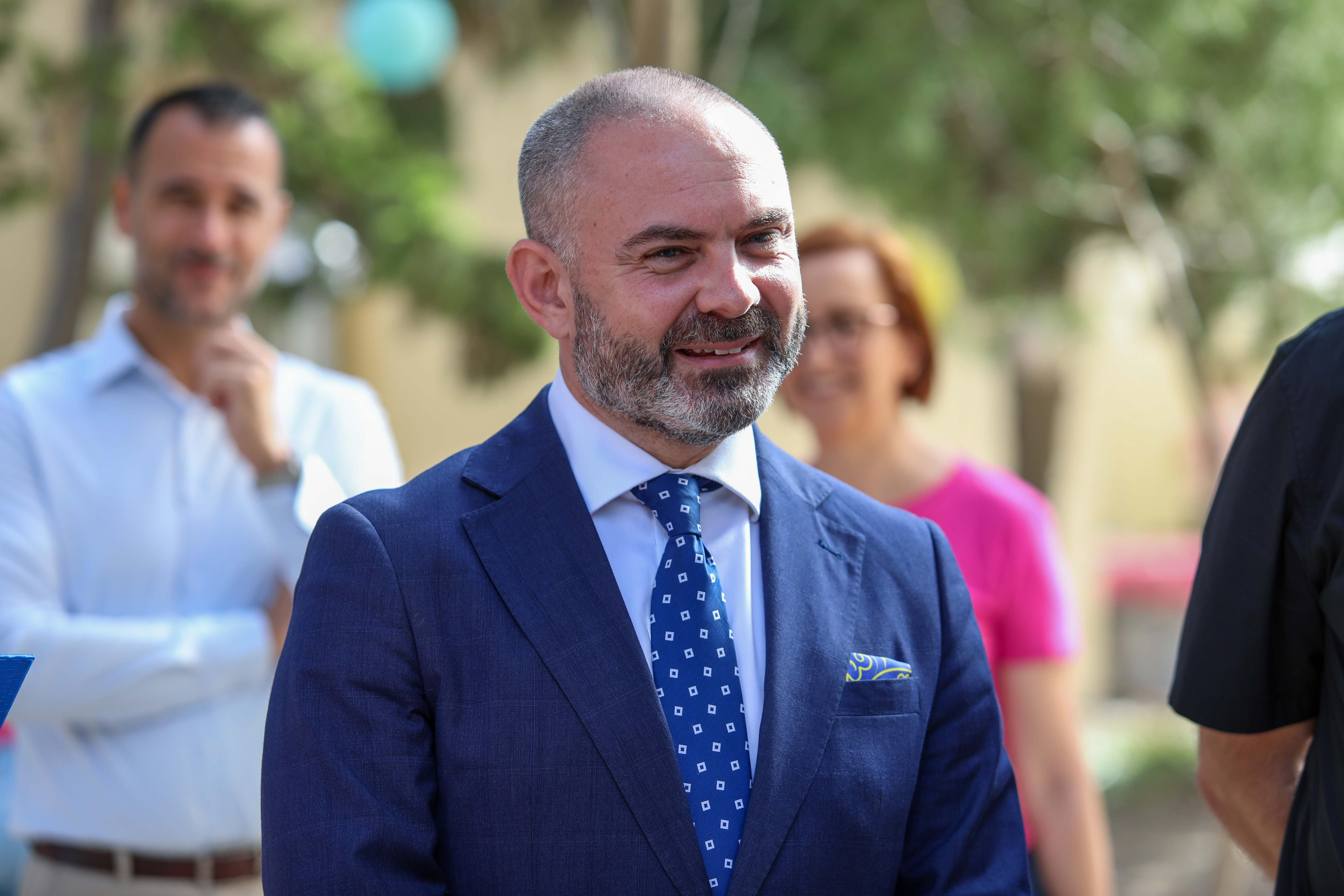
- Bonnici in 2025

Minister for Accommodation and Lands
- Incumbent
- Assumed office 04 June 2026
- Prime Minister: Robert Abela

Minister for Culture, Lands and Local Government
- In office 30 March 2022 – 30 May 2026
- Prime Minister: Robert Abela

Acting Prime Minister of Malta
- In office 19 September 2022 – 25 September 2022
- Prime Minister: Robert Abela

Ministry for Research, Innovation and the Coordination of the Post-COVID-19 Strategy
- In office 23 November 2020 – 26 March 2022
- Prime Minister: Robert Abela

Minister for Education & Employment
- In office 15 January 2020 – 23 November 2020
- Prime Minister: Robert Abela
- Preceded by: Evarist Bartolo
- Succeeded by: Justyne Caruana

Minister for Justice, Culture and Local Government
- In office 29 March 2014 – 13 January 2020
- Prime Minister: Joseph Muscat
- Preceded by: Chris Said; Responsible for Justice
- Succeeded by: Edward Zammit Lewis; Responsible for Justice, Equality & Governance

Parliamentary Secretary for Justice
- In office 13 March 2013 – 29 March 2014
- Prime Minister: Joseph Muscat

Personal details
- Born: 24 May 1980 (age 46) Zejtun, Malta
- Party: Partit Laburista

Owen Bonnici (born 24 May 1980) is a Maltese politician who is incumbent Minister for Accommodation and Lands.

He previously served as Minister of Justice, Culture and Local Government, Minister of Education and Employment, Minister of Equality, Research and Innovation, and Minister of Culture, Lands and Local Government.

== Political life ==
In 2004, he also contested European parliament elections as a Labour Party candidate.

He served as Opposition Spokesperson for Youth and Culture and subsequently for Higher Education, University, Research and Culture and voiced against issues like censorship and advocated for other liberal issues.

During his first term in Parliament, he was appointed by the Labour Party to coordinate the views and suggestions of the elected members of his party and engage with the opposition party members on the Divorce Bill.

As a lawyer in private practice, Bonnici also represented the residents' lobby group for an appeal against the Marsascala recycling plant. This appeal was initially turned down, but later, but later the Civil Court in its Constitutional jurisdiction decided that the appeal should be heard again.

In 2004, he also contested European parliament elections as a Labour Party candidate.

During his first term, he was involved in the Divorce Bill when the Labour Party appointed him to coordinate through the views and suggestions of the elected members of his party and also engage with the opposition party members.

In the 2013 general elections, Bonnici was reflected as the strongest candidate in the district. He was elected again in the 2017 and the 2022 general elections.

In 2020, he was appointed Minister for Education and Labour.

In 2022, Prime Minister Robert Abela appointed Dr Bonnici as Minister for the National Heritage, the Arts and Local Government.

In May 2024 he was appointed as Leader of the House of Representatives.

In 2026, Dr. Bonnici was appointed Minister for Accommodation and Lands.

== Major reforms ==
Bonnici was responsible for a number of initiatives undertaken during the legislature, including the Whistleblowers' Act, Justice Reform and the Individual Investors' Program. When Malta's whistleblower laws were ranked second in European Union, Owen Bonnici had tweeted and Times of Malta reported: It is very easy to speak about the rule of law. It's harder to act and deliver to improve it. That is what we have been doing and will keep doing. This report about #whistleblowerprotection shows that the law we passed in 2013 is one of the best and most robust in the #EU.

Bonnici undertook strong reforms in the field of drug laws in order to stop treating victims of drug abuse as criminals but rather as people who need care and assistance to quit. He said that his reform was overall guided by common sense. We could have done nothing at all on drugs, but we have decided to take a decision and publish a white paper which is practical and clear, Bonnici said about it. The law was met by questions and concerns if it will give a message that it was okay to use drugs. To this, Bonnici responded by saying Former judge at the European Court of Human Rights Giovanni Bonello's appointment as the head of a new drug court showed how serious the legal reform was about helping users while punishing those who lived off the profits of vice.

During his role as the culture minister, he expanded the existing Culture Pass program that allowed free access to various cultural events in the country and included students at all levels - kindergarten, primary and secondary. He also launched Teatru Malta a new theater project that aimed to create new content for people in the country.

In 2015, Bonnici replaced the local enforcement system that was known to be maligned and replaced it with a new agency that would eventually become a regulatory authority.

He also launched a Party financing act along with then Law Commissioner Franco Debono for increased transparency and accountability that would reduce abuse by political parties and candidates. Malta Today reported on this: Bonnici described the current situation was a “free-for-all”, adding that the new law would transform the scenario into a more serious one. The act would see political parties, of any size, and prominent party officials obliged to register with the Electoral Commission. Parties can lose their registration if they fail to present a candidate for ten years.

== Political achievements and reforms ==
In his different ministerial roles, Bonnici succeeded in achieving important milestones and secured major reforms. In his current role, as Minister for the National Heritage, Arts and Local Government, he saw major changes in all these areas.

He inaugurated MICAS, Malta’s first international contemporary art museum, describing it as a ‘cultural legacy’.

In 2023, under his helm NAPA, the National Agency for Performing Arts was formed. This agency governs Teatru Malta, KorMalta, and ŻfinMalta.

A very active agency under his political responsibility is the Valletta Cultural Agency which has continued its mission to showcase the capital city of Malta, Valletta, through events like the Valletta Green Festival, Valletta Pageant of the Seas, and Opera in the Capital.

Heritage Malta, part of Bonnici’s ministerial portfolio, responsible for Malta's cultural sites, recorded high visitor numbers in 2024 and has restored the Grand Master's Palace, among other sites.

The Malta Philharmonic Orchestra is another entity, under his helm, that is expanding Malta’s cultural footprint, expanding Malta's cultural footprint.

Arts Council Malta is one of the most active entities under Bonnici’s ministerial responsibilities. In 2022, Arts Council Malta launched strategy 2025. It is also responsible for prestigious events such as the Venice Arts Biennale and the London Design Biennale.

Under his helm, the National Archives, which has advanced its digitization efforts, making historical records more accessible to the public.

Many initiatives, under Festivals Malta, part of the Ministry for the National Heritage, the Arts and Local Government, have taken place recently. This includes the prestigious Muzika Muzika the local Maltese song and music festival. It is also responsible for the Maltese Carnival, and the highly popular Notte Bianca, a festival of music and culture held annually in Valletta.

Bonnici has recently announced another massive project, the launch of the Culture and Arts Hub a €23 million project due by 2027, which will offer a central space for carnival and cultural activities.

An area that is seeing significant investment, under Bonnici’s helm, is restoration. One of the most notable is that of Villa Guardamangia, which served as the official residence of Princess Elizabeth, later Queen Elizabeth II and Prince Philip when they lived in Malta.

For 2025, 40 restoration projects are planned that will include critical work on the San Nikola bastions, the second phase of the San Pawl bastions, and the Vendome Tower in Marsaxlokk, and other fortifications.

Owen Bonnici is a strong advocate of the important role of culture and the arts in the fight against climate change.Addressing the second ministerial meeting at COP29 in 2024, he explained how culture and art can stump the growing change in climate.He said that Malta “believes that culture and the arts can be at the forefront of global efforts against climate change”.

== Earlier Reforms ==
=== The Justice sector ===
In 2013, he swiftly implemented a major electoral pledge with he passing of a law which provides that corruption cases against politicians are not time barred, and any accused will not be able to invoke prescription if a case is in the criminal court.

This law was one of three legislative projects which had the aim to bolster the rule of law. The second law was a law aimed at regulating party financing – the first one in the history of the country to be enacted. This was introduced in January 2016. By means of this law, political parties will not be able to accept donations of over €25,000 a year from the same person. The law also makes a distinction between donations which are and are not permissible.

When Malta's whistleblower laws were ranked second in European Union, Owen Bonnici had tweeted and Times of Malta reported: It is very easy to speak about the rule of law. It's harder to act and deliver to improve it. That is what we have been doing and will keep doing. This report about #whistleblowerprotection shows that the law we passed in 2013 is one of the best and most robust in the #EU

== Further reforms ==
Bonnici also led a Constitutional reform that would amend the constitution and bring reforms on how judicial appointments are made and more. The reform would create a new commission that would handle judicial appointments of Chief Justice, Attorney General and the President of the Chamber of Advocates and also provide opinions on other judicial appointments.

Owen Bonnici also presented a legislative proposal in September 2016 that allowed people who were undergoing police interrogation to have a lawyer of their preference. This was done followed by a European Union Directive and the reform was given the green light by Parliament.

Owen Bonnici's also pushed forward an initiative that reduced the litigation period over disputed properties by multiple heirs.

As the Minister for Justice, Culture and Local Government, Owen Bonnici set up the Assets Recovery Bureau which was previously not existent and a fully fledged Department for Justice.

In 2017, Minister Owen Bonnici announced that the chairperson of regulatory bodies and politically appointed representatives in foreign countries would go through a consultative parliamentary committee grilling procedure and the scrutiny will be made publicly available prior to their appointment.

Owen Bonnici was reported to be in favour of the proposed amendments to the 1979 Housing Decontrol Ordinance. He believed those were fair to both tenants and land-owners.

During his time in charge of Education and Employment in 2020 Bonnici successfully oversaw the holding of exams and summer school and the sustainable re-opening of schools during the height of the COVID-19 pandemic and at a time where the population was not vaccinated as anti-COVID vaccines were still not available to the general public. The Malta Union of Teachers endorsed the Bonnici's work.

== Peace Initiatives through culture and the arts ==
In his role as a Maltese Cabinet Minister, Bonnici addresses various international conferences. At these conferences, he has often urged for world peace and specifically solidarity with the Palestinians in Gaza. In April 2024, he told the European Socialists Summit in Bucharest, Romania that “Europe must be just as steadfast in calling for peace in Gaza as it is about standing up for Ukraine”.

In November 2023, he visited Ukraine and met with Ukraine's Acting Minister of Culture and Information Policy Rostyslav Karandieiev, in Kyiv. At the meeting, Bonnici “emphasized Malta's unwavering dedication to aiding Ukraine during these challenging times”.

In 2023, While addressing the 42nd session of the UNESCO General Conference in Paris, Minister Bonnici emphasized Malta’s firm commitment to peace, multilateralism and unity and solidarity among nations.

In March 2017, at a European conference titled ‘Cultural Diplomacy: Fostering International Cultural Dialogue, Diversity and Sustainability’ which was held in Malta as part of its Presidency of the EU Council of Ministers, Bonnici highlighted Malta’s belief that our different cultures are fundamental bridges that can bring us together in new ways by strengthening our relationships through understanding.

== Controversy ==
On 30 January 2020, the Constitutional Court of Malta ruled that Minister of Justice Bonnici had breached the human rights of protesters for justice for Daphne Caruana Galizia following the clearing at the foot of the Great Siege Monument throughout 2018 and 2019 during the evenings. The Constitutional Court stated that Bonnici's orders amounted to a "systematic" censorship that led to an "absurd" and "divisive" situation that breached blogger and activist Emmanuel Delia and others' freedom of expression. Bonnici defended himself by saying that the clearings took place a full year after the horrific murder of Daphne Caruana Galizia, in line with obtaining practice elsewhere in Europe and that the protestors themselves had retracted an action of the issuing of a prohibitory injunction when the monument started being cleared at the day's end, as all other national monuments. In passing reference was made to this controversy in a statement by the Council of Europe and the OSCE.
