= Same-sex marriage in Malta =

Same-sex marriage has been legal in Malta since 1 September 2017 following the 66–1 passage of legislation in the Parliament on 12 July 2017. The bill was signed into law by President Marie-Louise Coleiro Preca on 1 August. On 25 August, the Minister for Equality, Helena Dalli, issued a legal notice to commence the law on 1 September. Malta was the first European microstate, the thirteenth country in Europe and the 21st in the world to allow same-sex couples to marry nationwide. Polling suggests that a majority of Maltese people support the legal recognition of same-sex marriage. In 2024, a British wedding planning website named Malta one of the best marriage destinations in the world for same-sex couples.

Malta has allowed civil unions for both same-sex and opposite-sex couples since 2014 following the enactment of the Civil Unions Act. It grants couples in civil unions the same rights, responsibilities, and obligations as marriage, including the right of joint adoption. Parliament gave final approval to the law on 14 April 2014 by a vote of 37 in favour and 30 abstentions. It was signed into law, also by Coleiro Preca, on 16 April and published in the Malta Government Gazette the next day. The first civil union was performed on 13 June 2014.

== Cohabitation ==
On 3 April 2017, the Maltese Parliament approved the Cohabitation Act 2016 (Maltese: Att tal-2016 dwar il-Koabitazzjoni). The act recognises cohabiting couples who have been living together for at least two years and gives cohabitants more rights pertaining to parental and medical decisions, among others. The act defines cohabitation as between two people regardless of gender. President Marie-Louise Coleiro Preca signed the act into law on 7 April, and it went into effect on July 1, 2017.

== Civil unions ==
=== Background and summary ===
Civil unions (Maltese: unjoni ċivili, pronounced [ʊnˈjɔːnɪ tʃɪˈviːlɪ]) were introduced in Malta in spring 2014. These unions provide all of the rights, benefits and responsibilities of marriage. Legislation to establish civil unions was first discussed in the early 2010s, before passing by a vote of 37–0 in the Parliament of Malta on 14 April 2014. MPs of the ruling Labour Party voted in favour of the bill, while all the Nationalist Party MPs abstained.

Before the 2008 elections, the Malta Gay Rights Movement sent a survey to all major political parties asking them for their views on the recognition of same-sex unions. None of the parties supported same-sex marriage; however, all of them supported the recognition of same-sex unions to some extent. The governing Nationalist Party supported extending some rights to cohabitating same-sex couples. The Labour Party supported recognising "same-sex families and partnerships", although it was unknown whether this would be in the form of unregistered cohabitation or registered partnerships. National Action supported civil partnerships that would grant same-sex couples some of the rights of married couples, not including welfare benefits. Democratic Alternative supported civil partnerships providing all of the rights of marriage. On 28 March 2010, Prime Minister Lawrence Gonzi announced that the government was working on a bill to regulate cohabitation, intended to be completed by the end of the year. The draft bill (known as the Civil Partnerships and Rights and Obligations of Cohabitants Bill 2012) was presented by the Minister of Justice, Chris Said, on 28 August 2012, and a public consultation process lasted until 30 September. The bill was introduced, but died in December 2012 due to the fall of the government and dissolution of Parliament.

=== Passage of legislation in 2014 ===
During the 2013 elections campaign, the Labour Party announced its intention to introduce legislation to allow civil unions for same-sex couples if elected in government. This was set to materialise by summer 2013, but was postponed until 2014. Helena Dalli, the Minister for Social Dialogue, Consumer Affairs and Civil Liberties, argued that legalising same-sex marriage would require a referendum, and that the Maltese Government did not intend to put the issue to a popular vote.

On 30 September 2013, the first day of the new legislative session, the Parliament held the first reading of a civil union bill, which was published on 14 October 2013. The legislation would establish civil unions for both same-sex and opposite-sex couples with the same rights as those available to married couples, including joint adoption rights. Despite the fact that people in Malta regardless of sexual orientation were already able to adopt as individuals, opponents made adoption rights the focus of their objections to the legislation. In his 2013 Christmas sermon, Archbishop Charles J. Scicluna condemned adoption by same-sex couples and said that Pope Francis had told him to take a public stand against it. On 25 February 2014, the bill passed the committee stage. The third reading was postponed because President George Abela indicated he would not sign it. Marie-Louise Coleiro Preca, who indicated she would sign it, became president on 4 April. The bill was approved in its third reading on 14 April in a 37 to 0 vote, with all Labour Party members present in favor and all members of the opposition Nationalist Party abstaining. It was signed into law by President Coleiro Preca on 16 April and published in the Malta Government Gazette on 17 April, officially becoming the Civil Unions Act 2014 (Maltese: Att tal-2014 dwar l-Unjonijiet Ċivili). The first civil union was performed on 13 June 2014. On 20 June 2014, the Ministry for Home Affairs and National Security published regulations, based on which, the country recognises civil unions and partnerships registered abroad, regarded by the Ministry as having equivalent status to Malta's civil unions.

14 April 2014 vote in the Parliament
Party	Voted for	Voted against	Abstained	Absent (Did not vote)
G Labour Party	37: Carmelo Abela; Christopher Agius; Anthony Agius Decelis; Evarist Bartolo; Owen Bonnici; Ian Borg; Leo Brincat; Charles Buhagiar; Stefan Buontempo; Luciano Busuttil; Chris Cardona; Justyne Caruana; Helena Dalli; Deo Debattista; Joe Debono Grech; Michael Falzon; Godfrey Farrugia; Marlene Farrugia; Michael Farrugia; Chris Fearne; Roderick Galdes; Etienne Grech; Louis Grech; José Herrera; Emmanuel Mallia; Franco Mercieca; Joe Mizzi; Konrad Mizzi; Joseph Muscat; Silvio Parnis; Anton Refalo; Joseph Sammut; Deborah Schembri; Silvio Schembri; Edward Scicluna; Karmenu Vella; Edward Zammit Lewis	–	–	1: George Vella
Nationalist Party	–	–	30: David Agius; Robert Arrigo; Frederick Azzopardi; Jason Azzopardi; Toni Bezzina; Charlo Bonnici; Antoine Borg; Simon Busuttil; Claudette Buttigieg; Ryan Callus; Joe Cassar; Robert Cutajar; Mario de Marco; Giovanna Debono; Kristy Debono; Albert Fenech; Tonio Fenech; Beppe Fenech Adami; Ċensu Galea; Mario Galea; Michael Gonzi; Claudio Grech; Carmelo Mifsud Bonnici; Paula Mifsud Bonnici; Marthese Portelli; Clyde Puli; George Pullicino; Chris Said; Stephen Spiteri; Francis Zammit Dimech	–
Total (Note: The Speaker of the House of Representatives, Angelo Farrugia, votes only in case of a tied vote.)	37	0	30	1
Total	54.4%	0.0%	44.1%	1.5%

Following President Coleiro Preca's signature of a 2017 law legalising same-sex marriage in Malta, civil unions remain in effect and available for both opposite-sex and same-sex couples. Couples in a civil union established before 1 September 2017 could convert their union into a marriage until 1 December 2022. These unions ended upon conversion, and the resulting marriage was deemed to have subsisted from the date when the civil union was formed. After this date, couples seeking to convert their union into a marriage will first need to dissolve their civil union and then go through all the formalities of marriage.

=== Statistics ===
47 same-sex civil unions had taken place in Malta by April 2015. This had increased to 153 in November 2016, and 188 in April 2017. According to reports published during parliamentary debates on the same-sex marriage bill at the end of June 2017, about 200 same-sex civil unions had been registered by that time. Since the introduction of same-sex marriage in Malta, the number of new civil unions has fallen significantly. In 2018, only 4 unions were registered, with 3 of these being between same-sex couples and 1 between an opposite-sex couple.

== Same-sex marriage ==
Laws regarding same-sex partnerships in Europe¹ Marriage Civil union Limited domestic recognition (cohabitation) Unrecognized Constitution limits marriage to opposite-sex couples ¹ May include recent laws or court decisions that have not yet entered into effect.

=== Background ===
In March 2016, Prime Minister Joseph Muscat said at an International Women's Day event that he was personally in favour of legalising same-sex marriage in the country and that it was "time for a national debate" on the issue. Opposition Nationalist Party leader Simon Busuttil responded by stating that though Muscat was attempting to use the issue of same-sex marriage to distract from a government scandal, he could foresee no difficulty in amending Malta's civil union legislation to legalise same-sex marriage. The country's leading gay rights organisation subsequently called for a bill to be put forward opening marriage to all couples irrespective of gender without delay.

On 21 February 2017, Minister for Social Dialogue, Consumer Affairs and Civil Liberties Helena Dalli said she was preparing a bill to legalise same-sex marriage. The next day, Dalli stated that it was up to the Cabinet to decide whether the bill would be introduced to Parliament before the next election, provisionally scheduled for 2018. However, on 1 May snap elections were called for 3 June 2017, delaying the issue to the next legislative term. Of the major parties, Prime Minister Joseph Muscat stated that his Labour Party would promptly introduce a bill to legalise same-sex marriage if re-elected, whilst Nationalist Party leader Simon Busuttil confirmed that his party's electoral manifesto would include support for same-sex marriage.

=== Passage of legislation in 2017 ===
After the Labour Party won the election comfortably, Muscat said that the Labour government intended to pass same-sex marriage legislation in the Parliament before the end of summer. On 18 June 2017, the Prime Minister announced that the same-sex marriage legislation would go through both readings on the first day of the parliamentary session, which would start the following week. On 23 June, the Nationalist Party confirmed its intention to vote in favour of the bill, and introduce amendments at the committee stage.

On 24 June 2017, the first reading of the bill was moved during the State Opening of Parliament. However, a number of Nationalist MPs raised concerns about parts of the law, specifically sections which replaced gender-specific references with gender-neutral terminology, and raised the prospect of the party having a free vote on the bill. The bill's second reading started on 26 June. Both Democratic Party MPs announced their intention to support the bill the same day. The second reading of the bill was completed on 5 July, with every member voting in favour except Nationalist MP Edwin Vassallo, and the bill passed the committee stage in the Consideration of Bills Committee on 6, 7 and 10 July. The committee rejected all amendments proposed by the Nationalist Party. On 12 July, the bill passed its third reading by a vote of 66–1, with every MP voting in favour except Vassallo. It was signed into law by President Marie-Louise Coleiro Preca on 1 August 2017. On 25 August, the Minister for European Affairs and Equality, Helena Dalli, issued a legal notice to commence the law on 1 September 2017. Florida-based Celebrity Cruises announced on 11 October 2017 that it would perform legal same-sex marriages on its ships while in international waters following the legalization of same-sex marriage in Malta, where most of the Celebrity fleet is registered.

12 July 2017 vote in the Parliament
Party	Voted for	Voted against	Abstained	Absent (Did not vote)
G Labour Party	37: Carmelo Abela; Robert Abela; Anthony Agius Decelis; Clayton Bartolo; Evarist Bartolo; Glenn Bedingfield; Owen Bonnici; Ian Borg; Byron Camilleri; Clint Camilleri; Chris Cardona; Justyne Caruana; Rosianne Cutajar; Helena Dalli; Deo Debattista; Michael Falzon; Aaron Farrugia; Michael Farrugia; Julia Farrugia Portelli; Chris Fearne; Roderick Galdes; Etienne Grech; Clifton Grima; Silvio Grixti; José Herrera; Emmanuel Mallia; Jean Claude Micallef; Joe Mizzi; Konrad Mizzi; Alex Muscat; Joseph Muscat; Silvio Parnis; Anton Refalo; Silvio Schembri; Edward Scicluna; Edward Zammit Lewis; Stefan Zrinzo Azzopardi	–	–	–
Nationalist Party	27: David Agius; Karol Aquilina; Robert Arrigo; Jason Azzopardi; Ivan Bartolo; Toni Bezzina; Simon Busuttil; Claudette Buttigieg; Ryan Callus; Therese Comodini Cachia; Kevin Cutajar; Robert Cutajar; Mario de Marco; Jean Pierre Debono; Kristy Debono; Maria Deguara; Beppe Fenech Adami; Mario Galea; Karl Gouder; Claudio Grech; Carmelo Mifsud Bonnici; Marthese Portelli; Clyde Puli; Chris Said; Hermann Schiavone; Stephen Spiteri; David Stellini	1: Edwin Vassallo	–	–
Democratic Party	2: Godfrey Farrugia; Marlene Farrugia	–	–	–
Total	66	1	0	0
Total	98.5%	1.5%	0.0%	0.0%

The Marriage Act and other Laws (Amendment) Act, 2017 (Maltese: Att tal-2017 li jemenda l-Att dwar iż-Żwieġ u Liġijiet oħrajn) replaced all references to "husband and wife" in the Criminal Code, the Civil Code and the Code of Organization and Civil Procedure with the gender-neutral term "spouses". It also amended the Interpretation Act to state that the term "spouse" "shall be construed as referring to a spouse of either sex who has contracted marriage", and modified the Civil Union Act to allow couples to convert their civil unions into marriages. Article 11 of the Marriage Act was also amended to read: Marriage may be contracted either in a civil form between two consenting individuals, that is to say in the form established by this Act for civil marriage, or in a religious form, that is to say in a religious form in accordance with the provisions of this Act. (Note: Maltese: Żwieġ jista' jsir jew f'forma ċivili, jiġifieri fil-forma stabbilita b'dan l-Att għal żwieġ ċivili bejn żewġ individwi li jagħtu l-kunsens tagħhom, jew f'forma reliġjuża, jiġifieri f'forma reliġjuża skont id-disposizzjonijiet ta' dan l-Att.)

=== Statistics ===
7 same-sex marriages were performed in Malta in 2017, followed by 65 in 2018, 81 in 2019, 39 in 2020, and 51 in 2021. 10 same-sex marriages were performed in Gozo between 2017 and 2021. There were also 12 same-sex divorces during this period. By October 2023, a total of 435 same-sex couples had married in Malta.

=== Religious performance ===
The Catholic Church opposes same-sex marriage and does not allow its priests to officiate at such marriages. In December 2023, the Holy See published Fiducia supplicans, a declaration allowing Catholic priests to bless couples who are not considered to be married according to church teaching, including the blessing of same-sex couples. There are reports that several priests secretly performed blessings for same-sex couples prior to Fiducia. A Catholic Dominican priest, Father Mark Montebello, acting contrary to church guidelines, blessed the rings of a same-sex couple in an engagement ceremony in Valletta in April 2015.

== Public opinion ==
A Eurobarometer poll conducted in 2006 showed Malta at 18% support for same-sex marriage. However, support among young people appears to be much higher. An October 2009 poll conducted by a student organisation at the University of Malta showed that 49% of university students supported same-sex marriage, while 35% were opposed and 16% were undecided. A poll conducted in October 2011 found that 56.5% of university students supported same-sex marriage.

In June 2012, a poll commissioned by Malta Today found that support for same-sex marriage had increased significantly, with 60% of Maltese people aged 18–35 supporting same-sex marriage. The poll found a generational gap, with only 23% of people older than 55 supporting the change. Overall, the poll found that 41% of the population were in favour of same-sex marriage and that 52% were against it, a big change in comparison to 2006, when only 18% of the population supported it.

A November 2013 survey showed that 69.9% of Maltese people supported the legalisation of civil unions. However, at the same time, only 24.7% supported the right of same-sex couples to adopt.

The 2015 Eurobarometer found that 65% of Maltese respondents thought same-sex marriage should be allowed throughout Europe, while 29% were opposed. An April 2016 poll from The Malta Independent found that 61% of Maltese people supported same-sex marriage, with 25% opposed, 10% responding "don't care" and 4% unsure. The poll found a large age gap: 92% of 18–24-year-olds supported same-sex marriage, whereas only 42.5% of those aged 65 and above were in favour. When divided by political affiliation, 52.5% of Nationalist Party voters and 70% of Labour voters supported same-sex marriage. Women were also more likely to support same-sex marriage (63%) than men (60%). The 2019 Eurobarometer found that 67% of Maltese people thought same-sex marriage should be allowed throughout Europe, while 25% were opposed. The 2023 Eurobarometer showed that support had increased to 74%, while 24% were opposed. The survey also found that 78% of Maltese people thought that "there is nothing wrong in a sexual relationship between two persons of the same sex", while 21% disagreed.

== See also ==
- LGBT rights in Malta
- Recognition of same-sex unions in Europe
