= List of members of the parliament of Malta, 2017–2022 =

This is a list of members of the Maltese House of Representatives elected to the 13th legislature in the 2017 general election. They are arranged by district.

The governing party is the Labour Party backed by 1 Independent MP, while the Nationalist Party and 2 Independent MPs form the opposition.

== List by office ==
Office	Officeholder	Year	Political party
President of Malta	Marie-Louise Coleiro Preca	2014–2019	Partit Laburista
President of Malta	George Vella	2019–present	Partit Laburista
Prime Minister of Malta	Joseph Muscat	2013–2020	Partit Laburista
Prime Minister of Malta	Robert Abela	2020–present	Partit Laburista
Leader of Opposition	Adrian Delia	2017–2020	Partit Nazzjonalista
Leader of Opposition	Bernard Grech	2020–present	Partit Nazzjonalista
Speaker	Anġlu Farrugia	2013–present	Partit Laburista

== Labour Party ==
- Carmelo Abela, District 3
- Robert Abela (Prime Minister), District 6
- Christopher Agius, District 2 (resigned) (replaced by Bedingfield)
- Anthony Agius Decelis
- Clayton Bartolo, District 12 casual
- Evarist Bartolo, District 10 District 12 resigned
- Glenn Bedingfield (Government Whip), (casual election)
- Owen Bonnici, District 5
- Ian Borg, District 7 Camilleri Byron
- Clint Camilleri, District 4 District 13
- Chris Cardona (District 8 resigned replaced by Castaldi)
- Clyde Caruana
- Justyne Caruana, District 13
- Ian Castaldi Paris, District 8 (casual)
- Rosianne Cutajar, District 6 (casual)
- Miriam Dalli, District 2 (also elected in District 3 resigned)
- Deo Debattista, District 1
- Michael Falzon, District 9 resigned District 10
- Aaron Farrugia, District 1
- Michael Farrugia, District 12
- Julia Farrugia Portelli, District 5
- Chris Fearne, District 3 (also elected in District 4 resigned) replaced by Etienne Grech)
- Roderick Galdes, District 6
- Etienne Grech, District 4 casual
- Clifton Grima, District 9
- Silvio Grixti, District 3
- José Herrera, District 1
- Emmanuel Mallia, District 9 (casual)
- Jean Claude Micallef, District 3 (casual)
- Joe Mizzi, District 2 (also elected in District 4 resigned)
- Konrad Mizzi, District 4
- Alex Muscat, District 2 (also elected in District 5 resigned)
- Silvio Parnis, District 4
- Anton Refalo, District 13
- Silvio Schembri, District 6 resigned
- Edward Scicluna, District 7 resigned replaced by Gullia District 8 resigned (replaced by Zammit-Lewis)
- Lewis Edward Zammit, District 8 (casual)
- Azzopardi Stefan Zrinzo. District 5 (casual)

== Nationalist ==
- Agius David, District 8 District 11 resigned
- Karol Aquilina, District 10 casual
- Robert Arrigo, District 9 (District 10 resigned)
- Jason Azzopardi, District 4 District 13 supplemental resigned
- Ivan J Bartolo (District 9 casual, District 11 casual)
- Toni Bezzina, District 5
- Simon Busuttil District 11 resigned District 12 resigned
- Claudette Buttigieg, District 12
- Ryan Callus, District 6
- Therese Comodini Cachia, District 8
- Kevin Cutajar, District 13
- Robert Cutajar (Opposition Whip), District 12
- Mario de Marco, District 1
- Kristy Debono, District 7 resigned District 9
- Maria Deguara, District 11 casual
- Adrian Delia, District 7 co-opted Farrugia District 7 (casual)
- Marlene Farrugia District 10
- Beppe Fenech Adami, (District 7 resigned) District 8
- Mario Galea, District 3
- Karl Gouder, District 10
- Bernard Grech (Opposition Leader)
- Claudio Grech, District 1
- Peter Micallef District 7 (casual)
- Carmelo Mifsud Bonnici, District 4 (added as supplemental member)
- Marthese Portelli District 9 resigned District 13 resigned
- Clyde Puli, District 6
- Chris Said, District 13
- Hermann Schiavone, District 5
- Spiteri Stephen, District 2
- David Stellini District 3 casual resigned
- David Thake, District 12 casual
- Edwin Vassallo

== Independent ==
- Godfrey Farrugia
- Marlene Farrugia
- Konrad Mizzi

== Bibliography ==
- Maltese Parliament website: Electoral districts
