= List of mayors of places in Malta =

List of mayors in every locality of Malta from 1993, when the election of local councils was introduced.

== Ħ'Attard ==
Motto: Florigera rosis halo

| Party | Mayor | Term (start-end) |
|---|---|---|
| Partit Nazzjonalista (PN) | Henry Frendo | 1994–1998 |
| Partit Nazzjonalista (PN) | Norbert Pace | 1998–2008 |
| Partit Nazzjonalista (PN) | John Bonnici | 2008–2012 |
| Partit Nazzjonalista (PN) | Stefan Cordina | 2012–present |

== Ħal Balzan ==
Motto: Hortibus undique septa

| Party | Mayor | Term (start-end) |
|---|---|---|
| Partit Nazzjonalista (PN) | Joseph Stellini | 1993–1996 |
| Partit Nazzjonalista (PN) | Marselle Delicata | 1996–1999 |
| Partit Nazzjonalista (PN) | John Zammit Montebello | 1999–2015 |
| Partit Nazzjonalista (PN) | Ian Spiteri | 2015–2021 |
| Partit Nazzjonalista (PN) | Angelo Micallef | 2021–present |

== Il-Birgu Città Vittoriosa ==
Motto: Vicit Urbe

| Party | Mayor | Term (start-end) |
|---|---|---|
| Malta Labour Party (MLP) | John Boxall | 1994–1995 |
| Malta Labour Party (MLP) | Joseph C. Azzopardi | 1995–1998 |
| Malta Labour Party (MLP); Partit Laburista (PL) | John Boxall | 1998–present |

== Birkirkara ==
Motto: In hoc signo vinces

| Party | Mayor | Term (start-end) |
|---|---|---|
| Partit Nazzjonalista (PN) | Michael Asciak | 1994-1994 |
| Partit Nazzjonalista (PN) | George Debattista | 1994–1997 |
| Partit Nazzjonalista (PN) | Michael Asciak | 1997–1998 |
| Partit Nazzjonalista (PN) | Tonio Fenech | 1998–2003 |
| Partit Nazzjonalista (PN) | Doris Borg | 2003–2006 |
| Partit Nazzjonalista (PN) | Michael Fenech Adami | 2006–2013 |
| Partit Laburista (PL) | Joanne Debono Grech | 2013–2024 |
| Partit Nazzjonalista (PN) | Desirei Grech | 2024–present |

== Birżebbuġa ==
Motto: Pax Salus Que Omnibus

| Party | Mayor | Term (start-end) |
|---|---|---|
| Independent; Malta Labour Party (MLP); Partit Laburista (PL) | Joseph Farrugia | 1994–2015 |
| Partit Laburista (PL) | Kevin Barun | 2015–2016 |
| Partit Laburista (PL) | Joseph Cutajar | 2016–2019 |
| Partit Laburista (PL) | Joseph Farrugia | 2019–2021 |
| Partit Laburista (PL) | Scott Camilleri | 2021–present |

== Bormla Città Cospicua ==
Motto: Ingens Amplectitur Agger

| Party | Mayor | Term (start-end) |
|---|---|---|
| Independent | Joseph Carbonaro | 1994–2000 |
| Malta Labour Party (MLP) | Paul Muscat | 2000–2003 |
| Malta Labour Party (MLP) | Joseph Scerri | 2003–2013 |
| Partit Laburista (PL) | Alison Zerafa Civelli | 2013–2022 |
| Partit Laburista (PL) | Marco Agius | 2022–present |

== Ħad-Dingli ==
Motto: Non Segnis Quies Ruris

| Party | Mayor | Term (start-end) |
|---|---|---|
| Independent | Angelo Azzopardi | 1994–1999 |
| Malta Labour Party (MLP) | Joseph Mary Abela | 1999–2005 |
| Malta Labour Party (MLP); Partit Laburista (PL) | Ian Borg | 2005–2013 |
| Partit Laburista (PL) | Venera Micallef | 2013–2015 |
| Partit Laburista (PL) | Sandro Azzopardi | 2015–2019 |
| Partit Laburista (PL) | Raymond Schembri | 2019–present |

== Il-Fgura ==
- Anthony Degiovanni (1994–1997)
- Saviour Camilleri (1997–2000)
- Anthony Degiovanni (2000–2004)
- Darren Marmarà (2004–2010)
- Byron Camilleri (2010–2017)
- Pierre Dalli (2017–2024)
- Clayton Cascun Portelli (2024-)

== Il-Furjana Borgo Vilhena ==
Motto: Flores mulcent aurae educat imber

| Party | Mayor | Term (start-end) |
|---|---|---|
| Independent | Publio Agius | 1994–1998 |
| Floriana l-Ewwel (Note: Non-registered ad-hoc residents group at the time.) | Nigel Holland | 1998–2004 |
| Malta Labour Party (MLP) | John Mary Brincat | 2004-2004 |
| Aġenda Soċjali Għal Furjana | Publio Agius | 2004–2007 |
| Floriana l-Ewwel (Note: Non-registered ad-hoc residents group at the time.) | Nigel Holland | 2007–2012 |
| Malta Labour Party (MLP) | Davina Sammut | 2012-2012 |
| Floriana l-Ewwel (Note: Non-registered ad-hoc residents group at the time.) | Nigel Holland | 2012–2015 |
| Partit Laburista (PL) | Davina Sammut | 2015–2022 |
| Partit Laburista (PL) | Vincent Borg | 2022–2024 |
| Floriana l-Ewwel | Nigel Holland | 2024–present |

== Il-Fontana (It-Triq tal-Għajn) ==
Motto: Indundatione Ferax

- Anthony Borg (1993–1996)
- Saviour Borg (1996–2002)
- Valentino Cassar (2002–2005)
- Saviour Borg (2005–2024)
- Thomas Mizzi (2024–present)

== Għajnsielem ==
Motto: Ob Fontem Prosperitas

- Francis Cauchi (1994–2015)
- Franco Ciangura (2015–2019)
- Kevin Cauchi (2019–)

== L-Għarb ==
Motto: In Extremo Vigilat

- Louis Apap (1994–1995)
- Maurice Cauchi (1995–1996)
- Alfred Cauchi (1996–1997)
- David Apap (1997– )

== Ħal Għargħur ==
Motto: Excelsior

- Mario Gauci (1994–2015)
- Ġiljan Aquilina (2015–2019)
- Helen Gauci (2019–2025)
- Mariah Meli (2025-2026)
- Francesca Attard (2026-)

== L-Għasri ==
Motto: Ex Labore Fructus

- Rita Cutajar (1993–1996)
- Emanuel Mintoff (1996–1999)
- Carmen Grech (1999–2002)
- Andrew Vella (2002–2013)
- Daniel Attard (2013– )

== Ħal Għaxaq ==
Motto: Laeta Sustineo

- Joseph Mary Abdilla (1994–2006)
- Emanuel Vassallo (2006–2013)
- Darren Abela (2013– )

== Il-Gudja ==
Motto: Pluribus Parens

| Party | Mayor | Term (start-end) |
|---|---|---|
| Partit Laburista (PL) | Angelo Agius | 1994–1997 |
| Partit Laburista (PL) | John Mary 'Mario' Calleja | 1997–2019 |
| Partit Laburista (PL) | Marija Sara Vella Gafà | 2019–2024 |
| Partit Laburista (PL) | Romeo Baldacchino | 2024- |

== Il-Gżira ==
Motto: Recte Floreat

| Party | Mayor | Term (start-end) |
|---|---|---|
| Indipendenti Liberali | Albert Rizzo | 1994–1998 |
| Partit Nazzjonalista (PN) | Ian Micallef | 1998–2001 |
| Malta Labour Party (MLP) | Anthony Buhagiar | 2001–2004 |
| Partit Nazzjonalista (PN) | Albert Rizzo | 2004–2007 |
| Malta Labour Party (MLP) | Chris Bonnett | 2007–2012 |
| Malta Labour Party (MLP) | Roberto Cristiano | 2012–2015 |
| Partit Laburista (PL) | Conrad Borg Manché | 2015–2023 |
| Independent | Conrad Borg Manché | 2023–2024 |
| Partit Laburista (PL) | Neville Chetcuti | 2024–present |

== Il-Ħamrun ==
Motto: Propera Augesco

- Peter Attard (1994–1998)
- Joseph M. Zammit Cordina (1998–2001)
- Luciano Busuttil (2001–2012)
- Vincent Bonello (2012–2015)
- Christian Sammut (2015–)

== L-Iklin ==
- Joseph Buttigieg (1994–1996)
- Anthony Dalli (1996–2019)
- Dorian Sciberras (2019- )

== L-Isla (Senglea) (Città Invicta) ==
- Stephen Perici (1994–1997)
- Louis Henwood (1997–1999)
- Joseph Casha (1999–2012)
- Justin John Camilleri (2012–2015)
- Joseph Casha (2015–2019)
- Clive Pulis (2019- )

== Il-Kalkara ==
Motto: A Calce Nomen

- Michael Zarb (1994–2000)
- Michael Cohen (2000–2013)
- Speranza Chircop (2013–2019)
- Wayne Aquilina (2019- )

== Ta' Kerċem ==
Motto: Flectar non Frangar

- Paul Gauci (July 1994-June 2000)
- Alfred Stellini (July 2000-March 2001)
- Joseph Grima (April 2001-March 2012)
- Mario Azzopardi (April 2012 – )

== Ħal Kirkop ==
Motto: Parva non Iners

- Michael Baldacchino (1994–1996)
- Joseph Busuttil (1996–1999)
- Charles Mansueto (1999–2002)
- Mario Salerno (2002–2012)
- Carmel Calleja (2012–2015)
- Terence Agius (2015–2024)
- Matthew Agius Zammit (2024–)

== Ħal Lija ==
Motto: Suave Fructu Rubeo

- Joseph Mary Mangion (1994–1997)
- Magdalen Magri Naudi (1997–2000)
- Joseph Mary Mangion (2000–2003)
- Mary Magdalen Magri (2003–2006)
- Ian Castaldi Paris (2006–2014)
- Mary Magdalen Magri (2014–2019)
- Anthony Dalli (2019- )

== Ħal Luqa ==
Motto: Oras Prospicio

- Michael Cachia (1994–2001)
- John Schembri (2001– )

== Il-Marsa ==
Motto: Portu Novu

- Francis Debono (1994–1997)
- Frank Zammit (1997–1999)
- Francis Debono (1999–2012)
- Christopher Spiteri (2012)
- Francis Debono (2012–2019)
- Josef Azzopardi (2019–2024)
- Luke Farrugia (2024-)

== Marsaskala (Wied il-Għajn) ==
Motto: Għajn ta' Kenn u Mistrieħ

- Marvic Attard Gialanze (1994–1997)
- Charlie Zammit (1997–2000)
- Carmelo Mifsud (2000–2006)
- Mario Calleja (2006– )

== Marsaxlokk ==
Motto: Portus Herculis

- Paul Sciriha (1994–1998)
- Carmelo Bugeja (1998–2004)
- Edric Micallef (2004–2007)
- Stephen Caruana (2007–2012)
- Edric Micallef (2012–2015)
- Horace Gauci (2015–2019)
- Steven Grech (2019- )

== L-Imdina Città Notabile ==
- George Attard (1994–2000)
- Mario Galea Testaferrata (2000–2003)
- Peter Dei Conti Sant Manduca (2003– )

== Il-Mellieħa ==
Motto: Ex Sale Et Melle Nomen Meum

- Joe Borg (1993–1996)
- Sammy Vella (1996–1999)
- Joe Borg (1999–2002)
- John Francis Buttigieg (2002–2008)
- Robert Cutajar (2008–2013)
- John Francis Buttigieg (2013–2017 )
- Dario Vella (2017–2024)
- Gabriel Micallef (2024– Present)

== L-Imġarr ==
Motto: Żgħir b'Qalb Kbira

- Victor Camilleri (1994–2000)
- Paul Vella (2000– )

== Il-Mosta ==
Motto: Spes Alit Ruricolam

- Nazzareno Vassallo (1994–1998)
- Joseph P. Demartino (1998–2007)
- Paul Chetcuti Caruana (2007–2012)
- Shirley Farrugia (2012–2015)
- Edwin Vassallo (2015–2016)
- Ivan Bartolo (2016–2017)
- Keith Cassar (2017–2019)
- Romilda Baldacchino Zarb (2019–2022)
- Chris Grech (2022–2025)
- Joseph Gatt (2025- )

== L-Imqabba ==
Motto: Non Nisi Per Ardua

- Emanuel Buttigieg (1994–2004)
- Noel Galea (2004–2005)
- Nicholas Briffa (2005–2008)
- Emmanuel Galea (2008–2013)
- Nicholas Briffa (2013–2015)
- Charlene Zammit (2015–2019)
- Omar Farrugia (2019–2022)
- Grace Marie Zerafa (2022- )

== L-Imsida ==
Motto: Novissima Surgo

- Joseph Cassar Naudi (1994–1997)
- Carmel Grima (1997–2006)
- Alexander Sciberras (2006–2009)
- Clifton Grima (2009 – 2013)
- Margaret Baldacchino Cefai (2013 –2024)
- Charles Selvaggi (2024- )

== L-Imtarfa ==
- Josephine Abela (2000–2004)
- John Camilleri (2004–2006)
- Josephine Abela (2006–2008)
- Anton Mifsud (2008–2013)
- Daniel Attard (2013–2021)
- Kyle Mifsud (2021–2024)
- Dale Hayman (2024-)

== Il-Munxar ==
Motto: Parvulus Sed Munitus

- Joseph Debrincat (1994–1998)
- Paul Curmi (1998–2001)
- Joseph Sultana (2001–2015)
- Carmen Said (2015–2019)
- Damien Christ Spiteri (2019-)

== In-Nadur ==
Motto: Vigilant

- Joseph Tabone (1993–1996)
- Eucharist Camilleri (1996–1999)
- Chris Said (1999–2008)
- Miriam Portelli (2008–2012)
- Charles Said (2012–2015)
- Edward Said (2015–)

== In-Naxxar ==
Motto: Prior Credidi

- Angelo Xuereb (1994–2000)
- Maria Fatima Deguara (2000–2017)
- Ann-Marie Muscat Fenech Adami (2017–2024)
- Chris Deguara (2024- )

== Raħal Ġdid (Paola) Casal Nouvo / Casal Paola ==
- Silvio Parnis (1994–1996)
- Ino Bonello (1996–1999)
- Raymond Attard(1999–2007)
- Dominic Grima (2007–2012)
- Roderick Spiteri (2012–2015)
- Dominic Grima (2015–2024)
- Jason Silvio (2024-)

== Pembroke ==
Motto: Għal Kull Bżonn

- Joseph Demicoli (1994–1996)
- Gino Cauchi (1996–1999)
- Joseph Zammit (1999–2013)
- Dean Hili (2013– 2024)
- Kaylon Zammit (2024 - )

== Tal-Pietà ==
- Malcolm Mifsud (1994–2006)
- Santo Attard (2006–2013)
- Keith John Tanti (2013–2022)
- Zoya Attard (2022-2024)
- Stefano Savo (2024- )

== Il-Qala ==
Motto: In Tempestate Perfugium

- Paul Buttigieg (1994–2012)
- Clint Camilleri (2012–2017)
- Paul Buttigieg (2017-)

== Ħal Qormi Città Pinto ==
Motto: Altior ab Imo

- George Portelli (1994–1998)
- Clyde Puli (1998–2001)
- Roderick Galdes (2001–2004)
- Jesmond Aquilina (2004–2012)
- Rosianne Cutajar (2012–2017)
- Jesmond Aquilina (2017–2019)
- Renald Falzon (2019–2020)
- Josef Masini Vento (2020- )

== Il-Qrendi ==
Motto: Tyrium Dirutas Servo Moles

- Nicholas Aquilina (1993–1996)
- Daniel Farrugia (1996–1999)
- Carmel Falzon (1999–2013)
- David Michael Schembri (2013– )

== Ir-Rabat, Għawdex Città Victoria ==
Motto: A Magna Maxima

- Victor Galea Pace (1994–1996)
- Joseph Dimech (1996–1997)
- Paul Galea (1997–2000)
- Paul M. Cassar (2000–2003)
- Vivienne Mary Galea Pace (2003–2006)
- Robert Tabone (2006–2009)
- Samuel Azzopardi (2009–2019)
- Josef Schembri (2019–2024)
- Brian Azzopardi (2024- )

== Ir-Rabat ==
Motto: Ħaġra Prezzjuża Magħrufa Bħala Tleqq

- Alfred Sharples (1994–2000)
- Rudolph Grima (2000–2003)
- Charles Azzopardi (2003–2006)
- Francis Fabri (2006–2007)
- Alexander (Sandro) Craus (2007–2013)
- Charles Azzopardi (2013–2019)
- Alexander(Sandro) Craus (2019- )

== Ħal Safi ==
Motto: Sine Macula

- Peter Paul Busuttil (1994–2012)
- Francis Callus (2012–2015)
- Johan Mula (2015–)

== San Ġiljan ==
Motto: Litoris Aquas Sinuato Margine Cingo

- Charles Sciberras (1994–1996)
- Peter Bonello (1996–2015)
- Karl Gouder (2015–2016)
- Guido Dalli (2016–2019)
- Albert Buttigieg (2019–2022)
- Guido Dalli (2022-)

== San Ġwann ==
- Antoine Cesareo (1994–2000)
- Helen Fenech (2000–2003)
- Kurt Guillaumier (2003–2006)
- Joe Borg (2006–2008)
- Rene` Savona Ventura (2008–2010)
- Joseph Agius (2010 - 2012)
- Etienne Bonello Depuis (2012–2019)
- Trevor Fenech (2019–2024)
- Dominic Cassar (2024- )

== San Lawrenz ==
Motto: Dominus Protectio Mea

- Noel Formosa (1994–2012)
- Anthony Formosa (2012–2015)
- Noel Formosa (2015–)

== San Pawl il-Baħar ==
Motto: In Christo Renati Sumus

- Michael Gonzi (1993–1996)
- Paul Bugeja (1996–2008)
- Graziella Galea (2008–2012)
- Mario Salerno (2012–2013)
- Raymond Tabone (2013–2015)
- Graziella Galea (2015–2018)
- Anne Fenech (2018–2019)
- Alfred Grima (2019–2024)
- Censu Galea (2024- )

== Ta' Sannat ==
Motto: Labor Ante Omnia

- Francis Cassar (1994–1997)
- Rose Anne Buttigieg (1996–1999)
- Anthony Mercieca (1999–2002)
- Carmel Camilleri (2002–2007)
- Anthony Mercieca (2007–2009)
- Philip Vella (2009– )

== Santa Luċija ==
- Frederick Cutajar (1994–2015)
- Terrence Ellul (2015–2019)
- Charmaine St.John (2019- )

== Santa Venera ==
Motto: Virtus In Infirmitatate Per Fictur

- Michael Caruana (1994–2005)
- Stephen Sultana (2005–2008)
- Elizabeth Vella (2008–2012)
- Horace J. Anastasi (2012–2013)
- Stephen Sultana (2013–2024)
- Gianluca Falzon (2024- )

== Is-Siġġiewi Città Ferdinand ==
Motto: Labore et Virtute

- Angelo Farrugia (1994–1998)
- Nenu Aquilina (1998–2001)
- Robert Musumeci (2001–2012)
- Karol Aquilina (2012–2017)
- Alessia Psaila Zammit (2017–2019)
- Kurtsein Sant (2019–2020)
- Dominic Grech (2020–2024)
- Julian Borg (2024-2026)
- Ryan Cachia (2026-)

== Tas-Sliema ==
Motto: Celer ad Oras Surgo

- Robert Arrigo (1994–2003)
- Albert Bonello (2003–2006)
- Marina Arrigo (2006–2009)
- Nicky Dimech (2009–2010)
- Joanna Gonzi (2010–2012)
- Anthony Chircop (2012–2022)
- Graziella Attard Previ (2022-2022)
- John Pillow (2022- )

== Is-Swieqi ==
Motto: Reduci ad Pristinum Publicum Statum

- Antoinette Naudi (1994–1998)
- Dolores Cristina (1998–2001)
- Paul Abela (2001–2004)
- Anthony Barbaro Sant (2004–2007)
- Carmen Said (2007–2012)
- Noel Muscat (2012– )

== Ħal Tarxien ==
Motto: Tyrii Genure Coloni

- Anthony Busuttil (1994–1997)
- Joseph Mercieca (1997–2000)
- Paul Farrugia (2000–2013)
- Joseph Abela (2013–2015)
- Paul Farrugia (2015–2019)
- Joseph Galea (2019–present)

== Ta' Xbiex ==
Motto: Sole Illuminata Marique Amplecta

- William A. Cassar Torregiani (1993–1999)
- Antoinette Vassallo (1999–2013)
- Maximilian Zammit (2013– )

== Il-Belt Valletta Città Umillisima ==
| Party | Mayor | Term (start-end) |
|---|---|---|
| Partit Nazzjonalista (PN) | Hector Bruno | 1993–1999 |
| Partit Nazzjonalista (PN) | Paul Borg Olivier | 1999–2008 |
| Partit Nazzjonalista (PN) | Alexiei Dingli | 2008–2019 |
| Partit Nazzjonalista (PN) | Christian Micallef | 2019-2019 |
| Partit Laburista (PL) | Alfred Zammit | 2019–2024 |
| Partit Laburista (PL) | Olaf McKay | 2024–present |

== Ix-Xagħra ==
Motto: Librat Et Evolat

- Mario Xerri (1994–1998)
- Anthony Attard (1998–2004)
- Joseph Spiteri (2004–2007)
- Joseph Cordina (2007–2019)
- Christian Joseph Zammit (2019–2023)
- Aaron Agius (2023–2024)
- Victor John Curmi (2024- )

== Ix-Xewkija ==
Motto: Nemo Me Impune Lacessit

- Augustine Dingli (1994–1999)
- Mario Emanuel Camilleri (1999–2002)
- Monica Vella (2002–2013)
- Paul Azzopardi (2013–2019)
- Hubert Saliba (2019–2024)
- Simona Refalo (2024- )

== Ix-Xgħajra ==
- Francesco Saverio Minuti (1994–1997)
- Anton Meilak (1997–2000)
- Anthony Valvo (2000–2019)
- Neil Attard (2019- )

== Ħaż-Żabbar Città Hompesch ==
- Thomas Farrell (1994–1995)
- Renato Agius Muscat (1995–1997)
- Felix Zarb (1997–1999, died in office)
- Joe Fenech (1999–2000)
- Domenic Agius (2000–2006)
- Clyde Caruana (2006–2009)
- Domenic Agius (2009–2013)
- Quinton Scerri (2013–2014, resigned)
- Marc Vella Bonnici (2014–2019)
- Jorge Grech (2019– )

== Iż-Żebbuġ, Gozo ==
Motto: Terra Sublimis

- Michael Cefai (1994–1998)
- Harry Debono (1998–2004)
- Carmelo Saliba (2004–2012)
- Nicky Saliba (2012–2021)
- Marlene Cini (2021–2024)
- Baskal Saliba (2024- )

== Ħaż-Żebbuġ, Malta Città Rohan ==
Motto: Semper Virens

- Godfrey Farrugia (1993–1999)
- Paul Bonnici (1999–2001)
- Dominic Zammit (2001–2002)
- Joseph Ciantar (2002–2005)
- Paula Vella Sciriha (2005– 2006)
- Brian Bonnici (2006–2009)
- Alfred Grixti (2009–2015)
- Sarah Agius (2015–2019)
- Malcolm Paul Galea (2019–2022)
- Mark Camilleri (2022–2024)
- Steve Zammit Lupi (2024-)

== Iż-Żejtun Città Beland ==
Motto: Palladis clara munera

- Ronald Scicluna (1994–1996)
- Joe Attard (1996–2017)
- Maria Dolores Abela (2017–2024)
- Joan Agius (2024-)

== Iż-Żurrieq ==
Motto: Sic a Cyaneo Aequore

- Salvu Saliba (1993–1996)
- Joe Cassar (1996–2002)
- Ignatius Farrugia (2002–2008)
- Silvio Izzi Savona (2008–2012)
- Ignatius Farrugia (2012–2019)
- Rita Grima (2019- )
