= Shadow Cabinet of Simon Busuttil =

The Nationalist Party Shadow Cabinet of Dr Simon Busuttil was announced on May 14, 2013. It was formed following the 9 March election which replaced the PN majority with a Labour majority.

Former Prime Minister and Leader of the Nationalist Party Leader Dr Lawrence Gonzi announced his retirement and resigned from parliament on July 17, 2013. Upon his resignation, Dr Chris Said's election as Secretary General of the Nationalist Party on June 5, 2013, and Mr Antoine Borg's casual election to parliament on July 30, 2013, Dr Simon Busuttil announced changes in the shadow cabinet on August 3, 2013.

== List ==
- Dr Simon Busuttil – Leader of the Opposition
- Dr Mario de Marco – Deputy Leader of the Opposition for Parliamentary Affairs and Spokesperson for the Economy, Investment and Small Business
- Dr Beppe Fenech Adami – Deputy Leader of the Opposition for Party Affairs and Spokesperson for Justice
- Dr Chris Said - Secretary General of the Party
- Mr Ċensu Galea – Deputy Speaker and Spokesperson for Agriculture and Fisheries
- Mr David Agius – Group Whip and Spokesperson for Local Government
- Mr Frederick Azzopardi – Group Deputy Whip and Spokesperson for Gozo (health services and education)
- Ms Giovanna Debono – Spokesperson for Gozo
- Mr George Pullicino – Spokesperson for Energy and the Conservation of Water
- Mr Tonio Fenech – Spokesperson for Finance
- Dr Joseph Cassar – Spokesperson for Education
- Dr Jason Azzopardi – Spokesperson for Home Affairs and National Security
- Dr Francis Zammit Dimech – Spokesperson for Culture and Communications
- Dr Carm Mifsud Bonnici – Spokesperson for Foreign Affairs
- Mr Clyde Puli – Spokesperson for the Family and Social Solidarity
- Mr Mario Galea – Spokesperson for the Elderly
- Mr Robert Arrigo – Spokesperson for Tourism
- Mr Charlo Bonnici – Spokesperson for Sustainable Development, the Environment and Climate change
- Dr Stephen Spiteri – Spokesperson for Employment and Rights of Persons with Disability
- Dr Michael Gonzi – Spokesperson for Animal Welfare
- Mr Anthony Bezzina – Spokesperson for Transport and Infrastructure
- Ms Claudette Buttigieg – Spokesperson for Social Dialogue and Civil Liberties
- Mr Ryan Callus – Spokesperson for Planning and Simplification of Administrative Processes
- Mr Robert Cutajar – Spokesperson for Youth and Sport
- Ms Kristy Debono – Spokesperson for Competitiveness and Economic Growth
- Professor Albert Fenech – Spokesperson for Research and Innovation
- Mr Claudio Grech – Spokesperson for Health
- Dr Paula Mifsud Bonnici – Spokesperson for Competition and Consumer Affairs
- Dr Marthese Portelli – Spokesperson for European Affairs
- Mr Antoine Borg - Spokesperson for the EU Presidency 2017 and EU funds
- Committee of the Parliamentary Group for the South Chairperson: Dr Stephen Spiteri (Members: Mr Mario Galea, Dr Carm Mifsud Bonnici, Dr Jason Azzopardi, Mr Anthony Bezzina)
