= Simon Busuttil =

Maltese politician (born 1969)

Simon Busuttil MOM
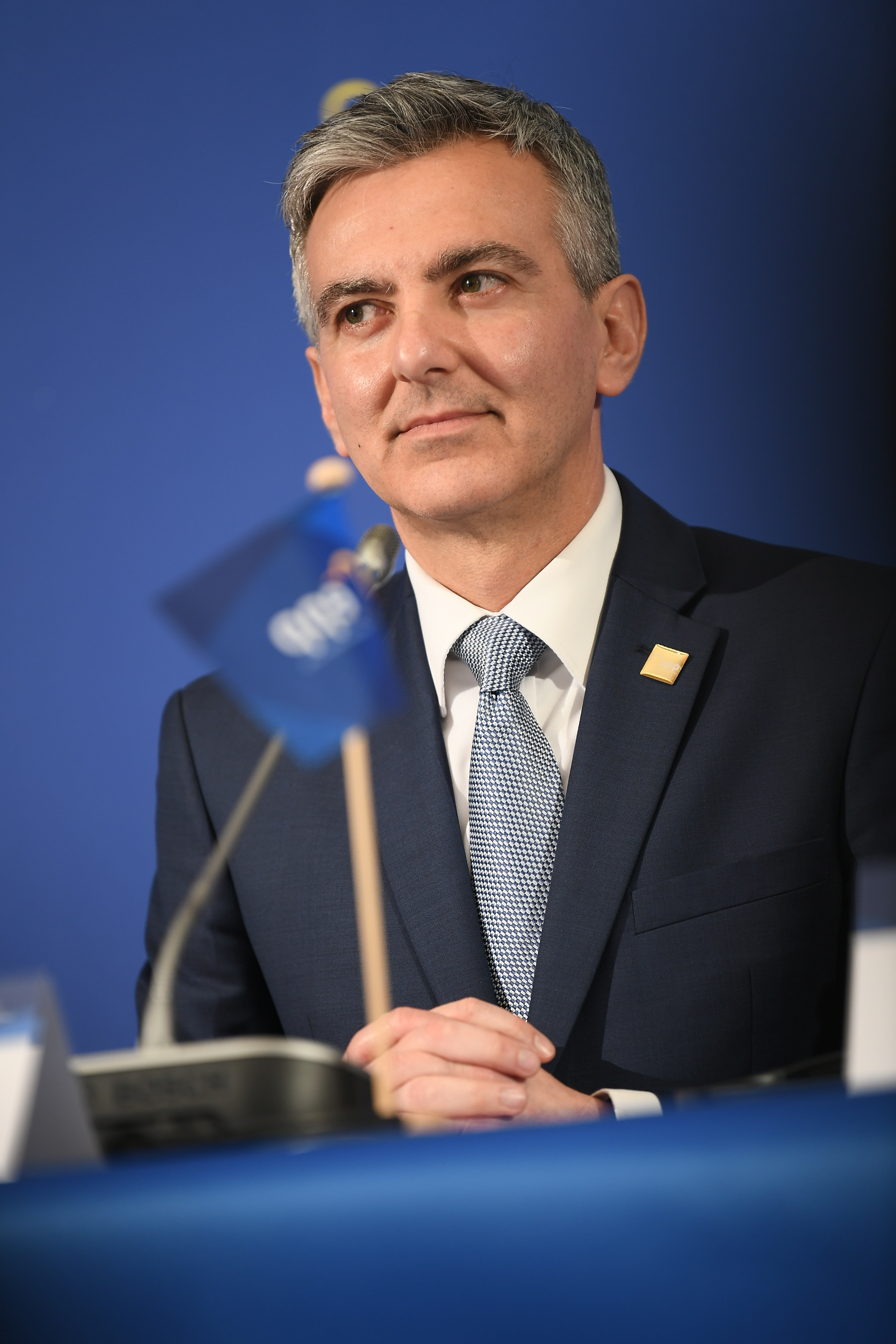
- Busuttil at a March 2017 EPP Malta Congress

Secretary-General of the European People's Party Group
- In office 1 May 2020 – 1 November 2024
- Preceded by: Martin Kamp
- Succeeded by: Ouarda Bensouag

Leader of the Opposition
- In office 13 May 2013 – 4 October 2017
- President: Marie Louise Coleiro Preca
- Prime Minister: Joseph Muscat
- Preceded by: Lawrence Gonzi
- Succeeded by: Adrian Delia

Leader of the Nationalist Party
- In office 8 May 2013 – 15 September 2017
- Deputy: Beppe Fenech Adami; Mario de Marco
- Preceded by: Lawrence Gonzi
- Succeeded by: Adrian Delia

Deputy Leader of the Nationalist Party
- In office 30 November 2012 – 8 May 2013
- Preceded by: Tonio Borg
- Succeeded by: Beppe Fenech Adami

Member of Parliament
- In office 6 April 2013 – 29 February 2020
- Constituency: Twelfth District

Member of the European Parliament
- In office 12 June 2004 – 10 March 2013

Personal details
- Born: 20 March 1969 (age 57) Attard, State of Malta
- Party: Nationalist Party
- Children: 3
- Education: University of Malta; University of Sussex

Simon Busuttil MOM (born 20 March 1969) is a Maltese politician and lawyer who last served as the Secretary General of the EPP Group (European People's Party) in the European Parliament from 2020 until 2024. Formerly, he was Leader of the Opposition. and Leader of the Nationalist Party in Malta and a Member of the European Parliament for Malta.

== Education ==
Busuttil, who is from Lija, graduated as Doctor of Laws (University of Malta, 1993), MA in European Studies (University of Sussex, 1994) and Magister Juris in International Law (University of Malta, 1995). As a student he was President of the Maltese Christian Democrat Students, SDM (1989–91), Student Representative on the Senate of the University of Malta (1991–92) and International Secretary of the Maltese National Youth Council (1992).

== Career ==
Busuttil's career is mostly linked with EU affairs as well as with his parliamentary roles in the European Parliament and in the national Parliament in Malta. In 1999, Busuttil was appointed Head of the Malta-EU Information Centre (MIC) and led Malta's public awareness campaign ahead of the 2003 EU membership referendum. At the same time he was also a member of Malta's Core Negotiating Group (negotiating Malta's membership in the EU) and the Malta-EU Steering and Action Committee (MEUSAC) in 1999.

=== Member of the European Parliament ===
In 2004, Busuttil was elected as an MEP with the Nationalist Party in the election for the European Parliament netting the largest number of personal preference votes, 58,899 votes. He was the first Maltese MEP to address the European Parliament on 21 July 2004. He was re-elected to the European Parliament in the 2009 election, again registering the largest vote tally of votes ever, or 68,782 votes.

As an MEP he was a member of the bureau of the European People's Party (EPP) and sat on various committees including the European Parliament's Committee on Budgetary Control and its Committee on Budgets. But his strongest contribution was within the Civil Liberties, Justice and Home Affairs Committee where he was the Coordinator (Spokesperson) for the EPP Group and covered issues that include the sensitive areas of common European immigration and asylum policy.

=== Deputy Leader of the Nationalist Party and MP ===
In November 2012, he was elected Deputy Leader of the Nationalist Party following the resignation of Tonio Borg. He was elected an MP in the 2013 general election.

=== Leader of the Nationalist Party and Leader of the Opposition ===
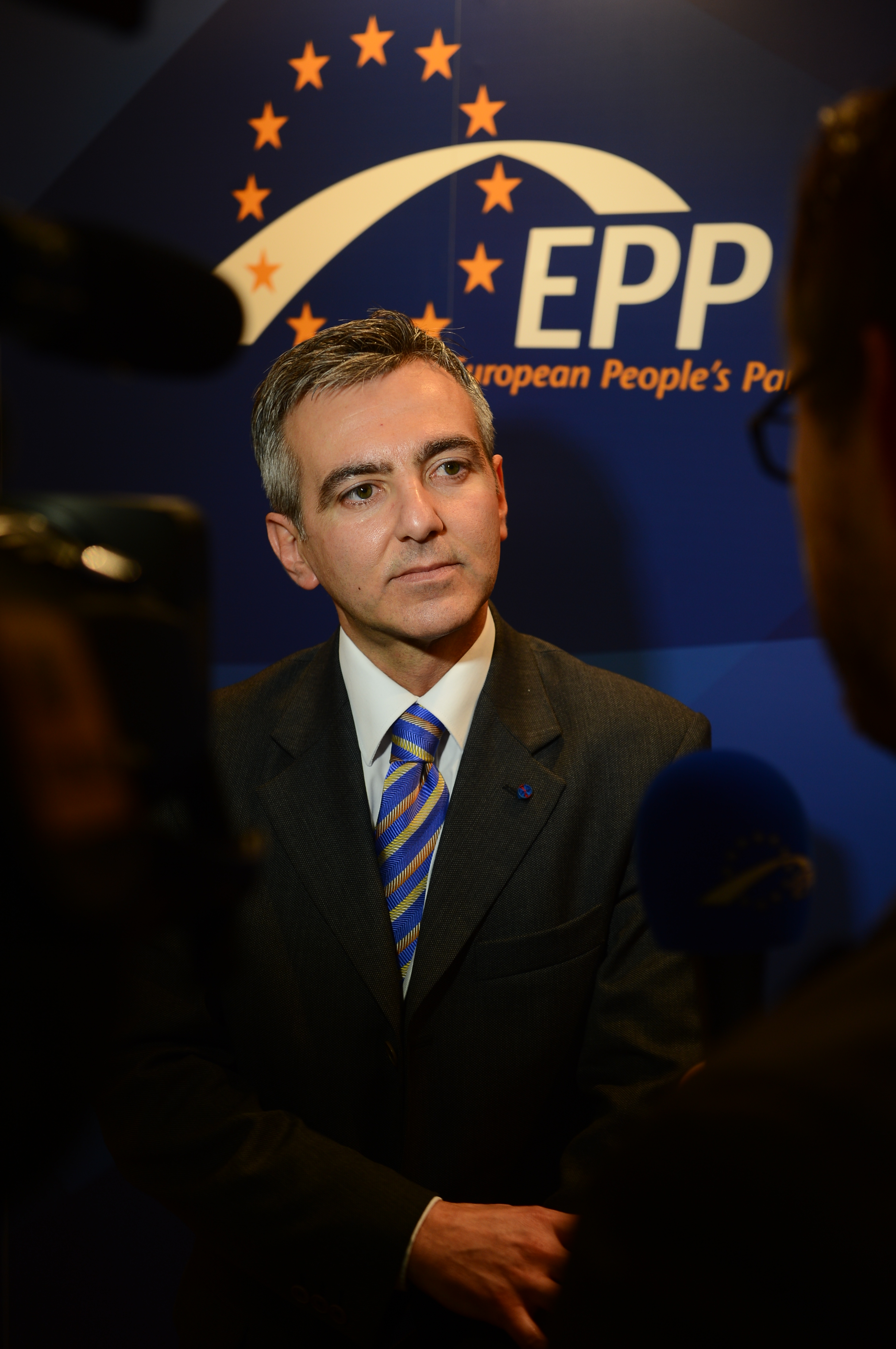
Busuttil at a December 2013 EPP Summit

Immediately after the elections, incumbent Leader Lawrence Gonzi announced that he would not be seeking re-election for the role of leader of the Nationalist Party. Busuttil was one of four candidates running for leadership along with Mario De Marco, Raymond Bugeja and Francis Zammit Dimech. On 4 May 2013, at the first round of voting, Busuttil obtained 50.3% of the votes while Mario De Marco obtained 38.5% and conceded the race, leaving Busuttil de facto leader elect. A further vote was taken on 8 May in order for him to officially receive 2/3 of the votes, the threshold required by the election rules. Simon Busuttil was confirmed Leader having exceeded 90% of the votes cast. As leader of the opposition, Busuttil also announced his Shadow Cabinet in May 2013.

Busuttil's term as Leader of the PN and of the Opposition was characterised by a his choice to champion the rule of law and the fight against corruption in Malta. He led the Opposition charge against the Labour Government led by Joseph Muscat following the revelations made by Daphne Caruana Galizia and PanamaPapers in February and April 2016 respectively. In April 2017, he published a leaked report that implicated the Chief of Staff in money laundering activities linked to Malta's golden passport scheme. The following month, in May 2017, Busuttil published yet another leaked report and presented evidence of alleged illegal transfers to the tune of €650,000 paid by Keith Schembri to the former Managing Director of The Times of Malta, Adrian Hillman. The revelations increased pressure on the Labour Government and Prime Minister Joseph Muscat and eventually led to an early election being called on 1 May 2017. In reaction, Busuttil said that people faced a stark choice between Joseph Muscat's interests and Malta's interest and appealed to voters to 'Vote for Malta'. He claimed that the elections were a matter of trust, not just proposals. He claimed that Muscat called the snap election to evade justice. Busuttil led the General Election campaign based on a platform of the fight against corruption and the importance of Rule of Law.

In that election, Busuttil contested the 11th and 12th Electoral Districts in the 2017 Maltese general election as the leader of the Nationalist party. However, on 4 June 2017, after polls on the previous day, it was clear that the Malta Labour Party had won by a 55% margin. The win was historic as the Labour party won the election by a record margin, and the margin was seen to be even bigger than in the 2013 Maltese general election. Many reasons were attributed for the result, including the fact that the economy was experiencing record growth under Joseph Muscat while at the same time the PN gave little reason for being elected other than a good governance pledge, which even that was not considered authentic because of the corruption scandals that rocked the party back during their time in government. Busuttil conceded defeat and the following day announced his resignation as leader of the Nationalist Party along with the entire party administration. He met party activists on 6 June 2017 and explained that although he would be leaving, the party should "never give up" in its principled fight for the rule of law. He also announced a new and more open procedure for electing the new leader, with all party members being able to vote to elect their leader for the first time.

=== Backbench MP ===
On 17 September 2017, Busuttil was succeeded by Dr Adrian Delia as leader of the Nationalist Party and on 6 October 2017 as Leader of the Opposition. In February 2018, Delia appointed Busuttil as Shadow Minister for Good Governance, asking him to continue his fight for the rule of law. Nevertheless relations between them turned sour when Delia asked Busuttil to resign from the PN parliamentary group in the wake of the news of the publication of the conclusions of the 'Egrant' magisterial inquiry into the alleged ownership of one of the Panama company by the Prime Minister's wife, which concluded that no proof was found that Egrant belonged to the Prime Minister's wife although the inquiry did not find details of the actual owner. Delia had not yet been given a copy of the inquiry when he accused Busuttil. The allegation had first been made by Daphne Caruana Galizia, and was believed by Simon Busutil to the point of putting the allegation centre stage in the 2017 election campaign. Busuttil warned Delia that he should not side with Muscat and refused to suspend himself. The Administrative Council of the Nationalist Party met later during 22 June 2018 in order to discuss the events, and backed Delia's request to Busuttil, asking the latter to make way so that the party can move on in an effective matter, as no one can be considered bigger than the party. Despite this, he still found the support of many prominent people in the PN parliamentary group, among them being his former deputies Mario de Marco and Beppe Fenech Adami who supported him saying that the party should unite for greater strength. Other MPs that lent their name to this cause included Claudette Buttigieg, Therese Comodini Cachia, Marthese Portelli, Claudio Grech, Karol Aquilina, Karl Gouder and Jason Azzopardi, as well as MEP David Casa. MEP Roberta Metsola requested that the matter was discussed within party organs. MP Chris Said offered to mediate the situation. Delia would eventually relent, which would prove to be one of many incidents regarding internal party politics.

=== Secretary General of the EPP Group in the European Parliament ===
On 14 January 2020, Simon Busuttil was announced as the new Secretary General of the EPP Group in the European Parliament. To take up this Brussels-based post, Busuttil announced that he would resign his parliamentary seat at the end of February 2020. He officially took over his new responsibility of Secretary General of the EPP Group on 1 May 2020.

Busuttil's term as Secretary-General ended in 1 November 2024 and he was succeeded by Ouarda Bensouag.

== Controversies ==
Busuttil was subject to criticism on a number of direct orders that he was awarded from previous Governments under the Nationalist administration. Replies to a series of parliamentary questions revealed that a total of €49,015.56 were awarded by the Ministry for Transport and Infrastructure and its entities to Europa Research and Consultancy Services Ltd, of which Opposition leader Simon Busuttil was the founding director. Additionally, contracts amounting to Lm82,144.13 between 1999 and 2004 were also awarded by the Ministry for Foreign Affairs. The Nationalist Party had said that these direct orders were related to contracts that have been awarded to his firm between 1999 and 2004 related to his services rendered in the run-up to the EU referendum.

== Decorations ==
National

- 2003: Member of the National Order of Merit of Malta

Others

- 2004: Winner of The Outstanding Young Person Award of the Junior Chamber (Malta)

Party political offices
Preceded by Tonio Borg	Deputy Leader of the Nationalist Party; 2012–2013	Succeeded by Beppe Fenech Adami
Preceded by Lawrence Gonzi	Leader of the Nationalist Party; 2013–2017	Succeeded by Adrian Delia
