= Deguara =

Deguara is a surname. Notable people with the surname include:

- Josiah Deguara (born 1997), American football tight end
- Maria Deguara (born 1949), Maltese politician
- Samuel Deguara (born 1991), Maltese-Italian basketball player
