= District 11, Malta =

Electoral district in Malta

District 11
- Parliament of Malta constituency
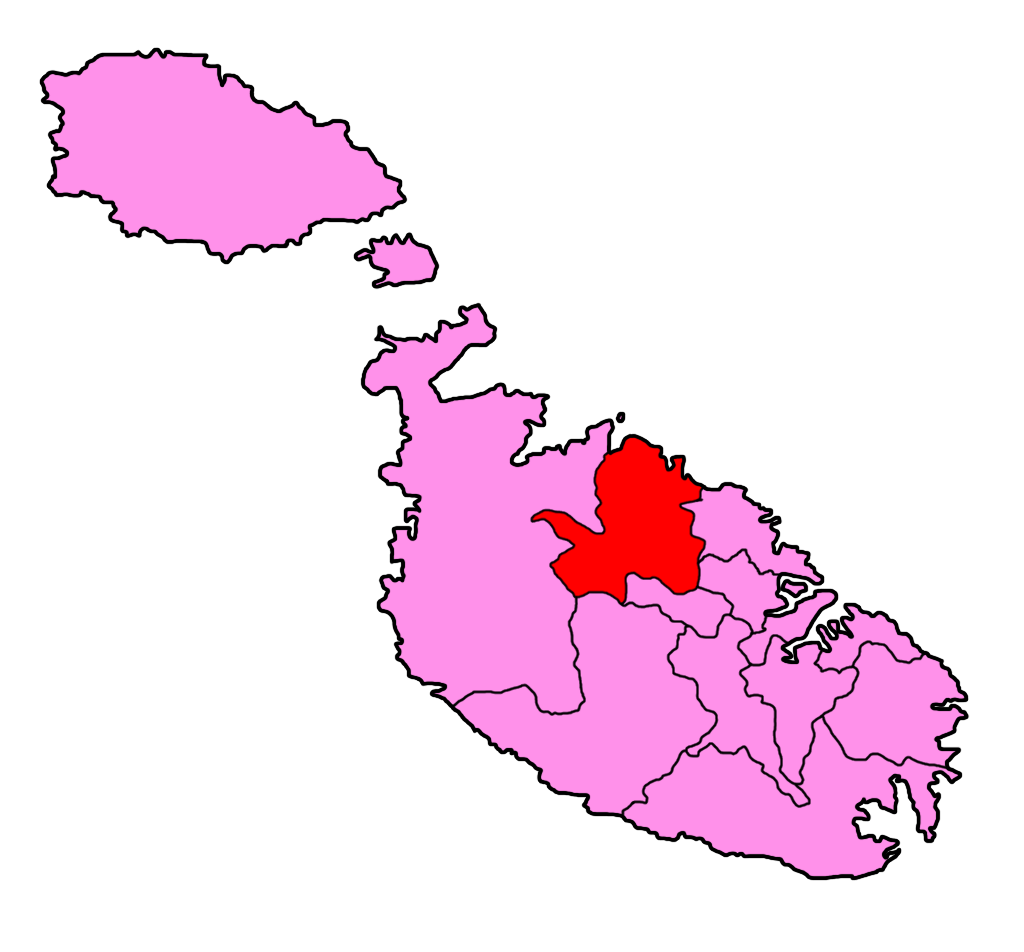
- District within Malta

Current constituency
- Created: 1976
- Seats: 5

District 11 is an electoral district in Malta. It was established in 1976. Its boundaries have changed many times but it currently consists of the localities of Attard, Mdina, Mosta and the hamlet of Burmarrad.

== Representatives ==
Election	Representatives				
1976	Daniel Micallef (Labour)	Paul Xuereb (Labour)	Giorgio Borg Olivier (Nationalist)	John Muscat (Nationalist)	Sammy (Salvatore) Abela (Nationalist)
1981	Daniel Micallef (Labour)	Paul Xuereb (Labour)	Carm Lino Spiteri (Nationalist)	John Muscat (Nationalist)	Pierre Muscat (Nationalist)
1987	Daniel Micallef (Labour)	Charles Buhagiar (Labour)	Frank Portelli (Nationalist)	Tony Abela (Nationalist)	Pierre Muscat (Nationalist)
1992	Alfred (Freddie) Micallef (Labour)	Michael Farrugia (Labour)	Josef Bonnici (Nationalist)	Lawrence Gatt (Nationalist)	Louis Deguara (Nationalist)
1996	Anglu Farrugia (Labour)	Michael Farrugia (Labour)	Eddie Fenech Adami (Nationalist)	Edwin Vassallo (Nationalist)	Louis Deguara (Nationalist)
1998	Angelo Farrugia (Labour)	Michael Farrugia (Labour)	Eddie Fenech Adami (Nationalist)	Edwin Vassallo (Nationalist)	Louis Deguara (Nationalist)
2003	Angelo Farrugia (Labour)	David Agius (Nationalist)	Eddie Fenech Adami (Nationalist)	Edwin Vassallo (Nationalist)	Louis Deguara (Nationalist)
2008	Angelo Farrugia (Labour)	David Agius (Nationalist)	Anthony Agius Decelis (Labour)	Edwin Vassallo (Nationalist)	Louis Deguara (Nationalist)
2013	Charló Bonnici (Nationalist)	David Agius (Nationalist)	Anthony Agius Decelis (Labour)	Edwin Vassallo (Nationalist)	Louis Grech (Nationalist)
2017	Charló Bonnici (Nationalist)	David Agius (Nationalist)	Anthony Agius Decelis (Labour)	Edwin Vassallo (Nationalist)	Ivan Bartolo (Nationalist)
2022	Bernard Grech (Nationalist)	David Agius (Nationalist)	Romilda Baldacchino Zarb (Labour)	Alex Muscat (Labour)	Ivan Bartolo (Nationalist)

== 2017 General Election ==
2017 general election: District 11 - 5 seats
Party	Candidate	FPv%	Count																						
Party	Candidate	FPv%	1	2	3	4	5	6	7	8	9	10	11	12	13	14	15	16	17	18	19	20	21	22	23
Nationalist	Simon Busuttil	47.1	11266																						
Labour	Decelis Agius	12.3	2950	2964	2964	2968	2968	2984	2984	2985	2995	2997	2997	3039	3040	3066	3067	3069	3069	3075	3356	3357	3757	3771	3780
Labour	Alex Muscat	10.2	2431	2446	2447	2449	2449	2457	2457	2457	2458	2461	2461	2504	2507	2529	2530	2536	2536	2542	2819	2820	3363	3374	3382
Labour	Chris Cardona	9.5	2274	2280	2280	2282	2282	2286	2286	2286	2294	2297	2298	2333	2333	2337	2337	2339	2339	2342	2668	2670	3241	3246	3246
Labour	Deborah Schembri	5.2	1249	1259	1260	1260	1260	1269	1270	1271	1272	1279	1279	1335	1336	1357	1360	1362	1362	1368	1603	1605			
Labour	Michael Farrugia	4.7	1121	1130	1130	1131	1131	1133	1133	1134	1137	1140	1140	1161	1161	1172	1174	1178	1178	1179					
Nationalist	David Agius	2.4	581	3525	3525	3526	3545	3547	3571	3581	3585	3588	3636	3638	3685	3717	3837	4013							
Nationalist	Edwin Vassallo	1.8	438	1764	1764	1764	1777	1777	1785	1799	1805	1807	1816	1817	1839	1850	1923	1991	1995	2271	2284	2877	2886	4811	
Nationalist	Ivan Bartolo	0.9	222	1064	1064	1066	1072	1073	1080	1084	1088	1089	1109	1109	1132	1142	1184	1244	1257	1539	1548	2155	2163		
Democratic Alternative (Malta)	Carmel Cacopardo	0.8	184	216	216	218	218	221	225	228	243	327	329	330	356										
Labour	Rachel Tua	0.8	182	183	184	184	184	205	206	207	207	209	209												
Nationalist	Maria Deguara	0.6	150	597	597	597	599	599	606	613	614	615	630	630	708	720	774	834	838						
Nationalist	Calascione Perici	0.6	148	873	873	873	876	876	885	891	891	894	900	901	915	921	964	1051	1057	1265	1269				
Democratic Alternative (Malta)	Ralph Cassar	0.4	106	119	121	121	121	122	122	124	131														
Nationalist	Shirley Cauchi	0.4	87	212	212	212	212	213	217	244	250	255	264	265											
Nationalist	Alex Mangion	0.3	80	385	385	386	389	390	396	399	399	401	412	412	440	457	492								
Moviment Patrijotti Maltin	Randon Farrugia	0.3	78	83	98	108	108	109	110	113															
Labour	Fleur Vella	0.3	75	75	75	75	75																		
Nationalist	Graziella Galea	0.3	72	347	347	347	350	350	353	356	356	357	368	369	378	390									
Nationalist	Carmel Polidano	0.3	60	83	84	84	86	86	90																
Nationalist	Simone Aquilina	0.2	53	130	130	130	130	130	134	135	136	137													
Nationalist	Connie Scerri	0.1	32	81	81	81	83	83																	
Alleanza Bidla	Saviour Xuereb	0.1	30	31	33																				
Moviment Patrijotti Maltin	Naged Megally	0.1	23	23																					
Nationalist	Giorgio Schembri	0.1	18	54	54	54																			
Electorate: 26,244 Valid: 23,910 Spoilt: 288 Quota: 3,986 Turnout: 24, 198 (92.2%)
