= Antoinette Vassallo =

Commissioner for Children (Malta)
- Incumbent
- Assumed office 1 February 2022
- Preceded by: Pauline Miceli

Mayor of Ta' Xbiex
- In office 1999–2013
- Preceded by: Josephine Farrugia
- Succeeded by: Ralph Mangion

Chairperson of the Housing Authority (Malta)
- In office April 2013 – September 2017

Board Director, Malta Communications Authority (MCA)
- In office April 2008 – February 2013

Board Director, Malta Industrial Parks (MIP)
- In office October 2017 – October 2019

Vice Chairperson of the Children And Young Persons Advisory Board (CYPAB)
- In office June 2018 – December 2018

Chairperson of the Children And Young Persons Advisory Board (CYPAB)
- In office December 2018 – June 2020

Vice Chairperson of the Home Help Board
- Incumbent
- Assumed office March 2020

Board member, Committee for the strengthening of the family within the Ministry (KFT)
- Incumbent
- Assumed office April 2020

Board Member, Committee of St Vincent De Paul Long Term Care facility
- Incumbent
- Assumed office April 2020

Personal details
- Party: Labour Party (Malta)
- Spouse: Adrian Vassallo (Former Labour MP)
- Profession: Nurse (former)

Antoinette Vassallo is a Maltese public official and former politician with the Labour Party. She served as Mayor of Ta' Xbiex from 1999 until 2013, chaired the Housing Authority between 2013 and 2017, and was appointed Commissioner for Children in 2022.

== Early life and career ==
Vassallo trained as a nurse, graduating in 1978, and worked in nursing until 1985.

== Local government ==
She entered local politics in March 1999 when she contested local council elections with the Labour Party. Vassallo was elected Mayor of Ta' Xbiex, a position she held until 2013.

=== Mayor of Ta' Xbiex ===
- Preceded by: Josephine Farrugia
- Succeeded by: Ralph Mangion

== Housing Authority ==
Following her tenure as mayor, Vassallo was appointed Chairperson of the Housing Authority in April 2013. She held the post until September 2017, overseeing initiatives in social housing and affordable accommodation policies.

== Commissioner for Children ==
On 1 February 2022, Vassallo was appointed as Malta's Commissioner for Children, succeeding Pauline Miceli.

== Personal life ==
Vassallo is married to former Labour MP Adrian Vassallo.

== See also ==
- Labour Party (Malta)
- List of mayors of Malta
