= Edwin Vassallo =

Maltese politician and businessman (born 1961)

Member of Parliament
- In office 26 November 2016 – 20 February 2022
- In office 5 December 1996 – 7 January 2013

Mayor of Mosta
- In office 2015–2016
- Preceded by: Shirley Farrugia
- Succeeded by: Ivan Bartolo

Personal details
- Born: June 24, 1961 (age 65)
- Party: Nationalist Party (until 2023;2025 – ) Independent (2023 – 2025)
- Spouse: Caroline Vassallo
- Children: 2
- Education: University of Malta

Edwin Vassallo (born 24 June 1961) is a Maltese politician and businessman who served who served as a member of the Parliament of Malta from 1996 to 2022 with the Nationalist Party. He was first elected to Parliament in the 1996 Maltese general election, and took office on 5 December 1996, and would serve until 20 February 2022 when Parliament dissolved before the 2022 elections. Vassallo was defeated in 2022 elections. Vassallo served as a Parliamentary Secretary (junior minister) in various capacities under the premierships of Eddie Fenech Adami and Lawrence Gonzi from 1998 until 2008. He also served as the mayor of Mosta from 2015 to 2016. Vassallo was also a member of the Parliamentary Petitions Committee in the Thirteenth Legislature from 2017 until 2022.

A shopkeeper, Vassallo chose to run in the 1996 elections for the Nationalist Party. Over the years, Vassallo was widely regarded as one of the most Catholic ultra-conservative members of Parliament. The Malta Today wrote in 2022 that his "shopkeeper mentality gave him a lack of sophistication that ironically brought him the allure of a man of the people, a marked distinction in a party of lawyers." Vassallo had been one of the most vocal opponents of the introduction of divorce in Malta, which was approved by voters in a 2011 referendum. He was also the only MP to oppose the introduction of same-sex marriage in Malta in 2017, and also voted against a domestic violence bill in 2018 which integrated the Istanbul Convention into Maltese law.

== Post-parliamentary political career ==
Edwin Vassallo claimed in a video in 2023 to have left the Nationalist Party citing his values and in turn founded a think-tank called the Solidarity Movement (Maltese: Moviment Solidarjetà), which he led as coordinator. Vassallo, through MS, has collaborated with the People's Party on a press-conference regarding road projects and works in his native Mosta which he claims were full of irresponsibly planned and resulted in injuries due to lack of safety procedures. He is currently a candidate for the 2024 European Parliament elections as an independent.

In June 2025, Vassallo and Jacob Gauci Cunningham founded the Christian conservative political organisation National Democratic Union (Maltese: Unjoni Demokratika Nazzjonali (UDM)). Vassallo stressed that the UDM is a political organisation, not a political party. He did not rule out evolving the organisation into a political party in the future.

Vassallo met with PN's newly-elected leader Alex Borg in December 2025 on the latter's invitation. Vassallo stated he witnessed a "renewed energy" by the new party leadership and offered his assistance. He did not rule out contesting a general election with PN again. Vassallo also stated he saw no reason to close down Moviment Solidarjetà despite rejoining PN.

== Electoral history ==
=== European Parliament elections ===
Election	Party	FTP Votes	FTP%	Result / Notes
2024	Independent	712	0.28	Not elected, eliminated on Count 21, 902 votes

=== General elections ===
Party	Election	District/s Contested (Note: Maltese electoral law permits that a candidate contests a maximum of a seat in two different districts.)	FTP Votes	FTP% (Note: Percentage of district, not nationally.)	Result / Notes
Partit Nazzjonalista	1996	Unknown, no clear data			Elected
Partit Nazzjonalista	1998	Unknown, no clear data			Elected
Partit Nazzjonalista	2003	Unknown, no clear data			Elected
Partit Nazzjonalista	2008	District 7	755	3.2%	Not elected
Partit Nazzjonalista	2008	District 11	2047	9%	Not elected
Partit Nazzjonalista	2008 casual elections	Co-opted			
Partit Nazzjonalista	2013	District 7	438	1.8%	Not elected
Partit Nazzjonalista	2013	District 11	1263	5.1%	Initially not elected due to mistake by electoral commission, as later ruled by the Constitutional Court.
Partit Nazzjonalista	2017	District 7	256	1%	Not elected
Partit Nazzjonalista	2017	District 11	438	1.8%	Elected on the 22nd count
Partit Nazzjonalista	2022	District 7	490	2%	Not elected
Partit Nazzjonalista	2022	District 11	371	1.5%	Not elected

=== Local elections ===
Party	Election	Local Council Contested	FTP Votes	FTP %	Position	Result / Notes
Partit Nazzjonalista	2015	Mosta	2774	21%	1st	Elected as Councillor, and subsequently as Mayor

== Personal life ==
Edwin Vassallo is married to Caroline, with whom he has 2 sons. The family resides in Mosta.

Vassallo is a Catholic and his opposition to, and the nay vote to the Marriage Equality Act, were inspired from these beliefs.

== See also ==
- List of members of the parliament of Malta, 2017–2022
