= Anthony Agius Decelis =

Maltese politician

Parliamentary Secretary for Persons with Disability and Active Ageing
- In office 9 June 2017 – 15 January 2020
- Prime Minister: Joseph Muscat; Robert Abela
- Preceded by: Justyne Caruana
- Succeeded by: Silvio Parnis

Member of Parliament
- In office 10 May 2008 – 20 February 2022
- Constituency: Eleventh District
- Incumbent
- Assumed office 20 June 2026

Mosta Local Councillor & Minority leader
- In office 1 July 2024 – 20 June 2026

Personal details
- Born: 24 October 1967 (age 58)
- Party: Partit Laburista
- Other political affiliations: European Alliance for Freedom
- Spouse: Josette
- Children: 3
- Education: University of Malta (BA, M.Sc)
- Occupation: Politician; gerontologist

Anthony Agius Decelis (born 24 October 1967) is a Maltese politician and gerontologist from the Labour Party. He served as a member of the Parliament of Malta for the Eleventh District from 2008 to 2022.

== Education ==
Agius Decelis graduated from the University of Malta with a Bachelor's of Arts in Youth and Community Studies in Informal Education, a Post Graduate Diploma in Health Management and a Master’s degree in Gerontology & Geriatrics.

== Career ==
In 2017, he was appointed parliamentary secretary for active ageing and persons with disability. In 2020 he was replaced by Silvio Parnis.

In 2020, he was appointed chair of the Grand Harbour Regeneration Corporation.

== Personal life ==
Agius Decelis is married to Josette and the couple have 3 daughters together; Danika, Anne Marie and Jeanine.

His daughter Danika Camilleri Agius Decelis is a senior pharmacist at the Malta Medicines Authority.

== See also ==
- List of members of the parliament of Malta, 2008–2013
- List of members of the parliament of Malta, 2013–2017
- List of members of the parliament of Malta, 2017–2022
