= Ian Castaldi Paris =

Maltese politician

Ian Castaldi Paris is a Maltese politician from the Labour Party who served as a member of the Parliament of Malta.

== Political career ==
Castaldi Paris was elected in a casual election in District 8 in May 2020. In December 2020, he was fined over 300,000 euros for tax issues. As a result, he was removed from the public accounts committee. He was replaced by Jonathan Attard. He stood down at the 2022 Maltese general election.

== See also ==
- List of members of the parliament of Malta, 2017–2022
