= Daniel Micallef =

Maltese diplomat and politician (1928–2022)

Representative of Malta at the Parliamentary Assembly of the Council of Europe
- In office 25 September 1985 – 1 September 1986

Speaker of the House of Representatives of Malta
- In office February 1982 – July 1986
- Preceded by: Kalcidon Agius
- Succeeded by: Paul Xuereb

Personal details
- Born: 8 June 1928 Rabat, Crown Colony of Malta
- Died: 9 December 2022 (aged 94)
- Party: Christian Workers' (until 1966); Labour (since 1966)
- Occupation: Diplomat

Daniel Micallef (8 June 1928 – 9 December 2022) was a Maltese doctor, politician, and diplomat.

He served as Speaker of the House of Representatives from 1982 to 1986, was a long-standing Member of Parliament, briefly served as Minister of Education, Culture and the Environment, and later represented Malta as Ambassador to the Holy See and to the Sovereign Military Order of Malta. He also .

== Early life and professional career ==
Micallef was born in Rabat, Malta on 8 June 1928. He trained as a medical doctor and practised as a general practitioner.

== Political career ==
Micallef was first elected to the Parliament in 1962 as a candidate for the Christian Workers' Party. He resigned in 1966 and later joined the Labour Party, being re-elected in 1971, 1976, 1981, and 1987.

In February 1982, Micallef was elected Speaker of the House of Representatives. His tenure coincided with the constitutional crisis following the 1981 Maltese general election, when the Nationalist Party boycotted Parliament.

He served as Speaker until July 1986 and represented Malta at the Parliamentary Assembly of the Council of Europe from 1985 to 1986.

Following his Speakership, Micallef became Minister of Education, Culture and the Environment in 1986, serving until the Labour Party’s defeat in the 1987 general election. During this period he focused on environmental issues and was respected by environmental groups.

After the 1987 election, he continued in opposition as the Labour Party’s spokesperson on education and environmental affairs.

With the return to government of the Labour Party in 1996, Micallef was briefly appointed as ambassador. He served from January 1997 till 1999 in Rome, as Ambassador of Malta to the Holy See and to the Sovereign Military Order of Malta.

== Personal life and legacy ==
Micallef married Pauline Farrugia; they had seven children.

Daniel Micallef died on 9 December 2022, aged 94, in Rabat, Malta. Micallef was widely regarded as a moderate voice in Maltese politics during polarised decades.
