= Malta Information Technology Agency =

Agency overview
- Formed: 1990
- Preceding agencies: Malta Information Technology and Training Services Ltd. (MITTS Ltd.); Management Systems Unit Ltd (MSU Ltd.)
- Jurisdiction: Government of Malta
- Headquarters: Gattard House, National Road, Blata l-Bajda, HMR9010, Malta
- Motto: To be the Digital Leader for the Government of Malta
- Agency executive: Emmanuel Darmanin, Chief Executive Officer
- Parent department: Office of the Prime Minister
- Website: www.mita.gov.mt

The Malta Information Technology Agency (Abbreviation: MITA) is a Maltese government agency under the Office of the Prime Minister. MITA manages the implementation of IT programmes in Government to enhance public service delivery and provides the infrastructure needed to execute ICT services to Government. MITA is also responsible to propagate further use of ICT in society and economy and to promote and deliver programmes to enhance ICT education and the use of ICT as a learning tool.

== History ==
=== 1990-1996: Management Systems Unit Limited ===
It was formed by the Maltese government in 1990 as the Management Systems Unit Ltd (MSU) as part of the reform of public services.

=== 1997-2008: Malta Information Technology and Training Services Limited ===
In 1997, MSU changed its name and role to Malta Information Technology and Training Services Limited. It was focused on providing IT and training services.

=== 2009-present: Malta Information Technology Agency ===
MITA was established in 2009 into a more wider organisation looking at the application of ICTs across all sectors of society and the economy.

== National Strategies ==
=== Malta: The Smart Island Strategy (2008-2010) ===
The Minister for Investment, Industry and Information Technology, launched The Smart Island – the National ICT Strategy for Malta 2008-2010 in December 2007. The strategy set the vision of Malta to become one of the top 10 information societies in the world by 2010. The new strategy sought to proactively address several major challenges including: the new digital divides; the successful application of technologies in the enhancement of quality of life; and the constantly moving target of becoming (and remaining) a leading ICT industry in the region.

=== Digital Malta Strategy (2014-2020) ===
In 2013, MITA drew up a national strategy for the digital economy. On 24 March 2014, the Digital Malta – the National Digital Strategy for 2014-2020 was launched by the Prime Minister Hon Dr. Joseph Muscat. Digital Malta puts forward a set of guiding principles and policy actions of how ICT can be used for socio-economic development. It sets out a path how ICT can be applied to different sectors of the economy and society, and how citizens and businesses can benefit from its application.

On 15 May 2014, the Prime Minister Hon. Dr Joseph Muscat inaugurated MITA Innovation Hub SmartCity Malta, an Internet-enabled office environment which students, web innovators, software developers and start-ups can use to develop proof-of-concept projects supported by mentors from the industry, as well as by software tools and other resources made available by world players from the ICT industry.

The Digital Economy and Society Index (DESI) published by the European Commission in early 2016, placed Malta in the ‘running ahead’ cluster of EU countries, and confirmed that Malta is among the ‘fastest growing’ digital economies in the EU. Furthermore, Malta has been reconfirmed as leader in the delivery and performance of eGovernment services amongst 34 countries (28 European Union member states together with Iceland, Norway, Serbia, Switzerland, Turkey and Montenegro). The results were published in the eGovernment Benchmark Report 2016 issued in October 2016 by the European Commission.

=== Malta Cyber Security Strategy (2016) ===
After a green paper and numerous consultation sessions with businesses and the general public, on 23 September 2016, the Minister for Competitiveness and Digital, Maritime and Services Economy launched the first national Cyber Security Strategy. Articulated by MITA, the Strategy calls for a number of actions covering various economic, societal and cultural dimensions, on the basis that cyber security is a technical and behavioural concern impacting upon Government, business and citizens.

Within this context, on 27 January 2017, the Minister, in collaboration with the Steering Committee responsible for the Strategy implementation has launched a two-year National Cyber Awareness Campaign as one of the Strategy’s initial priority areas. The Campaign ‘Sigurta’ Onlajn Għalik’ aims to cover the online security interests of the public sector, the citizen as well as the private sector, giving also particular attention to the SMEs which, as within the EU, constitute the majority of the Maltese economy.

=== Government mServices Strategy (2017-2018) ===
On 21 November 2016, the Principal Permanent Secretary launched the Government mServices Strategy for 2017-2018. This strategy was articulated by MITA following a number of consultation sessions with the public as well as the launch of a green paper. This strategy puts forward the Government's plans for the provision of public services over mobile devices for 2017 and 2018 and is another building block in the achievement of the ultimate vision of providing access to 24x7 public services from anywhere. The launch of the strategy was accompanied by the soft launch of a number of mobile applications which were made available to dedicated focus groups for beta testing
