= Ivan Bartolo =

Maltese politician

Ivan Bartolo MP

Member of the Parliament of Malta for District 11
- Incumbent
- Assumed office 2022

Personal details
- Party: Nationalist

Ivan Bartolo is a Maltese politician from the Nationalist Party. He was elected to the Parliament of Malta in the 2022 Maltese general election from District 11. He was mayor of Mosta from 2016 to 2017.

== See also ==
- List of members of the parliament of Malta, 2022–2027
