= David Agius =

Maltese politician

Honourable David Agius MP
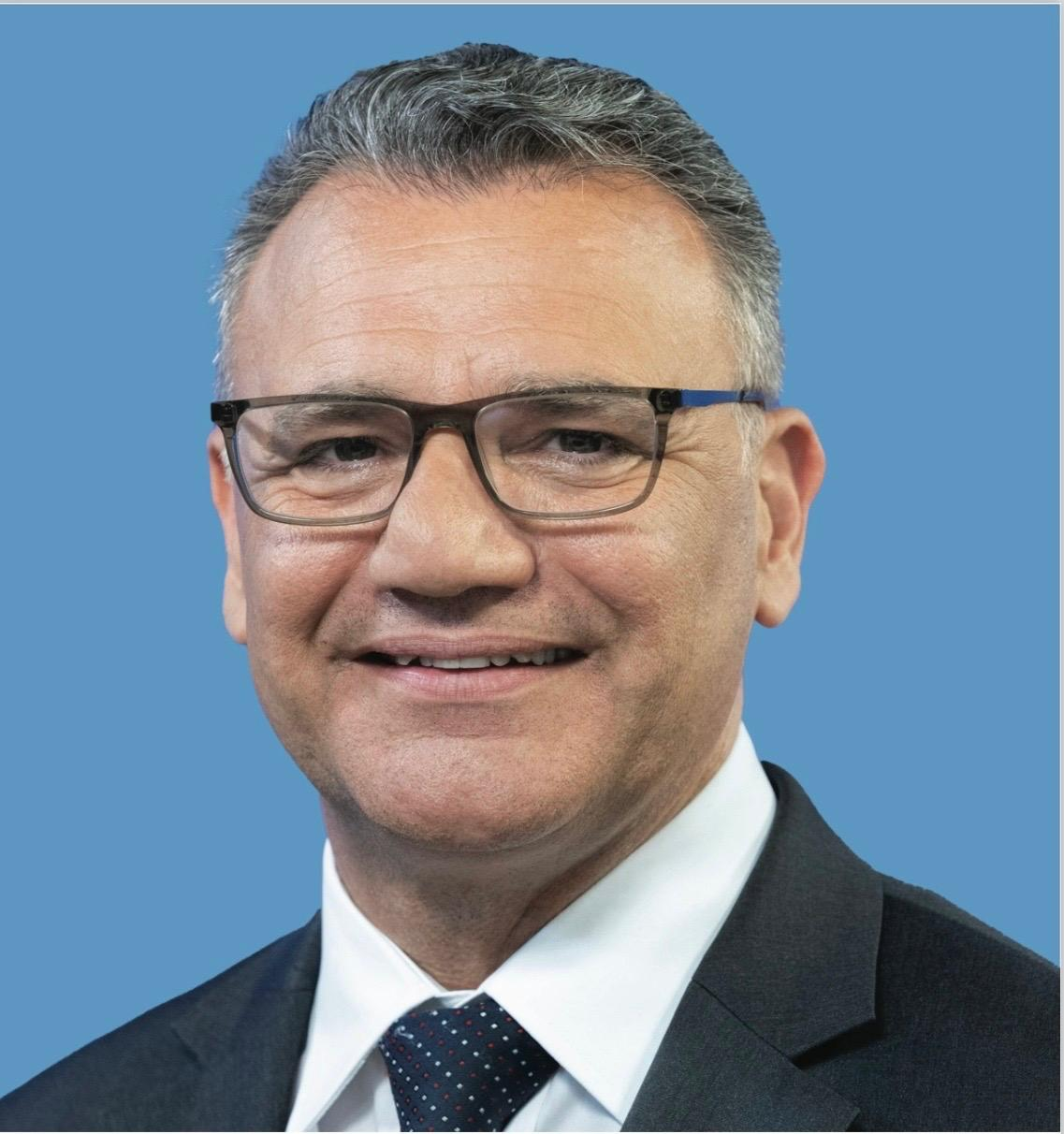
- Agius in 2026

Deputy Speaker of the House of Representatives of Malta
- Incumbent
- Assumed office 2022
- President: Myriam Spiteri Debono
- Prime Minister: Robert Abela
- Preceded by: Claudette Pace

Member of Parliament
- Incumbent
- Assumed office 24 May 2003
- Constituency: Seventh District (2003-2008); Eighth District (2017-2022); Eleventh District (2008-2017; 2022-Present)

Personal details
- Born: 18 November 1968 (age 57)
- Party: Nationalist Party
- Spouse: Debbie Agius
- Website: davidagius.org

David Agius (born 18 November 1968) is a Maltese politician of the Nationalist Party. He has served as a Member of Parliament since 2003 and has been Deputy Speaker of the House of Representatives of Malta since 2022. He also serves as Shadow Minister for Sport and Volunteering and as Vice President of the European Union of Christian Democratic Workers.

== Biography ==
=== Early life ===
Agius's father, Twanny Agius, served as the president of the Maltese Amateur Football Association.

In his youth, Agius entered politics when he re-established the Students Representative Council in 1986 during his years in secondary education. He was also elected president of the SDM (Maltese Christian Democrat Students).

Agius studied economics and management at the University of Malta.

Agius joined the youth organisation of the Nationalist Party (the MZPN) in 1991. He initially served as a sports journalist at Radio101. Agius would later host Radiopoli, a political radio programme for seven years. He has also hosted morning shows on Radio101 and Smash Radio.

=== Political career ===
Agius was first elected to the Attard local council in 2001.

In 2003, Agius was elected to the Parliament of Malta, and has since served continuously for over two decades.

In the general elections of 2008, he was re-elected as a Member of Parliament as a representative of the 11th district. During the legislature 2008-2013, he held the post of the Government Whip.

After being re-elected again in 2013, he served as the Opposition Whip.

Agius was re-elected for the fourth consecutive term as a Member of Parliament in 2017 and served as the representative for the 8th district. He once again served as the Opposition Whip. During a shakeup of the leadership of the Nationalist Party, Agius was elected by his party as the deputy leader for parliamentary affairs. Agius was also appointed as the Spokesperson for Civil Liberties of the Nationalist Party. During his term, he protested the terminology in the 2017 amendments to the Maltese Marriage Act that legalized same-sex marriage in Malta. Agius claimed the bill would prevent Maltese citizens from celebrating Mother's Day.

In 2022, Agius was re-elected for a fifth consecutive term as a Member of Parliament. He was then appointed Deputy Speaker of the House of Representatives of Malta, a role in which he presides over parliamentary sittings and oversees parliamentary procedure. He was also appointed to the shadow cabinet by Alex Borg as the Shadow Minister for Sport and Volunteering. In this capacity, Agius has advocated for greater investment in sporting infrastructure, increased support for sports federations and clubs, and recognition of the role played by voluntary organisations in Maltese society.

Agius was elected as the vice-president of the European Union of Christian Democratic Workers in 2023.

Agius stood as a candidate for the 2024 European Parliament election for the Nationalist Party.

Agius also serves as the Opposition Spokesperson for EU Funds, advocating for strategic investment in sports infrastructure and youth development.

== Personal life ==
Agius married his wife Debbie in 1996. They have two daughters, Davinia and Desiree. Outside of politics, he is known for his involvement in local community events and sports initiatives.

== See also ==
- List of members of the parliament of Malta, 2017–2022
- List of members of the parliament of Malta, 2022–2027
