= Alex Muscat (politician) =

Maltese economist and politician

Honourable Alex Muscat MP

Member of Parliament
- Incumbent
- Assumed office 2017

Deputy Head of Secretariat
- In office March 2013 – January 2020

Personal details
- Party: Labour Party
- Education: J. F. Abela Junior College, University of Malta

Alex Muscat is a Maltese economist and politician currently serving as the Member of Parliament in the Parliament of Malta from District 11 since 2022. He climbed to the peak of Mount Kilimanjaro to support Puttinu Cares, a Maltese cancer charity.

He was born in Mosta.
