= Claudio Grech =

Maltese Politician with Nationalist Party

Claudio Grech (born 2 August 1974) is a Maltese politician with the Nationalist Party.

== Biography ==
Grech's political career began within the private secretariat of former PN Minister Austin Gatt. He was often referred to as Gatt's right-hand man, and Gatt later testified that Grech was also in charge of his campaign in the run-up to the 2008 general elections, although Grech refuted this claim.

Grech was appointed CEO of SmartCity Malta in 2008; he resigned in 2009. He was later appointed Chairman of Malta Information Technology Agency (MITA) and resigned in 2011 in the wake of allegations by the Labour opposition that his position granted him access to private citizens' data that was incompatible with his role within the Nationalist Party. These claims led to an investigation by the Data Protection Commissioner, which found that Grech had no access to citizens' personal information. Grech also served as CEO for Polidano Brothers, a company owned by construction magnate Charles Polidano.

Grech was first elected to the Maltese Parliament at the 2013 elections and again in 2017. During his parliamentary career, he has served as the shadow minister for health, the family and the economy, and has come to be seen as the party's chief ideologue. In 2021 he was appointed PN spokesperson for political renewal, research and development, and given the responsibility for drafting the party's electoral manifesto.

Grech is considered a moderate voice within the Nationalist Party and has frequently been tipped as a potential leader for the party. Grech is also known to hold socially conservative views and is believed to have been heavily involved in the Nationalist Party's campaign against the introduction of divorce at the 2011 referendum. He is also known to hold anti-abortion views, having proposed amendments to the Child Protection Act which would include the foetus in the legal definition of a minor. Grech's private Foundation has supported the Life Network Malta Foundation, an anti-abortion organisation based in Malta.

Grech is believed to be Malta's wealthiest MP, with an analysis of his asset declarations finding that he held a net position of €841,954 in 2021.

Grech, together with his wife, is the founder of the Save A Life Foundation, a voluntary organisation carrying out community work with children and youths. Grech is known to donate his entire parliamentary income to the Foundation.
