= Kristy Debono =

Maltese politician

Kristy Debono is a Maltese economist. She is a former Maltese politician and ex-member of the Parliament for District 9 where she was elected on 2013 and re-elected on 2017. In 2017, she exceeded her quota on first count votes making her the only female member of parliament to get elected as such. She formed part of the Nationalist Party. On 5 November 2017, she was elected president of the General Council of the Nationalist Party.

During her two legislatures in Parliament, Kristy Debono was appointed Opposition spokesperson for the Economy and Financial Services. She also served as Governor in the Lands Authority Board of Governors on behalf of the Opposition. During her tenure, she was also appointed member of the Public Accounts Committee and the Economic and Financial Affairs Parliamentary Committee.

In a social media post on 21 February 2022, she announced that she was leaving politics in order to focus her life towards her family.

Kristy Debono is married to Jean Pierre Debono, who also got elected as a Member of Parliament during the 2017 General elections. They have one daughter.
