= Toni Bezzina =

Maltese politician

Toni Bezzina is a Maltese politician from the Nationalist Party. He was elected to the Parliament of Malta in the general election held in 2013 and in all subsequent elections held. .

In 2021, Bezzina was cleared by a police investigation into alleged corruption dating back to 2012. In 2017, he was a candidate for deputy leader of the Nationalist Party.

== See also ==
- List of members of the parliament of Malta, 2022–2027
