= Agostino Bonello =

Maltese television presenter, film producer and art director (born 1949)

- Born: August 11, 1949 (age 77); Valletta, Malta
- Other name: Ino Bonello
- Occupations: Film producer, art director, production designer

Agostino "Ino" Bonello (born 11 August 1949) is a Maltese production designer and art director whose career has included work in film, television, theatre and large-scale public events. He has also worked as a television presenter and producer and has served in local government.

== Early life and artistic background ==
Bonello was born into a family with a longstanding involvement in the visual arts and artistic craftsmanship. His grandfather, Giovanni Bonello (1860–1920), was a Maltese painter and decorator who worked on churches and cathedrals in Malta. His documented work included the design of the umbrellun at St Dominic's Basilica in Valletta and large coloured-watercolour views in the corridor of the Armoury at the President's Palace.

His father, Carmelo Bonello, was a picture restorer. His restoration work included a major intervention on the titular painting of Ta' Pinu in preparation for its coronation ceremony in 1935.

His paternal uncle, Vincenzo Bonello, was an art critic, restorer, museum curator and historian. He served as Curator of the Fine Arts Section of Malta's Museums Department and was closely involved in the development of Malta's national art collections.

Bonello studied at the Malta School of Art and subsequently worked as an architectural draughtsman and detailer. He also undertook an assignment at Brega, Libya, working for Esso and Holmes & Narver.

== Early television and broadcasting ==
Bonello became involved in Maltese television at a young age and subsequently worked as a presenter and producer. During the 1970s he participated in programmes aimed at children and young people, including Tuffieħa.

He also produced and presented television programmes dealing with arts, crafts and other subjects. He participated in radio broadcasting as well as television.

== Mediterranean Film Studios ==
Bonello subsequently joined Mediterranean Film Studios, where he held a number of managerial positions, including Production Manager, Manager of Operations and Chief Executive. In 1987 he was appointed Studio Manager.

In 1994 he began working independently through IBA Studios, providing production and art-department services for local and international film and television productions.

== Film and television ==
Bonello worked as an art director on the television miniseries Helen of Troy (2003), for which he received an Art Directors Guild nomination for Excellence in Production Design.

He was credited as art director for the Malta unit of Steven Spielberg's Munich (2005). The American Film Institute's catalogue also credits him as art director on A Previous Engagement (2008).

In Saul: The Journey to Damascus (2014), actor John Rhys-Davies described Bonello as being in charge of production and costume design and referred to his ability to transform a single set into different locations.

His subsequent credits have included work in the art department on productions including Risen (2016), Paul, Apostle of Christ (2018), Thugs of Hindostan (2018) and The Invisible Boy: Second Generation (2018).

== Public events and historical productions ==
Alongside film and television, Bonello has worked on large-scale public events and historical presentations in Malta.

In December 2008, he was the artistic director and scenographer of a large live Nativity production staged in the ruins of the Royal Opera House in Valletta. The production attracted approximately 80,000 visitors between 12 December and Christmas Eve. The Times of Malta reported that the production used the architecture of the ruined Opera House as part of the setting and involved more than 40 actors, craftsmen and live animals.

== George Cross commemorations ==
Bonello was involved in the George Cross commemorations organised by the Malta Tourism Authority in Valletta.

In 2009, the Times of Malta reported that Bonello would direct the commemorative presentation, which combined historical photographs, narration and approximately 50 re-enactors, accompanied by the Malta Police Band, the Mounted Police and a unit of the Armed Forces of Malta. The script was written by George Peresso. The Malta Independent likewise identified Bonello as director of the event.

The commemorations continued in subsequent years as audiovisual presentations and live re-enactments in St George's Square. A University of Malta announcement in 2017 stated that the Malta Tourism Authority had organised the George Cross commemorations for the preceding decade, using live re-enactment and narrative son et lumière presentations.

== Theatre and scenography ==
Bonello has also worked in theatre and live performance.

A 2015 Times of Malta review of Mario Philip Azzopardi's production Ix-Xitan Kunjomu Malti described the set by Bonello as a prominent element of the production.

In 2018 he was credited as set designer for the Teatru Malta production Il-Madonna Tiegħi Aħjar Minn Tiegħek, staged at the Teatru Parrokkjali in Birgu.

Earlier cultural work included stage management and artistic direction. A University of Malta programme for the 1995 Mediterranean Evening identifies Bonello as Stage Manager, while the programme for the 2000 Verdi Spectacular identifies him as Artistic Director of a costume exhibition.

== Local government ==
Bonello was elected as a councillor on the first Paola Local Council in 1994. The official Paola Local Council record of the first legislature lists him among the elected councillors.

He subsequently served as Mayor of Paola from 1996 to 1999.

== Later work and recognition ==
Bonello continued to work on international film productions filmed in Malta.

For the feature film The Boat (2018), he was credited as Production Designer by the British Council's UK Films Database.

The Boat was nominated for Best Production Design at the 2022 Malta Film Awards, with Bonello named in the nomination. At the same awards, he received the Crew Recognition Award.

In 2025, Bonello was credited as Senior Art Director on Gladiator II, which was nominated for Excellence in Production Design, Period Feature Film at the 29th Art Directors Guild Awards.

== Teaching and lectures ==
Bonello has shared his experience of filmmaking and production design through lectures and public presentations.

The University of Malta's University of the Third Age programme for 2025–26 lists Bonello as lecturer for a course entitled Various Aspects of Film and Filmmaking, covering subjects including filmmaking, the role of the art department in creating cinematic worlds, storytelling and Malta's relationship with film.

The University of Malta's audiovisual archive also includes programmes featuring Bonello discussing his artistic work and the film industry in Malta.

== Selected filmography ==
Year	Production	Credit
2003	Helen of Troy	Art Director
2005	Munich	Art Director, Malta Unit
2008	A Previous Engagement	Art Director
2016	Risen	Art Department
2018	Paul, Apostle of Christ	Art Director
2018	The Boat	Production Designer
2018	Thugs of Hindostan	Supervising Art Director
2018	The Invisible Boy: Second Generation	Art Director
2025	Gladiator II	Senior Art Director

== Awards and nominations ==
- Art Directors Guild Award nomination, Helen of Troy, Excellence in Production Design, 2004.
- Malta Film Awards, Best Production Design nomination for The Boat, 2022.
- Malta Film Awards Crew Recognition Award, 2022.
- Art Directors Guild Award nomination, Gladiator II, Senior Art Director, Excellence in Production Design, Period Feature Film, 2025.
