= Marthese Portelli =

Maltese lawyer and politician

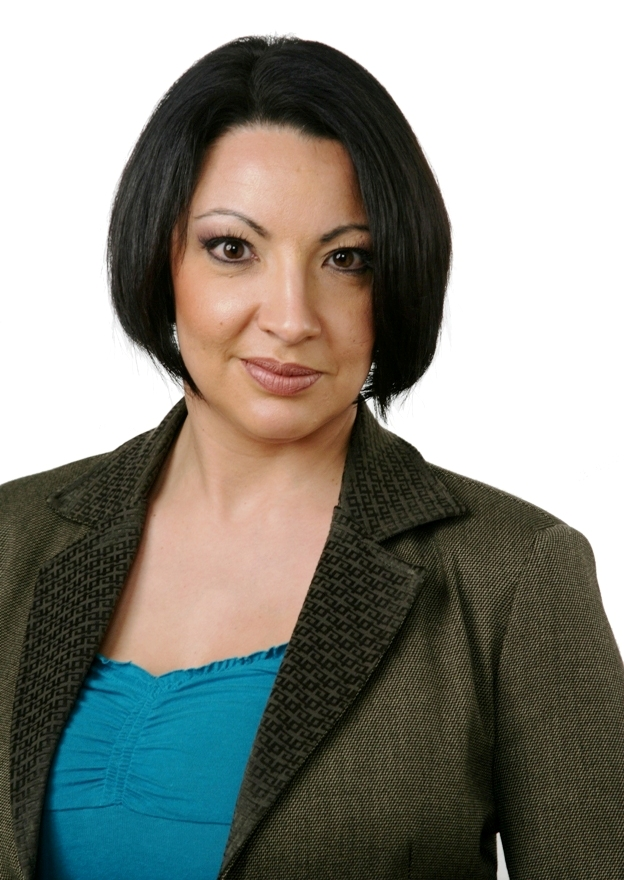
Marthese Portelli

Marthese Portelli is a Maltese lawyer and former politician.

== Biography ==
Portelli graduated in Law from the University of Malta and obtained a lawyer's warrant.

Portelli was a member of Parliament for District 9, where she was elected in 2013 and re-elected in 2017. She forms part of the Nationalist Party. She also unsuccessfully contested 2009 European Parliament Election in Malta on the Nationalist Party ticket. She was twice elected as the president of the Nationalist Party Executive Committee and was the first woman to hold this role.

Portelli left politics in February 2020. Since June 2021, she is CEO of the Malta Chamber of Commerce.
