= Clyde Puli =

Maltese politician (born 1969)

The Honourable Clyde Puli MP

Parliamentary Secretary of Youth and Sport
- In office 12 March 2008 – 10 March 2013
- Prime Minister: Lawrence Gonzi

Personal details
- Born: 13 September 1969 (age 56) Qormi, Malta
- Party: Nationalist Party
- Spouse(s): Maryanne; 2 children

Clyde Puli (born 13 September 1969) is a Maltese Member of Parliament with the Nationalist Party, holding the position of Spokesperson for Family and Social Solidarity in the Opposition Shadow Cabinet. He is a former Maltese Parliamentary Secretary of Youth and Sport.

== Education ==
Puli studied sociology and communications and, later, political sociology at the University of Malta. He is a member of the Malta Institute of Management, the UK Chartered Institute of Public Relations and the European Sociological Association.

== Political life ==
Puli was first elected to public office in 1994 as Local Councillor in Qormi. He served a term as Mayor (1998–2001) and was re-elected councillor in 2001 until 2003 when he resigned to take up his Parliamentary seat.

In 1997 he was elected President of the Nationalist Party’s College of Councillors through which he was appointed ex ufficio member of the Party's Administrative, Executive and General Councils.

In 2003 he was elected for the first time to Parliament and in the subsequent elections in 2008 and 2013. He served as Parliamentary Secretary for Youth and Sport in the Ministry of Education and Culture (2008-2013), Chairman of the Standing Committee on Social Affairs (2004-2008), member of the Standing Committee on Foreign and European Affairs (2003-2004) and member of the National Council for Children (2005-2008).
