= Rosianne Cutajar =

Maltese politician (born 1988)

Honourable Rosianne Cutajar MP
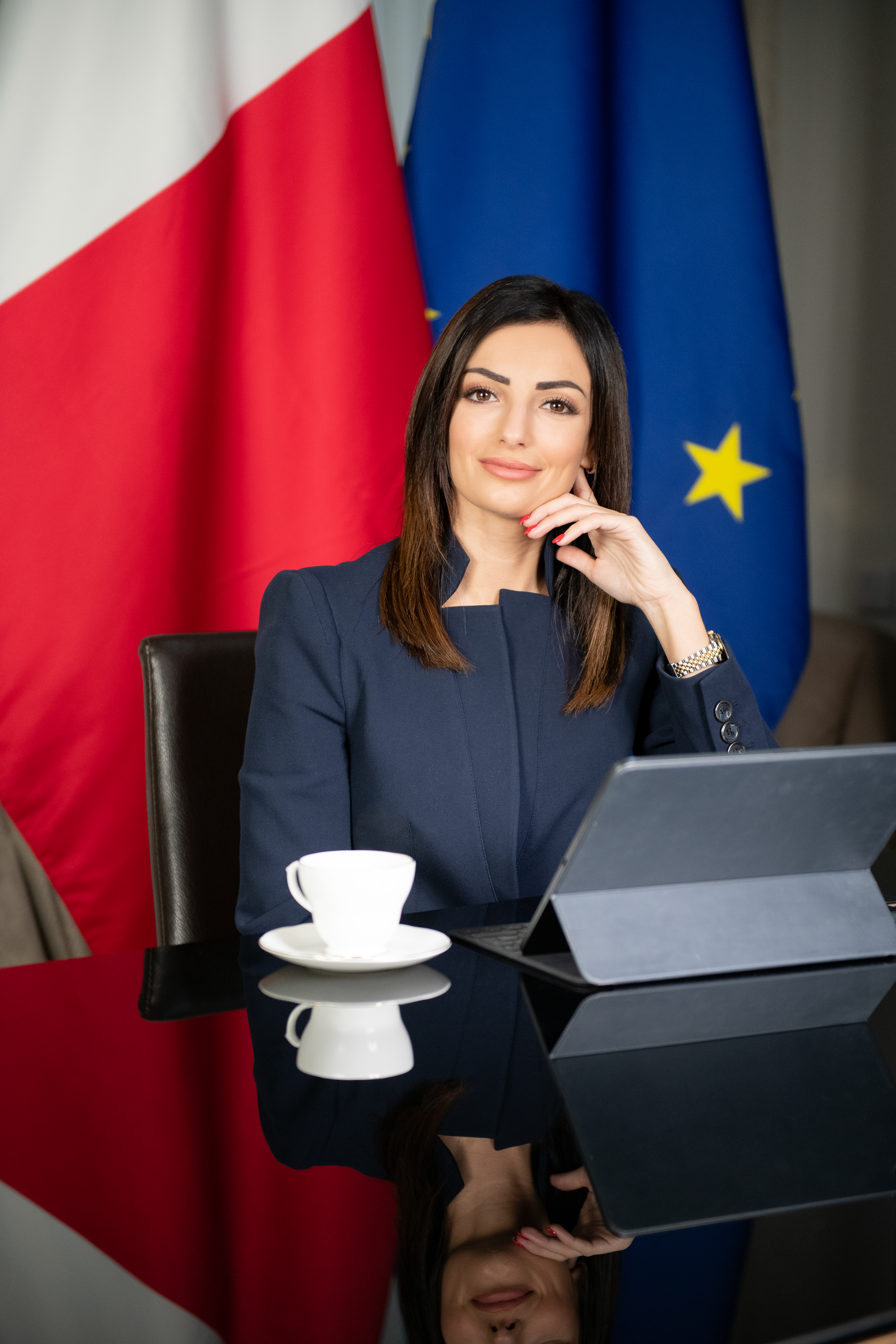
- Official portrait, 2017

Minister for Equality and Civil Rights
- Incumbent
- Assumed office 4 June 2026
- Preceded by: Office Established

Parliamentary Secretary for Civil Rights and Reforms
- In office 23 November 2020 – 25 February 2021

Mayor of Qormi
- In office 2012–2017
- Preceded by: Jesmond Aquilina
- Succeeded by: Jesmond Aquilina

Member of Parliament
- Incumbent
- Assumed office 20 June 2017

Parliamentary Secretary for Equality and Reforms
- In office 15 January 2020 – 23 November 2020

Personal details
- Born: September 4, 1988 (age 38) Pietà, Malta
- Party: Labour (2024-Current)
- Other political affiliations: Labour (2012- 2023) Independent (2023-2024)
- Domestic partner: Daniel Farrugia (2019–present)
- Children: 1
- Education: University of Malta

Rosianne Cutajar MP (born 4 September 1988) is a Maltese politician who is a member of the Labour Party. She is a member of the Parliament of Malta representing the Sixth District electoral division. Cutajar was Parliamentary Secretary for Civil Rights and Reforms within the Ministry for Justice, Equality and Governance. As a junior minister within Prime Minister Robert Abela’s government, she was responsible for Malta’s equality and civil rights policy and its implementation, together with the country’s legislative reforms across various sectors of government. Cutajar resigned from her position as parliamentary secretary in February 2021 after calls for her resignation due to links with murder suspect Yorgen Fenech.

Cutajar also resigned from the Labour Party following the leaking of intimate chat transcripts between her and businessman Yorgen Fenech. She continued to serve as an independent MP before getting reinstated into the Labour Party.

In 2026, Cutajar was appointed Minister for Equality and Civil Rights after the Maltese Labour Party won it fourth consecutive General Election in May 2026.

== Education ==
Cutajar attended the Qormi Primary School, going on to the Maria Assunta Girls school in Hamrun for her secondary education. She attended the Giovanni Curmi Higher Secondary School. She graduated with a BA with Honours Degree as well as a Postgraduate Certificate from the University of Malta.

== Political career ==
Elected to Malta's House of Representatives in 2017, Rosianne Cutajar worked on the introduction of legislation for civil rights, gender and equality in Malta, as well as the updating of existing laws. She has spoken out on a number of social, policy and bio-ethical concerns. Cutajar’s portfolio included the drafting of a new equality law which is still currently pending. She was also involved in Malta's Gender Balance Reform, the drafting of Malta’s National Action Plan against Racism and Xenophobia (NAPRAX), the updating of Malta's divorce laws, the securing of financial commitment towards Malta's first-ever LGBTIQ+ Community Hub, as well as securing Malta's winning bid for the hosting of EuroPride 2023. Cutajar worked on IVF legislation, the lowering of the voting age threshold to sixteen, action against domestic abuse, opened up the debate on a regulatory framework for prostitution, as well as working on a reform to decriminalise the responsible personal use of cannabis. Cutajar has also been responsible for the launch of a 24/7 helpline for victims of domestic violence.

In the 2022 elections, Rosianne Cutajar did manage to get elected into parliament while obtaining 2,158 first count votes on the 6th district. She was faced with harsh criticism from the PN party with allegations amounting to tax evasion.

Prior to her election to the Parliament of Malta, she was the first youngest female mayor of Qormi – one of Malta’s largest localities, a position she held for two consecutive terms.

In 2026, Cutajar was appointed Minister for Equality and Civil Rights after the Maltese Labour Party won it fourth consecutive General Election in May 2026.

== Resignation ==
In February 2021, Cutajar resigned from her position as parliamentary secretary, pending an ethics investigation.

The resignation came after a number of reports in local papers that were published throughout February 2021. On the 14th of February the Times of Malta alleged that Cutajar took a €9,000 cut from a €40,000 in cash given to her by Yorgen Fenech as part of a 2019 property deal. Fenech was accused of complicity in the murder of Daphne Caruana Galizia on 30 November 2019. Standards Commissioner George Hyzler had evaluated a complaint about Cutajar's conduct after Times of Malta alleged she was being chased by the seller to repay a €46,500 brokerage fee.

On 21 February 2021, the Times of Malta further alleged that Cutajar had solicited Yorgen Fenech's help for a political survey in her district in 2019. In the same article it was alleged that Fenech promised some money to Cutajar in an exchange that read "I had to give you some money", to which she replied that they could speak about it at a later date. The alleged exchange came just a few weeks before Cutajar criticised a reference to 17 Black (Fenech's company) in a report drawn up by Dutch MP Pieter Omtzigt on journalist Daphne Caruana Galizia's death during a Council of Europe sitting, and 5 months before Fenech was arrested for the assassination of Daphne Caruana Galizia. It was by then known that Yorgen Fenech was the owner of 17 Black, a company that was to pay $2 million into ex-Minister Konrad Mizzi, and the ex-Chief of Staff, Keith Schembri's Panama companies, as revealed by the Panama Papers.

On 4 April 2023, the Times of Malta reported that Rosianne Cutajar resigned from the Labour's parliamentary group. This after the author Mark Camilleri released transcripts of 2,200 chats between herself and Yorgen Fenech, who is awaiting trial for alleged involvement in the murder of Daphne Caruana Galizia. The chats revealed an intimate relationship between the pair at a time when Cutajar was publicly dismissing calls to investigate suspected corruption linked to Fenech. They also confirmed that Fenech gave Cutajar money as part of a property deal and show Cutajar asked Fenech for help on some occasions.

== Personal life ==
Cutajar has been in a relationship with businessman Daniel Farrugia since 2019. Farrugia is owner of The Londoner British Pub chain in Sliema and Smart City and co-owner of Approved Ltd. In March 2023, Cutajar and Farrugia announced they were expecting their first child, a girl. The child was born in July 2023.
