= Ryan Callus =

Maltese politician (born 1983)

Ryan Callus (born 22 June 1983) is a Maltese politician currently serving as a Nationalist MP in the House of Representatives of Malta. He is currently serving as spokesperson for planning and simplification of administrative processes. In March 2012, Callus was elected deputy mayor of the Siggiewi Local Council. He was subsequently elected a Member of Parliament in March 2013, after contesting for the first time the sixth district, including Siggiewi, Hal Luqa and Hal Qormi. He obtained 1595 votes in the first count and elected in the 11th count with 3916 votes. An engineer by profession, having graduated at the University of Malta in 2005, Hon. Callus completed a Private Pilot Licence at the Delta Connection Academy in Florida. In 2008, Callus obtained a Master of Science in project management from the Lancaster University Management School in the United Kingdom.

Callus held a number of voluntary positions, namely that of president of the University Engineering Student Association (UESA), chairperson of the 2006 Malta Engineering Excellence Awards and public relations officer of the Chamber of Engineers.

In addition, he served as an executive member of the Moviment Żgħażagħ Partit Nazzjonalista (MŻPN) from 2006 to 2014, and was elected its international secretary in 2010. In May 2011, he was elected vice-president of the Youth of the European People's Party (YEPP), being the first to be elected with 99% of valid votes cast.
