= Silvio Parnis =

Maltese politician (1965–2023)

Honourable Silvio Parnis

Member of Parliament
- In office 24 October 1998 – 20 February 2022

Parliamentary Secretary for Active Ageing and Persons with Disability
- In office 15 January 2020 – 23 November 2020
- Prime Minister: Robert Abela

Parliamentary Secretary for Local Government and Communities
- In office 9 June 2017 – 15 January 2020
- Prime Minister: Joseph Muscat; Robert Abela

Mayor of Paola
- In office 1994–1996
- Succeeded by: Ino Bonello

Personal details
- Born: 19 October 1965 Paola, Malta
- Died: 3 January 2023 (aged 57)
- Party: Labour

Silvio Parnis (19 October 1965 – 3 January 2023) was a Maltese politician of the Labour Party. Parnis served in the Parliament of Malta from 1998 to 2022.

== Biography ==
Parnis was born in Paola to Michael and Doris Caruana. He grew up there. He attended Paola Primary School and his secondary education at St. Elias College in Santa Venera. In 2007 he married Dorianne née Cauchi, with whom he had one son, Jacob.

Parnis worked as a health supervisor and as an assistant social worker to elderly residents at the St. Vincent De Paul Residence.

In 1991 he was bequeathed a small piece of land in St Paul’s Bay by will of a childless elderly couple, as he declared in Parliament in 2006.

While in politics, Parnis was also a television and radio presenter, discussing current and social affairs. In 2006 Parnis presented the radio program Problemi tal-Qalb (Problems of the Heart) on PL-owned One Radio, as well as the television programs M’Intix Waħdek (You are not alone), Kliem u Fatti (Words and Facts), and Forum on Smash Television. He stopped his media engagements after the Party decided that no election candidates should host media shows.

=== Political career ===
From 1994 to 1998, Parnis served as mayor of Paola.

He was then elected member of the Maltese Parliament in 1998, 2003, 2008, 2013 and 2017. He always ran for the 4th electoral district, including Gudja, Paola, Għaxaq, Marsa (Trinity Parish Church area), Santa Luċija, Fgura (Mater Bon Consigli), and Tarxien.

From 2013 to 2017, Parnis advocated for the Paola Square Project and an environmental study on Wied Blandun. Parnis also contributed significantly to other projects such as the university buildings in Bormla (lent out to the Sadeen Group's private American University of Malta) and Inwadar Park. From 2013 to 2017, he also held the role of Chairman of the Committee on Bills.

Following the 2017 elections, Parnis was appointed parliamentary secretary for local government and communities in the last cabinet of Joseph Muscat, and then as parliamentary secretary for active ageing and persons with disabilities in the first Abela cabinet.

Parnis was left out of government in November 2020, following criticism of his inability to respond to the COVID-19 crisis and its impact on public elderly homes, as Malta recorded the second-highest rate of mortality in care homes in Europe. Parnis famously gifted a jam roly-poly slice to all elderly residents with the word "courage" printed on its plastic wrapping.

Parnis announced he would not contest the subsequent 2022 election and that he would "dedicate more time to God and work in favour of life and against abortion". He then took up a job at Infrastructure Malta.

- 1998 – 2003: Member of Parliament (opposition).
- 2003 – 2008: Member of Parliament (opposition), Partit Laburista’s spokesperson for the elderly, prepared the party’s position paper for this sector in conjunction with a team of experts.
- 2008 – 2013: Member of Parliament (opposition), Partit Laburista’s main spokesman for consumer protection. Later on during the legislature, Silvio Parnis served as Labour Party main spokesperson for the sustainable development of the south of Malta.
- 2013 – 2017: Member of Parliament (in government), Chair person of consultative council for the south of Malta.
- 2017 – : Member of Parliament (in government), Chair person of consultative council for the south of Malta.

=== Death ===
Parnis died of cancer on 3 January 2023, at the age of 57.

== Electoral results ==
- 1998 - Ninth Parliament: Elected on: 8 September 1998 with 2,259 first count votes. Quota was 3441 votes. (single transferable vote)
- 2003 - Tenth Parliament: Elected on: 14 April 2003 with 4,157 first count votes. Quota was 3550 votes (single transferable vote)
- 2008 - 2013 Eleventh Parliament: Elected on: 12 March 2008 with 4,890 First count votes.
- 2013 - 2017 Twelfth Parliament: Elected on: 11 March 2013 with 978 first count votes
- 2017 - 2022 Thirteenth Parliament: Elected on: 3 June 2017 with 3,334 first count votes
