= Maria Deguara =

Maltese politician (born 1949)

- Born: Maria Fatima Mallia; September 1949 (age 76); Colony of Malta
- Education: University of Malta
- Occupations: Politician, doctor
- Spouse: Louis Deguara (m. 1978)

Maria Fatima Deguara (born September 1949, née Mallia) is a Maltese politician of the Nationalist Party (Partit Nazzjonalista). She was a member of the Parliament of Malta from 2017 to 2022, representing the District 11 electoral division. She was elected in a "casual election" on 26 June 2017 after the 2017 Maltese general election of 3 June 2017, following the resignation of Simon Busuttil who had been elected for both the Eleventh and Twelfth Districts. She stood for re-election in the 2022 Maltese general election but did not hold the seat.

Deguara qualified in medicine at the University of Malta and has specialised in family medicine. She was elected mayor of Naxxar in 2000.

She married Louis Deguara in 1978. He is also a doctor and politician, and served as Minister of Health in the Maltese Government 2003–08. He was a member of parliament for 30 years but announced in 2011 that he would not stand for re-election.
