= Jason Azzopardi =

Maltese politician (born 1971)

The Honourable Jason Azzopardi MP
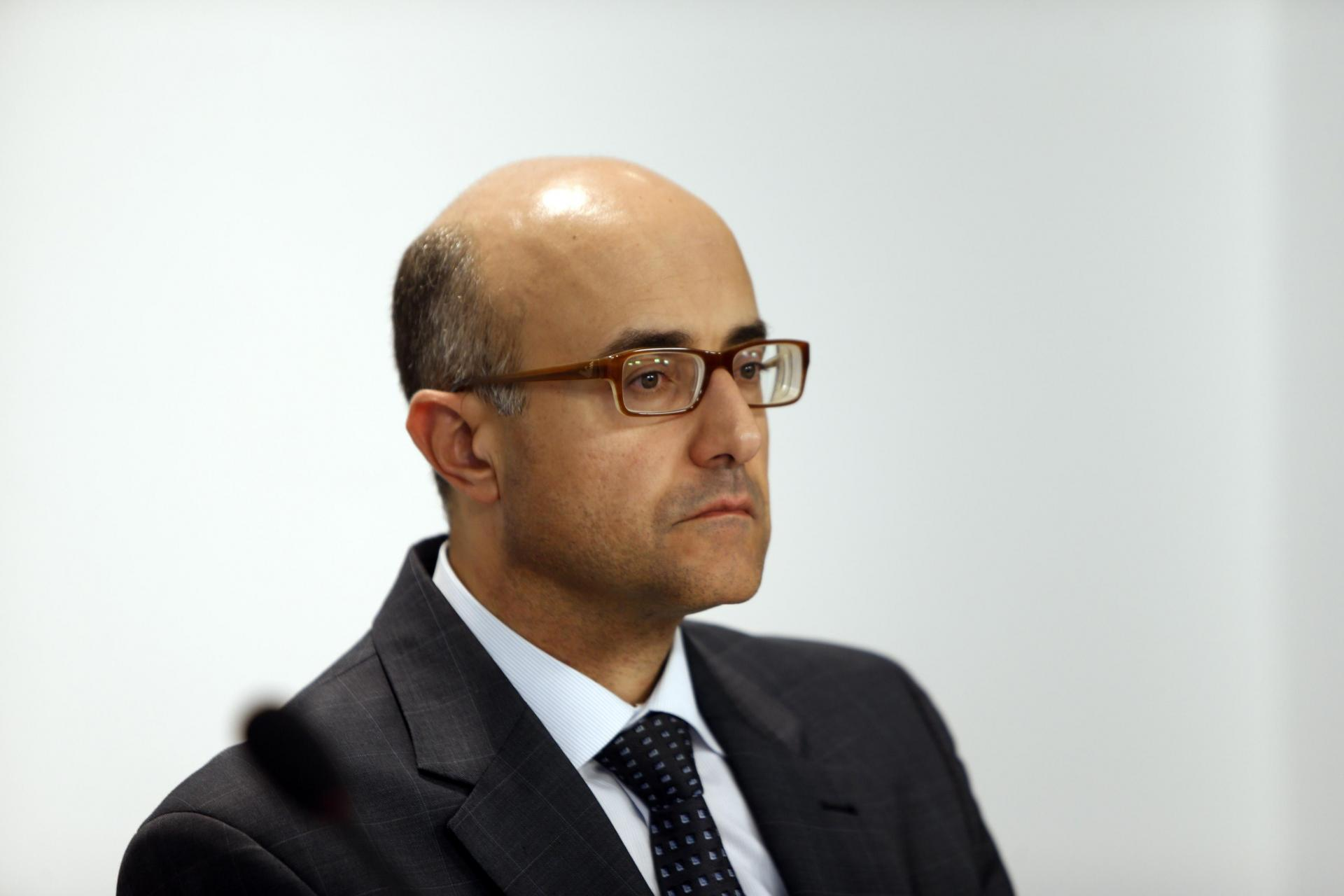

Member of Parliament
- In office 24 October 1998 – 20 February 2022

Personal details
- Born: 1971 (age 54–55)
- Party: Independent
- Other political affiliations: Nationalist Party (until 2022)
- Education: University of Malta

Jason Azzopardi (born 1971, Malta) is a former Maltese politician and lawyer. He graduated as Doctor of Laws with a master's degree in financial services from the University of Malta in 1996 and that year he started practicing as a private criminal lawyer in the courts of Malta.

In the last decade, he has become a fierce critic of the ruling Labour Party where thanks to various sources, he often reveals cases of maladministration and corruption.

== Political career ==
Azzopardi was first elected to the Maltese Parliament in 1998 and subsequently re-elected in 2003, 2008, and 2013, and 2017 as a member of the Maltese Nationalist Party. He also contested the 2022 general election but was not elected and subsequently announced his departure from the Nationalist Party, stating that he was deliberately isolated by the Party.

During the 10th Legislature (2003–2007) he served as chairman of the Foreign and European Affairs Committee, a member of the Privileges Committee, and head of the Maltese delegation to the parliamentary assembly of the OSCE. During the 11th Legislature (2008–2013), he was appointed Parliamentary Secretary for Revenues and Land in the Ministry of Finance, Economy and Investment. He also served in that legislature as Minister for Fair Competition and Small Business and Consumers. He was again re-elected to Parliament in the 12th legislature (2013 elections) but remained in opposition as his party lost the general election.

In the 2008 general elections, he obtained 3321 first count votes and was elected in Parliament after he got the quota of 3679 votes when he inherited second and third option votes from other candidates following the system of single transferable vote. The district which he contested the general elections was the 4th electoral district, composed of the villages of: Gudja, Raħal Ġdid, Ħal Għaxaq, Marsa (Trinity Parish Church area), Santa Luċija, Fgura (Mater Bon Consigli area), and Ħal Tarxien. In the 2013 General Elections, he again obtained a seat in Parliament from the same Electoral District as he obtained 2308 first count votes and managed to get the quota of 3822 votes. Azzopardi failed to get elected in the 2022 General Elections. Jason Azzopardi resigned from the Nationalist Party following a dispute with party leader Bernard Grech over allegations that Grech had lunch with relatives of Yorgen Fenech and that the party received a donation to campaign for a presidential pardon for Fenech. Grech denied the allegations and issued an ultimatum for Azzopardi to substantiate his allegations within 24 hours.

He identifies as a Roman Catholic, guided by this faith's principles in his values as a Member of Parliament. He said he has no regrets in stating his opinion against divorce.

=== Role as Caruana Galizia family lawyer ===
Azzopardi has played a central role in the legal proceedings following the assassination of Daphne Caruana Galizia. He currently represents the Caruana Galizia family and acted as parte civile lawyer in the Daphne Caruana Galizia public inquiry, together with fellow PN MP Therese Comodini Cachia.

Azzopardi has been a vocal critic of the Labour Government's treatment of the inquiry and of its governance prior to and in the wake of Caruana Galizia's assassination. He has made claims linking various Labour Party politicians with Caruana Galizia's assassination or with an alleged cover-up of the murder, including former Prime Minister Joseph Muscat and former Chief of Staff Keith Schembri. He has also made claims linking former Minister Chris Cardona and sitting Minister Carmelo Abela to a 2010 bank heist. Muscat, Schembri, Cardona and Abela have all refuted these claims.

=== Criticism of Adrian Delia ===
Azzopardi has also been a vocal critic of former PN leader Adrian Delia, whom he described as a "Trojan horse" for the Labour Party and of exchanging hundreds of messages with businessman Yorgen Fenech, who stands accused of the murder of Caruana Galizia. Although Delia denied these allegations and accused Azzopardi of spreading "defamatory and false allegations", Azzopardi stood by his claims.

In 2021, Azzopardi and Delia both signed a shared statement recognising each other "as committed MPs in the fight against corruption brought about by the Labour administration". In this joint statement, Azzopardi stated that "Delia was not in any businessman's pocket and he fought against corruption without hindrance or compromise" and that "it did not result to him that hundreds of messages had been exchanged between Delia and Yorgen Fenech". Likewise, Delia recognised "the leading role being played by Azzopardi against corruption cases, at personal risk to himself".
