= Karol Aquilina =

Maltese politician and lawyer

- Born: October 31, 1979 (age 46)
- Education: University of Malta
- Occupations: Lawyer, Politician

Karol Aquilina (born 31 October 1979) is a Maltese politician and lawyer currently serving as a Member of Parliament.

== Biography ==
Aquilina studied at St Aloysius College and graduated as Doctor of Laws from the University of Malta (2004) with a thesis titled “The Principle of Equality of Arms in Maltese Criminal Law” in which Aquilina provides a detailed examination of the principle of equality of arms as part of the general right to a fair trial as guaranteed by section 39 of the Maltese Constitution and Article 6 of the European Convention on Human Rights.

As a student Aquilina was President of the Maltese National Youth Council, KNŻ (2003), President of the Maltese Christian Democrat Students, SDM (2001-2002) and Student Representative on the Senate of the University of Malta (2002-2004).

== Political career ==
He has been an active member of the Nationalist Party for a considerable number of years. In 2002 he joined the Nationalist Party Youth Movement, MŻPN and was elected as its Vice President (2002-2009). He is a member of the Nationalist Party's executive committee having been elected first in 2008.He is the Opposition spokesman for good governance, strengthening of democracy, citizenship and reform of the Public Service. In 2020, Aquilina was elected Secretary of the Nationalist Party's parliamentary group after being nominated for the post by party leader Bernard Grech.

Aquilina is a member of the Standing Committee on Standards in Public Life established under the Standards in Public Life Act (Chapter 570 of the Laws of Malta), the Standing Committee on Public Appointments established under the Public Administration Act (Chapter 595 of the Laws of Malta) and of the Standing Committee on Privileges established by the Standing Orders of the House of Representatives.

He was Mayor of Siġġiewi (2012-2015) and President of the Administrative Council of the Nationalist Party (2011-2017).

== Personal life ==
He is the son of Carmelo (Nenu) Aquilina, the former Mayor of Siġġiewi. Aquilina is married with two children.
