= Robert Cutajar =

Maltese politician

Robert Cutajar is a Maltese Nationalist politician, elected in the Maltese Parliament for the first time in the 12th legislature, with the opposition party. Previous to being elected, he has served as vice mayor between 1999 and 2001, local councilor between 2002 and 2005 (resigning during this term) and mayor between 2008 and 2013.

He is now a member of parliament and a member of the Social Affairs Committee. He is the Nationalist Party's spokesperson for the Family and the rights of children, the elderly and persons with a disability.
