= 2013 Maltese general election =

2013 election in Malta

- 9 March 2013

All seats in the House of Representatives
- Turnout: 93.8% ▲0.5pp
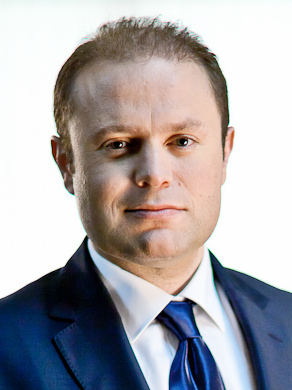

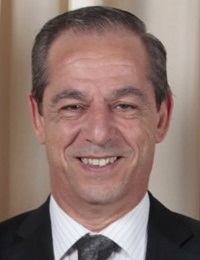
	First party	Second party
Leader	Joseph Muscat	Lawrence Gonzi
Party	Labour	Nationalist
Last election	34 seats, 48.79%	35 seats, 49.34%
Seats won	39	30
Seat change	▲5	▼5
Popular vote	167,533	132,426
Percentage	54.83%	43.34%
Swing	▲6.04pp	▼6.00pp
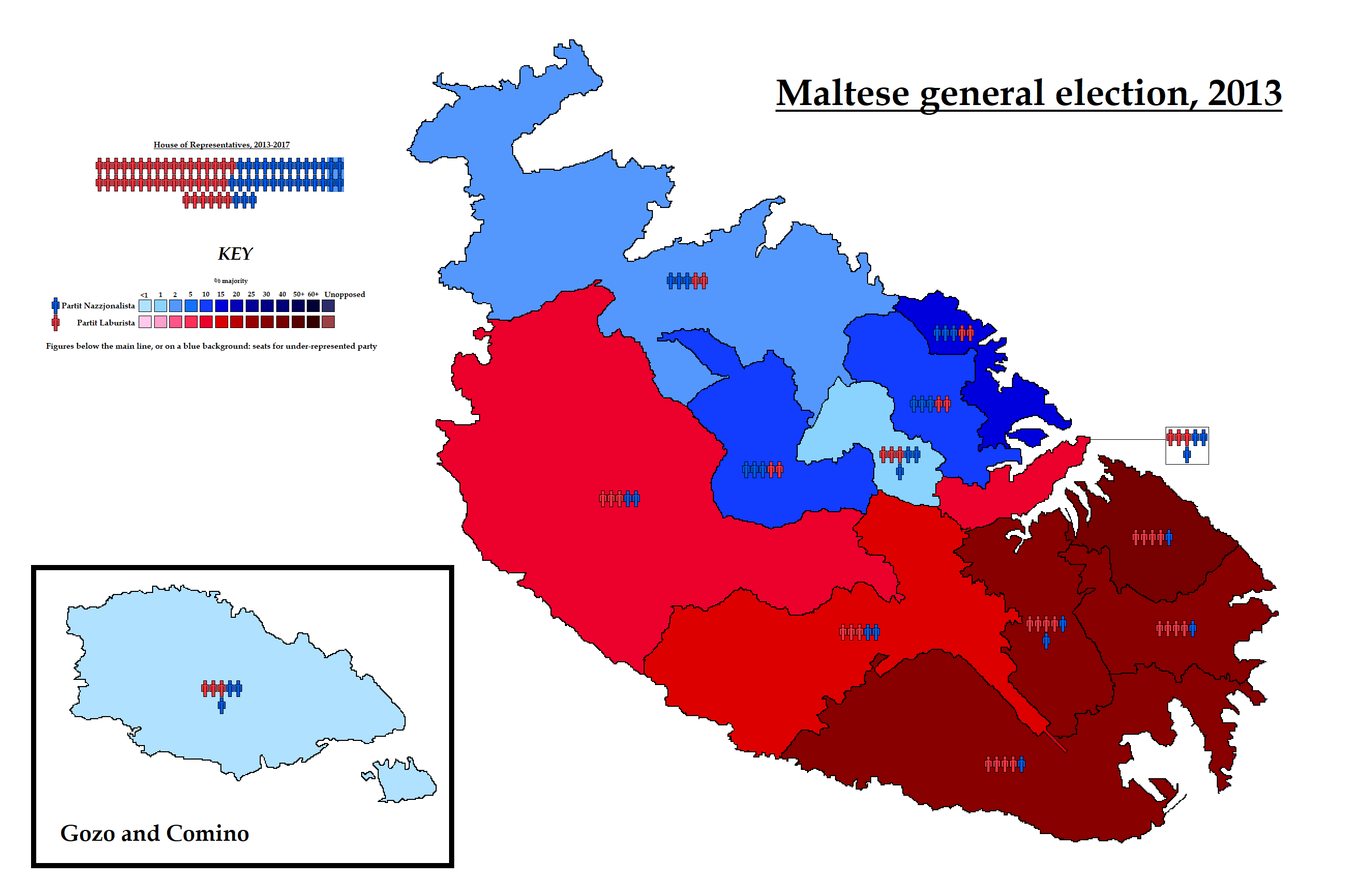
Prime Minister before election
Lawrence Gonzi
Nationalist
Elected Prime Minister
Joseph Muscat
Labour

General elections were held in Malta on 9 March 2013 to elect all members of the House of Representatives.

The Labour Party, led by Joseph Muscat, defeated the governing Nationalist Party, which had been in power since 1998, returning Labour to power after 15 years in opposition. The Nationalists suffered a 6% swing away from them in the popular vote, reaching a 51-year low of 43%. Labour achieved 55%, a 58-year high and a nine-seat majority in parliament, with Joseph Muscat becoming prime minister.

== Background ==
In the previous elections in 2008, Lawrence Gonzi's Nationalist Party was re-elected for a third term in government, this time with a narrow one-seat majority in parliament. On 10 December 2012 Lawrence Gonzi's government was defeated in a vote on the 2013 Financial Estimates when ruling party MP Franco Debono voted against the government's budget proposal in protest over transportation reform in giving a German operator the contract to manage the national bus service. Faced with loss of supply, Gonzi announced that the House of Representatives would be dissolved on 7 January and a general election called for 9 March.

== Electoral system ==
The system of voting used was, as in previous elections, proportional representation through modified single transferable vote with five MPs to be returned from each of thirteen districts, i.e. 65 constituency seats in total, with a variable number of at-large seats added to ensure that the overall first-preference votes are reflected in the composition of the House of Representatives. There were also some minor changes to the boundaries of electoral districts from the previous general election and improved voting arrangements for hospital patients.

== Parties ==
The two leading political parties contesting the election were the Nationalist Party of the incumbent prime minister, Lawrence Gonzi and the Labour Party, led by Joseph Muscat, for whom this was the first general election at the helm of the party. The Third party was Democratic Alternative, a Green Party, which was seeking to elect its first MP. A small number of independent candidates also ran for election.

National Action, which stood candidates in the 2008 general election and 2009 European Parliamentary election, ceased activities in 2010 and did not contest this election.

== Opinion polls ==
Date(s) Released	Polling institute	Nationalist	Labour	Democratic Alternative	Undecided/ No answer	Lead
7 January 2012	The Sunday Times	25.2% (46.9%)¤	29.5% (52.1%)¤	1.0% (1.0%)¤	44.3%	4%
8 July 2012	Misco International	22%	32%	1%	45%	10%
14 October 2012	Misco International	22%	34%	1%	43%	12%
13 January 2013	The Sunday Times	27% (44%)¤	33% (54%)¤	1% (1%)¤	38%	6%
3 March 2013	Malta Today	28.2%	40.2%	2.4%	29.2%	12%

¤ Opinion polls adjusted for the preference of undecided voters.

== Results ==
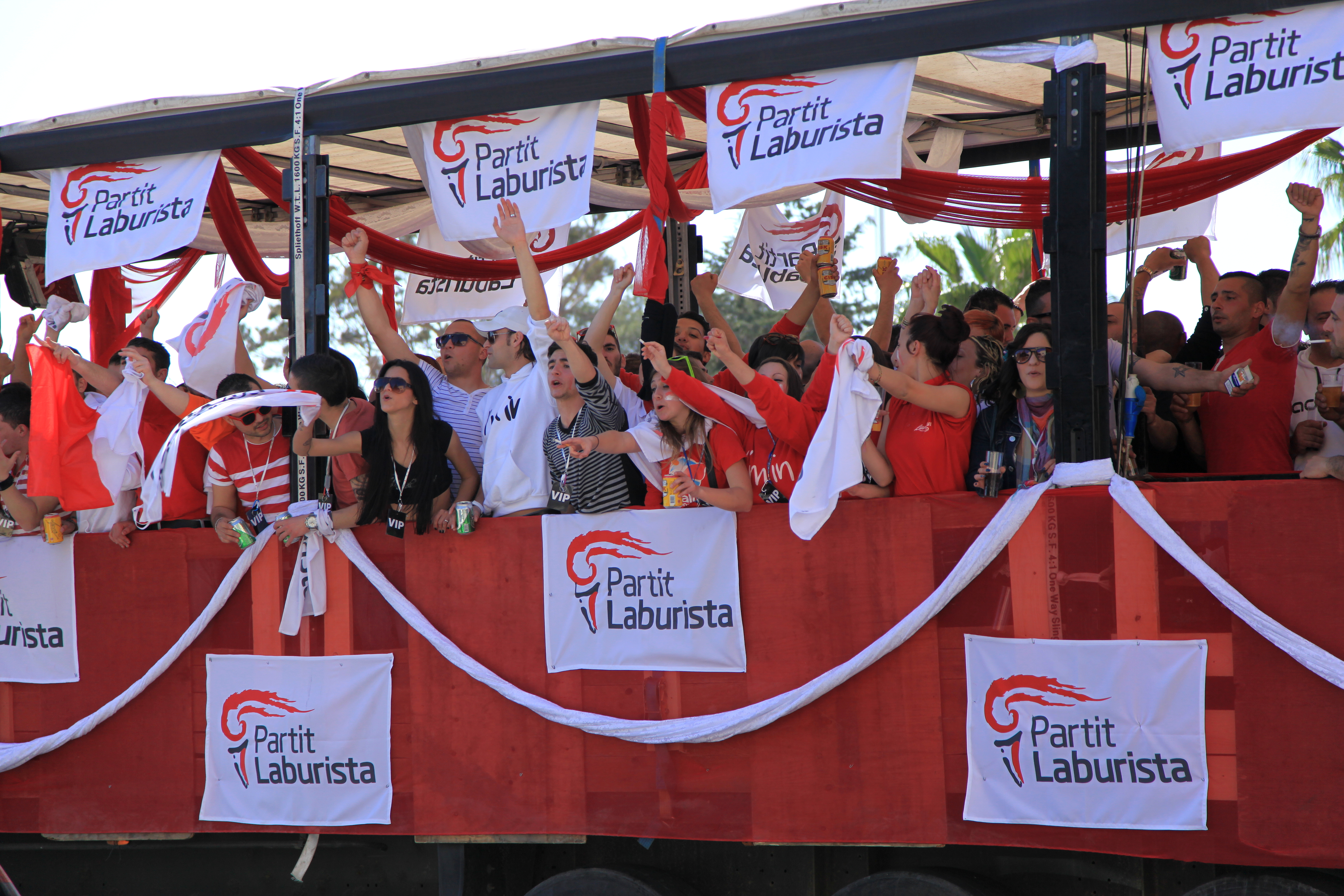
Labourites celebrate at Castille Square after the election.

Following the announcement of the preliminary result, in which Labour had 39 seats to 26 for the Nationalists, Labour party leader Joseph Muscat said from Naxxar: "I wasn't expecting such a landslide victory for Labour. We must all remain calm, tomorrow is another day." Nationalist party leader Lawrence Gonzi conceded the election in saying "The Nationalist Party needs to begin a reform process and at the same remain rooted in its values." This was the first time the Labour party won a majority in the government since Malta joined the European Union, as well as being the first Labour government since the new millennium (as the previous one should have ended in 2001, but ended prematurely in 1998). Furthermore, the Labour party won absolute majority of the votes in 23 of the 35 localities, increasing its overall share of the votes by 2.2% from the last elections. The Nationalist Party was subsequently awarded four at-large seats, bringing it to 30 in all, to adjust for its share of the first-preference vote.

Party	Votes	%	Seats	+/–
Labour Party	167,533	54.83	39	+5
Nationalist Party	132,426	43.34	30	–5
Democratic Alternative	5,506	1.80	0	0
Ajkla Party	47	0.02	0	New
Liberal Alliance	12	0.00	0	New
Independents	32	0.01	0	0
Total	305,556	100.00	69	0
Valid votes	305,556	98.69		
Invalid/blank votes	4,044	1.31		
Total votes	309,600	100.00		
Registered voters/turnout	330,072	93.80		
Source: Government of Malta, Parliament of Malta
