= List of ministers for foreign affairs of Malta =

Minister for Foreign Affairs of Malta
- Coat of arms of the Republic of Malta

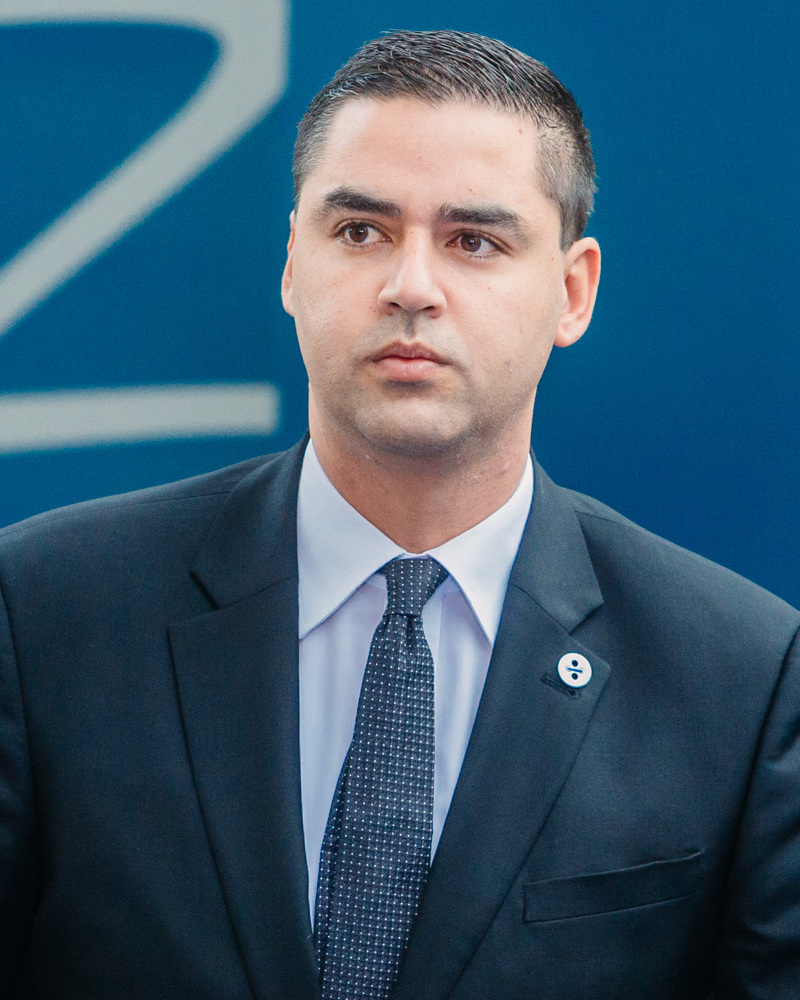
- Incumbent; Ian Borg since 30 March 2022
- Ministry for Foreign and European Affairs
- Member of: Cabinet
- Reports to: Prime Minister
- Seat: Palazzo Parisio
- Formation: 21 September 1964
- First holder: Giorgio Borġ Olivier

This is a list of ministers for foreign affairs of Malta. The ministry was established in 1964, and is now housed at Palazzo Parisio and other buildings in Valletta.

== List of officeholders ==
Political parties

Nationalist Party
Labour Party

Minister for Foreign Affairs			Term of office				Political party
No.	Portrait	Name (Birth–Death)	No.	Took office	Left office	Time in office	Political party
1		Giorgio Borġ Olivier (1911–1980)		21 September 1964	21 June 1971	6 years, 273 days	Nationalist Party
2		Dom Mintoff (1916–2012)		21 June 1971	20 December 1981	10 years, 182 days	Labour Party
3		Alex Sceberras Trigona (born 1950)		20 December 1981	12 May 1987	5 years, 143 days	Labour Party
4		Ċensu Tabone (1913–2012)		12 May 1987	16 March 1989	1 year, 308 days	Nationalist Party
5		Eddie Fenech Adami (born 1934)		16 March 1989	5 May 1990	1 year, 50 days	Nationalist Party
6		Guido de Marco (1931–2010)	1st	5 May 1990	28 October 1996	6 years, 176 days	Nationalist Party
7		George Vella (born 1942)	1st	29 October 1996	6 September 1998	1 year, 312 days	Labour Party
(6)		Guido de Marco (1931–2010)	2nd	8 September 1998	24 March 1999	197 days	Nationalist Party
8		Joe Borg (born 1952)		24 March 1999	23 March 2004	4 years, 365 days	Nationalist Party
9		John Dalli (born 1948)		23 March 2004	3 July 2004	102 days	Nationalist Party
10		Michael Frendo (born 1955)		3 July 2004	12 March 2008	3 years, 253 days	Nationalist Party
11		Tonio Borg (born 1957)		12 March 2008	28 November 2012	4 years, 261 days	Nationalist Party
12		Francis Zammit Dimech (1954–2025)		28 November 2012	13 March 2013	105 days	Nationalist Party
(7)		George Vella (born 1942)	2nd	13 March 2013	7 June 2017	4 years, 86 days	Labour Party
13		Carmelo Abela (born 1972)		7 June 2017	15 January 2020	2 years, 222 days	Labour Party
14		Evarist Bartolo (born 1952)		15 January 2020	30 March 2022	2 years, 74 days	Labour Party
15		Ian Borg (born 1986)		30 March 2022	4 June 2026	4 years, 66 days	Labour Party
16		Chris Fearne (born 1963)		4 June 2026	Incumbent	95 days	Labour Party

== Gallery ==
List of the ministers at Palazzo Parisio
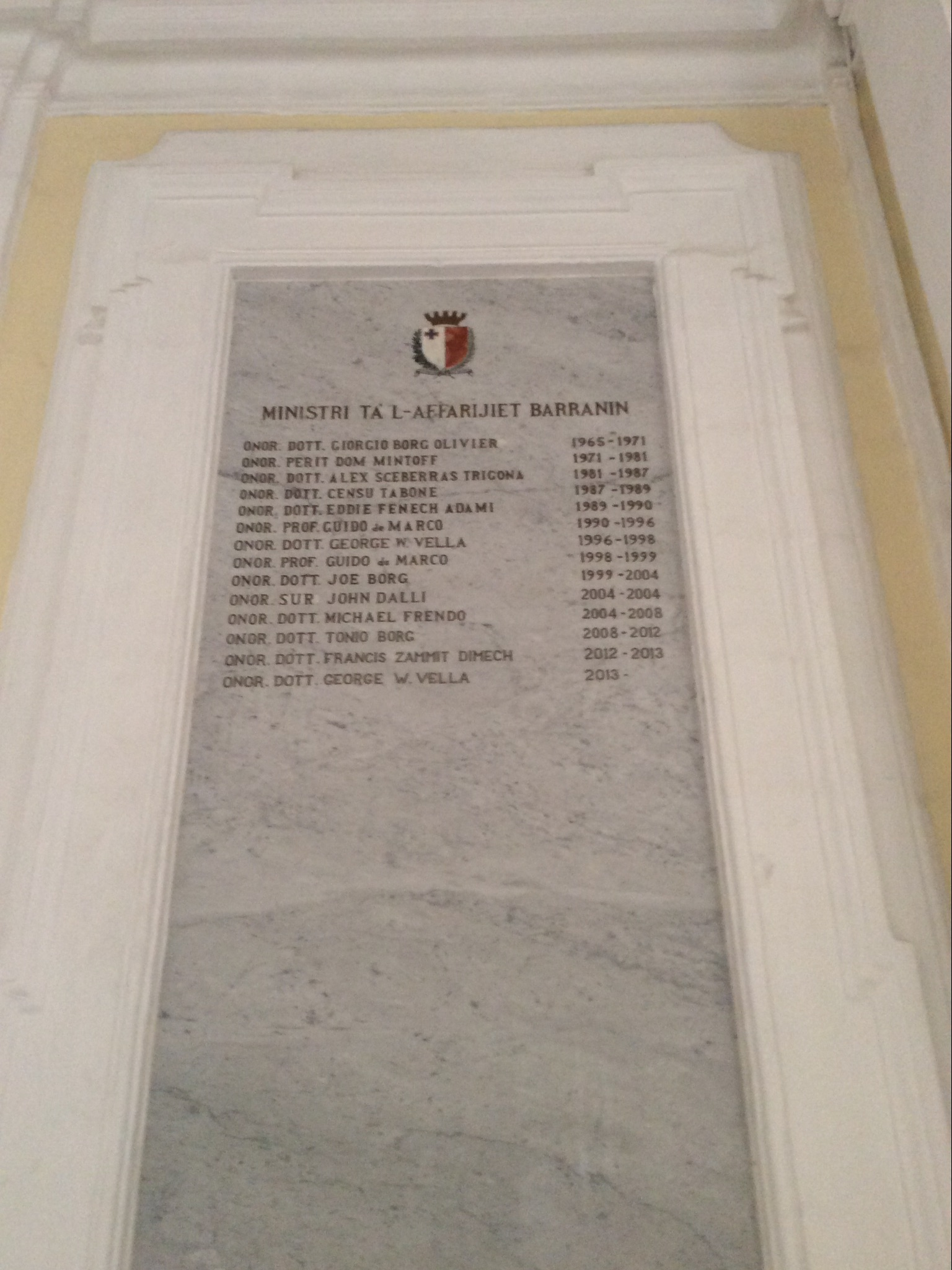
Paintings of the ministers at Palazzo Parisio
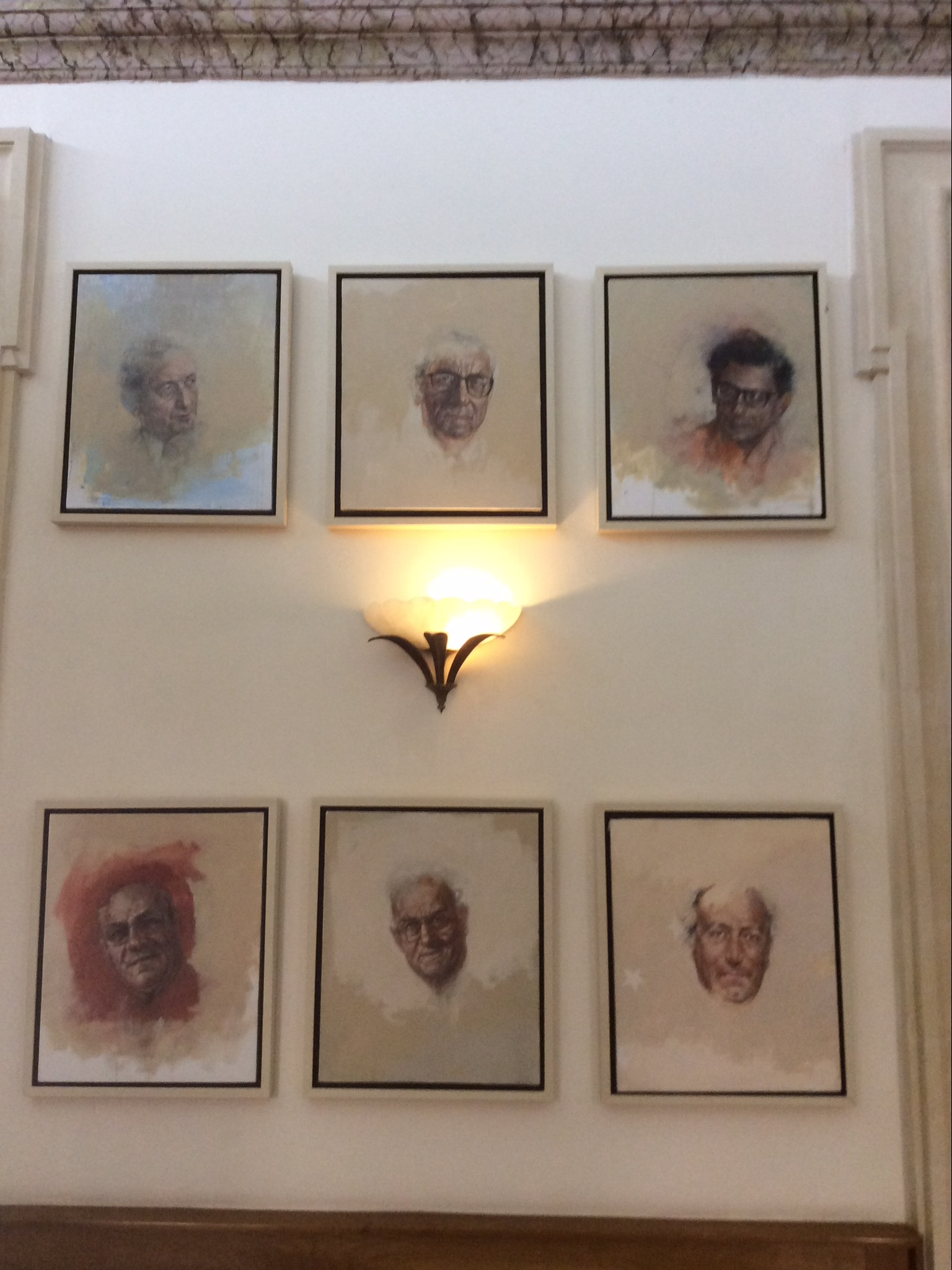

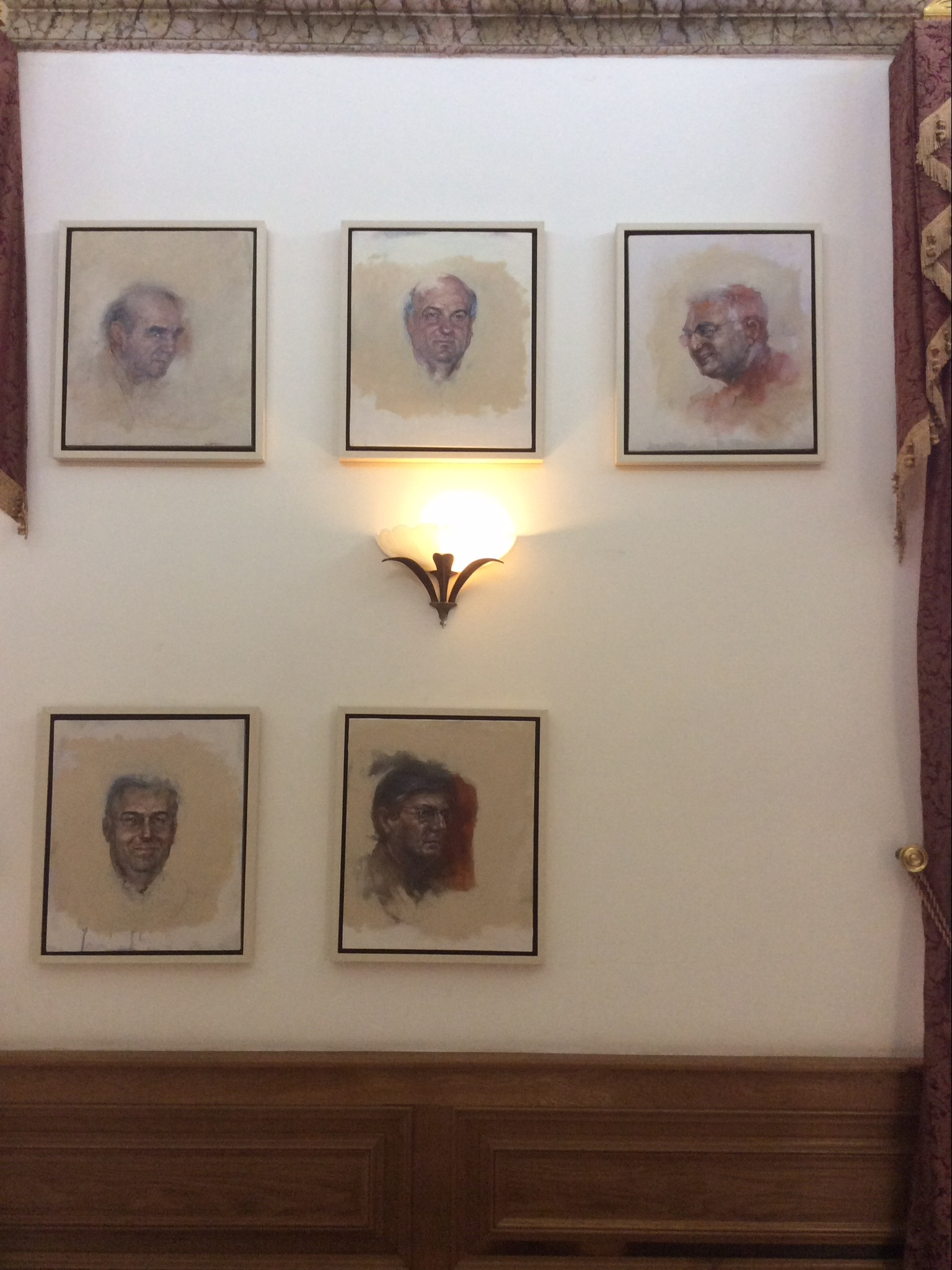

== See also ==
- Ministry for Foreign and European Affairs (Malta)
- Government of Malta

== Sources ==
- Maltese ministries, etc – Rulers.org
