= Chris Fearne =

Maltese physician and politician (born 1963)

The Honourable Christopher Fearne MP
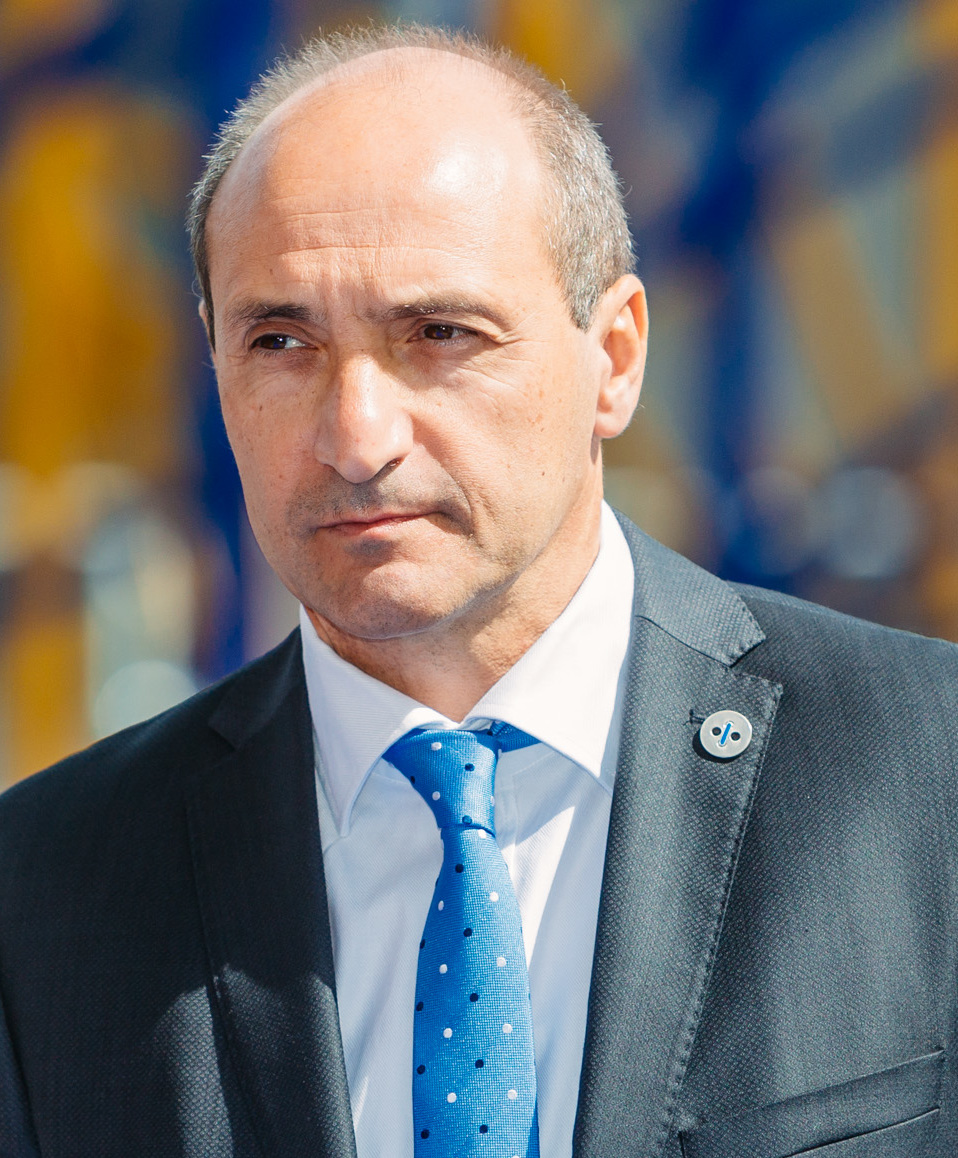
- Fearne in 2017

Minister for Foreign and European Affairs
- Incumbent
- Assumed office 4 June 2026
- Prime Minister: Robert Abela
- Preceded by: Ian Borg

Deputy Prime Minister of Malta
- In office 17 July 2017 – 10 May 2024
- President: Marie Louise Coleiro Preca; George Vella; Myriam Spiteri Debono
- Prime Minister: Joseph Muscat; Robert Abela
- Preceded by: Louis Grech
- Succeeded by: Ian Borg
Ministerial offices 2014‍–‍present
Minister for European Funds, Social Dialogue and Consumer Protection
In office 6 January 2024 – 10 May 2024
Prime Minister	Robert Abela
Preceded by	Silvio Schembri as Minister for European Funds; Julia Farrugia Portelli as Minister for Consumer Rights
Minister for Health
In office 28 April 2016 – 6 January 2024
Prime Minister	Joseph Muscat; Robert Abela
Preceded by	Konrad Mizzi
Succeeded by	Jo Etienne Abela
Parliamentary Secretary for Health
In office 1 April 2014 – 28 April 2016
Prime Minister	Joseph Muscat
Preceded by	Position established
Succeeded by	Position abolished

Deputy Leader of the Labour Party Parliamentary Affairs
- In office 15 July 2017 – 10 May 2024
- Preceded by: Louis Grech
- Succeeded by: Ian Borg

Member of Parliament
- Incumbent
- Assumed office 13 March 2013

Personal details
- Born: 12 March 1963 (age 63) Attard, Crown Colony of Malta
- Party: Labour Party
- Spouse: Astrid
- Children: 3
- Education: University of Malta; St Aloysius’ College

Christopher Fearne MP (born 12 March 1963) is a Maltese physician and politician who has served as Minister for Foreign and European Affairs since June 2026. He previously served as Deputy Prime Minister of Malta from 2017 to 2024, Minister for Health from 2016 to 2024, and Minister for European Funds, Social Dialogue and Consumer Protection from January to May 2024.

Fearne was first appointed to government as Parliamentary Secretary for Health in April 2014. In July 2017, the Labour Party elected him as Deputy Leader for Parliamentary Affairs, thus assuming the role of Deputy Prime Minister of Malta and Leader of the House.

== Education ==
Fearne received his formal education at St. Aloysius College and at the University of Malta. As a student, Fearne was involved in a number of youth organizations. He served as secretary general of the Maltese Federation of Youth Organisations, officer within the University Students’ Council, KSU, the Malta Medical Students' Association, and as international secretary of the Young Socialist League.

He qualified in Medicine and Surgery in 1987, becoming a Fellow of The Royal College of Surgeons of Edinburgh. He worked and studied in a number of children's hospitals in England, including Alder Hey Children's Hospital in Liverpool, and Great Ormond Street Hospital in London.

== Medical career ==
Prior to his appointment as Parliamentary Secretary for Health in April 2014, he worked as a Consultant Paediatric Surgeon and Clinical Chairman at Mater Dei Hospital. He is a Member of Parliament for the Labour Party and was the chairman of the Foreign and European Affairs Committee at the Maltese House of Representatives.

Fearne has worked as a doctor and surgeon since 1987. He was also a lecturer in paediatric surgery at the University of Malta and an examiner at its medical school. Fearne is a founding director of the Malta Institute for Medical Education and the chairperson of Celebrities for Kids, a voluntary NGO promoting children's rights.

== Political career ==
Fearne was elected to the House of Representatives in March 2013 following the electoral victory of the Labour Party in that general election. Following a reshuffle in the cabinet in April 2014 by Prime Minister Joseph Muscat, Fearne was appointed Parliamentary Secretary for Health under the office of the Minister for Energy and Health Konrad Mizzi. This was the first position he held as part of the Government of Malta. Fearne was appointed Minister of Health in April 2016.

On 15 July 2017, Fearne was elected as the Deputy Leader for Parliamentary Affairs of the Labour Party, succeeding Louis Grech, and following his election as Deputy Leader for Parliamentary Affairs, Chris Fearne was sworn in as the Deputy Prime Minister of Malta.

Fearne said that the damage done to Malta from the resignations following the case of Daphne Caruana Galizia was almost irreparable.

Following the announcement of the resignation of Joseph Muscat from Prime Minister of Malta and Leader of the Labour party, Fearne was the first Member of Parliament to officially express his intention of contesting for the vacated role. Fearne was endorsed by many fellow MPs. Fearne would run for Leader of the Partit Laburista, a position which would effectively see him sworn as prime minister of Malta.

=== Minister of Health ===
On 27 February 2019, Fearne said that abortion was the reason why Malta dropped 10 places in the Public Service Ranking of the Euro health consumer index, although the official report did not match up with this claim.

On 22 April, as Health Minister, Fearne announced the start of a project of €40 million for a new "health hub" in Raħal Ġdid, which would act as a regional medical centre. Fearne explained that the total cost includes €25 million for the infrastructure, and that €33 million are funded by the European Union.

On 14 May 2019 Fearne announced that the Government of Malta would be investing €3 million in cancer treatment. He announced that there would be the introduction of PD-1 inhibitors in the government's formulary at the Oncology Centre at Mater Dei Hospital.

On 12 September 2019 Fearne launched a three-year plan to reinstate health centres in every locality where primary health care would be prioritised. Reportedly, Fearne's Ministry was looking to open a new health centre in Żabbar and refurbish the one in Żejtun by mid-October 2019, and in 2020 the Ministry would open new ones in Valletta, Marsaxlokk and Vittoriosa, refurbish Għaxaq, Santa Luċija and Tarxien and seek for new premises in Kalkara and Ħamrun.

Since 2020, Fearne has also been a member of the Global Leaders Group on Antimicrobial Resistance, co-chaired by prime ministers Sheikh Hasina and Mia Mottley.

On April 3, 2023, Fearne was nominated for president of World Health Assembly In May 2023, Fearne was appointed President of the World Health Assembly during its seventy-sixth session, following a unanimous vote by representatives of the 194 member states of the World Health Organization. He was the first Maltese person to hold the position.

==== Medicine pricing transparency ====
Fearne spearheaded the Valletta Declaration initiative. Agreed upon in 2017, during the Maltese Presidency of the Council of the EU, the Valletta Declaration consisted of ten EU Member States: Malta, Italy, Greece, Cyprus, Romania, Spain, Portugal, Croatia, Ireland and Slovenia, and aimed at establishing a technical and political cooperation on cross-border health matters such as anti-microbial resistance and price transparency of innovative medicines.

Speaking to Politico, Fearne said that if "we can go to the industry as a group and say that it’s no longer acceptable to have this secrecy on any negotiating procedure, then the industry will have to take note."

Pharmaceutical companies objected to the Malta-led proposal. At that stage, pharmaceutical companies individually negotiated the supplies of medicines including those medicines deemed to be innovative and which could cure rare diseases. According to Fearne pharma companies are at an advantage position as countries are not in a position to divulge the prices they are paying for the medicines procured. The medicines in question were prohibitively expensive for most national health services and their procurement threatens the sustainability of systems.

According to Fearne, “the model that we will be proposing (...) is that member states which are [providing] funds should aim to go into agreement with the industry to share the benefits when there are new drugs on the market. The industry wants and needs support from member states because it’s evident that industry on its own is not going in for the risk of developing new antibiotics.

While speaking at a Politico Healthcare summit in July 2019, in Amsterdam, Fearne called on his counterparts to push for new rule at European level to share drug prices among Member States. Fearne and the Valletta Declaration group countered the pharmaceutical industry arguments that price transparency leads to higher prices. He was quote saying that “the industry tells us that price transparency would push prices up. Let’s be frank, it’s not true”.

== Controversies ==
Fearne was criticised by the local media regarding appointments to the Foundation for Medical Services. A party activist, Carmen Ciantar, was given a financial package of €104,000 on her appointment as FMS CEO. Ciantar had close ties to Fearne, being one of his personal electoral campaign managers. Fearne was alleged to be in a relationship with Ciantar, though these allegations were later withdrawn.

On 10 May 2024, Fearne resigned as deputy prime minister and withdrew his candidacy for the European Commission after charges were filed against him over fraud and misappropriation of funds related to an investigation into a 2015 agreement to privatize three hospitals which was subsequently annulled in 2023 by the courts. Fearne, who was a junior health minister at the time of the agreement, denied wrongdoing, but said that his resignation was the "right thing to do".

== Family ==
Fearne and his wife Astrid have three children.

Political offices
Preceded by Louis Grech	Deputy Prime Minister of Malta; 2017–	Succeeded by Incumbent
Preceded by Konrad Mizzi	Minister of Health; 2016–	Succeeded by Incumbent
Party political offices
Preceded by Louis Grech	Deputy Leader of the Malta Labour Party; Parliamentary Affairs; 2017–	Succeeded by Incumbent
