= List of ministers for home affairs of Malta =

Fifteen people have served as Minister for Home Affairs of Malta since the office was established in 1976.

Political parties

Labour Party Nationalist Party

Minister for Home Affairs			Term of office				Political party
No.	Portrait	Name (Birth–Death)	No.	Took office	Left office	Time in office	Political party
1		Dom Mintoff (1916–2012)	1st	25 September 1976	20 December 1981	5 years, 86 days	Labour Party
2		Lorry Sant (1937–1995)		20 December 1981	3 September 1983	1 year, 257 days	Labour Party
(1)		Dom Mintoff (1916–2012)	2nd	3 September 1983	22 December 1984	1 year, 110 days	Labour Party
3		Karmenu Mifsud Bonnici (1933–)		22 December 1984	12 May 1987	2 years, 141 days	Labour Party
4		Guido de Marco (1931–2010)		12 May 1987	5 May 1990	2 years, 358 days	Nationalist Party
5		Ugo Mifsud Bonnici (1932–)		5 May 1990	27 February 1992	1 year, 298 days	Nationalist Party
6		Louis Galea (1948–)		27 February 1992	1 April 1995	3 years, 33 days	Nationalist Party
7		Tonio Borg (1957–)	1st	1 April 1995	28 October 1996	1 year, 210 days	Nationalist Party
8		Alfred Sant (1948–)		29 October 1996	6 September 1998	1 year, 312 days	Labour Party
(7)		Tonio Borg (1957–)	2nd	8 September 1998	12 March 2008	9 years, 186 days	Nationalist Party
9		Carmelo Mifsud Bonnici (1960–)		12 March 2008	30 May 2012	4 years, 79 days	Nationalist Party
10		Lawrence Gonzi (1953–)		30 May 2012	13 March 2013	287 days	Nationalist Party
11		Emmanuel Mallia (–)		13 March 2013	9 December 2014	1 year, 271 days	Labour Party
12		Carmelo Abela (1972–)		9 December 2014	9 June 2017	2 years, 182 days	Labour Party
13		Michael Farrugia		9 June 2017	13 January 2020	2 years, 218 days	Labour Party
14		Byron Camilleri (1988–)		15 January 2020	4 June 2026	6 years, 140 days	Labour Party
15		Glenn Bedingfield (1974–)		4 June 2026	Incumbent	148 days	Labour Party

== See also ==
- Government of Malta

== Sources ==
- Maltese ministries, etc – Rulers.org
