= Randolph De Battista =

Maltese Ambassador

Ambassador Randolph De Battista
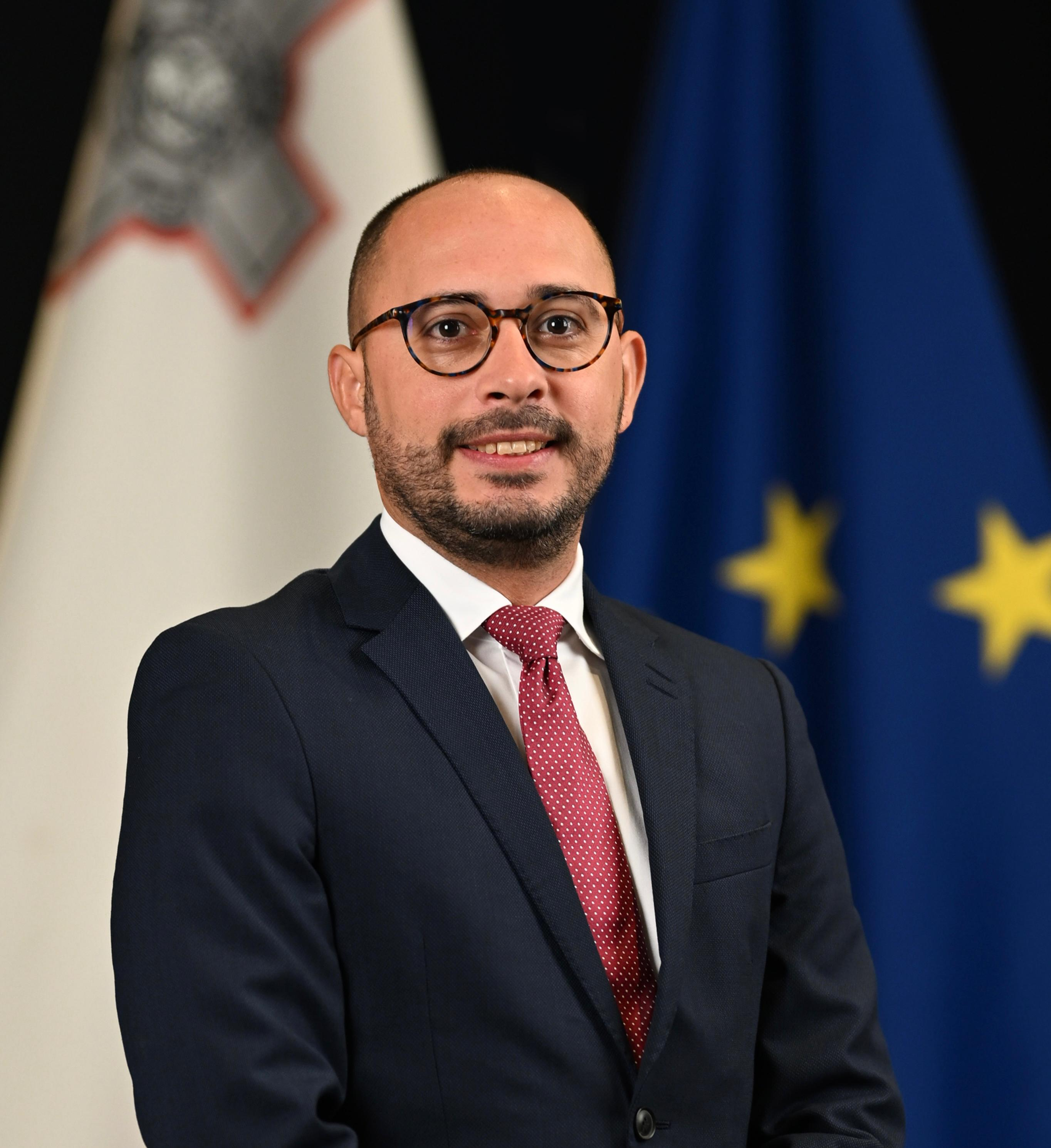

Permanent Representative of Malta to the United Nations office & other International Organizations in Geneva
- Incumbent
- Assumed office 27 January 2025

Personal details
- Born: 1 May 1987 (age 39) Malta
- Education: University of Malta

Randolph De Battista (born 1 May 1987) is Malta's Permanent Representative to the United Nations Office and other International Organizations in Geneva. He is a former Maltese politician and was a member of the Parliament of Malta between 2022 and 2024. He previously was Chief Executive Officer of the Labour Party. He joined the Parliamentary Group following the 2022 General Elections in Malta and represented the 9th Electoral District, having been chosen by Prime Minister Robert Abela to form part of his team. In August 2024, he was nominated as Ambassador and Permanent Representative to the United Nations Office in Geneva, and presented his credentials to Tatiana Valovaya, the Director-General of the United Nations Office in Geneva in January 2025. He is the partner of former Member of the European Parliament Cyrus Engerer.

Throughout his career, De Battista worked in the structures of Partit Laburista as the party's Communications Coordinator, as a diplomat at the Maltese Permanent Representation to the European Union in the position of Chef de Cabinet, as well as formed part of Michel Barnier's team in the European Commission's TF50 which led the Brexit negotiations on behalf of the European Union. De Battista was also the founder and editor of TheJournal.Mt

== Early life ==
De Battista obtained a Bachelor of Laws at the University of Malta in 2009, followed by a Diploma of notary Public in 2010 and went on to read for a Doctorate of Laws degree and graduated in 2012 with a doctoral thesis entitled "The Introduction of Sperm Donation in Malta: In the light of a Parent's Right to Family Life and the Best Interest of the Child".

During his student days De Battista was a member of social-democrat student organisation Pulse, where he also was President between 2006 and 2008. During his tenure, Pulse managed to win the elections for the Junior College Council in 2007.

== Career ==
In 2011 he was appointed as Partit Laburista's Communications Coordinator, where he formed part of the communications team of the 2013 General Elections. He then was Deputy Chief of Staff to the Deputy Prime Minister and Minister for European Affairs Louis Grech, before being nominated as Chef de Cabinet at the Maltese Permanent Representation to the European Union, during the preparations for Malta's first Presidency of the Council of the European Union.

In 2017, De Battista was appointed to work in Michel Barnier's European Commission Task Force 50, in charge of negotiating the departure of the United Kingdom from the European Union.

From September 2017 to 2020, De Battista was appointed Chief Executive Officer of Partit Laburista. He was reappointed in the role in April 2022 and remained until August 2024. De Battista was also the founder and editor of TheJournal.Mt. He replaced Rosianne Cutajar on the Social Affairs Committee of the Parliament of Malta.

De Battista was the Head of the Maltese Delegation at the Inter-Parliamentary Union

In January 2024, De Battista was appointed as a member of the Parliamentary Assembly of the Council of Europe.

In May 2024, De Battista was appointed as a member of Malta's delegation to the NATO Parliamentary Assembly. During the Spring 2024 Session, Malta was unanimously approved as Associate Member of the Parliamentary Assembly.

== Political activism ==
Randolph De Battista is a former progressive politician who has campaigned for the introduction of a number of civil liberties in Malta. He has frequently advocated for Comprehensive Sexuality Education as well as Sexual and Reproductive Health and Rights.

He was part of the youth Stand Up! campaign for the introduction of divorce legislation in Malta in 2011 and has campaigned for equality for the LGBTIQ+ community, including the removal of restrictions for homosexual men from donating blood.

In December 2022, during the landmark Parliamentary debate on the amendments to the Maltese Criminal Code to allow the termination of pregnancy in cases where the woman’s life is in danger or her health in grave jeopardy, De Battista and Rebecca Buttigieg received threats through an anonymous letter addressed to their offices in Parliament

== See also ==
- List of members of the parliament of Malta, 2022–2027
