= Louis Grech =

Maltese politician

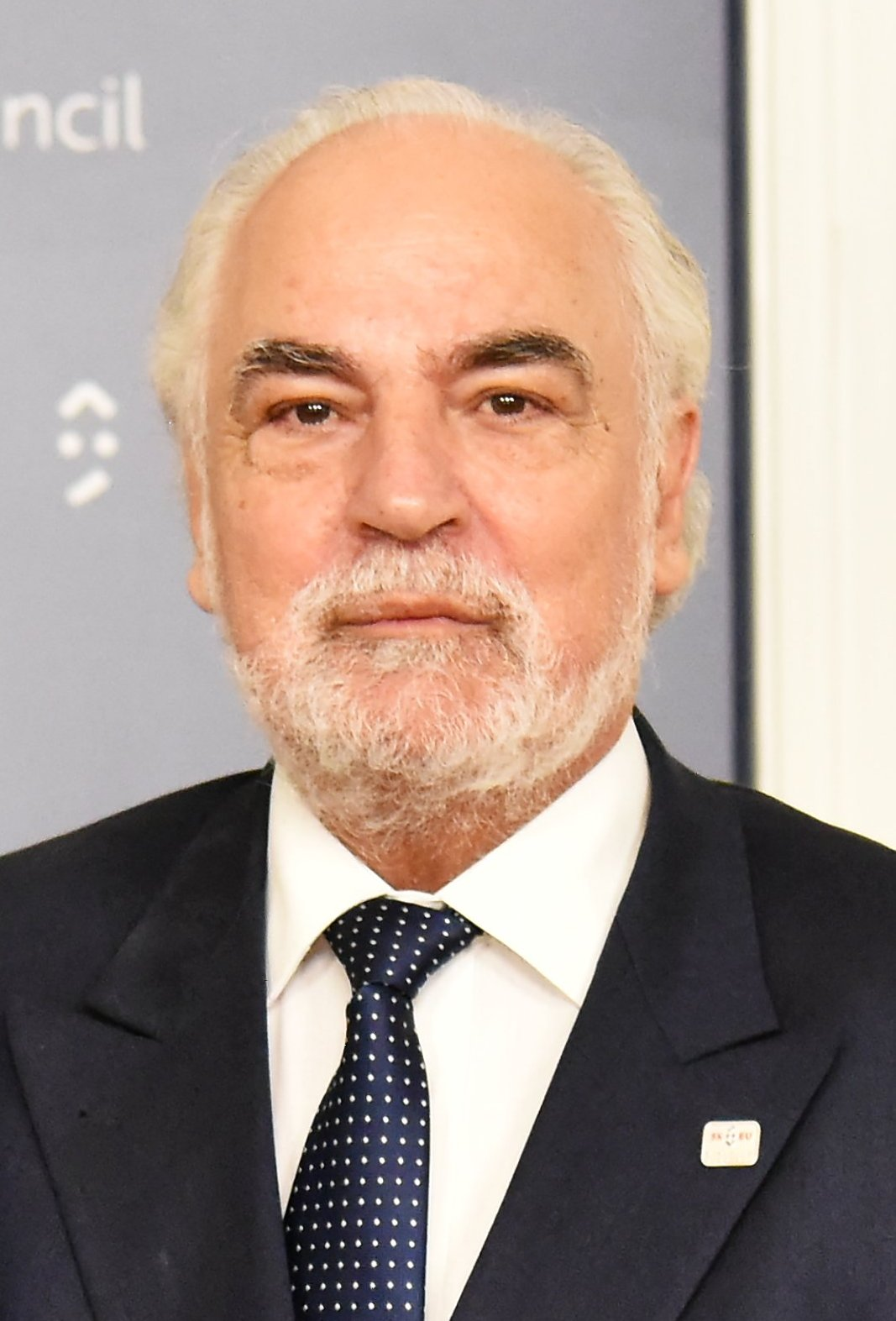
- Louis Grech in 2016

Deputy Prime Minister of Malta
- In office 13 March 2013 – 5 June 2017
- President: George Abela; Marie Louise Coleiro Preca
- Prime Minister: Joseph Muscat
- Preceded by: Tonio Borg
- Succeeded by: Chris Fearne

Minister of European Affairs
- In office 13 March 2013 – 5 June 2017
- Prime Minister: Joseph Muscat
- Preceded by: None (office created)
- Succeeded by: Helena Dalli

Deputy Leader of the Labour Party Parliamentary Affairs
- In office 27 December 2012 – 5 June 2017
- Preceded by: Dr Anglu Farrugia
- Succeeded by: Chris Fearne

Member of Parliament
- In office 2013 – 5 June 2017
- Majority: 2013: 5626 (1st District), 3178 (11th District)

Member of the European Parliament
- In office 12 June 2004 – 27 December 2012
- Majority: 2004: 15,371; 2009: 27,753

Personal details
- Born: 22 March 1947 (age 79) Ħamrun, Crown Colony of Malta
- Party: Labour (PL)
- Children: Xandru; Francesca; Louisa
- Website: www.louisgrech.eu

Louis Grech (born 22 March 1947) is a Maltese politician who served as Deputy Prime Minister of Malta, as well as Minister of European Affairs. He also served as Deputy Leader for Parliamentary Affairs of the Labour Party. He currently serves as consultant to the Prime Minister Robert Abela and attends Cabinet.

== Career ==
=== Air Malta ===
Louis Grech was one of the first pioneers in the setting up and formation of the national flag carrier Air Malta under a Labour Government in 1973. Initially, he was responsible for Administration, organisational strategy, Personnel and industrial relations, as well as being Corporate Secretary of the company.

In 1979 Grech was appointed General Manager, and in 1985 he was appointed managing director and CEO of the national airline. He was re-appointed CEO in 1997, where he oversaw an increase in traffic to 1.8m passengers, and Chairman of the Air Malta Group, which was one of the biggest companies in Malta with an international dimension. The Group had interests in Aviation and Tourism, employed around 2,500 workers, generated a turnover of approximately €293.5m, and was responsible for around 5.3% of Government revenue and 5.5% equivalent jobs in the country.

During his tenure as CEO, Louis Grech extended the activities of the Group and created other ancillary sectors in various sectors such as hotels, tour operations, tourist handling, air service to Gozo, insurance, Duty Free services and hotel management.

=== Lufthansa Technik ===
One of Louis Grech's major achievements was to attract Lufthansa Technik to Malta and convince the German enterprise to enter into a joint venture with Air Malta, which led to a foreign investment which is still growing. He was appointed by the Shareholders of Lufthansa Technik as well as those of Air Malta as the first Chairman of Lufthansa Technik (Malta).

=== Other activities ===
During his long career, Louis Grech has held a number of managerial posts. These include Director of Bank of Valletta, Central Bank of Malta, Middle Sea, Medavia, Malta International Airport, Dragonara Casino, and various private companies. Other appointments include member of the Malta Institute of Management, member of the Industrial Tribunal, founder trustee of the Foundation for International Studies, and guest lecturer at the University of Malta. Between 1992 and 1996, Grech also provided consultancy in various sectors ranging from industrial relations, through tourism, manufacturing, and financing to marketing.

== Political life ==
=== Member of the European Parliament (2004-2013) ===
Grech was first elected as an MEP in 2004. As part of Malta's first group of MEPs, he was a member of the Party of European Socialists. In the subsequent MEP elections of 2009, Grech was re-elected with a larger tally of first-preference votes. His positive showing led to his nomination as the Head of Delegation of the Labour Party to the European Parliament. Grech held this seat until his election to the House of Representatives of Malta in 2013.

His work during his tenure as an MEP includes sitting on the Committee on Budgets, vice-chair of the delegation for relations with the Korean Peninsula, member of the delegation to the Euro-Mediterranean Parliamentary Assembly, substitute for the Committee on Regional Development, and substitute for the delegation to the EU–Croatia Joint Parliamentary Committee.

=== Deputy Leader of the Malta Labour Party (2012-2017) ===
On 27 December 2012 he was elected as the Deputy Leader for Parliamentary Affairs of the Labour Party, replacing Angelo Farrugia.

=== Deputy Prime Minister of Malta (2013-2017) ===
Following the Labour Party's landslide win in the 2013 elections, Louis Grech was sworn in as the Deputy Prime Minister of Malta. As a member of Joseph Muscat's first cabinet, he was given the post of Minister of European Affairs and Implementation of the Electoral Manifesto. He was responsible for Relations with the European Union EU Internal Coordination, EU Presidency 2017, and EU Funds and Programmes. Ian Borg assisted him as Parliamentary Secretary for EU funds and 2017 Presidency during this period.

== Personal life ==
Grech married Maria in 1972. They have 3 children; Xandru Grech, Francesca and Louisa.

Political offices
Preceded by Tonio Borg	Deputy Prime Minister of Malta; 2013–2017	Succeeded by Chris Fearne
Preceded by Office created	Minister of European Affairs; 2013–2017	Succeeded by Helena Dalli
Party political offices
Preceded by Angelo Farrugia	Deputy Leader of the Malta Labour Party; Parliamentary Affairs; 2012–2017	Succeeded by Chris Fearne
