= List of deputy prime ministers of Malta =

Deputy Prime Minister of Malta Deputat Prim Ministru ta' Malta (Maltese)
- Coat of Arms of the Republic of Malta

- Incumbent; Ian Borg
- Style: The Honourable
- Member of: Cabinet of Malta
- Appointer: President of Malta
- Term length: General Elections are held every five years at a maximum, but may be held sooner. The Deputy Prime Minister is by convention the deputy leader of the victorious party. No term limits are imposed on the office.
- Formation: 1947

The deputy prime minister of Malta (Maltese: Viċi Prim Ministru) is the deputy head of government and second most senior officer in the Government of Malta after the prime minister of Malta, being a minister in his own right.

== Constitutional functions ==
Being the deputy to the prime minister, the deputy prime minister can take the position of acting prime minister when the prime minister is temporarily absent. Eleven people have served as deputy prime minister of Malta since the office was established in 1947. The post did not exist in the period between 1949 and 1971 and was vacant in the period between 2012 and 2013.

== List of officeholders ==
Political parties

Labour Party
Nationalist Party

| Deputy Prime Minister | | | Term of office | | | Political party |
| No. | Portrait | Name (Birth–Death) | No. | Took office | Left office | Political party |
|---|---|---|---|---|---|---|
| 1 | | Dom Mintoff (1916–2012) | | 1947 | 1949 | Labour Party |
Office abolished (1949 – 1971)
| 2 | | Anton Buttigieg (1912–1983) | | 1971 | 1976 | Labour Party |
| 3 | | Agatha Barbara (1923–2002) | | 1976 | 1981 | Labour Party |
| 4 | | Wistin Abela (1933–2014) | | 1981 | 1983 | Labour Party |
| 5 | | Karmenu Mifsud Bonnici (1933–2022) | | 1983 | 1984 | Labour Party |
| 6 | | Guze Cassar (1918–2001) | | 1984 | 1987 | Labour Party |
| 7 | | Guido de Marco (1931–2010) | 1st | 1987 | 28 October 1996 | Nationalist Party |
| 8 | | George Vella (born 1942) | | 28 October 1996 | 6 September 1998 | Labour Party |
| (7) | | Guido de Marco (1931–2010) | 2nd | 6 September 1998 | 29 March 1999 | Nationalist Party |
| 9 | | Lawrence Gonzi (born 1953) | | 29 March 1999 | 23 March 2004 | Nationalist Party |
| 10 | | Tonio Borg (born 1957) | | 23 March 2004 | 28 November 2012 | Nationalist Party |
Office vacant (28 November 2012 – 13 March 2013)
| 11 | | Louis Grech (born 1947) | | 13 March 2013 | 5 June 2017 | Labour Party |
| 12 | | Chris Fearne (born 1963) | | 17 July 2017 | 10 May 2024 | Labour Party |
| 13 | | Ian Borg (born 1986) | | 17 September 2024 | incumbent | Labour Party |

== See also ==
- Deputy Prime Minister of Malta
- Prime Minister of Malta
- President of Malta
- Government of Malta
- House of Representatives of Malta
