= Engerer =

Engerer is a surname. Notable people with the surname include:

- Brigitte Engerer (1952–2012), French pianist
- Cyrus Engerer (born 1981), Maltese politician
