= Glenn Bedingfield =

Maltese politician

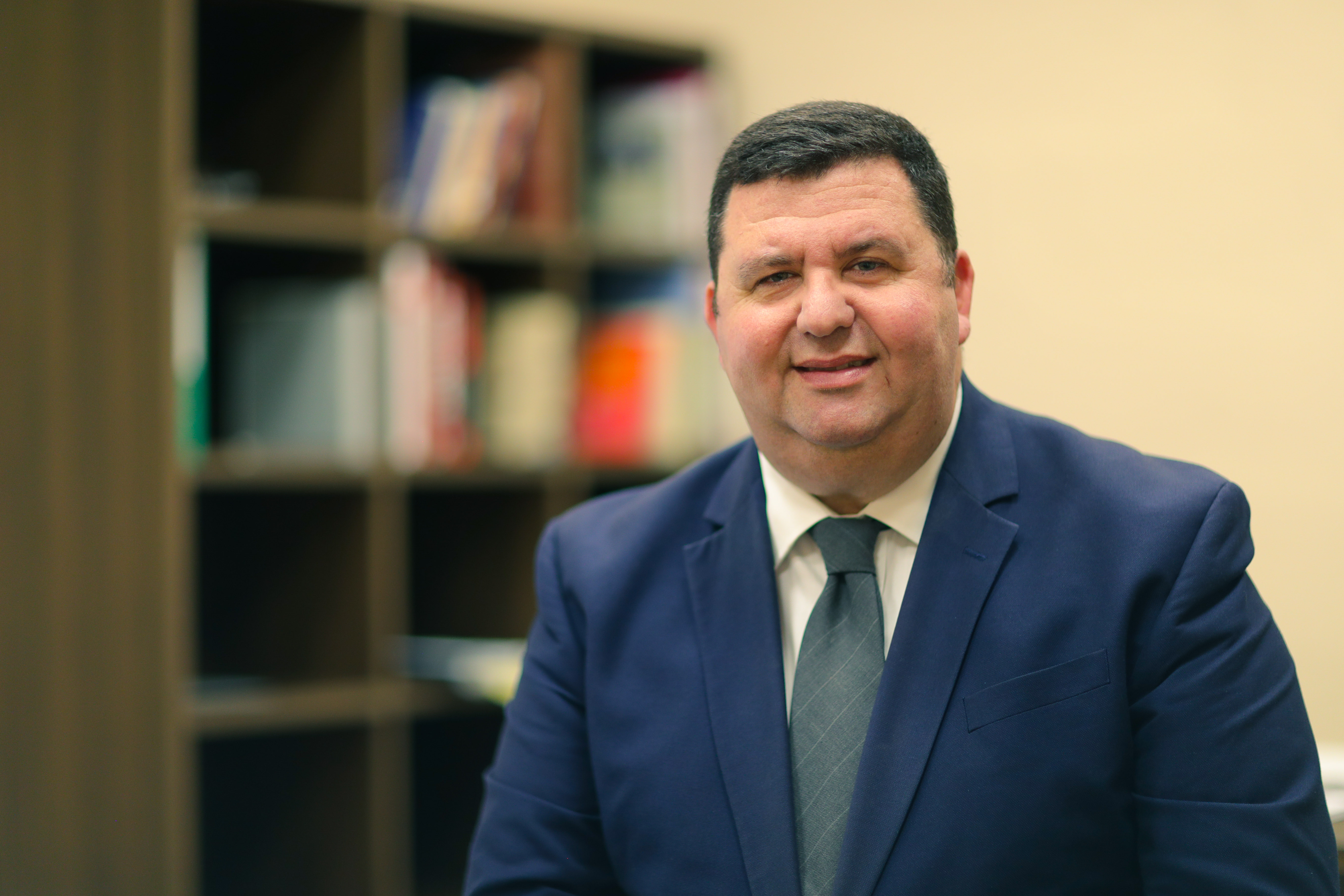

Member of the Maltese Parliament
- Incumbent
- Assumed office 21 June 2017

Parliamentary Secretary for Public Cleanliness
- In office 8 January 2024 – 4 June 2026
- Prime Minister: Robert Abela
- Minister: Miriam Dalli

Minister for Home Affairs and Security
- Incumbent
- Assumed office 4 June 2026
- Prime Minister: Robert Abela
- Preceded by: Byron Camilleri

Personal details
- Born: 15 November 1974 (age 51) Pietà, Malta
- Party: Labour (PL)
- Profession: Member of Parliament

Glenn Bedingfield (born 15 November 1974, Pietà, Malta) is a Member of the Parliament of Malta and Minister.
