= Cyrus Engerer =

Maltese politician

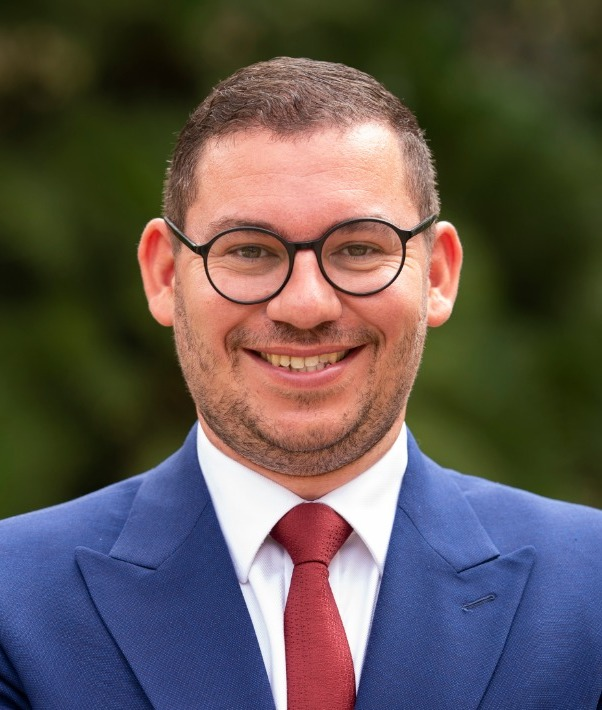
- Cyrus Engerer

Member of the European Parliament
- In office 5 November 2020 – 14 July 2024

Personal details
- Born: 28 September 1981 (age 45) Tas-Sliema, Malta
- Party: Independent (2024–current); Labour Party (2011–2024); Nationalist Party (2003–2011)
- Spouse: Randolph De Battista
- Education: College of Europe; University of Malta
- Known for: Civil Rights & Environmental Activist
- Committees: Committee on the Environment, Public Health and Food safety Committee on Civil Liberties, Justice and Home Affairs Constitutional Affairs Committee
- Website: cyrusengerer.com

Cyrus Engerer (born 28 September 1981) is a Maltese former member of European Parliament representing the Labour Party. A gay rights activist, he was a spokesperson for the Yes campaign at the 2011 Maltese divorce referendum. In 2021, he was tasked with negotiating the European Parliament's historic resolution on the declaration of the European Union as an LGBTQ Freedom zone, in reaction to the establishment of so called "LGBT-Free zones" in Poland. Engerer later went on to write the European Parliament's resolution which condemned the laws in Hungary which effectively banned "LGBT propaganda" in the vicinity of schools. From 2014 till 2019, Engerer was the Prime Minister's special envoy to the European Union. He was elected as a Member of the European Parliament in November 2020. After he joined the Labour Party, the Police of Malta opened an investigation against him, leading to his father's arrest, the opening of a court case against him on spreading pornography, and the arrest of his mother on election day. He himself was convicted for spreading revenge porn and received a suspended two years term imprisonment. He is the partner of Malta's Permanent Representative to the United Nations in Geneva, Ambassador Randolph De Battista.

== Early life and career ==
Engerer read an Honours Degree in European Studies and Communications at the University of Malta, graduating in 2007 with a dissertation on "The Role of the European Parliament: Developments, the Constitution and Future Prospects". He then obtained a Master's in European Politics from the College of Europe in Bruges, Belgium with a dissertation on 'Malta Europeanised: Political Parties and Electoral Campaigns'.

Upon graduation, Engerer was recruited at the Office of the Prime Minister Lawrence Gonzi as a project manager on EU-funded projects. He later joined the Malta-EU Steering and Action Committee (MEUSAC) and worked as an adviser on EU funds to various Ministries, local councils, and NGOs.

== Political career ==
In a highly polarised society, Engerer was raised in a politically mixed environment with his father being a traditional Nationalist supporter from Sliema, and his mother, from Valletta, being an activist in the Labour Party, with her family being ardent Mintoff supporters.

Engerer is known for his public stands on civil rights, Malta's national identity, and the protection of the environment.

=== Nationalist Party (2003–2011) ===
Engerer's first involvement in Maltese politics was related to Malta's accession to the European Union. Convinced that membership augmented Malta's opportunities for growth, he joined the Moviment IVA Malta fl-Ewropa and campaigned for Malta's EU membership during the accession referendum in 2003.

The same year, prompted by the party's positive stand on EU membership, Engerer joined the conservative Nationalist Party (PN).

At the 2009 administrative elections in Malta, Engerer was elected to the Sliema Local Council, third among ten candidates. Within the Council, he was given the remit on EU affairs, EU funding, youths, and sport. In 2010, Engerer was appointed deputy mayor of Sliema.

Engerer frequently criticised the Nationalist Party's conservative positions, especially on issues related to civil rights and liberties, while he also regularly questioned his party's democratic credentials. Commentators like Raphael Vassallo noted that his progressive views on divorce and gay rights would have made him more at ease in a European liberal party than in the traditionally conservative Nationalist Party. During the last PN General Council he attended, Engerer went as far as hinting that the Nationalist Party was cut off from society's realities.

==== 2011 Divorce referendum ====
During the referendum campaign for the introduction of divorce legislation in Malta in 2011, Engerer joined the Yes Movement Iva Għad-Divorzju, Iva Għaż-Żwieġ and was also the leading spokesperson for the Stand Up campaign.

The long referendum campaign not only brought the progressive voices together. but also led the country's conservative forces (including the Nationalist Party) to hold a joint campaign against divorce. Notwithstanding the religious pressure that was exerted by the Catholic Church on the Maltese population, the Yes campaign won 52.67% of the votes. Despite the electorate's clear vote, Prime Minister Lawrence Gonzi stated he would vote 'no' in parliament, against the will of the majority. The statement spurred Engerer to declare he would resign from the party's structures if its leader and Prime Minister did vote against the will of the Maltese. Engerer stated that "Lawrence Gonzi no longer represents the Maltese population, he has committed political suicide and if he has the country's and the party's interest at heart should resign immediately."

Gonzi ultimately voted against divorce, which led Engerer to resign from the Nationalist Party on 15 July 2011 and join the Labour Party led by Joseph Muscat, who had personally campaigned for the introduction of divorce legislation and other civil liberties.

=== Labour Party (2013) ===
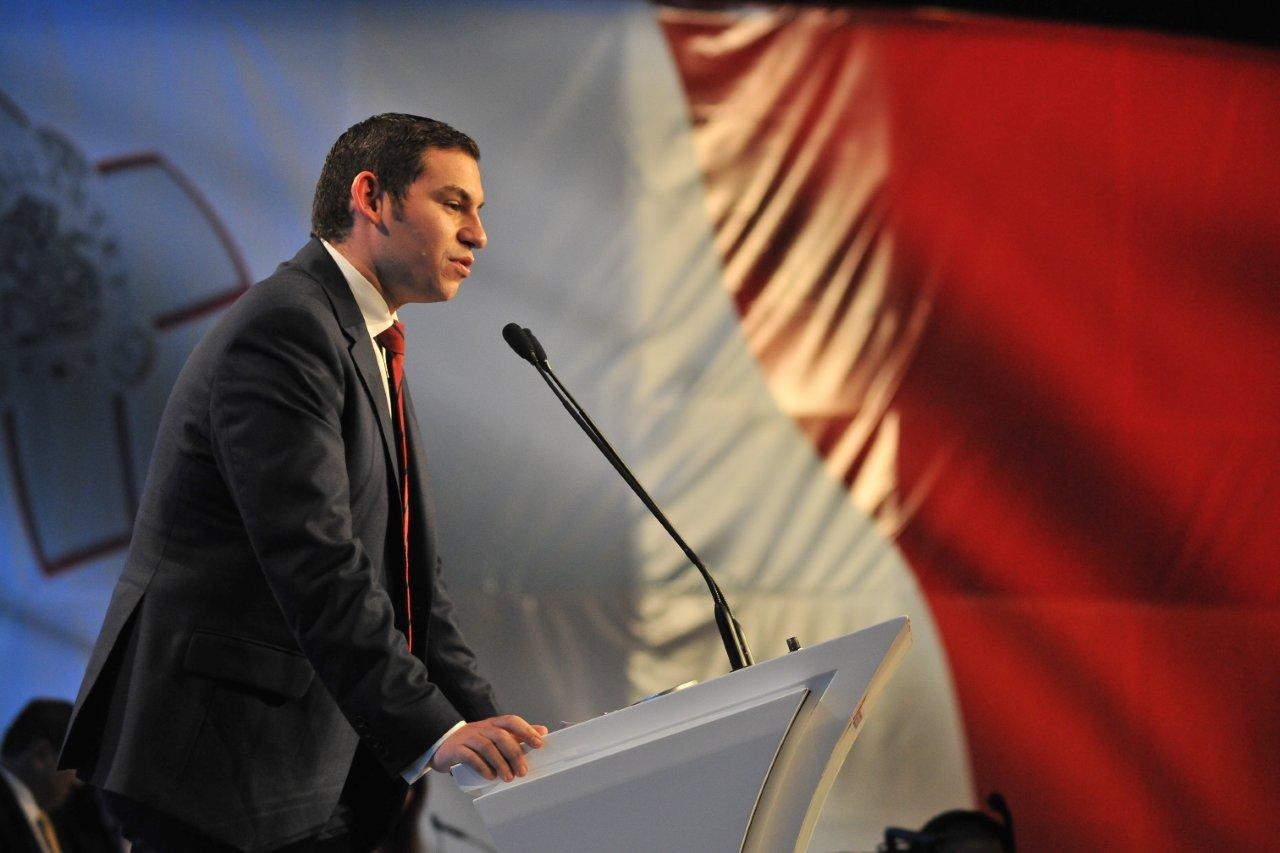
Cyrus Engerer addressing the Labour Party's 2013 Annual General Conference which launched the electoral manifesto themed Malta Taghna Lkoll

Engerer joined and became highly involved in the Labour Party. In July 2011, he became a board member of the party's think-tank Fondazzjoni IDEAT and one of its delegates to the party. He also formed part of LGBT Labour. Within the party, Engerer also spearheaded the fight for Civil Rights. His involvement was particularly prominent in the 2013 Labour Party campaign for the General Elections, where he worked hard to encourage former Nationalist voters to vote Labour. Labour won with a 54.83% majority.

Following her appointment as Minister for Social Dialogue, Consumer Affairs and Civil Liberties, Helena Dalli appointed Engerer as Chairperson of the Consultative Council for LGBT rights, with the initial task being to provide government with a Bill on Civil Unions as well as a Gender Identity Act. The Civil Union Act was presented to the Minister at the end of June, while the Gender Identity Act was presented at the beginning of August 2013.

The same year, Engerer joined the cabinet of the Parliamentary Secretary for the 2017 EU Presidency and EU Funding, Ian Borg.

==== European Parliament campaign (2013) ====
On 8 June 2013, Engerer announced that he would be contesting the 2014 European Parliament election in Malta. He submitted his nomination to Labour Party for the elections on 5 August 2013, getting support from Minister Evarist Bartolo, Minister Helena Dalli, Parliamentary Secretary Ian Borg, Member of Parliament Deborah Schembri, and Gozo Labour Party spokesperson Ġuża Cassar. Along with seven others, he was approved as a candidate by the party on 21 August 2013.

Engerer's campaign, called Malta l-Ewwel (Malta First), was launched in Valletta on 27 October 2013.

In the week following his switch to Labour Party, Engerer and members of his family were faced with multiple charges opened against them by the Police of Malta. Such charges included circulating pornographic pictures of his former partner. Although the government denied that any of the charges were politically motivated, a number of opinion-makers alleged that this was character-assassination of an opponent of the governing party. This version of events relied on the fact that internal police and court documents were leaked to the media before Engerer himself was informed of the charges by the police. An internal police inquiry later confirmed that the timing of the initiation of court proceedings was politically motivated.

On 31 May 2013, the Court of Justice presided by Magistrate Audrey Demicoli acquitted Engerer of all charges. However, he was sentenced to a two-year jail term suspended for two years on 8 May 2014. The decision was handed down by Mr Justice Michael Mallia in a 17-page appeals court judgment. The following day, Engerer announced that he had backed out of the European Parliament Elections 2014 citing that he did not want any bad light cast on the Labour Party.

==== Joseph Muscat's special envoy to the EU (2014–2019) ====
In October 2014, Engerer was appointed by Prime Minister Joseph Muscat as his "special envoy" to the European Union, in parallel to the official Permanent Representative of Malta to the EU sitting in Brussels' Dar Malta office. He kept the role until 2019.

==== Member of the European Parliament (2020) ====
Engerer ran on the Labour Party ticket at the 2019 European Parliament election in Malta and placed 5th from the Labour Party's list of candidates, with the party electing four Members.

When it became clear that Miriam Dalli would resign from her seat to be coopted to the Maltese Parliament, Engerer was elected on 5 November 2020.

== Publications ==
Engerer wrote a biography of the Labour Party leader, Prime Minister Joseph Muscat. The book, called Joseph, Malta li Rrid Ngħix Fiha, was published on 22 January 2013. It sold more than 10,000 copies in eight weeks and was well received by critics.
