= Evarist Bartolo =

Maltese politician

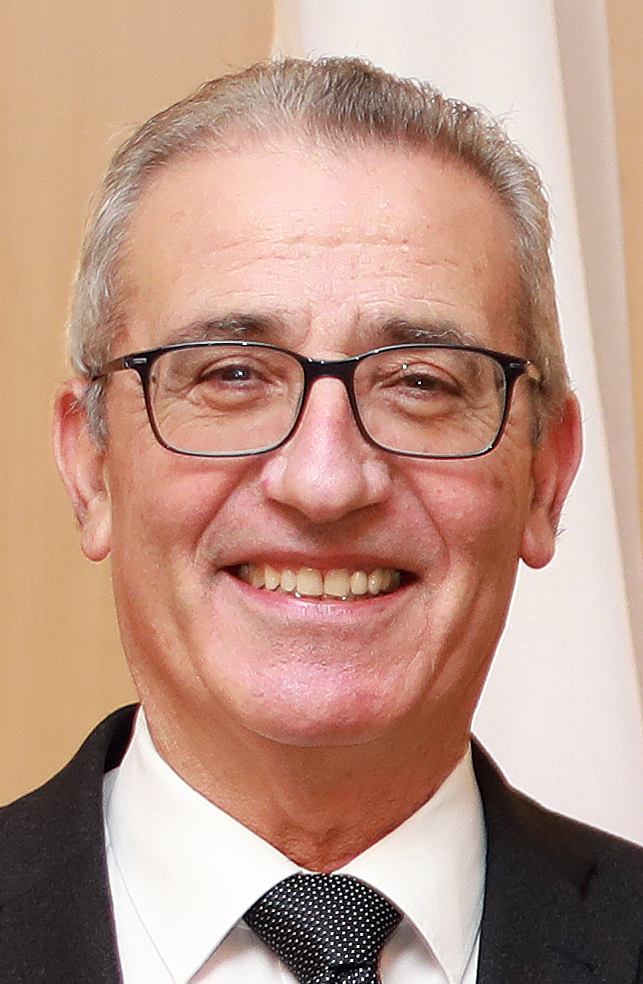

Minister for European and Foreign Affairs
- In office 15 January 2020 – 26 March 2022
- Prime Minister: Robert Abela
- Preceded by: Carmelo Abela; Responsible for Foreign Affairs & Trade Promotion
- Succeeded by: Ian Borg

Minister for Education and Employment
- In office 13 March 2013 – 15 January 2020
- Prime Minister: Joseph Muscat
- Preceded by: Dolores Cristina
- Succeeded by: Owen Bonnici

Member of Parliament
- In office 4 April 1992 – 26 March 2022

Minister for Education and National Culture
- In office 28 October 1996 – 6 September 1998
- Prime Minister: Alfred Sant
- Preceded by: Michael Falzon
- Succeeded by: Louis Galea

Personal details
- Born: 14 October 1952 (age 73) Mellieħa, Crown Colony of Malta
- Party: Labour (1984–present)
- Other political affiliations: Communist
- Spouse: Gillian Sammut
- Children: Katrine, Louisa
- Education: University of Malta; Stanford University; University of Cardiff
- Profession: Lecturer; Journalist
- Website: www.evaristbartolo.com Partit Laburista

Evarist Bartolo (born 14 October 1952) is a Maltese politician affiliated with the Labour Party and formerly the Minister for European & Foreign Affairs and the Minister for Education & Employment.

== Family ==
Bartolo was born on 14 October 1952 in Mellieħa, Crown Colony of Malta. Bartolo has three brothers and three sisters. His father worked as a primary school teacher. He is married to Gillian (née Sammut) and they have two daughters, Katrine and Louisa.

== Education ==
In 1975 Bartolo graduated from the University of Malta with a B.A. (Hons) degree in English Literature. In 1984 he was awarded a scholarship for a diploma course in journalism at Stanford University. He then read for a Master's in Education at the University of Cardiff which he completed in 1986.

== Career ==
Bartolo spent three years teaching at De La Salle College, another four years at the national broadcasting station and then a further ten years as the editor and head of news of the Labour Party media. He currently lectures in Communication Studies at the University of Malta. He has been a member in parliament since 1992, working mostly in education, European affairs and tourism. Between 1996 and 1998 he served as Minister of Education and National Culture under a Labour Government.

In the 2013 general elections he was once again elected from two districts, the 10th (Gżira, Pemboke, Sliema, St Julians) and the 12th (Mellieħa, St Paul's Bay and Naxxar) and was subsequently appointed Minister for Education and Employment. He was re-elected in the 2017 general election and re-appointed to the same role. Following the election of Robert Abela as Prime Minister, Bartolo was appointed Minister for Foreign and EU Affairs. He also contested the 2022 general election but was not elected and announced his retirement from politics.

== Political beliefs ==
Bartolo was raised in Mellieħa, a conservative, rural town in the north of Malta. As he himself points out, he had a very Roman Catholic upbringing and as a teenager used to teach the Bible to younger children. He was also very active in the Legion of Mary, the Catholic Action and the Young Christian Workers, organisations closely aligned to the Roman Catholic Church. In a country where political polarization is very strong and most individuals will identify with the party that they have been brought up with, Bartolo describes himself as one of those who chose a party upon the basis of an explicit attempt to understand which party best stood for the principles that he believed in. Bartolo states that the road that convinced him that his place was within the Labour Party was a long tortuous one during which he explored Karl Marx, Mohandas Gandhi, Vladimir Lenin, Martin Luther King Jr. and spent a year in Sicily working with an anti-Mafia activist Danilo Dolci.

Bartolo was one of the leading contenders for the Malta Labour Party leadership following the resignation of Alfred Sant who had been at the helm of the party since 1992.

Bartolo's moderate beliefs are seen by many as being the sort of views which will move the Labour Party from being perceived as a slightly outmoded traditional working class party to one that, within the new Maltese social realities, captures the support of emerging liberal elements within the middle classes while still remaining loyal to its working-class roots.

In August 2013, Bartolo nominated Cyrus Engerer within the Labour Party for the 2014 European Parliament elections.

He is irreligious.

Political offices
Preceded by Michael Falzon	Minister for Education and National Culture; 1996–1998	Succeeded by Louis Galea
Preceded by Dolores Cristina	Minister for Education and Employment; 2013–2020	Succeeded by Owen Bonnici
Preceded by Carmelo Abela	Minister of Foreign Affairs; 2020–2022	Succeeded by Ian Borg
