= Carmelo Abela =

Maltese politician (born 1972)

The Honourable Carmelo Abela MP
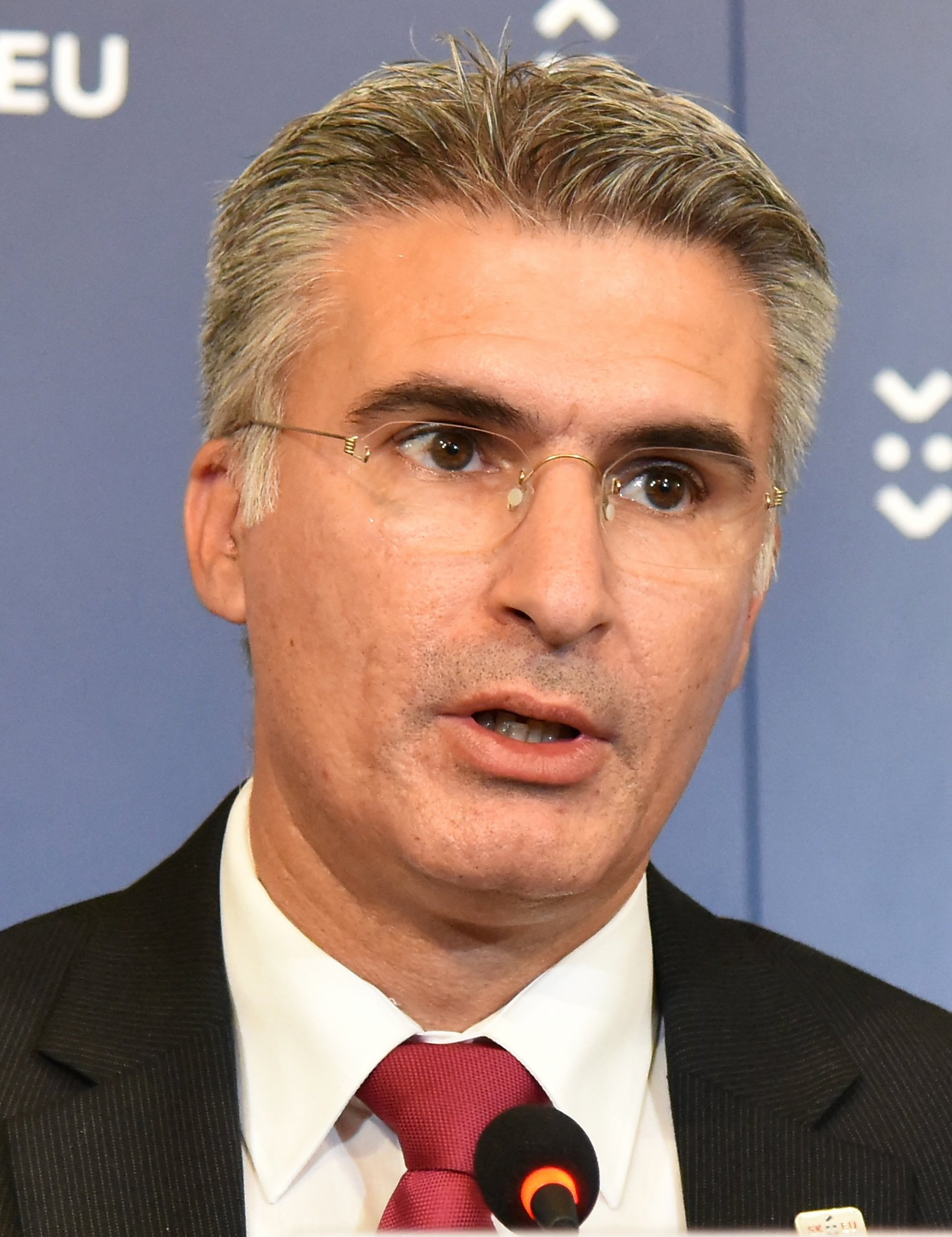
- Abela in 2016

Speaker of the House of Representatives
- Incumbent
- Assumed office 20 June 2026
- President: Myriam Spiteri Debono
- Prime Minister: Robert Abela
- Preceded by: Angelo Farrugia

Minister within the Office of the Prime Minister (OPM) (Social Dialogue and the Electoral Manifesto's Implementation)
- In office 15 January 2020 – 26 March 2022
- Prime Minister: Robert Abela
- Preceded by: Office Established

Minister for Foreign Affairs and Trade Promotion
- In office 9 June 2017 – 15 January 2020
- Prime Minister: Joseph Muscat
- Preceded by: George Vella
- Succeeded by: Evarist Bartolo; Responsible for European & Foreign Affairs

Minister for Home Affairs and National Security
- In office 9 December 2014 – 9 June 2017
- Prime Minister: Joseph Muscat
- Preceded by: Emmanuel Mallia
- Succeeded by: Michael Farrugia

Deputy Speaker of the House of Representatives of Malta
- In office 6 March 2003 – 8 May 2010
- Succeeded by: Ċensu Galea

Member of Parliament
- In office 5 December 1996 – 20 June 2026
- Succeeded by: Ray Abela
- Constituency: Third District

Personal details
- Born: 10 February 1972 (age 54) Malta
- Party: Labour Party
- Spouse: Melanie Bugeja
- Children: 2

Carmelo Abela MP (born 10 February 1972) is a Maltese politician and is serving as an incumbent Labour MP and was the Minister for Home Affairs and National Security. He also served as Minister for Foreign Affairs and Trade Promotion, and as Deputy Speaker of the House of Representatives of Malta. On 15 January 2020 he was appointed Minister within the OPM in Robert Abela's cabinet.

== Biography ==
Carmelo Abela was born on 10 February 1972 in Malta.

He won his first general election in 1996, when he was named to the 8th Parliament of Malta. He has since won in 1998, 2003, 2008, and 2013. He was elected Deputy Speaker of the Tenth Parliament on 6 March 2003 and re-appointed on 5 October 2008, resigning as speaker on 5 July 2010.

He has served as Government Whip in the Malta Legislature.

In December 2014, he became Minister for Home Affairs and National Security. As Home Affairs Minister, in January 2017 he stated that the government had “no plans” to extend Maltese citizenship to children born in Malta with migrant parents. Prior to 2001, all children born in Malta were entitled to citizenship, with the law changed to apply to only those born before 1989 in 2001. On 8 June 2017 he was elected Minister of Foreign Affairs and Trade Promotion.

== Criminal allegations ==
In January 2024, brothers Alfred and George Degiorgio who are currently serving a 40-year jail term each for their role in the assassination of journalist Daphne Caruana Galizia released a sworn declaration where they stated that Carmelo Abela had helped the mastermind of a botched 2010 HSBC bank robbery. Back in 2010, Carmelo Abela was an employee of the bank. Furthermore, lawyer Jason Azzopardi claimed that Abela had received a €300,000 payment for his role in the plot.

Abela categorically denied the allegations and sued Azzopardi for libel. Interestingly, Abela did not take any legal action against the Degiorgio brothers stating that they are criminals who have nothing to lose.

In March 2024, blogger and journalist Mark Camilleri further alleged that the Malta Police already have evidence against Carmelo Abela. This being a security card and a video of the bank insides, which Abela had given to the Degiorgio brothers in order to access the bank’s safe room where the money was located. Camilleri also stated that the Degiorgio brothers would not have accused Abela without the existence of the incriminating evidence in hand, since Abela would have easily belied them.

== Defamation case victory ==
On 30 September 2024, three and a half years after the allegations were made, the Court found Jason Azzopardi guilty of libel over the allegations and fined him €7,000. It was the view of the Court that the defendant failed to satisfy the requirement indicated in the Media and Defamation Act by failing to indicate, even in general, the basis of his statement that the plaintiff was the accomplice who helped the thieves in the commission of the crime by providing means, including fake keys, and was going to be compensated for this complicity.

Azzopardi appealed the sentence, however the Court of Appeal on June 25, 2025 confirmed the first sentence and rejected the appeal.

== Personal life ==
He and his wife Melanie have two children.

== See also ==
- List of current foreign ministers
- List of foreign ministers in 2017
- List of ministers for home affairs of Malta

Political offices
Preceded by Emmanuel Mallia	Minister for Home Affairs and National Security; 2014–2017	Succeeded by Michael Farrugia
Preceded by George Vella	Minister of Foreign Affairs; 2017–2020	Succeeded by Evarist Bartolo
