= Byron Camilleri =

Maltese politician and lawyer (born 1988)

Honorable Byron Camilleri MP
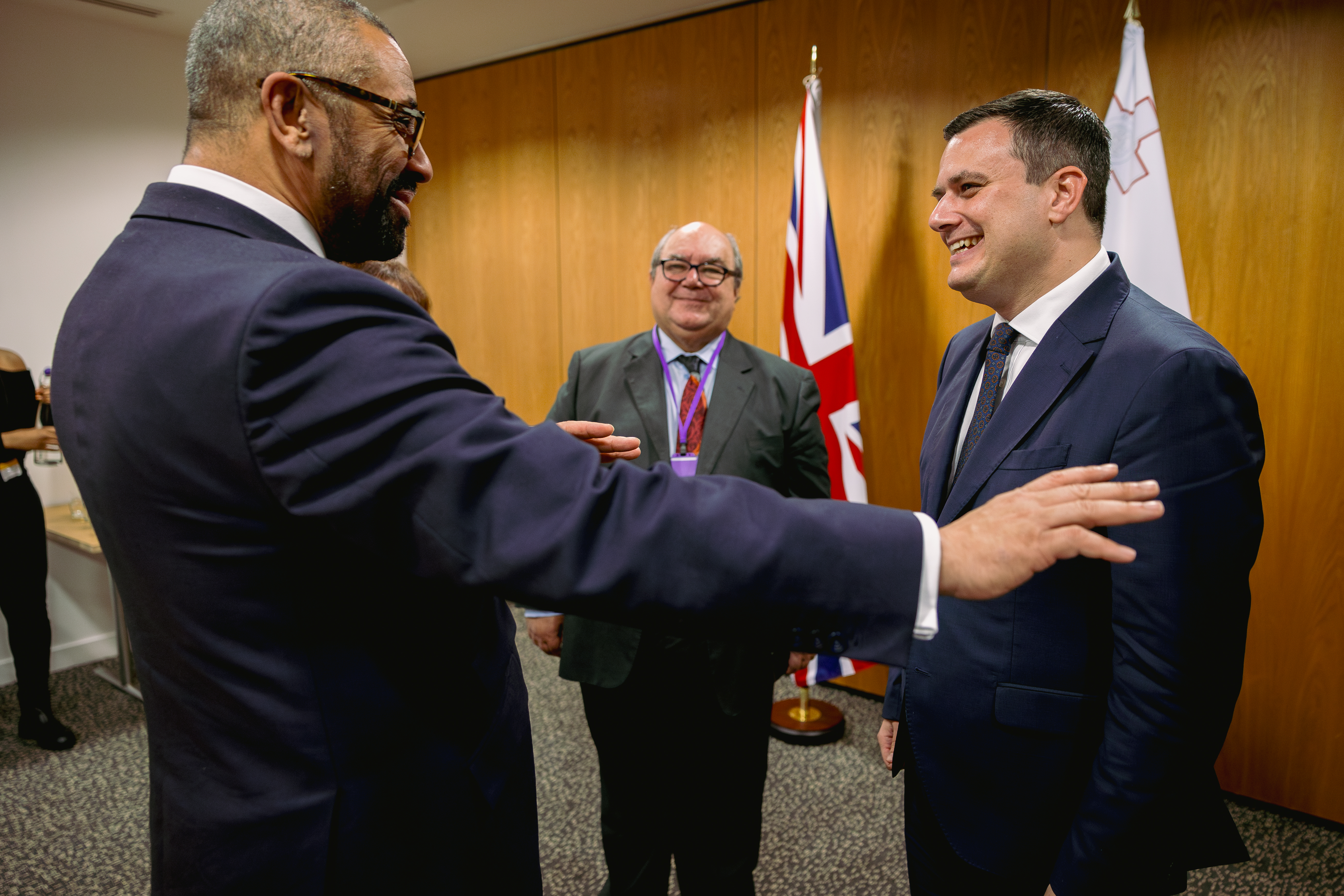
- Byron Camilleri being welcomed by the then British Home Secretary in 2024

Minister for Education and Sports
- Incumbent
- Assumed office 4 June 2026
- Prime Minister: Robert Abela
- Preceded by: Clifton Grima

Minister for Home Affairs, Security and Employment
- In office 15 January 2020 – 4 June 2026
- Prime Minister: Robert Abela
- Preceded by: Michael Farrugia
- Succeeded by: Glenn Bedingfield

Member of Parliament
- Incumbent
- Assumed office 24 June 2017
- Constituency: Fourth District

Mayor of Fgura
- In office 2010–2017
- Preceded by: Darren Marmarà
- Succeeded by: Pierre Dalli

Government Whip
- In office 9 June 2017 – 15 January 2020
- Prime Minister: Joseph Muscat; Robert Abela
- Preceded by: Glenn Bedingfield
- Succeeded by: Andy Ellul

Personal details
- Born: 28 January 1988 (age 38)
- Party: Partit Laburista
- Spouse: Salome Camilleri (née Catania)
- Children: 1
- Education: University of Malta
- Occupation: Lawyer; politician
- Committees: House Businesses, Privileges

Byron Camilleri MP (born 28 January 1988) is a Maltese lawyer and politician from the Labour Party serving in the Parliament of Malta. He has served as the mayor of Fgura from 2010 to 2017 and is now serving as Minister for Education and Sports.

== Political career ==
He was elected to the Thirteenth Legislature of Malta in the 2017 Maltese general election and served from 2017 to 2022, and was reelected in the 2022 Maltese general election to serve on the Fourteenth Legislature of Malta. He served as Government Whip between 2017 and 2020, when Robert Abela appointed him to Minister for Home Affairs, Law Enforcement and National Security. He was re-elected to Parliament in the 2022 Maltese General Elections, and was re-appointed Abela as Home Affairs minister, but with additional portfolios. He is now Minister for Home Affairs, Security, Reforms and Equality.

In July 2025, Camilleri was among several European officials declared "persona non grata" by the Government of National Stability in eastern Libya after he and the said officials held an earlier meeting with officials of the rival Government of National Unity based in Tripoli.

In 2026, Camilleri ran as a Labour Party candidate in Malta's 2026 general election, contesting Districts 2 and 4. He was subsequently elected from District 4 and managed to retain his seat in Parliament.

== Personal life ==
Camilleri has been in a relationship with Salome Catania since 2015. He proposed in April 2020 and the pair wed in July 2022. The couple have one daughter, Pippa, born on 29 August 2023.
