= Guido de Marco =

President of Malta from 1999 to 2004

His Excellency Guido de Marco KUOM
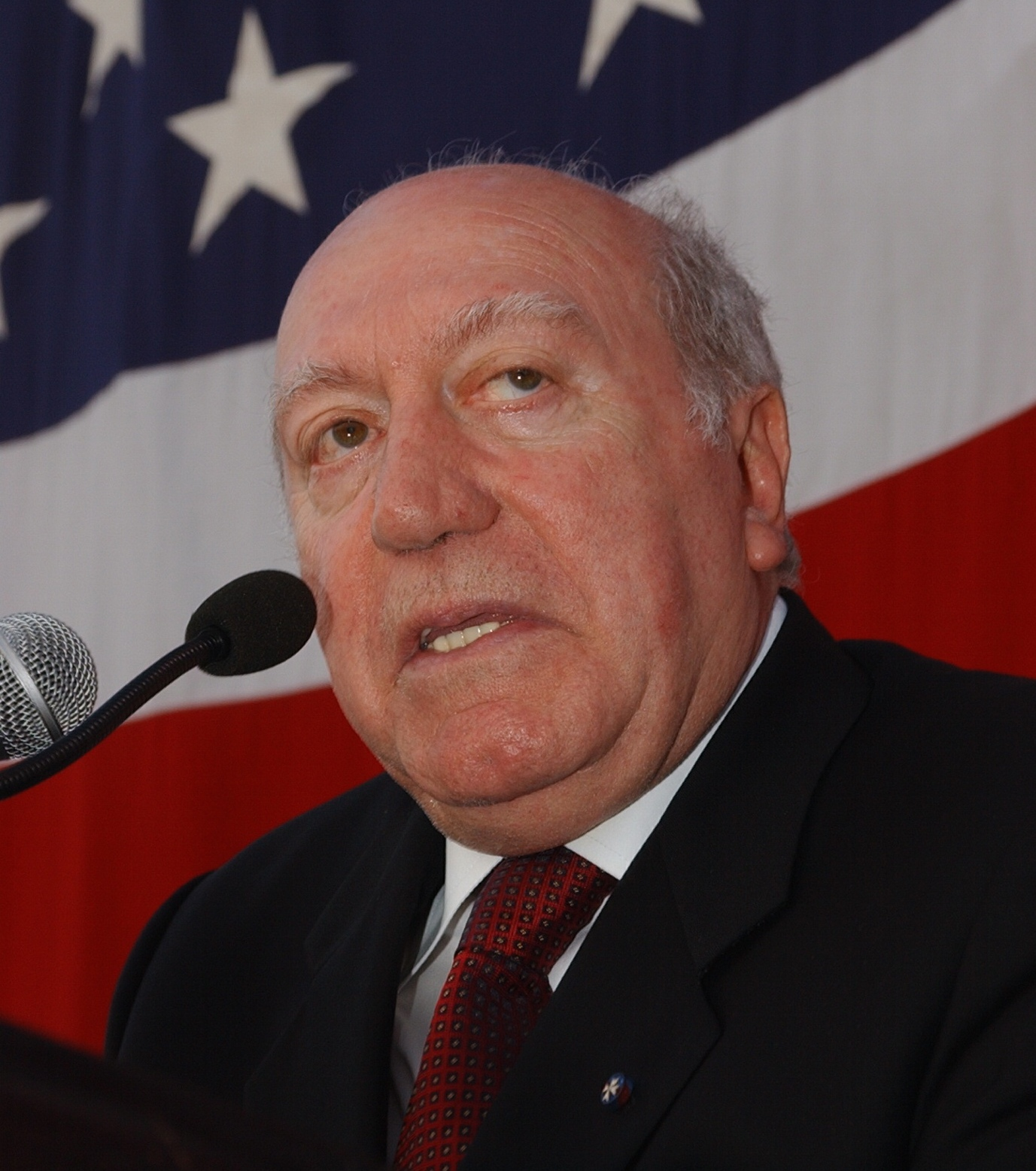
- De Marco in 2003

6th President of Malta
- In office 4 April 1999 – 4 April 2004
- Prime Minister: Eddie Fenech Adami; Lawrence Gonzi
- Preceded by: Ugo Mifsud Bonnici
- Succeeded by: Eddie Fenech Adami

7th Deputy Prime Minister of Malta
- In office September 6, 1998 – March 29, 1999
- Prime Minister: Eddie Fenech Adami
- Preceded by: George Vella
- Succeeded by: Lawrence Gonzi
- In office May 12, 1987 – October 28, 1996
- Prime Minister: Eddie Fenech Adami
- Preceded by: Guzé Cassar
- Succeeded by: George Vella

Minister of Justice
- In office May 12, 1987 – February 7, 1992
- Prime Minister: Eddie Fenech Adami
- Preceded by: Guzé Cassar
- Succeeded by: Joe Fenech

Minister of Home Affairs
- In office May 12, 1987 – May 5, 1990
- Prime Minister: Eddie Fenech Adami
- Preceded by: Karmenu Mifsud Bonnici
- Succeeded by: Ugo Mifsud Bonnici

President of the United Nations General Assembly
- In office 1990–1991
- Preceded by: Joseph Nanven Garba
- Succeeded by: Samir Shihabi

Personal details
- Born: 22 July 1931 Valletta, British Malta
- Died: 12 August 2010 (aged 79) Msida, Malta
- Resting place: Addolorata Cemetery
- Party: Nationalist
- Spouse: Violet Saliba (1956–2010; his death)
- Children: 3
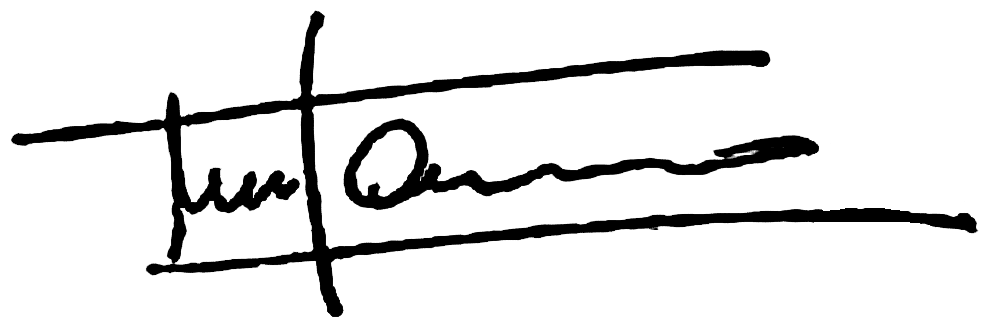
- Signature

Guido de Marco KUOM (22 July 1931 – 12 August 2010) was a Maltese politician, who served as the sixth president of Malta from 1999 to 2004. A noted statesman and lawmaker, de Marco also served as Deputy Prime Minister, Minister of the Interior, Justice, and Minister for Foreign Affairs.

He was elected President of the 45th session of the United Nations General Assembly in 1990, and Chairman of the Commonwealth Foundation in 2004. A renowned criminal lawyer, he defended some of the landmark cases in Malta during the 1980s. His sudden death in 2010 shocked the nation and prompted three days of national mourning and a state funeral.

== Early life and family ==
Guido de Marco was born in Valletta to Emanuele and Giovanna (née Raniolo) de Marco. He was educated at St. Joseph High School, St. Aloysius' College and the University of Malta. He obtained a Bachelor of Arts degree in Philosophy, Economics and Italian in 1952, becoming a Doctor of Laws in 1955.

De Marco and his future wife, Violet Saliba, met as students. He proposed to her on February 5, 1951, as he walked her home from Valletta to Pietà. De Marco and Violet Saliba married in 1956; the couple had three children: Giannella, Fiorella and Mario. Mario, who served as parliamentary secretary for tourism at the time of his father's death, said he was a family man who devoted time to his children and grandchildren.

== Political career ==
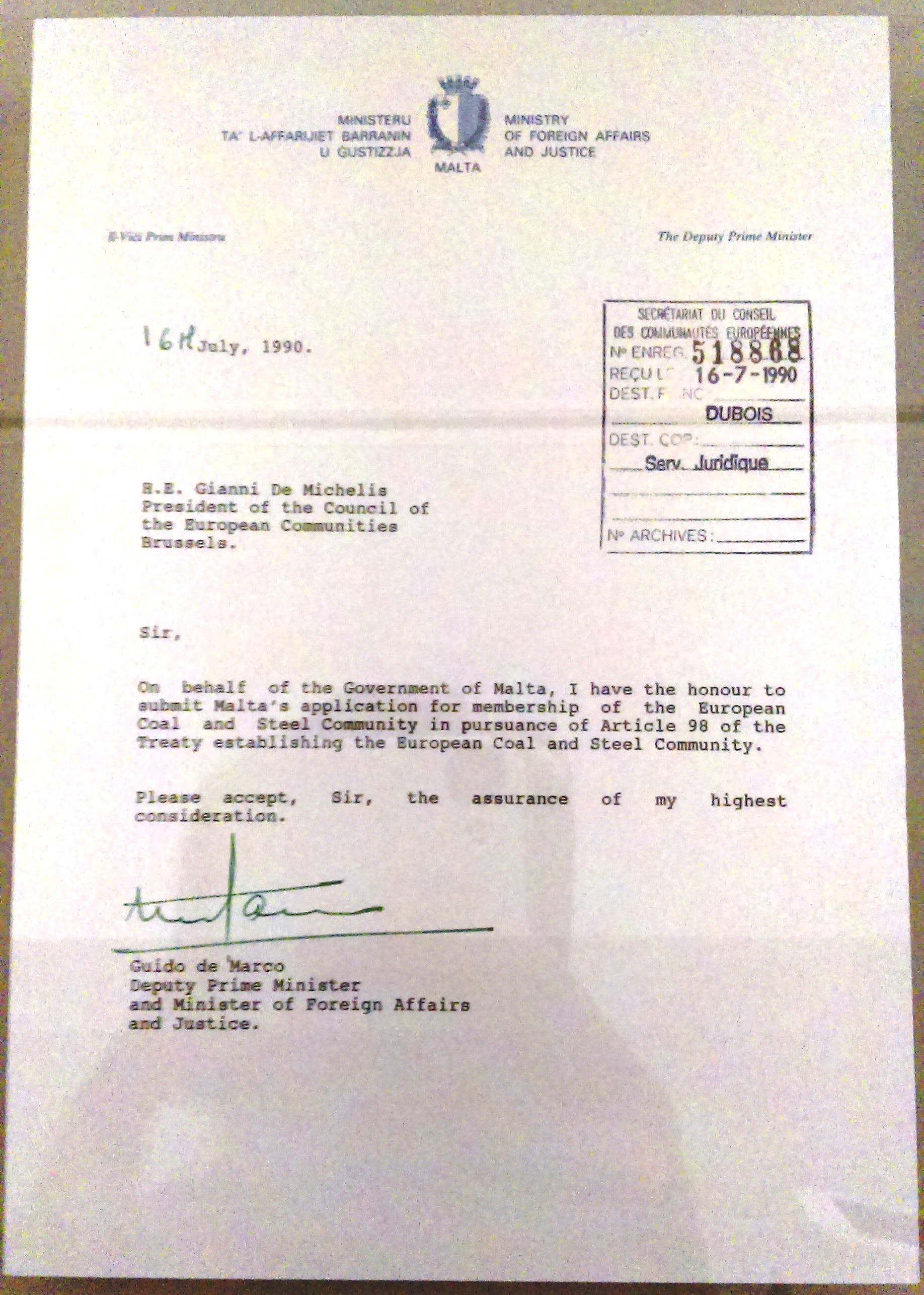
Letter of application for membership of the European Economic Community by Malta, 1990. Sent from the Maltese foreign affairs minister Guido de Marco to the Italian foreign affairs ministers Gianni De Michelis, at the time holding the rotating presidency of the EU Council. Held at the House of European History in Brussels

In 1962, de Marco resigned from his position at the Attorney General's Office, entering the political arena to later contest at the 1966 Maltese general election. The successful criminal lawyer would henceforth dedicate much of his life to the Nationalist and Maltese cause. He became a lecturer, and later a professor of criminal law at the University of Malta.

His political career began with his election to the House of Representatives in 1966. He was returned to Parliament at every general election he contested up to 1998. He was appointed secretary general of the Nationalist party in 1972 and became the party's deputy leader in 1977. He was elected as a representative at the Parliamentary Assembly of the Council of Europe of 1967, remaining a member for almost twenty years. During his career as Minister for the Interior and Justice, De Marco's efforts led to the integration into domestic law of important international conventions, particularly the European Convention on Human Rights. As Minister for the Interior, he pioneered the reforms and modernisations in the Police Force, being instrumental in the founding of the Police Academy.

As Minister for Foreign Affairs he submitted Malta's application for membership of the European Communities. It was one of his first acts as Minister for Foreign Affairs, occurring on 16 July 1990. He was a major player in the consolidation of Malta's contributions to international organisations, including the United Nations, the Organization for Security and Co-operation in Europe, the Council of Europe and the Commonwealth of Nations. In 1990 he also served as President of the United Nations General Assembly.

== Presidency ==
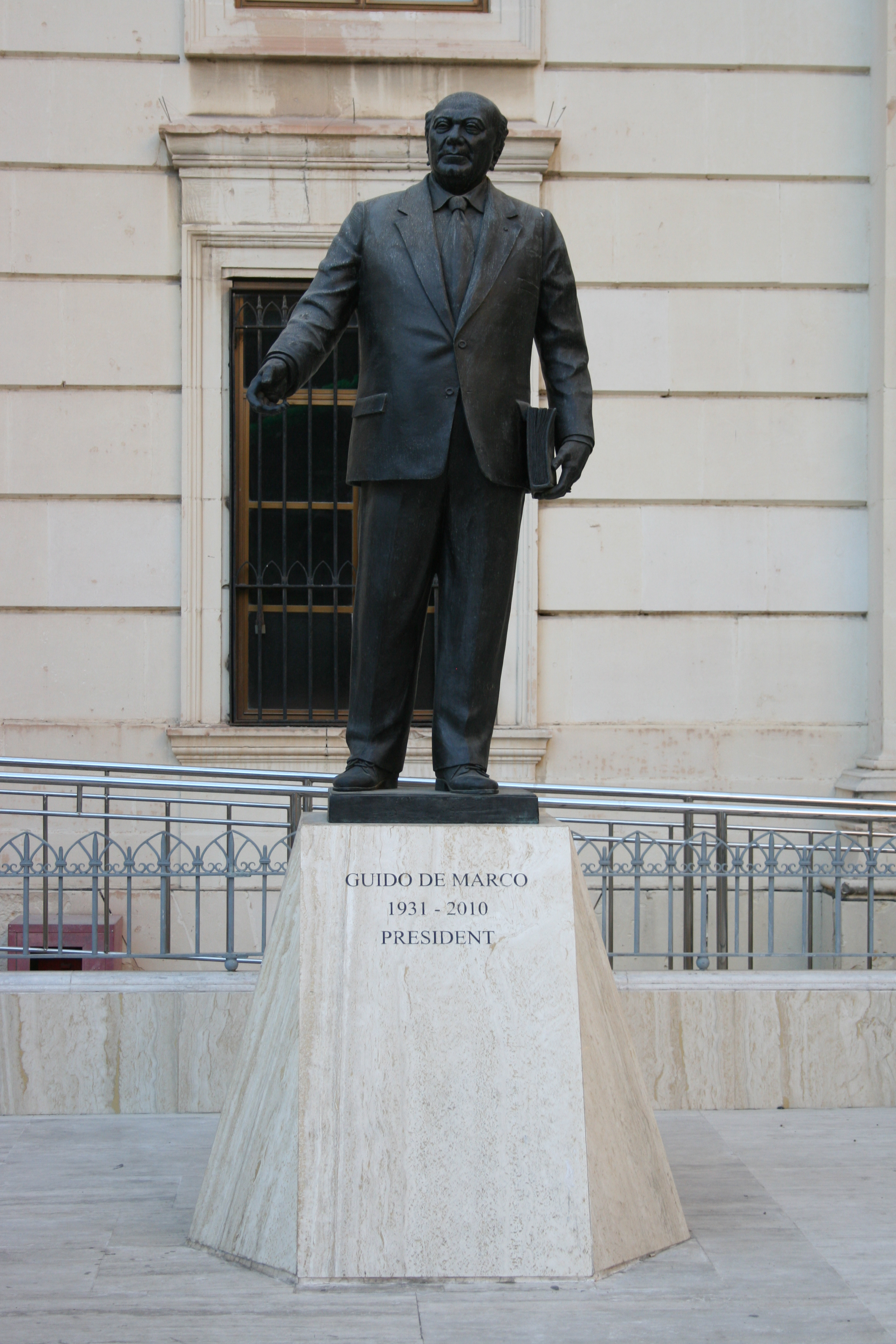
Memorial for Guido de Marco in Valletta

On 4 April 1999, de Marco was appointed President of Malta. He led his country into the European Union in 2004.

He became an honorary doctor at St. Petersburg State University in 2004 "for achievements in science and politics, in particular, for his efforts to integrate Malta into the EU."

== Declining health and death ==
On 5 August 2010, de Marco underwent an angioplasty to widen an obstructed heart artery. The intervention developed complications which led him to a critical, but stable condition. A series of medical bulletins were issued immediately by the medical team at Mater Dei Hospital, stating that De Marco was responding to treatment and showing signs of improvement. His condition continued to improve by the hour, to the extent of being taken off life-support machines. Five days later he was discharged from Mater Dei Hospital, but monitored closely by the medical team.

On 12 August 2010, de Marco gave an interview with Maltese newspaper Times of Malta, in which he said: "When I came round from the coma I no longer felt I was going to die. I felt I was going to remain. I'm here to stay... for now at least." de Marco collapsed at his home in Sliema shortly after conducting the interview at 3:30 p.m. and was rushed to Mater Dei Hospital, where he was pronounced dead on arrival.

News of de Marco's death shocked the nation, which was at the moment relieved with the previous improvement in his condition. The government declared three days of national mourning. A state funeral was held on Monday, August 16, 2010.

Messages of solidarity and expressions of sorrow were issued immediately by the President of the Republic, the Nationalist Party, the Labour Party, as well as from other entities and the diplomatic corps. The Maltese prime minister Lawrence Gonzi, interrupted his vacation to return to the island. Gonzi declared that "Malta lost one of the most prominent politicians in recent times. He was fundamental for the country's independence, contributed to strengthening democracy, served very important roles in strengthening our country's international relations and occupied important roles in the United Nations. His Presidency has united the country." Opposition leader Joseph Muscat called the death "a national loss." Edward Fenech Adami, De Marco's successor as President of Malta, was said to be "shaken" by the news, hailing De Marco as "a protagonist in the past forty to fifty years of Maltese history." Fenech Adami's successor, George Abela, President of Malta at the time of de Marco's death, added that "Academically, [Guido de Marco] definitely excelled," calling him a "jovial person...[who]...sang along throughout the recent Joseph Calleja concert." Abela expressed his condolences personally to the De Marco family at Mater Dei Hospital.

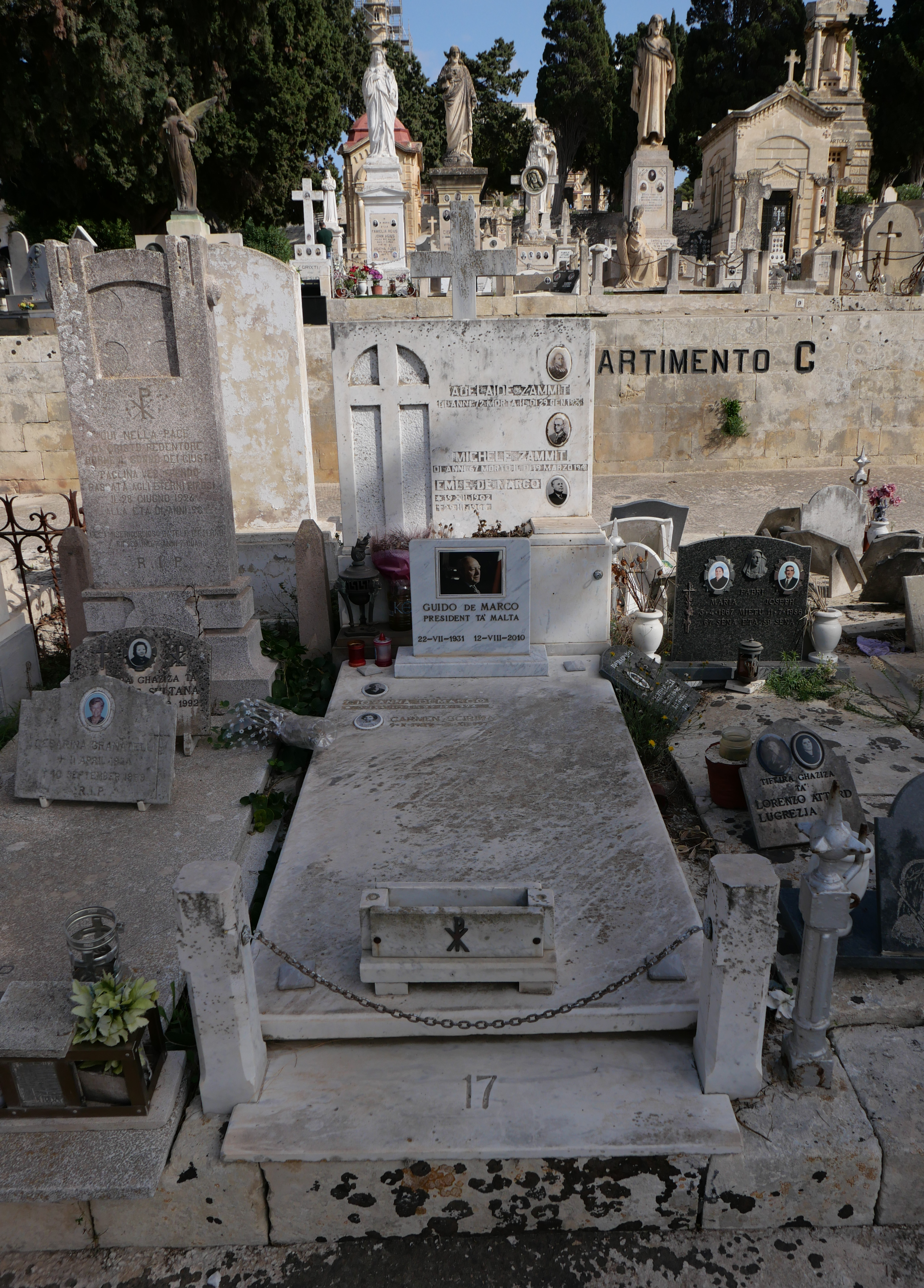
The grave of de Marco at the Addolorata Cemetery in Paola.

Tributes flowed into Malta from abroad. President of the European Parliament Jerzy Buzek called him "a highly respected politician and statesman ... who was deeply respected all over Europe." Former Libyan ambassador to Malta Saad Elshlmani said "On a personal level he was more than just a friend," adding that "people in the Middle East will remember him for his great attachment to the issues of tolerance, cooperation and friendship." United States ambassador Douglas Kmiec also issued a statement: "His tenure as President of the United Nations General Assembly, and his skill and perseverance in guiding Malta to EU membership are great tributes to his statesmanship."

His funeral took place on 16 August 2010, attended by dignitaries, including Kuwaiti Prime Minister Nasser Mohammed Al-Ahmed Al-Sabah, the widow of Palestinian Authority President Yasser Arafat, Suha Arafat, Italian Undersecretary for Foreign Affairs, Vincenzo Scotti, and several ambassadors.

== Honours ==
=== National honours ===
- Companion of Honour of the National Order of Merit, by right as President of Malta

=== Foreign honours ===
Ribbon	Distinction	Country	Date	Ref.
	Knight Grand Cross of the Order of Pope Pius IX	Holy See	31 January 1995	
	Order of Stara Planina with Ribbon	Bulgaria	9 March 2001	
	Collar of the Order of the Cross of Terra Mariana	Estonia	24 April 2001	
	Grand Cross Special Class of the Order of Merit of the Federal Republic of Germany	Germany	6 November 2001	
	Gold Medal of the Order of Freedom of the Republic of Slovenia	Slovenia	2002	
	Grand Cross of the Order of Merit of the Republic of Poland	Poland	28 October 2002	
	Collar of the Order of the White Star	Estonia	27 September 2003	
	Knight Grand Cross with Collar of the Order of Merit of the Italian Republic	Italy	16 January 2004	
	Grand Cross of the Order of the Three Stars	Latvia	10 February 2004	
	Order of Merit, 1st Class	Ukraine	21 August 2007	
	Grand Cross of the Order of Isabella the Catholic	Spain	6 July 2009	

Diplomatic posts
Preceded by Joseph Nanven Garba	President of the United Nations General Assembly; 1990–1991	Succeeded by Samir S. Shihabi
Political offices
Preceded by Guze Cassar	Deputy Prime Minister; 1987–1996	Succeeded by George Vella
Preceded by George Vella	Deputy Prime Minister; 1998–1999	Succeeded by Lawrence Gonzi
Preceded by Ugo Mifsud Bonnici	President of Malta; 1999–2004	Succeeded by Edward Fenech Adami
