= George Vella =

President of Malta from 2019 to 2024

His Excellency George Vella KUOM KCMG
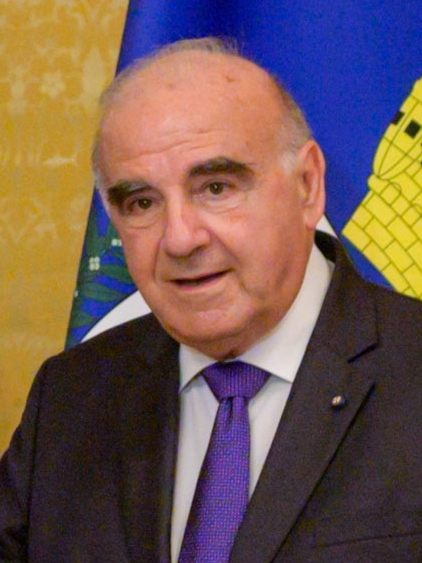
- Vella in 2022

10th President of Malta
- In office 4 April 2019 – 4 April 2024
- Prime Minister: Joseph Muscat; Robert Abela
- Preceded by: Marie-Louise Coleiro Preca
- Succeeded by: Myriam Spiteri Debono

Deputy Prime Minister of Malta
- In office 28 October 1996 – 6 September 1998
- Prime Minister: Alfred Sant
- Preceded by: Guido de Marco
- Succeeded by: Guido de Marco

Minister for Foreign Affairs
- In office 13 March 2013 – 9 June 2017
- Prime Minister: Joseph Muscat
- Preceded by: Francis Zammit Dimech
- Succeeded by: Carmelo Abela
- In office 28 October 1996 – 6 September 1998
- Prime Minister: Alfred Sant
- Preceded by: Guido de Marco
- Succeeded by: Guido de Marco

Deputy Leader of the Labour Party
- In office 26 March 1992 – 23 May 2003
- Leader: Alfred Sant
- Preceded by: Joseph Brincat
- Succeeded by: Charles Mangion

Personal details
- Born: 24 April 1942 (age 84) Żejtun, Crown Colony of Malta
- Party: Labour
- Spouse: Miriam Grima (m. 1985)
- Children: 3
- Education: University of Malta

George William Vella KUOM KCMG (born 24 April 1942) is a Maltese politician who served as the tenth president of Malta from 2019 to 2024. A member of the Labour Party, he previously served as deputy prime minister of Malta and foreign affairs minister from 1996 to 1998 under prime minister Alfred Sant. In 2013, he returned as foreign affairs minister, an office he held until 2017 under prime minister Joseph Muscat.

== Early life and family ==
Vella was born in Żejtun on 24 April 1942, where he finished his primary education. Vella graduated from the Faculty of Medicine and Surgery in the Royal University of Malta in 1964 and became a qualified medical doctor. He obtained a certificate in Aviation Medicine from Farnborough, UK and he has been a specialist in family medicine since 2003. Between 1964 and 1966, Vella worked as a houseman in St. Luke's Hospital and soon after he applied and worked between 1966 and 1973 as a medical officer for Malta's drydocks. After that, he served as the medical officer to Air Malta and as a consultant in Aviation Medicine.

He is married to Miriam and they together have two daughters and a son, along with seven grandchildren.

== Career ==
=== Labour Party ===
Vella joined the Labour Party and started his parliamentary career in 1976. He was then elected member of parliament in January 1978, and during the 1981, 1992, 1996, 1998, 2003, 2008 and 2013 general elections. As a member of Parliament, he represents the 3rd and 5th Districts.

In 1978, Vella was a substitute member of the Parliamentary Assembly of the Council of Europe and rapporteur on maritime pollution from maritime sources at the Conference of Local and Regional Authorities of Europe (CLRAE). From January to May 1987, he served as Malta's permanent representative at the Council of Europe.

In 1992, Vella was elected as the Labour Party deputy leader for parliamentary affairs and spokesperson on foreign affairs and served that role until 2003. He served as vice-chairman on the Joint EU/Malta Parliamentary Committee. From 1995 to 1996, Vella was a member of the House Business Committee and the Foreign Affairs Parliamentary Committee.

=== Deputy Prime Minister and Minister of Foreign Affairs ===
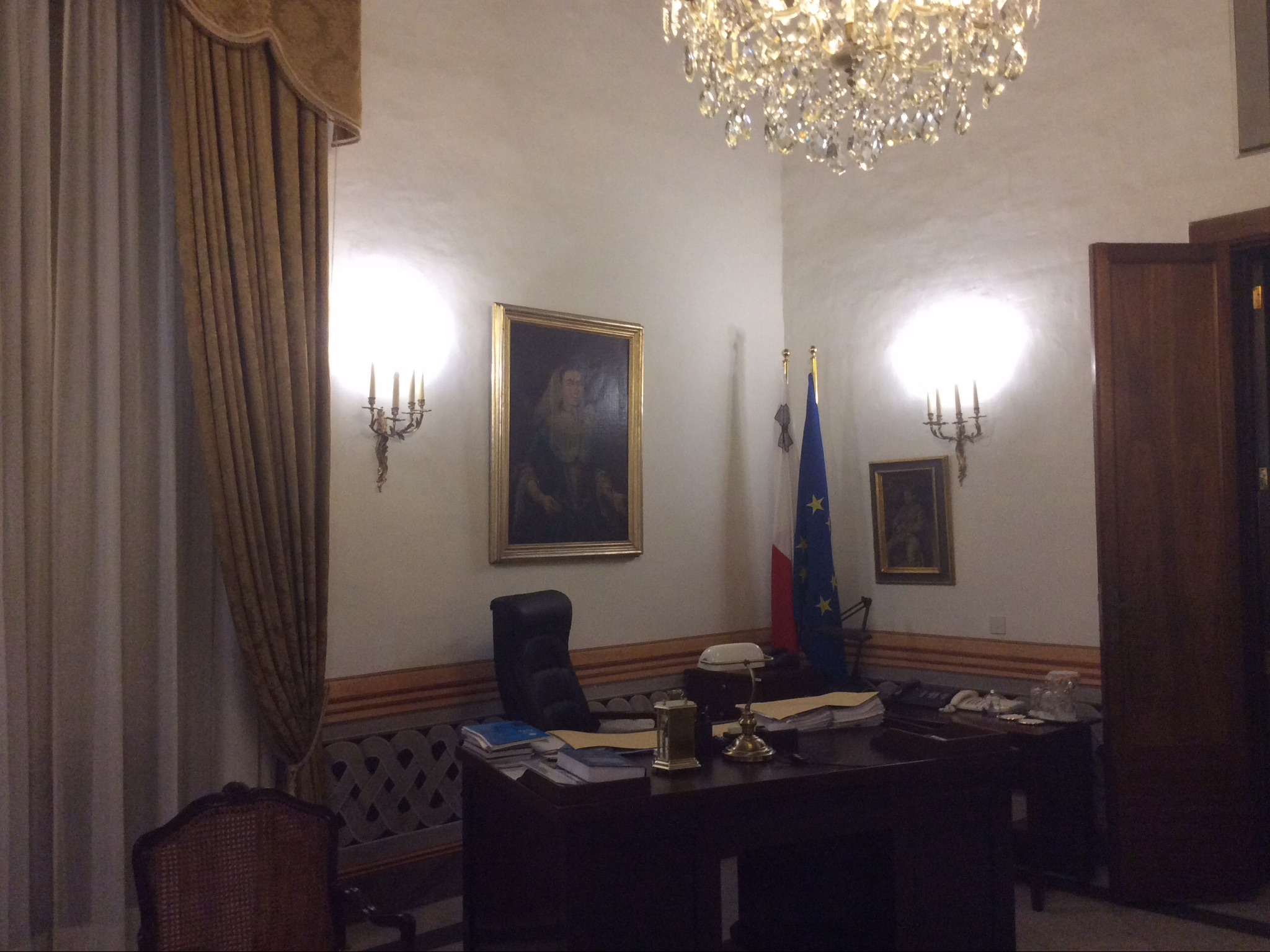
The office of Vella while serving as Deputy Prime Minister and Minister for Foreign Affairs

He was appointed deputy prime minister and minister for foreign affairs and environment in October 1996 and again in March 2013, serving to June 2017.

Vella has voiced his support for the Campaign for the Establishment of a United Nations Parliamentary Assembly, an organisation which campaigns for democratic reformation of the United Nations, and the creation of a more accountable international political system.

=== President of Malta ===
In early 2019, Vella was speculated to become the next president of Malta. Vella was nominated for the position of the president of Malta by the governing Labour Party at the time including the opposition Nationalist Party. The Democratic Party announced their support for Vella's nomination, but would boycott the vote to protest in favour of a constitutional amendment requiring a two-thirds majority to elect the president. The vote in parliament took place on 2 April 2019, with the Members of Parliament voting to approve Vella's appointment as the only nominee. The appointment was followed by Vella's formal swearing-in as president on 4 April 2019, a date on which every previous Maltese President since 1989 was inaugurated.

== Honours ==
=== National honours ===
- Companion of the National Order of Merit (KOM)
- Grand Master and Companion of Honour of the National Order of Merit, Malta, by right as a President of Malta
- Grand Master of the Xirka Ġieħ ir-Repubblika

=== Foreign honours ===
- Greece:
  - Grand Cross of the Order of the Redeemer (5 July 2023)
  - Grand Commander of the Order of Honour
- Italy:
  - Knight Grand Cross with Collar of the Order of Merit of the Italian Republic (18 March 2024)
- Latvia:
  - Commander Grand Cross with Chain of the Order of the Three Stars (1 February 2024)
- San Marino:
  - Knight Grand Cross of the Order of Saint Agatha
- United Kingdom:
  - Honorary Knight Commander of the Order of St Michael and St George
- Sovereign Military Order of Malta:
  - Grand Cross pro merito melitensi of the Order pro Merito Melitensi

=== Armorial bearings ===
Coat of arms of George Vella
Notes Granted on 4 April 2020 (by the Office of the Chief Herald of Arms of Malta). Crest An arm proper vambraced Argent holding in its hand a staff Or from which flies a pennant Argent bearing a Greek cross Vert. Escutcheon Azure upon a base barry wavy of three Argent a single masted galley in full sail Or rigged of the Same, flying a pennant of the Second its sail chequy of the Last and Sable. Supporters A pair of cherubs proper likewise crined, winged Argent and vested around the loins Gules, that at dexter holding in his exterior hand a map of the world that at sinister a rod of Aesculapius Or with serpent Vert. Motto SERVITOR ET PRAEFECTUS (Latin for 'Servant and overseer'). Orders National Order of Merit (Malta), Xirka Ġieħ ir-Repubblika, Order of St Michael and St George, and Order pro Merito Melitensi.

== See also ==
- List of foreign ministers in 2017
- List of foreign ministers in 2016

Party political offices
Preceded by Joseph Brincat	Deputy Leader of the Labour Party; 1992–2003	Succeeded by Charles Mangion
Political offices
Preceded by Guido de Marco	Deputy Prime Minister of Malta; 1996–1998	Succeeded by Guido de Marco
Preceded by Guido de Marco	Minister of Foreign Affairs; 1996–1998	Succeeded by Guido de Marco
Preceded by ???	Minister for the Environment; 1996–1998	Succeeded by Francis Zammit Dimech
Preceded by Francis Zammit Dimech	Minister of Foreign Affairs; 2013–2017	Succeeded by Carmelo Abela
Preceded by Marie-Louise Coleiro Preca	President of Malta; 2019–2024	Succeeded by Myriam Spiteri Debono
