= Ian Borg =

Maltese politician (born 1986)

The Honourable Ian Borg MP
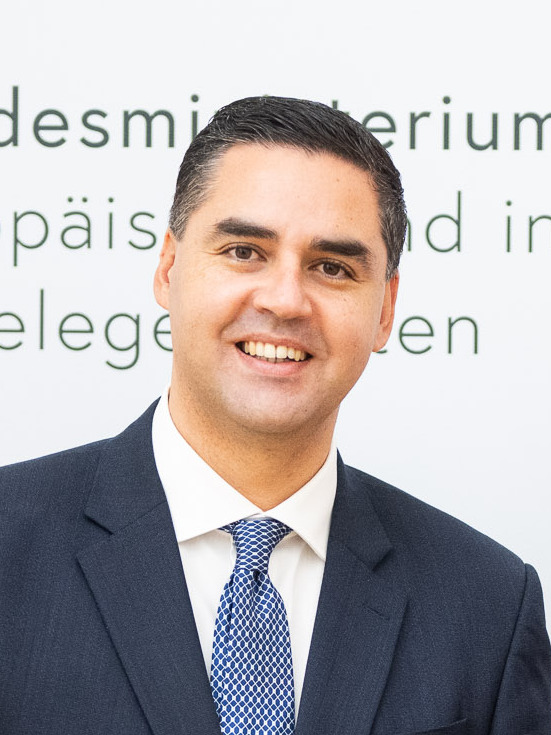
- Borg in 2023

Deputy Prime Minister of Malta
- Incumbent
- Assumed office 17 September 2024
- President: Myriam Spiteri Debono
- Prime Minister: Robert Abela
- Preceded by: Chris Fearne

Minister for Health
- Incumbent
- Assumed office 4 June 2026
- Prime Minister: Robert Abela
- Preceded by: Jo Etienne Abela
Ministerial offices 2013‍–‍2026
Minister for Foreign and European Affairs and Trade
In office 30 March 2022 – 4 June 2026
Prime Minister	Robert Abela
Preceded by	Evarist Bartolo
Succeeded by	Chris Fearne
Minister for Transport, Infrastructure and Capital Projects
In office 8 June 2017 – 26 March 2022
Prime Minister	Joseph Muscat; Robert Abela
Preceded by	Joe Mizzi
Succeeded by	Aaron Farrugia
Parliamentary Secretary for the EU Presidency 2017 and EU Funds
In office 13 March 2013 – 3 June 2017
Prime Minister	Joseph Muscat

Deputy Leader of the Labour Party Parliamentary Affairs
- Incumbent
- Assumed office 10 May 2024
- Preceded by: Chris Fearne

Member of the Parliament of Malta
- Incumbent
- Assumed office 10 March 2013
- Constituency: Seventh District

Personal details
- Born: 28 February 1986 (age 40) Pietà, Malta
- Party: Partit Laburista
- Spouse: Rachelle Borg Dingli
- Children: 1
- Education: University of Malta

Ian Borg MP (born 1986) is a Maltese politician currently serving as Deputy Prime Minister and Minister for Health.

== Early life and education ==
Ian Borg was born and raised in Dingli, Malta. His early interest in public service and governance led him to pursue a legal education. He was graduated from the University of Malta in 2012 after having successfully completed a Doctoral Degree in Laws, a Diploma in Public Notarial Practice, and a Bachelor’s Degree in Law.

== Personal life ==
He is married to Rachelle Borg Dingli, and they are parents to Eve. He is also noticeable for his height, he is approximately 195 cm (6 ft. 5).

== Political career ==
=== Mayor of Dingli ===
In 2005, at just 19 years old, he was elected Mayor of Dingli, becoming one of the youngest mayors in Malta's history. His tenure as mayor was marked by a commitment to local development and community engagement. He was re-elected in 2008 and again in 2012, serving until 2013 when he transitioned to national politics.

=== Parliamentary Secretary for the EU Presidency 2017 and EU Funds ===
In 2013, being the youngest member of the Cabinet, Borg was appointed Parliamentary Secretary for the EU Presidency 2017 and EU Funds within the Office of the Prime Minister, a role in which he was responsible for overseeing Malta’s presidency of the Council of the European Union and managing the country's EU funds. His leadership was instrumental in Malta achieving a 100% absorption rate of EU funds for the 2007-2013 programming period.

=== Minister for Transport, Infrastructure, and Capital Projects ===
In 2017, Borg was appointed Minister for Transport, Infrastructure, and Capital Projects. During his tenure, he led major infrastructure initiatives aimed at enhancing Malta’s connectivity and sustainability. Under his guidance, significant progress was made in the development of road networks, public transportation systems, and other critical infrastructure projects.

During his mandate, he oversaw the setup of the Infrastructure Malta agency, which led to the creation of important infrastructural projects such as the Kappara junction, the Marsa junction project, and the Central Link project. Dr. Borg also spearheaded several transformative initiatives, including the first major works of the Ta' Qali National Park and the Bengħajsa National Park, two of Malta's largest green spaces and public recreational areas.

In collaboration with local councils and Infrastructure Malta, he also initiated a nationwide project to rebuild hundreds of residential roads across all localities, significantly improving infrastructure and accessibility for communities throughout Malta. Additionally, he oversaw various projects carried out by the Public Works Department, contributing to the modernization and enhancement of the country’s public infrastructure.

One of Dr. Borg’s key achievements was launching Malta's first tangible plan for a Metro system, a groundbreaking project aimed at revolutionizing public transportation and addressing the long-term mobility needs of the nation.

=== Minister for Foreign and European Affairs and Trade ===
In March 2022, Borg was appointed Minister for Foreign and European Affairs and Trade. In this role, he has been actively engaged in advancing Malta’s foreign policy objectives, particularly in the areas of global peace, security, and economic development. Borg’s diplomatic efforts have been recognized at various levels, including his chairpersonship of the United Nations Security Council in February 2023 and April 2024. He is also serving as the 2024 Chair-in-Office of the Organization for Security and Cooperation in Europe (OSCE), where he has been instrumental in addressing pressing global challenges while helping this organization secure the required resources and leadership for its future sustainability.

In February 2024, Borg visited Ukraine as his first international visit as Chairman-in-Office in a show of solidarity amid ongoing conflict. During his visit, he emphasized the importance of education in the face of adversity, writing "L-edukazzjoni hija l-akbar ċavetta għall-paċi" (Education is the key to peace) on the walls of a bombed school in a symbolic act of support. This visit underscored Malta’s commitment to global peace and the protection of fundamental rights during wartime. Borg’s leadership continues to be recognized internationally, and in 2025, he will chair the Maltese Presidency of the Council of Europe, further contributing to Malta’s role in promoting democracy, human rights, and the rule of law across Europe.

=== Deputy Leader for Parliamentary Affairs ===
In September 2024, Dr. Ian Borg was elected Deputy Leader for Parliamentary Affairs of Partit Laburista (Labour Party). In this regard, he was thus appointed Deputy Prime Minister, in addition to his role as Minister for Foreign and European Affairs and Trade. This new position further strengthens his influence within the Maltese government, where he will play a critical role in coordinating legislative initiatives and overseeing parliamentary matters, solidifying his standing as a key figure in Malta's political landscape.

=== Minister for Tourism ===
After Clayton Bartolo tendered his resignation from the Labour Party on 26 November 2024, Ian Borg was assigned the Tourism portfolio in addition to his role as Deputy Prime Minister and Minister for Foreign and European Affairs and Trade.

=== Minister for Health ===
After Labour's 2026 general election victory, Ian Borg was appointed Minister for Health.

== Recognition and achievements ==
In 2016, he was named in Forbes’ "30 Under 30" list for policymakers, highlighting his influence and potential in the political sphere. In 2017, he was included in the European Voice’s "Top 40 Under 40,".

== Honour ==
- Sovereign Military Order of Malta: Knight Grand Cross of the Order of Merit

Political offices
Preceded by Evarist Bartolo	Minister of Foreign Affairs; 2022–present	Incumbent
