= Emmanuel Mallia =

Maltese politician

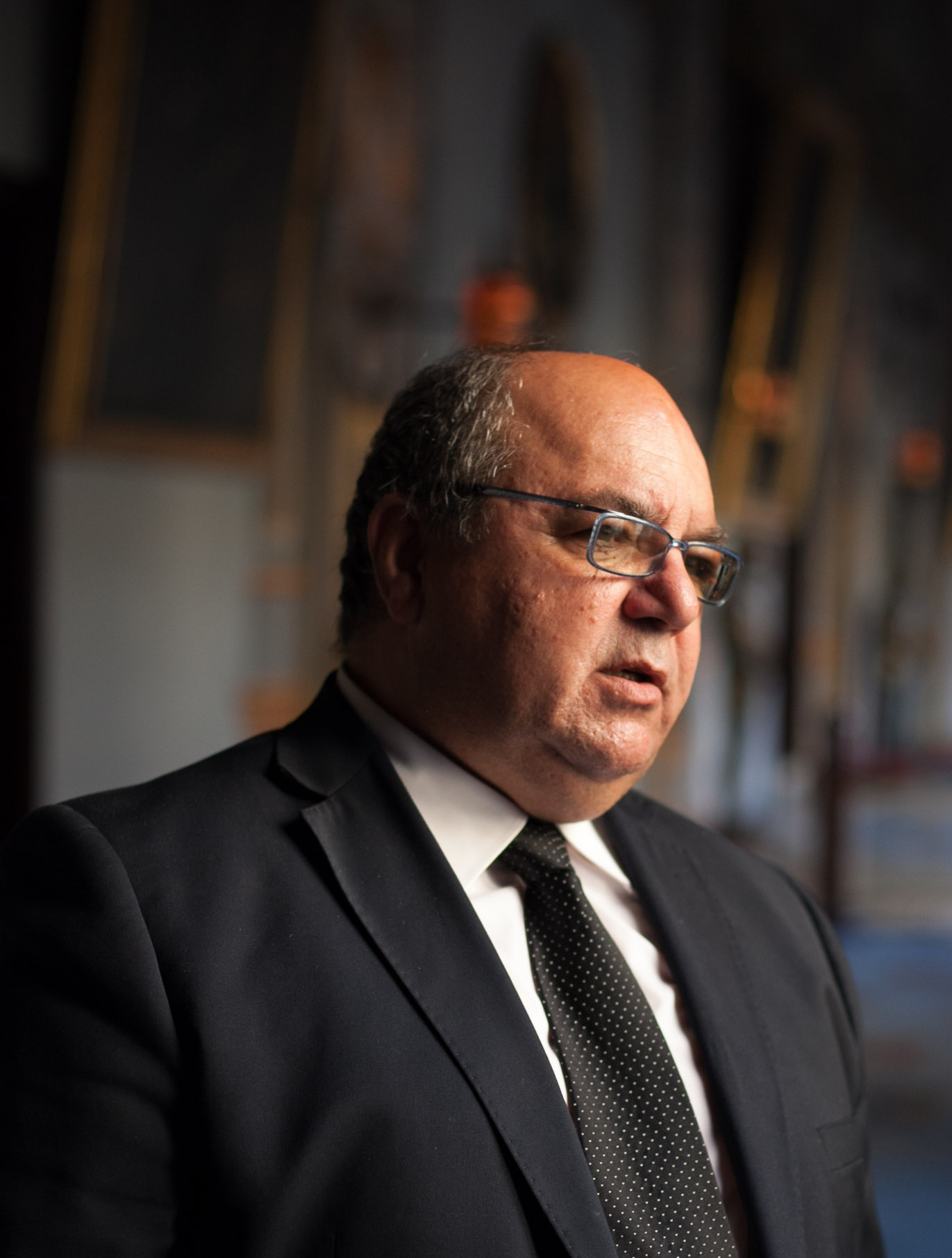

UK High Commissioner
- In office 12 November 2021 – present

Minister for Competitiveness and Digital, Maritime and Services Economy
- In office 28 April 2016 – 3 June 2017
- Prime Minister: Joseph Muscat

Minister for Home Affairs and National Security
- In office 13 March 2013 – 9 December 2014
- Prime Minister: Joseph Muscat
- Preceded by: Lawrence Gonzi
- Succeeded by: Carmelo Abela

Member of Parliament
- In office 2013–2021

Personal details
- Party: Labour Party (Malta)
- Spouse: Elena Codruta (Romanian)
- Children: 2
- Profession: Lawyer
- Website: http://www.mcdms.gov.mt/

Emmanuel Mallia is a Maltese politician. He was the Minister for Home Affairs and National Security of the Republic of Malta. Following an alleged "cover-up" within his ministry, he was removed from office by Prime Minister Joseph Muscat on 9 December 2014 and replaced by Carmelo Abela. In 2016, Mallia returned to the cabinet as Minister for Competitiveness and Digital, Maritime and Services Economy, a portfolio which he retained until the 2017 general election. Mallia remained an MP in the Maltese Parliament until 2021, when he resigned to become Malta's UK High Commissioner.

== Early life and education ==
Mallia was born in Sliema, Malta, the youngest child in a family of five. His father died when he was almost 16 years old. Mallia lived in Gżira, Malta for many years.

Mallia attended St Elizabeth School, Sliema, then the Sliema and Gżira primary schools. Following his secondary education at Naxxar Secondary/Technical School, he attended the Royal University of Malta where he graduated as a Legal Procurator in 1973, later at the University of Malta, graduating as a Notary Public in 1978 and Doctor of Laws in 1979.

== Legal career ==
Mallia lectured Criminal Law and Criminal Procedure at the University of Malta.

Mallia holds posts as legal advisor to a number of Companies and Employers' Associations. He has served as president of the Casino Maltese for eight years, and four years Vice President to the Malta Red Cross. He sat on committees set up under the auspices of the Council of Europe. Mallia was also a member of the executive committee and Council of the Malta Football Association and the Car Racing Association, and President of the Pembroke Basketball Club.

Mallia is the founder member and the senior managing partner of a law firm, situated at Msida, Malta called, Emmanuel Mallia & Associates established in 1980. He has formed part of defence teams in international criminal trials held in the United Kingdom, the Netherlands and Italy, foremost the Lockerbie Trial.

Mallia is a member of the Camera degli'Avvocati, the International Bar Association and the American Bar Association.

== Politics ==
Mallia contested Malta's general elections for the first time in March 2013 on the Labour Party ticket and was elected in the 9th district (Ħal Għargħur, L-Imsida, San Ġwann, Is-Swieqi, Ta' Xbiex) and district 10 (Il-Gżira, Pembroke, San Ġiljan, Tas-Sliema).

He announced his candidature at the Labour Party General Conference in January 2012.

== Personal life ==
Mallia lives with his wife Elena Codruta in London. The couple have two children.
