= Cabinet of Malta =

Collective decision-making body of the Government of Malta

The Cabinet of Malta is the collective decision-making body of the Government of Malta, composed of the Prime Minister and a number of ministers who are selected by the Prime Minister from the elected members of the House of Representatives to head government departments. Parliamentary Secretaries (equivalent to junior ministers) can also be invited to attend cabinet meetings as well as other senior government officials. It is presided over by the Prime Minister of Malta.

== See also ==
- List of Maltese governments
