= List of monuments in Qormi =

This is a list of monuments in Qormi, Malta, which are listed on the National Inventory of the Cultural Property of the Maltese Islands.

== List ==
Name of object	Location	Coordinates	ID	Photo	Upload
Niche of the Pieta (destroyed)	Tal-Istabal Hunting Lodge, Triq Ħal Qormi	35°52′48″N 14°29′04″E	00323	Niche of the Pieta (destroyed)	Upload Photo
Empty Niche (destroyed)	Tal-Istabal Hunting Lodge, Triq Ħal Qormi	35°52′48″N 14°29′04″E	00324	Empty Niche (destroyed)	Upload Photo
Statue of St Francis (destroyed)	Tal-Istabal Hunting Lodge, Triq Ħal Qormi	35°52′48″N 14°29′04″E	00325	Statue of St Francis (destroyed)	Upload Photo
Niche of the Immaculate Conception	Triq Valletta c/w Triq ta' l-Erba Qaddisin (Note: Statue missing)	35°52′49″N 14°28′56″E	00326	Niche of the Immaculate Conception	Upload Photo
Niche of St John of the Cross	Triq Ħal Qormi c/w Triq ta' l-Erba Qaddisin	35°52′47″N 14°28′56″E	00327	Niche of St John of the Cross	Upload Photo
Relief of the Madonna of Mount Carmel	203 Triq San Bastjan	35°52′46″N 14°28′46″E	00328	Relief of the Madonna of Mount Carmel	Upload Photo
Niche of St Roque	201 Triq San Bastjan	35°52′46″N 14°28′46″E	00329	Niche of St Roque	Upload Photo
Niche of St Joseph	165 Triq San Bastjan	35°52′45″N 14°28′42″E	00330	Niche of St Joseph	Upload Photo
Niche of the Assumption	125 Triq San Bastjan	35°52′44″N 14°28′39″E	00331	Niche of the Assumption	Upload Photo
Niche of the Madonna of the Rosay	108 Triq San Bastjan c/w Triq Correa	35°52′43″N 14°28′37″E	00332	Niche of the Madonna of the Rosay	Upload Photo
Niche of St Joseph	81 Triq San Bastjan	35°52′42″N 14°28′35″E	00333	Niche of St Joseph	Upload Photo
Niche of St Thomas	51 Triq San Bastjan	35°52′42″N 14°28′32″E	00334	Niche of St Thomas	Upload Photo
Niche of St Peter the Martyr	47 Triq San Bastjan c/w Triq Santa Marija	35°52′42″N 14°28′32″E	00335	Niche of St Peter the Martyr	Upload Photo
Statue of St Sebastian	Triq San Bastjan c/w Triq San Bartolomew	35°52′42″N 14°28′31″E	00336	Statue of St Sebastian	Upload Photo
Niche of St Sebastian	24 Triq San Bastjan	35°52′41″N 14°28′30″E	00337	Niche of St Sebastian	Upload Photo
Niche of the Madonna of Lourdes	27 Triq San Bastjan	35°52′42″N 14°28′30″E	00338	Niche of the Madonna of Lourdes	Upload Photo
Niche of the Madonna of Mount Carmel	9 Triq San Bastjan	35°52′41″N 14°28′28″E	00339	Niche of the Madonna of Mount Carmel	Upload Photo
Statue of St George	Triq San Bastjan c/w Triq San Rafel	35°52′41″N 14°28′28″E	00340	Statue of St George	Upload Photo
Niche with Christ carrying the cross	Triq San Bastjan c/w Triq il-Vitorja	35°52′40″N 14°28′28″E	00341	Niche with Christ carrying the cross	Upload Photo
Niche of St Joseph	469 Triq il-Vitorja	35°52′40″N 14°28′31″E	00342	Niche of St Joseph	Upload Photo
Niche of St Julian	503 Triq il-Vitorja	35°52′39″N 14°28′33″E	00343	Niche of St Julian	Upload Photo
Niche of the Immaculate Conception	Sqaq il-Vitoria Nru. 1	35°52′38″N 14°28′33″E	00344	Niche of the Immaculate Conception	Upload Photo
Relief of the Madonna of Good Counsel	99 Triq San Bartolomew	35°52′36″N 14°28′34″E	00345	Relief of the Madonna of Good Counsel	Upload Photo
Niche of St Anthony of Padua	480 Triq il-Vitoria	35°52′38″N 14°28′34″E	00346	Niche of St Anthony of Padua	Upload Photo
Niche of the Christ the King	Triq San Bartolomew c/w Triq San Benedittu	35°52′47″N 14°28′28″E	00347	Niche of the Christ the King	Upload Photo
Niche of St Lawrence	21 Triq San Bartolomew	35°52′45″N 14°28′29″E	00348	Niche of St Lawrence	Upload Photo
Niche of the Madonna of Mount Carmel	29 Triq San Bartolomew	35°52′44″N 14°28′30″E	00349	Niche of the Madonna of Mount Carmel	Upload Photo
Niche of St Paul	"Our Nest", 70 Triq San Benedittu	35°52′46″N 14°28′30″E	00350	Niche of St Paul	Upload Photo
Niche of St Lawrence	"Salvjacq", 82 Triq San Benedittu	35°52′47″N 14°28′32″E	00351	Niche of St Lawrence	Upload Photo
Niche of the Assumption	55 Triq Santa Marija	35°52′46″N 14°28′31″E	00352	Niche of the Assumption	Upload Photo
Niche of St Anthony of Padua	"Casa Briffa", 264 Triq il-Kbira	35°52′47″N 14°28′33″E	00353	Niche of St Anthony of Padua	Upload Photo
Statue of St Paul	Triq il-Kbira c/w Triq San Ġużepp	35°52′47″N 14°28′33″E	00354	Statue of St Paul	Upload Photo
Niche of the Immaculate Conception	"May Pole", 26/28 Triq San Ġużepp	35°52′44″N 14°28′33″E	00355	Niche of the Immaculate Conception	Upload Photo
Niche of St Roque	38 Triq Santu Rokku	35°52′44″N 14°28′35″E	00356	Niche of St Roque	Upload Photo
Niche of the Madonna of the Rosary	42 Triq Correa c/w Triq il-Kunċizzjoni	35°52′45″N 14°28′37″E	00357	Niche of the Madonna of the Rosary	Upload Photo
Niche of St Joseph	45 Triq il-Kunċizzjoni	35°52′45″N 14°28′38″E	00358	Niche of St Joseph	Upload Photo
Relief of the Madonna of All Souls	"Alma Mater", 175 Triq il-Kbira c/w Triq Ġorġ Borġ	35°52′46″N 14°28′41″E	00359	Relief of the Madonna of All Souls	Upload Photo
Relief of St Sebastian and St George	182 Triq il-Kbira	35°52′46″N 14°28′42″E	00360	Relief of St Sebastian and St George	Upload Photo
Niche of the Immaculate Conception	Triq il-Kbira c/w Triq San Bartolomew	35°52′48″N 14°28′27″E	00361	Niche of the Immaculate Conception	Upload Photo
Niche of the Pieta	179 Triq San Bartolomew	35°52′48″N 14°28′27″E	00362	Niche of the Pieta	Upload Photo
Niche of St George	"St. George", 301 Triq il-Kbira	35°52′48″N 14°28′27″E	00363	Niche of St George	Upload Photo
Niche of St Joseph	Triq San Bartolomew c/w Triq il-Kbira	35°52′48″N 14°28′27″E	00364	Niche of St Joseph	Upload Photo
Niche of St Francis	Triq il-Kbira c/w Triq Aniċi	35°52′49″N 14°28′25″E	00365	Niche of St Francis	Upload Photo
Niche of the Immaculate Conception	99/100 Triq il-Kbira	35°52′49″N 14°28′25″E	00366	Niche of the Immaculate Conception	Upload Photo
Niche of the Immaculate Conception	Triq San Pietru c/w Triq il-Kbira	35°52′49″N 14°28′23″E	00367	Niche of the Immaculate Conception	Upload Photo
Niche of the Sacred Heart of Jesus	84 Triq il-Kbira	35°52′50″N 14°28′22″E	00368	Niche of the Sacred Heart of Jesus	Upload Photo
Niche of St Paul	10 Triq San Pietru c/w 82 Triq il-Kbira	35°52′51″N 14°28′22″E	00369	Niche of St Paul	Upload Photo
Niche of the Madonna Mediatrix of all Graces	332 Triq il-Kbira c/w 11 Triq San Pietru	35°52′50″N 14°28′22″E	00370	Niche of the Madonna Mediatrix of all Graces	Upload Photo
Relief of the Madonna of Mount Carmel	75 Triq il-Kbira	35°52′52″N 14°28′20″E	00371	Relief of the Madonna of Mount Carmel	Upload Photo
Niche of St Roque	343 Triq il-Kbira	35°52′51″N 14°28′20″E	00372	Niche of St Roque	Upload Photo
Niche of the Madonna of Mount Carmel	344 Triq il-Kbira	35°52′51″N 14°28′20″E	00373	Niche of the Madonna of Mount Carmel	Upload Photo
Niche of the Immaculate Conception	348 Triq il-Kbira	35°52′52″N 14°28′18″E	00374	Niche of the Immaculate Conception	Upload Photo
Chapel of St Francis de Paul	Triq il-Kbira	35°52′53″N 14°28′18″E	00375	Chapel of St Francis de Paul	Upload Photo
Chapel of the Annunciation	Triq il-Kbira	35°52′53″N 14°28′18″E	00376	Chapel of the Annunciation	Upload Photo
Niche of St Raphael	62 Triq il-Kbira	35°52′53″N 14°28′18″E	00377	Niche of St Raphael	Upload Photo
Niche of the Immaculate Conception	359 c/w 360 Triq il-Kbira	35°52′53″N 14°28′17″E	00378	Niche of the Immaculate Conception	Upload Photo
Statue of St Louis Gonzaga	Sqaq il-Kbira Nru. 2 c/w 51 Triq il-Kbira	35°52′54″N 14°28′16″E	00379	Statue of St Louis Gonzaga	Upload Photo
Niche of the Immaculate Conception	370 Triq il-Kbira	35°52′54″N 14°28′16″E	00380	Niche of the Immaculate Conception	Upload Photo
Niche of St Joseph	378 Triq il-Kbira c/w 90 Pjazza San Franġisk	35°52′54″N 14°28′14″E	00381	Niche of St Joseph	Upload Photo
Niche of St Roque	386 Triq il-Kbira	35°52′54″N 14°28′13″E	00382	Niche of St Roque	Upload Photo
Niche of the Immaculate Conception	389 Triq il-Kbira	35°52′55″N 14°28′12″E	00383	Niche of the Immaculate Conception	Upload Photo
Parish Church of St George	Triq il-Kbira c/w Triq San Ġorġ	35°52′56″N 14°28′06″E	00384	Parish Church of St George	Upload Photo
Statue of St Publius	1 Triq il-Kbira (church zuntier)	35°52′56″N 14°28′08″E	00385	Statue of St Publius	Upload Photo
Statue of St Paul	409 Triq il-Kbira (church zuntier)	35°52′55″N 14°28′08″E	00386	Statue of St Paul	Upload Photo
Niche of the Pieta	85 Triq il-Kardinal Xiberras c/w Triq San Ġorġ	35°52′55″N 14°28′07″E	00387	Niche of the Pieta	Upload Photo
Niche of the Sacred Heart of Jesus	65 Triq il-Kardinal Xiberras c/w Triq il-Qalb Imqaddsa	35°52′53″N 14°28′06″E	00388	Niche of the Sacred Heart of Jesus	Upload Photo
Niche of the Madonna of Mount Carmel	67 Triq il-Kardinal Xiberras c/w Triq il-Qalb Imqaddsa	35°52′53″N 14°28′07″E	00389	Niche of the Madonna of Mount Carmel	Upload Photo
Niche of the Madonna of the Rosary	89 Triq il-Barrakki	35°52′52″N 14°28′05″E	00390	Niche of the Madonna of the Rosary	Upload Photo
Niche of St George	100/102 Triq il-Barrakki	35°52′53″N 14°28′04″E	00391	Niche of St George	Upload Photo
Niche of St John the Baptist	"Ritrose", 68 Triq Dun Marju c/w Sqaq Stagno	35°52′54″N 14°28′01″E	00392	Niche of St John the Baptist	Upload Photo
Niche of the Immaculate Conception	66 Triq Dun Marju	35°52′54″N 14°28′01″E	00393	Niche of the Immaculate Conception	Upload Photo
Niche of St Joseph	58 Triq Dun Marju	35°52′55″N 14°28′02″E	00394	Niche of St Joseph	Upload Photo
Niche of St George	42/44 Triq Dun Marju	35°52′56″N 14°28′02″E	00395	Niche of St George	Upload Photo
Niche of St George	29 Triq Dun Marju	35°52′56″N 14°28′02″E	00396	Niche of St George	Upload Photo
Niche of St George	26 Triq Dun Marju c/w Triq San Ġorġ	35°52′57″N 14°28′03″E	00397	Niche of St George	Upload Photo
Niche of the Immaculate Conception	9 Triq Dun Marju (Note: Niche of the Immaculate Conception with a figure of St George placed there between 2012 and 2022)	35°52′58″N 14°28′04″E	00398	Niche of the Immaculate Conception	Upload Photo
Niche of St Joseph	24 Triq Aloisio	35°52′59″N 14°28′04″E	00399	Niche of St Joseph	Upload Photo
Niche of St Francis	26/28 Triq Aloisio	35°52′59″N 14°28′03″E	00400	Niche of St Francis	Upload Photo
Niche of St Anthony of Padua	3 Trejqa Ta' San Ġorġ	35°52′58″N 14°28′03″E	00401	Niche of St Anthony of Padua	Upload Photo
Niche of the Pieta	6/8 Triq il-Wied	35°52′59″N 14°28′08″E	00402	Niche of the Pieta	Upload Photo
Niche of the Immaculate Conception	Sqaq il-Wied Nru. 5	35°53′00″N 14°28′08″E	00403	Niche of the Immaculate Conception	Upload Photo
Niche of the Madonna of Mount Carmel	31 Triq il-Blata	35°53′00″N 14°28′07″E	00404	Niche of the Madonna of Mount Carmel	Upload Photo
Statue of the Madonna	Triq il-Blata	35°53′02″N 14°28′06″E	00405		Upload Photo
Chapel of Santa Marija Fuq tal-Blat	Triq il-Blata	35°53′02″N 14°28′06″E	00406		Upload Photo
Niche of Christ the King	1 Triq il-Blata	35°53′02″N 14°28′06″E	00407	Niche of Christ the King	Upload Photo
Niche of St George	Sqaq il-Blata Nru. 1	35°53′02″N 14°28′05″E	00408	Niche of St George	Upload Photo
Niche of St Joseph	Misraħ Santa Marija / 2 Triq il-Valletta	35°53′03″N 14°28′05″E	00409	Niche of St Joseph	Upload Photo
Niche of St George	7 Triq il-Kanun	35°52′59″N 14°28′39″E	00410	Niche of St George	Upload Photo
Niche of the Risen Christ	Triq Pawlu Farrugia c/w Triq Correa	35°52′53″N 14°28′39″E	00411	Niche of the Risen Christ	Upload Photo
Niche of St Joseph	"1743 Razzett l-Antik", Triq il-Wied	35°52′55″N 14°28′26″E	00412	Niche of St Joseph	Upload Photo
Niche of St Paul	Triq il-Wied c/w Triq San Pawl	35°52′55″N 14°28′23″E	00413	Niche of St Paul	Upload Photo
Niche of St George	Triq il-Wied c/w Triq il-Mitħna	35°52′55″N 14°28′22″E	00414	Niche of St George	Upload Photo
Niche of St Joseph	Triq San Pawl c/w 29 Triq San Franġisk	35°52′54″N 14°28′23″E	00415	Niche of St Joseph	Upload Photo
Niche of the Immaculate Conception	16 Triq il-Wied c/w Sqaq il-Wied Nru. 10	35°52′58″N 14°28′13″E	00416		Upload Photo
Niche of the Madonna of the Rosary	Triq il-Wied c/w Sqaq il-Wied Nru. 7	35°52′59″N 14°28′10″E	00417	Niche of the Madonna of the Rosary	Upload Photo
Niche of St Michael	Sqaq il-Wied Nru. 7	35°52′59″N 14°28′11″E	00418	Niche of St Michael	Upload Photo
Niche of the Sacred Heart of Jesus	"St. Mary", 55 Triq il-Blata c/w Trejqet tal-Blata	35°52′57″N 14°28′08″E	00419	Niche of the Sacred Heart of Jesus	Upload Photo
Niche of St Michael	"St. Michael", 70 Triq il-Blata	35°53′00″N 14°28′11″E	00420	Niche of St Michael	Upload Photo
Relief of the Madonna of Ta' Pinu	49 Triq il-Blata c/w Trejqet tal-Blata	35°52′58″N 14°28′08″E	00421	Relief of the Madonna of Ta' Pinu	Upload Photo
Niche of the Immaculate Conception	"Il-Kantilena", 75 Pjazza San Franġisk	35°52′53″N 14°28′14″E	00422	Niche of the Immaculate Conception	Upload Photo
Statue of the Madonna of Lourdes	Pjazza San Franġisk	35°52′52″N 14°28′15″E	00423	Statue of the Madonna of Lourdes	Upload Photo
Relief of the Assumption	114 Pjazza San Franġisk	35°52′52″N 14°28′16″E	00424	Relief of the Assumption	Upload Photo
Niche of the Madonna of Lourdes	"Tal-Lucent", 21 Pjazza San Franġisk	35°52′51″N 14°28′17″E	00425	Niche of the Madonna of Lourdes	Upload Photo
Chapel of Santa Marija tal-Qrejqca	Triq Santa Katerina	35°52′51″N 14°28′14″E	00426	Chapel of Santa Marija tal-Qrejqca	Upload Photo
Niche of the Pieta	2 Triq Stanislaw Gatt c/w 1 Triq Santa Katerina	35°52′51″N 14°28′14″E	00427	Niche of the Pieta	Upload Photo
Niche of St Joseph	"Santa Rita", 4 Triq Santa Katerina	35°52′51″N 14°28′14″E	00428	Niche of St Joseph	Upload Photo
Niche of St George	22 Triq Santa Katerina	35°52′50″N 14°28′15″E	00429	Niche of St George	Upload Photo
Chapel of St Peter the Martyr	Triq San Pietru c/w Triq Santa Katerina	35°52′49″N 14°28′16″E	00430	Chapel of St Peter the Martyr	Upload Photo
Niche of St Joseph	60 Triq San Pietru	35°52′49″N 14°28′17″E	00431	Niche of St Joseph	Upload Photo
Niche of the Immaculate Conception	52 Triq San Pietru c/w Sqaq San Pietru Nru. 1	35°52′49″N 14°28′18″E	00432	Niche of the Immaculate Conception	Upload Photo
Statue of the Madonna of the Rosary	Triq San Pietru	35°52′48″N 14°28′21″E	00433	Statue of the Madonna of the Rosary	Upload Photo
Niche of St Paul	3 Sqaq San Pietru Nru. 4	35°52′48″N 14°28′22″E	00434	Niche of St Paul	Upload Photo
Niche of St Joseph	"S. Joseph", 7 Sqaq San Pietru Nru. 4	35°52′47″N 14°28′23″E	00435	Niche of St Joseph	Upload Photo
Niche of the Madonna of Mount Carmel	7 Sqaq San Pietru Nru. 5	35°52′48″N 14°28′20″E	00436	Niche of the Madonna of Mount Carmel	Upload Photo
Niche of the Immaculate Conception	14 Triq San Pietru	35°52′49″N 14°28′21″E	00437	Niche of the Immaculate Conception	Upload Photo
Niche of St Roque	8 Sqaq San Pietru Nru. 2	35°52′50″N 14°28′21″E	00438	Niche of St Roque	Upload Photo
Statue of St George	187 Triq il-Vitorja	35°52′40″N 14°28′04″E	00439		Upload Photo
Niche of the Madonna of Mount Carmel	12 Triq L-Isqof Scicluna	35°52′46″N 14°28′14″E	00440	Niche of the Madonna of Mount Carmel	Upload Photo
Niche of St Anthony of Padua	"Samlin", 2 Triq L-Isqof Scicluna c/w 88 Triq Santa Katerina	35°52′46″N 14°28′16″E	00441	Niche of St Anthony of Padua	Upload Photo
Niche of St Michael	49 Triq Santa Katerina c/w Sqaq Santa Katerina Nru. 3	35°52′47″N 14°28′16″E	00442	Niche of St Michael	Upload Photo
Niche of the Madonna of Mount Carmel	51 Triq Santa Katerina	35°52′46″N 14°28′17″E	00443	Niche of the Madonna of Mount Carmel	Upload Photo
Chapel of St Catherine	Triq Santa Katerina	35°52′48″N 14°28′15″E	00444	Chapel of St Catherine	Upload Photo
Relief of the Madonna of All Souls	70 Triq Santa Katerina	35°52′47″N 14°28′15″E	00445	Relief of the Madonna of All Souls	Upload Photo
Niche of the Madonna	39/41 Triq Santa Katerina	35°52′47″N 14°28′15″E	00446	Niche of the Madonna	Upload Photo
Niche of St Joseph	64/66 Triq Santa Katerina	35°52′47″N 14°28′14″E	00447	Niche of St Joseph	Upload Photo
Niche of St Joseph	"Cypraea", 1 Sqaq Santa Katerina Nru. 1	35°52′48″N 14°28′14″E	00448	Niche of St Joseph	Upload Photo
Niche of the Madonna of Mount Carmel	31 Triq Santa Katerina	35°52′48″N 14°28′16″E	00449	Niche of the Madonna of Mount Carmel	Upload Photo
Niche of St George (formerly of the Immaculate Conception)	2/4 Sqaq Santa Katerina Nru. 2	35°52′48″N 14°28′14″E	00450	Niche of St George (formerly of the Immaculate Conception)	Upload Photo
Niche of the Madonna of Mount Carmel	104/106 Triq Santa Katerina	35°52′44″N 14°28′16″E	00451	Niche of the Madonna of Mount Carmel	Upload Photo
Relief of the Madonna of Mount Carmel	"Ave Maria", 67 Triq Santa Katerina	35°52′44″N 14°28′17″E	00452	Relief of the Madonna of Mount Carmel	Upload Photo
Niche of St Anthony of Padua	Sqaq Santa Katerina Nru. 5	35°52′44″N 14°28′17″E	00453	Niche of St Anthony of Padua	Upload Photo
Niche of St George	13 Sqaq Pinto Nru. 1	35°52′44″N 14°28′15″E	00454	Niche of St George	Upload Photo
Niche of the Immaculate Conception	3 Sqaq Pinto Nru. 1	35°52′44″N 14°28′14″E	00455	Niche of the Immaculate Conception	Upload Photo
Relief of the Pieta	Sqaq Pinto Nru. 2	35°52′44″N 14°28′15″E	00456	Relief of the Pieta	Upload Photo
Church of the Birth of the Madonna	262 Triq il-Vitorja	35°52′42″N 14°28′15″E	00457	Church of the Birth of the Madonna	Upload Photo
Statue of St Joseph	Triq il-Vitorja c/w Triq Pinto	35°52′43″N 14°28′14″E	00458		Upload Photo
Niche of St Joseph	254 Triq il-Vitorja	35°52′42″N 14°28′14″E	00459	Niche of St Joseph	Upload Photo
Niche of St George	252 Triq il-Vitorja	35°52′42″N 14°28′14″E	00460	Niche of St George	Upload Photo
Niche of St Joseph	226/228 Triq il-Vitorja	35°52′42″N 14°28′13″E	00461	Niche of St Joseph	Upload Photo
Niche of St Joseph	"Dar San Ġużepp", 141 Triq Pinto	35°52′43″N 14°28′12″E	00462	Niche of St Joseph	Upload Photo
Niche of the Assumption	130 Triq Pinto	35°52′43″N 14°28′10″E	00463	Niche of the Assumption	Upload Photo
Niche of the Madonna of the Rosary	10 Triq L-Iskola	35°52′44″N 14°28′08″E	00464	Niche of the Madonna of the Rosary	Upload Photo
Niche of the Immaculate Conception	105 Triq Pinto	35°52′44″N 14°28′08″E	00465	Niche of the Immaculate Conception	Upload Photo
Niche of the Immaculate Conception	92 Triq Pinto	35°52′44″N 14°28′06″E	00466	Niche of the Immaculate Conception	Upload Photo
Niche of St Anthony of Padua	Sqaq it-23 ta' April	35°52′45″N 14°28′13″E	00467	Niche of St Anthony of Padua	Upload Photo
Niche of the Immaculate Conception	Sqaq il-Vitorja Nru. 6	35°52′43″N 14°28′18″E	00468	Niche of the Immaculate Conception	Upload Photo
Niche of the Immaculate Conception	329 Triq il-Vitorja	35°52′42″N 14°28′18″E	00469	Niche of the Immaculate Conception	Upload Photo
Niche of the Madonna of the Rosary	Sqaq il-Vitorja Nru. 5	35°52′41″N 14°28′18″E	00470	Niche of the Madonna of the Rosary	Upload Photo
Niche of the Immaculate Conception	373 Triq il-Vitorja	35°52′41″N 14°28′22″E	00471	Niche of the Immaculate Conception	Upload Photo
Niche of St Joseph	366 Triq il-Vitorja	35°52′40″N 14°28′24″E	00472	Niche of St Joseph	Upload Photo
Niche of St Andrew	72 Triq San Rafel	35°52′41″N 14°28′26″E	00473	Niche of St Andrew	Upload Photo
Niche of St Joachim	67 Triq San Rafel	35°52′42″N 14°28′26″E	00474	Niche of St Joachim	Upload Photo
Niche of Christ the King	81 Triq il-Mitħna (Note: The house which included this niche was demolished in 2017.)	35°53′01″N 14°28′24″E	00475	Niche of Christ the King	Upload Photo
Niche of St Nicholas	6 Triq il-Mitħna	35°52′56″N 14°28′23″E	00476	Niche of St Nicholas	Upload Photo
Niche of the Madonna	21 Sqaq San Rafel Nru. 2	35°52′44″N 14°28′21″E	00477	Niche of the Madonna	Upload Photo
Niche of St George	15 Triq San Rafel	35°52′43″N 14°28′22″E	00478	Niche of St George	Upload Photo
Niche of the Immaculate Conception	22 Triq San Rafel	35°52′43″N 14°28′22″E	00479	Niche of the Immaculate Conception	Upload Photo
Niche of St Joseph	29 Triq San Rafel	35°52′42″N 14°28′23″E	00480	Niche of St Joseph	Upload Photo
Niche of the Madonna of Mount Carmel	54 Triq San Rafel	35°52′42″N 14°28′24″E	00481	Niche of the Madonna of Mount Carmel	Upload Photo
Niche of the Pieta	68 Triq San Rafel	35°52′41″N 14°28′26″E	00482	Niche of the Pieta	Upload Photo
Sculpture of the Holy Family	24 Pjazza Federico Maempel	35°52′49″N 14°28′04″E	00483	Sculpture of the Holy Family	Upload Photo
Niche of St Joseph	2 Triq San Pietru	35°52′52″N 14°28′22″E	00484	Niche of St Joseph	Upload Photo
Niche of the Madonna Mediatrix of all Graces	13 Triq San Pawl c/w Triq il-Habbież	35°52′53″N 14°28′23″E	00485	Niche of the Madonna Mediatrix of all Graces	Upload Photo
Chapel of Santa Marija tal-Ħlas	Triq il-Ħlas	35°52′42″N 14°27′19″E	00486	Chapel of Santa Marija tal-Ħlas	Upload Photo
Statue of the Madonna	Triq il-Ħlas	35°52′42″N 14°27′19″E	00487		Upload Photo
Statue of St Peter	Triq San Bartolomew	35°52′38″N 14°28′36″E	00488	Statue of St Peter	Upload Photo
Statue of St Paul	Triq San Bartolomew	35°52′38″N 14°28′35″E	00489	Statue of St Paul	Upload Photo
Niche of St George	150 Triq San Bastjan	35°52′44″N 14°28′41″E	00490	Niche of St George	Upload Photo
Relief of the Madonna of Good Counsel	152 Triq il-Kbira c/w 66 Triq Correa	35°52′47″N 14°28′37″E	00491	Relief of the Madonna of Good Counsel	Upload Photo
Niche of St George	149 Triq il-Kbira	35°52′47″N 14°28′36″E	00492	Niche of St George	Upload Photo
Niche of St Sebastian	124 Triq San Bartolomew	35°52′40″N 14°28′34″E	00493	Niche of St Sebastian	Upload Photo
Niche of the Madonna of Mount Carmel	Triq San Bartolomew c/w Triq Patri G. Spiteri Fremond	35°52′40″N 14°28′35″E	00494	Niche of the Madonna of Mount Carmel	Upload Photo
Relief of the Madonna of Mount Carmel	Triq Ħal Luqa	35°52′21″N 14°28′38″E	00495	Relief of the Madonna of Mount Carmel	Upload Photo
Niche of St Joachim	Triq San Gwakkin	35°53′16″N 14°27′53″E	00496		Upload Photo
St Sebastian Chapel	Triq San Bastjan c/w Triq San Bartolomew	35°52′42″N 14°28′33″E	00497	St Sebastian Chapel	Upload Photo
St Sebastian Parish Church	Triq San Barlolomew	35°52′38″N 14°28′37″E	00498	St Sebastian Parish Church	Upload Photo
Palazzo Stagno	Sqaq Stagno	35°52′55″N 14°28′00″E	01208	Palazzo Stagno	Upload Photo
