= Royal Naval School Tal-Handaq =

Coordinates: 35°52′11″N 14°28′18″E

Tal-Handaq School Hall

The Royal Naval School Tal Handaq was a school for children of personnel of the British Armed Forces posted to Malta between January 1947 and July 1978. Formerly known as the Naval Children's School and HM Dockyard Children's School, it had occupied sites at Ta'Xbiex, Cottonera, Senglea and the Dockyard before moving to Tal Handaq, a military camp, built during World War 2, to resemble a Maltese village when viewed from the air. Staffed partially by Royal Naval personnel the school was also used by children of personnel of the Military of the United States in the 1950s. When first occupied as a school in 1947 only the buildings in the southern and central area of the present day school had been built. The remaining buildings were constructed in the early to late 1950s, initially with the objective of supporting a complement of some 800 British Forces pupils. The school was co-educational with similar numbers of boys and girls. It was also both a secondary grammar and a secondary modern school until 1963, when it re-formed as a comprehensive. Numbers at the school steadily increased until by 1960 the school held over 1000 pupils. Even so, class size was still not excessive with a typical class size of 25 pupils in 1960.

The Royal Naval School was renamed the Service Children's Comprehensive School in 1969. It closed as a Forces' school in 1978 just before the final withdrawal of British forces from Malta in March 1979.

The school re-opened as a Junior Lyceum in September 1981 under the name of Liceo M. A. Vassalli. In 2006 new building began on completion of which most of the old buildings were demolished. The new buildings opened in 2008 as Kullegg Sant' Injazju.

Commander Law 2007

== Headmasters ==
- Headmaster J Sullivan Nov 1858 –
- Headmaster W Candey 1918
- Headmaster Govier Mar 1925
- Headmaster H E Hindmand MBE Mar 1925 – Jun 1928
- Headmaster G H Rickers Jun 1928 – Dec 1932
- Headmaster Lieut W F Plant Nov 1932 – Dec 1937
- Headmaster Lieut F J Giles Dec 1937 – Sep 1942
- Instructor Commander A H Miles OBE (later Instructor Captain, CBE) May 1946 – Jan 1951
- Instructor Commander A J Bellamy OBE (later Instructor Rear Admiral, CB) Jan 1951 – Apr 1954
- Instructor Captain B J Morgan (later Instructor Rear Admiral, CB) Apr 1954 – Apr 1959
- Instructor Captain D E Mannering Apr 1959 – Aug 1963
- Instructor Captain L Broad Aug 1963 – Aug 1966
- Instructor Captain H C Malkin (later CBE) Aug 1966 – Jan 1970
- Instructor Commander M F Law (later Captain) Jan 1970 – Apr 1974
- Commander G D Stubbs Apr 1974 – Jul 1978

== Alternative spellings ==
The following spellings of Tal-Handaq may be found on present day official documents.

- Tal-Ħandaq (link to related Wikipedia entry)
- Tal-Handaq
- Tal Handaq

The following Anglicised spelling may occasionally be found on internal documents issued during the Royal Naval School period (refer: Etymology section).

- Tal-Handak
- Tal Handak

== Etymology ==
Tal Handak is the British phonetic spelling of the Maltese industrial area Tal Handaq located in the district of Qormi.

British people tend to pronounce Handaq as "Hand-Ack", unaware that the Maltese Q should be silent.

Some printed documents relating to the school incorrectly replace the Q with a K as "Tal Handak".

== Photo gallery ==
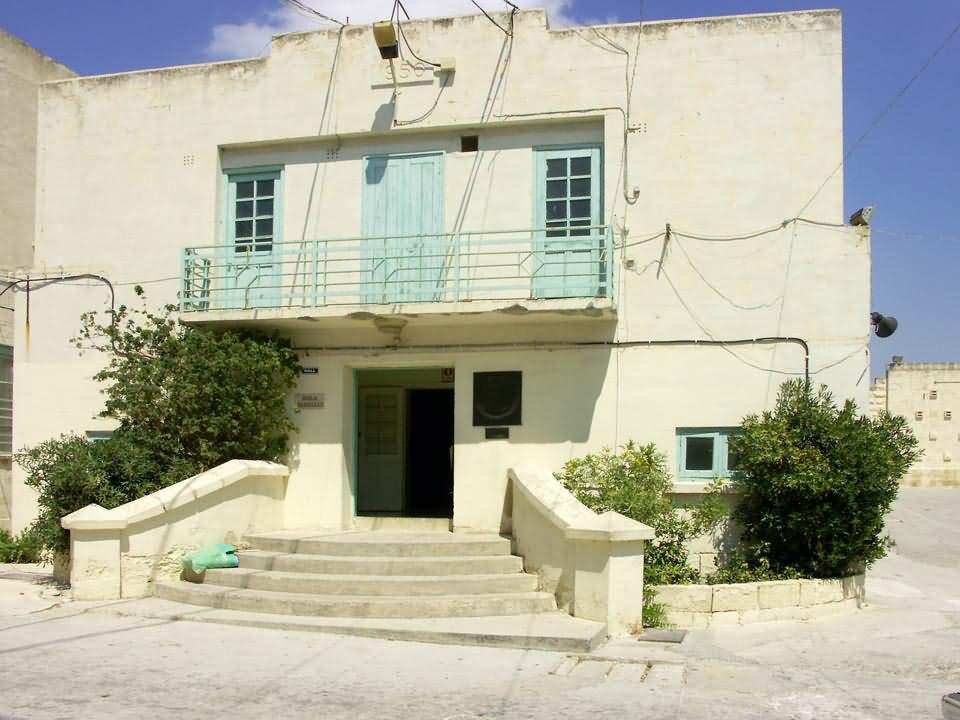
Entrance to the School Hall taken in 2004

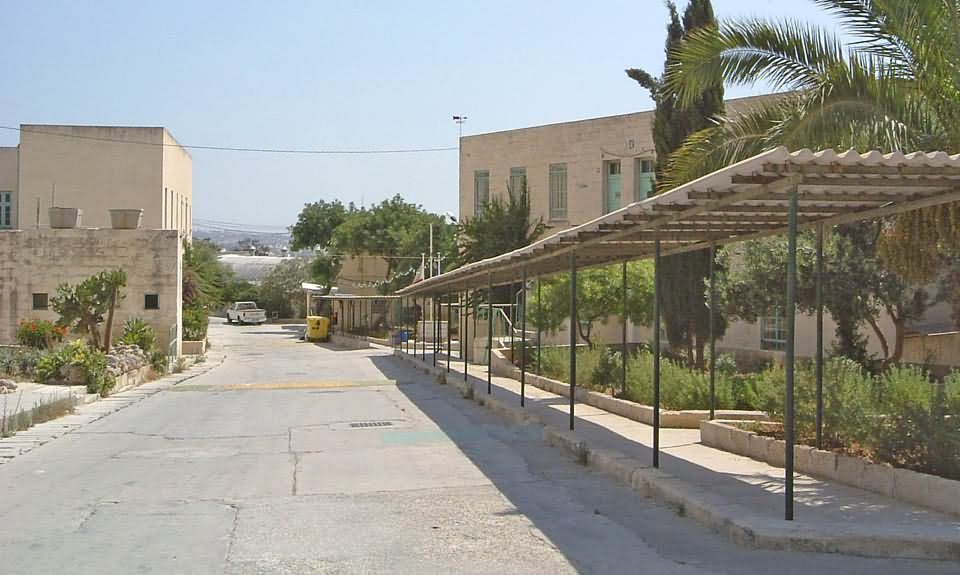
View looking down hill towards school hall and admin block

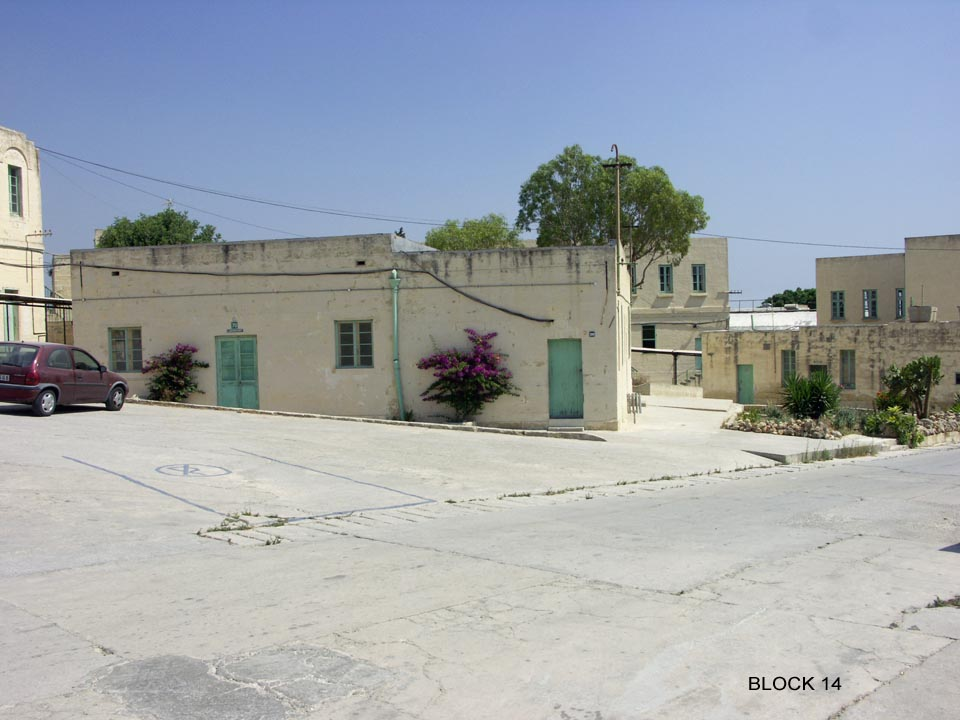
Tal-Handaq classroom

Secondary school under construction 2007

The Staffroom 1960s.

Science Labs 2007.

School production, Iolanthe, 1962.

The School 1957
