= Old Church of St Sebastian, Qormi =

Old Church of St Sebastian
- Il-Knisja l-Qadima ta' San Bastjan
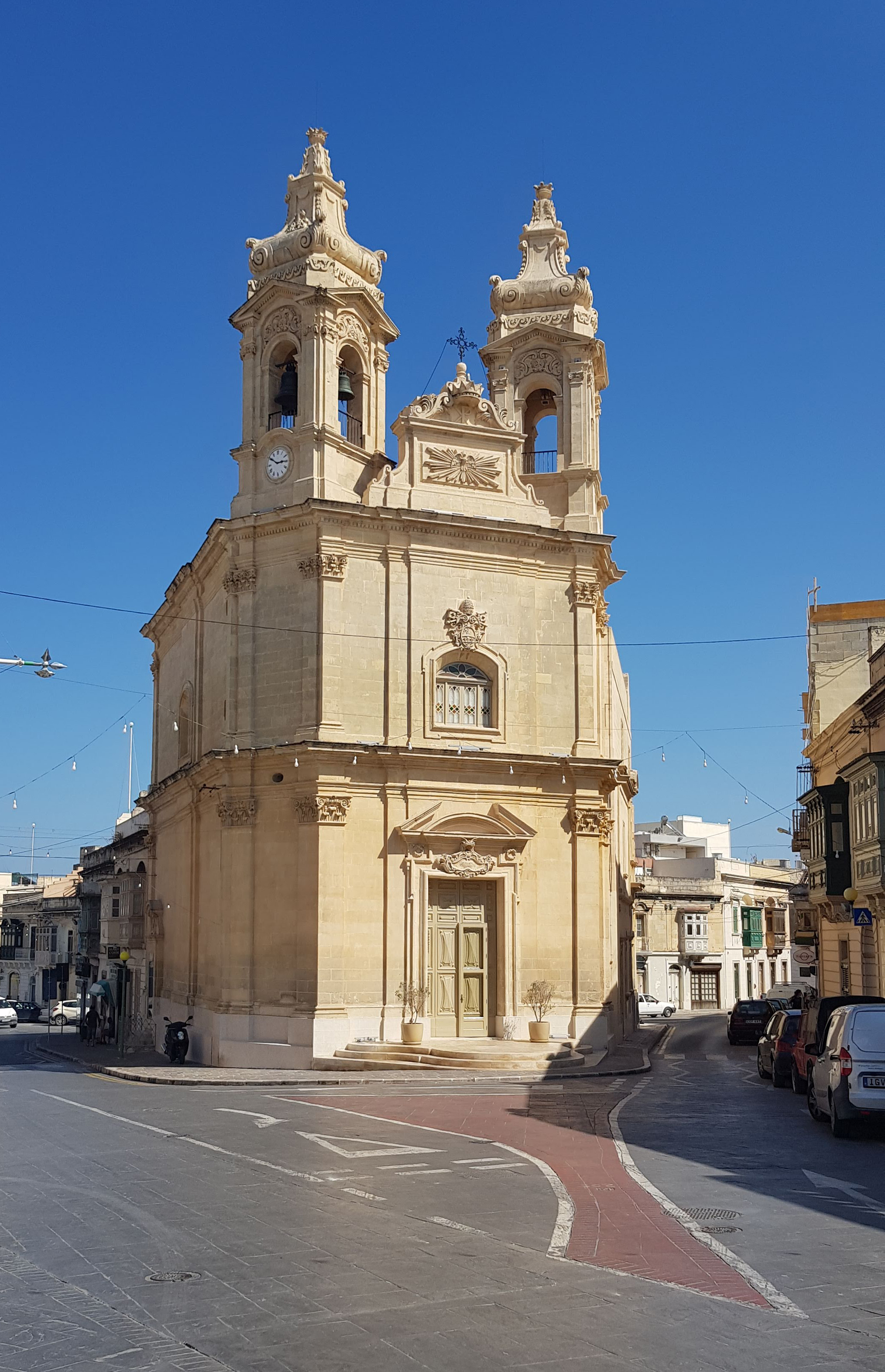
- The church in 2019
- Old Church of St Sebastian
- 35°52′41.5″N 14°28′33″E
- Location: Qormi, Malta
- Denomination: Roman Catholic

History
- Status: Church
- Dedication: Saint Sebastian
- Consecrated: 25 October 2019

Architecture
- Functional status: Active
- Years built: 1880–1890

Specifications
- Materials: Limestone

Administration
- Archdiocese: Malta
- Parish: Qormi (St George) (until 1935); Qormi (St Sebastian) (since 1935)

The Old Church of St Sebastian (Maltese: Il-Knisja l-Qadima ta' San Bastjan), commonly known as il-knisja ż-żgħira (Maltese for "the small church"), is a Roman Catholic church in Qormi, Malta, dedicated to Saint Sebastian. It was built between 1880 and 1890 near a statue of the saint which had been erected in 1815 to commemorate deliverance from a plague epidemic in 1813. It was a parish church between 1935 and the 1980s, when a larger parish church with the same dedication was built nearby. The building was only formally consecrated in 2019, and it is now used as an adoration chapel.

== History ==
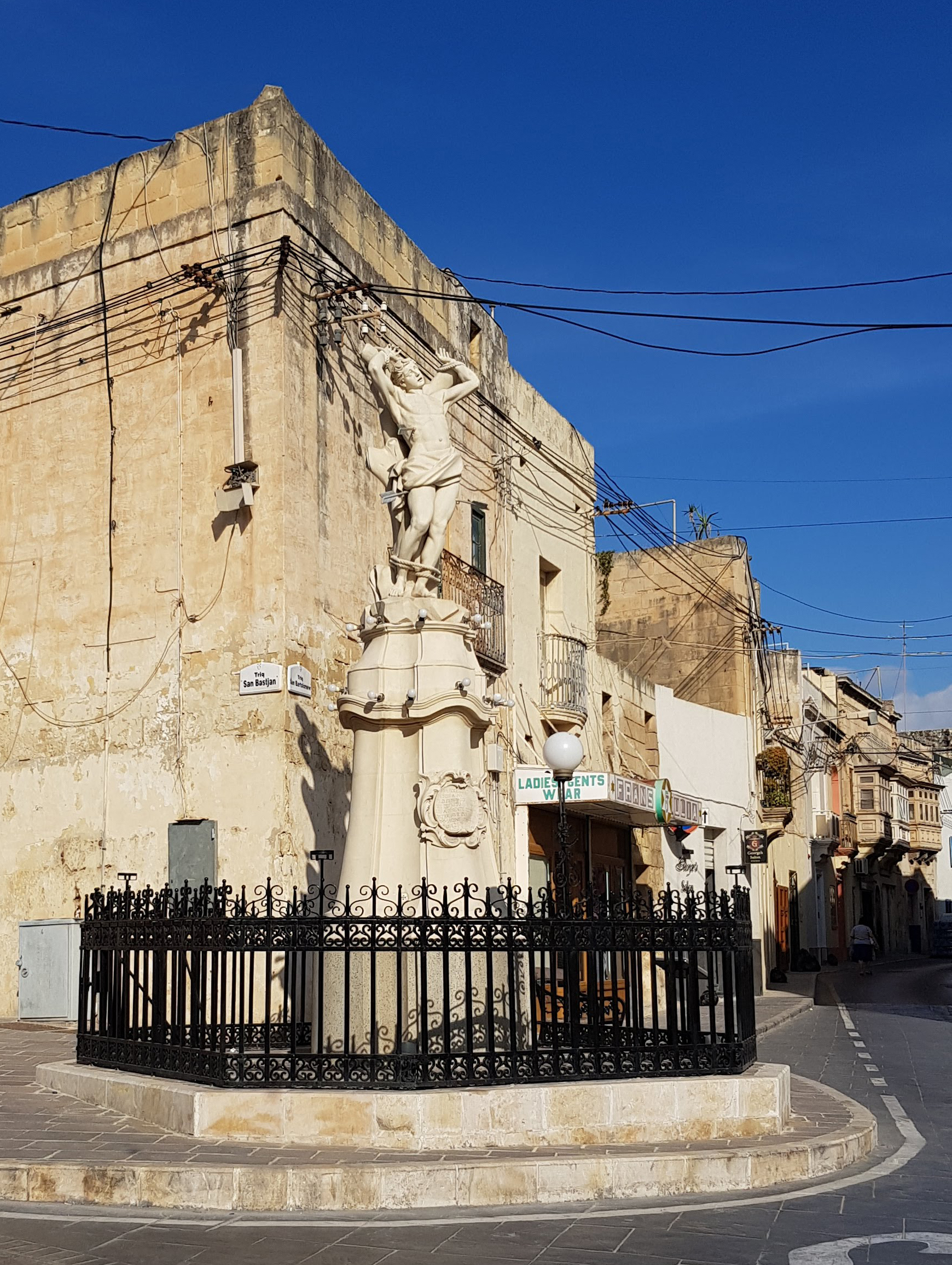
1815 statue of Saint Sebastian near which the church was later built

The veneration of Saint Sebastian, a patron saint of the plague-stricken, began in Qormi in the 16th century, and it was revived in the early 19th century as a result of a plague epidemic in 1813 which killed about 740 people in the town. A statue of the saint which was sculpted by Ċikku and Girolamo Fabri (sometimes alternatively attributed to Vincenzo Dimech) was erected on the outskirts of the town in 1815.

The area around the statue was built up in the 19th and 20th centuries, and in 1873 a master mason Michele Angelo Azzopardi made a petition to Bishop Gaetano Pace Forno to construct a new church for the inhabitants of that area. The bishop granted permission, and the church of St Sebastian was constructed near the statue between 1880 and 1890. The site of the church had been previously occupied by a shop, which was reportedly dismantled at night after its owner had refused to vacate it. It became a vice-parish church on 19 June 1918 and a separate parish in 1935–36. (Note: Bishop Mauro Caruana granted the title of parish church on 25 October 1935, but the first parish priest was not appointed until 5 January 1936.)

The 19th century church was too small for the area's population, so a much larger parish church was built nearby between 1939 and 1980 and it was consecrated in 1986. The old church was neglected after the new building was completed, but it was restored and reopened in 2011 and it is now used as an adoration chapel.In or about 2014 during a Pastoral visit it was noted by Parishioner Vincent Peresso that only a blessing had been performed in 1890. Upon verification the building was formally consecrated as a church by Archbishop Charles Scicluna on 25 October 2019, almost 130 years after it had been completed.

The church building is listed on the National Inventory of the Cultural Property of the Maltese Islands.

== Artworks ==
The church's altarpiece is a 19th-century painting entitled Martyrdom of St Sebastian by Lazzaro Pisani. A painting of Christ the Redeemer, also by Pisani, is located in a side altar. The church also includes sculptures of Christ Resurrected (1981) by Gerolamo Dingli and Jesus falling under the Cross (1985) by Alfred Camilleri Cauchi.
