= Maltese National Hockey League =

Hockey league

- Sport: Hockey
- Founded: 1968; 58 years ago
- No. of teams: 4
- Country: Malta
- Confederation: International Hockey Federation
- Website: www.hockeymalta.com

The Maltese National Hockey League (Lig Nazzjonali tal-Ħoki) is the official field hockey league in Malta.

Four teams currently participate in the National League, with all matches being played at the Kordin National Hockey Centre in Paola.

== Clubs ==
- Sliema Hotsticks Hockey Club
- Young Stars Hockey Club
- White Hart Hockey Club
- Qormi Hockey Club

== History ==
Hockey was introduced in Malta by the British Services in the late nineteenth century. The home of hockey was established at Kordin Complex, which originally consisted of two pitches as well as a cricket pitch and a pavilion. The complex was inaugurated on 17 October 1888 by the then Duke of Edinburgh.

As far back as 2 January 1906 an advertisement appeared in the Daily Malta Chronicle which read "Hockey Sticks to suit all buyers by 30 different makers. From 35 upwards. Apply at Muscat Athletic Outfitter, 270 Strada Reale, Valletta."

Hockey competitions were held regularly in the 1930s and the game fell under the auspices of the Malta Sports’ Association, which organized league and knock-out tournaments, annually up to 1968.

During the fifties, a cavalier side used to play against foreign opposition or against pick British Services teams who happened to be stationed on the Island at the time. The team used unusual playing gear. They sported white shirts beneath waistcoats of various bright colours. The team called itself Zdieri (Maltese for waistcoats). They were the fore-runners of the Maltese National Side.

The Hockey Association Malta, as we know it today, was formed in 1968. Teams represented a cross section of the Maltese society at the time. These were members of the Civil Service, Banks, University students, the teaching profession besides other social clubs pertaining to major establishments. Over the years the league has transformed itself into teams hailing from specific towns and/or schools.

In 2020, Rabat Depiro became the latest club to fold in Malta, leaving only 4 recognised teams on the island.

Despite the Association pledging to promote girls’ hockey, there is still no women's league in Malta.

== Challenge Cup ==
The Challenge Cup takes place every year, typically from October until December, with all 5 team in the National League participating. The 5 teams are placed into 2 groups (consisting of 3 and 2 teams respectively) with teams in each group playing matches against each other to determine who will proceed to the knockout rounds (the group consisting of 2 teams play each other twice). Teams then progress through the knockout until a winner is crowned in the final.

The current Challenge Cup champions are Qormi Daikin, beating Floriana in the final of the 2025/26 season.

== League ==
The league commences immediately following the conclusion of the Challenge Cup. Each of the 4 participating teams play against each other in 3 game rounds.

The National League has been held since 1968. The season is usually scheduled to start in the first weeks of October of each year.

During the current 2025/2026 season, Qormi Daikin clinched the Champions title for the 17th time, with 2 games to spare.

== 9-a-side or Hockey 7s League ==
The 9-a-side hockey league or Hockey 7s takes place annually during the first half of the hockey season. Primarily intended for reserve players, the rules of a match are unchanged from a typical 11-a-side games (except each team fields 9 or 7 players).
