= Sliema Hotsticks Hockey Club =

Field hockey club in Malta

GREE Sliema Hotsticks HC
- Full name: GREE Sliema Hotsticks Hockey Club
- League: Maltese National Hockey League
- Founded: 1975; 51 years ago
- Home ground: Kordin National Hockey Centre

Personnel
- Captain: Shaun Grima
- Manager: Luke Mallia
- Website: www.sliemahotsticks.com
Home	Away

Sliema Hotsticks Hockey Club are one of the oldest field hockey clubs active in Malta. Originated from the town of Sliema.

Hotsticks emerged champions in the Maltese National Hockey League for the season 2021/2022.

They currently play in the top tier of the Maltese National Hockey League.

== History ==
Hotsticks originated in December 1975 when Tony Caruana Smith, then teacher at Naxxar Boys Secondary School, gathered a group of 11-year-old schoolboys and started showing them the basic skills of hockey.

=== Only Juniors ===
In May 1977, Hotsticks Hockey Team took part in the first official HAM competition, entering two teams in an under-18 six-a-side full-pitch tournament. These Hotsticks teams were made up of under 16/14 players. Ten teams had participated in this tournament.

From then on Hotsticks competed regularly in all junior leagues and tournaments. In their first participation in junior leagues, in season 1977/78, Hotsticks won the under-14 league and were runners-up at under-16, losing only in the final to La Salle College. The competition included 8 teams while Hotsticks player David Xuereb won the HAM junior player of the year that season.

=== Senior National League ===
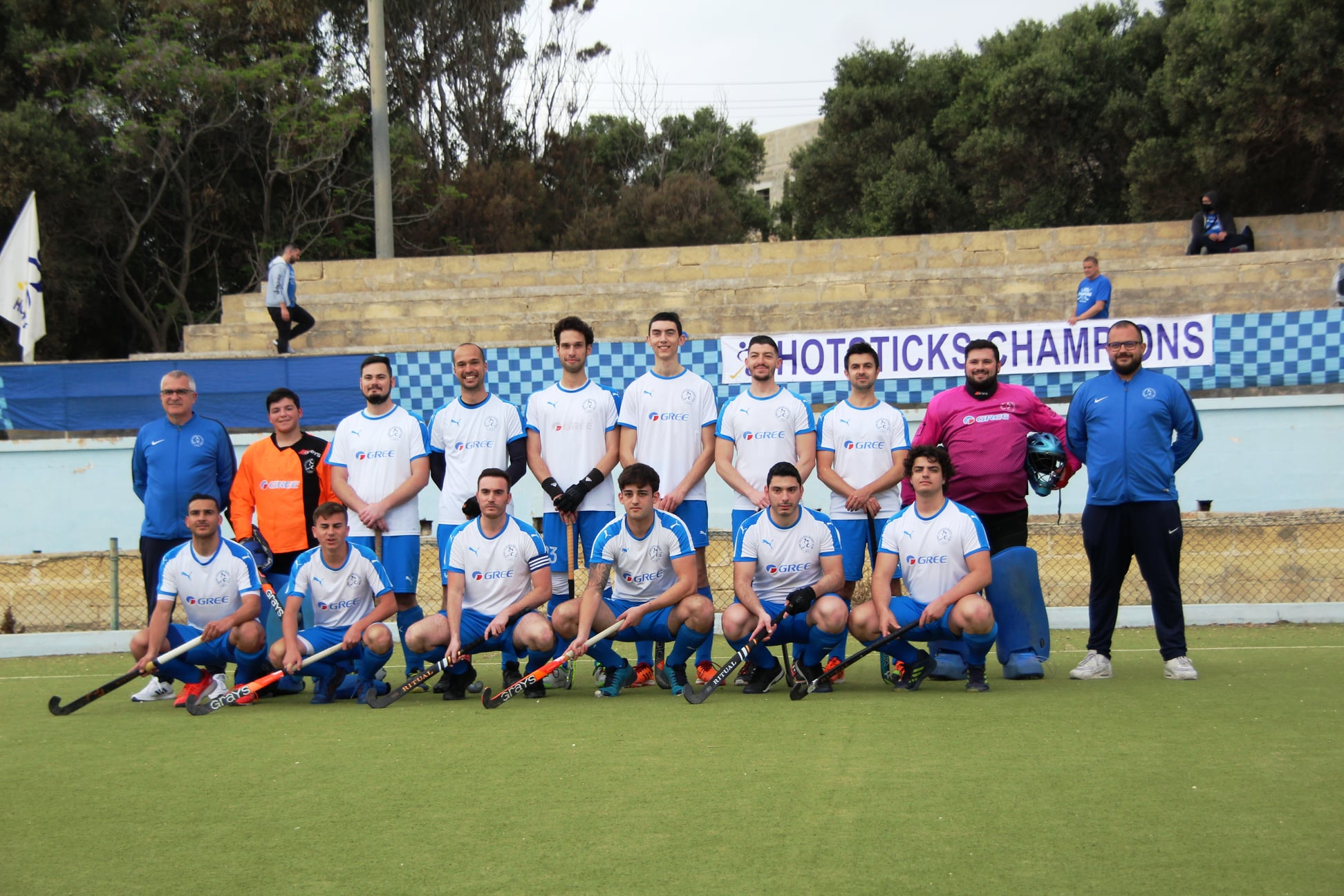
GREE Sliema Hotsticks Squad 2022

In season 1980/81, Hotsticks took part for the first time in the Senior National League. In the first two seasons the team placed last and penultimate, but enthusiasm was abounding.

In 1982/83, Hotsticks obtained 3rd place and took part in the Young Stars International tournament.

The following season, 1983/84, Hotsticks surprised all by winning the National Championship for the first time. All the players were under 20 years of age except for two.

After this glorious season, all ties with Young Stars Hockey Club were ended and Hotsticks established its own independent Club. Later the name Sliema was added to the club name to add more prestige and also because the founder and many of the original players hailed from Sliema and vicinities. There was also a significant period when the club had its clubhouse at Tigne Sliema.

== Present Day ==
=== Indoor Hockey ===
The club were crowned champions of the final indoor league in 2014/15 and went on to compete in the EHF Indoor Championships in Gabrovo, Bulgaria.

=== Challenge Cup ===
Hotsticks were crowned champions of the Challenge Cup in the 2020/21 season.

=== National League ===
The 2021–22 National League was the 53rd season of the National League, the top Maltese league for field hockey clubs since its establishment in 1968. The season was initially scheduled to start on 20 December 2021 but this was delayed until 30 January 2022 as a consequence of the postponement of the previous season's conclusion due to the COVID-19 pandemic.

On April 24, 2022, Hotsticks secured a fifth National League title with one match to spare.

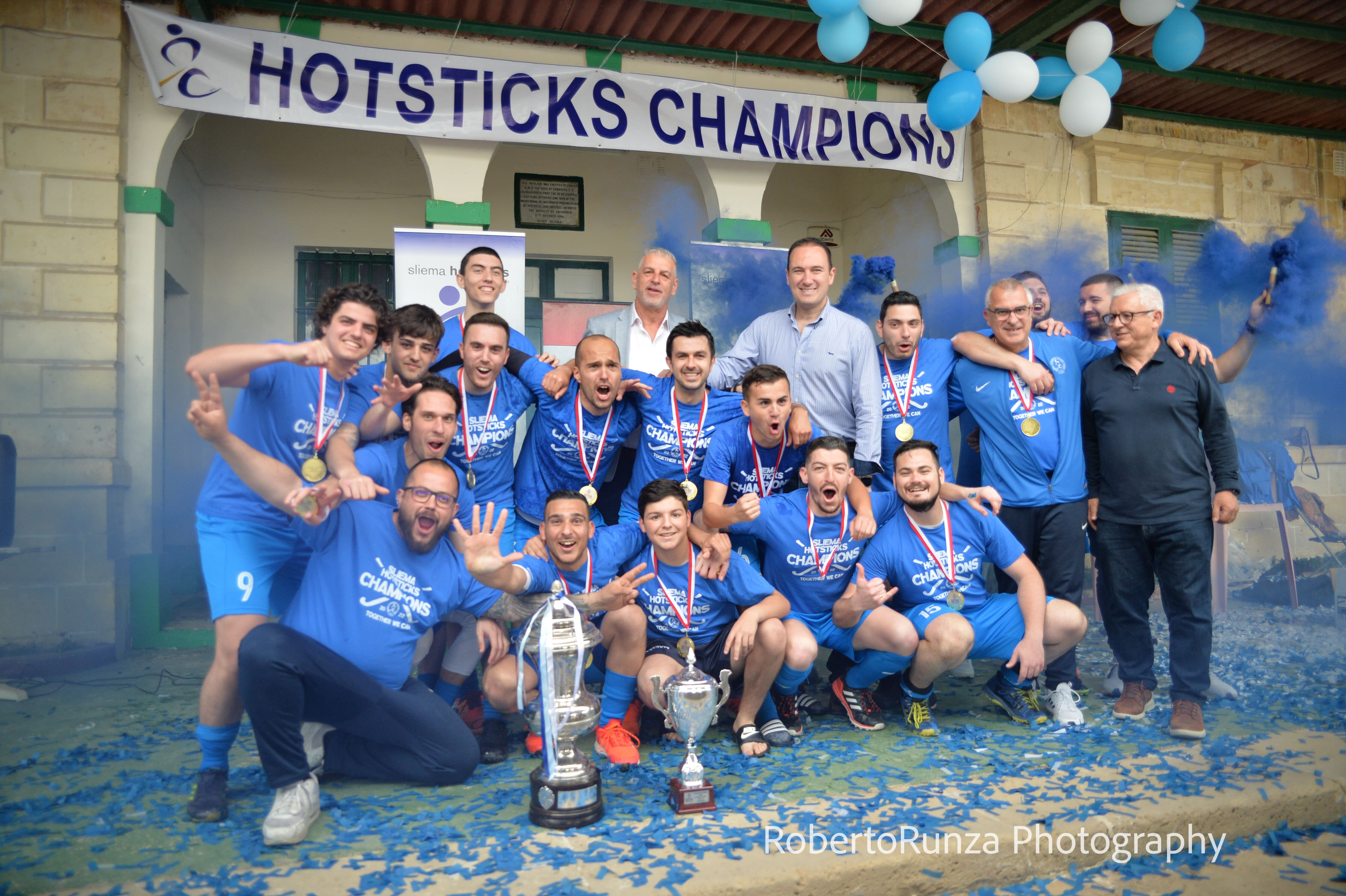
Hotsticks celebrating winning the 2021/22 National League

=== European Competition ===
Sliema Hotsticks became the 2nd Maltese club to represent Malta in the European competitions organised by the European Hockey Federation. Hotsticks successfully organised the last ever EuroHockey Cup Winners Challenge II in Malta in 2007. The tournament was hailed as a big success and the Hotsticks team just failed to reach the semi-finals and finished in 5th place.

Hotsticks have continued to regularly compete in Euro Hockey club events.

== 2022/23 Squad ==
Note: Flags indicate national team as defined under FIFA eligibility rules; some limited exceptions apply. Players may hold more than one non-FIFA nationality.

No.	Pos.	Nation	Player
1	GK	MLT	Ludwig Cole
17	GK	MLT	Emile Borg
—	GK	MLT	Luke Bonnici
—	GK	MLT	Nathan Julian Cardona
3	DF	MLT	Lukas Plaehn
4	DF	MLT	Luke Brincat
6	DF	MLT	Kurt Bonnici
7	DF	MLT	Ryan George
15	DF	MLT	Karl Borg
29	DF	MLT	Charlo Sammut
2	MF	MLT	Christian Sammut
9	MF	MLT	Sean De Marco
10	MF	MLT	Shaun Grima
16	MF	MLT	Alessandro Amore
19	MF	MLT	Gary Bonnici
21	MF	GBR	Alex Bolton
23	MF	MLT	Silas Plaehn
24	MF	MLT	Christ Agius
5	FW	MLT	Ryan Dalli
8	FW	MLT	Jonathan Borg
12	FW	MLT	Luca Runza
13	FW	MLT	David Vella Dingli

Coaches

- Luke Mallia

Notable Past Players

- David Xuereb
- Keith Vella
- Andre Imbroll
- Gaetano Vella

== See also ==
- Maltese National Hockey League
- European Hockey Federation
