= Qormi dialect =

Dialect of Maltese

- Qurmi
- Region: Qormi and surrounding area
- Language family: Afro-Asiatic: Semitic; West Semitic; Central Semitic; Arabic; Maghrebi Arabic; Pre-Hilalian; Sicilian Arabic; Maltese; Qormi dialect
- Writing system: Maltese alphabet

Language codes
- ISO 639-3: –
- IETF: mt-u-sd-mt43
- Qormi in Malta

The Qormi dialect (Qormi dialect: Qurmi, Standard Maltese: Qormi) is a dialect of the Maltese language spoken by inhabitants of Qormi. It is affectionately known as it-Tuf, or in standard Maltese it-Taf, because of the difference in the Maltese word taf 'you know'. The most distinctive feature of the Qormi dialect is its treatment of vowels.

== Phonology ==
The Qormi dialect has the following vowels:

=== Short vowels ===
	Front	Central	Back
Close	i		u
Open		a	

=== Long vowels ===
	Front	Central	Back
Close	ii		uu
Mid	ee		oo
Open		aa	

Vowels in the first syllables are the ones most often affected, but sometimes medial vowels are changed as well. Final vowels, on the other hand, are usually identical to those of the standard language.

=== The vowel A ===
The Maltese vowel a corresponds to the vowel /u/ in the Qormi dialect. If at the end of a word, it is realized as /o/.

English	Maltese	Qormi dialect
steeple (church tower)	kampnar	kampnur
seriousness	serjetà	serjetò
seminary	seminarju	seminurju
potato	patata	patuta
fog	ċpar	ċpur
house	dar	dur

=== The vowel O ===
The vowel o in Maltese often corresponds to /u/ in the Qormi dialect. For example:

English	Maltese	Qormi dialect
we went	morna	murna
go (imperative 3rd pers. pl.)	morru	murru
spring coil	molla	mulla
car	karozza	karuzza
glue	kolla	kulla
postage stamp	bolla	bulla
St George	San Ġorġ	San Ġurġ

This form happens to almost all words that have the vowel o in the first syllable, although there may be exceptions.

=== Vowels after Għ ===
The vowels after the għ change their sound as well.

- The syllable għi, instead of as /aj/, is pronounced as /ej/. For example, in the dialect, għid il-kbir 'Easter' is pronounced like ejd il-kbir instead of ajd il-kbir in the standard.
- The syllable għe, instead of with /e/, is pronounced with /a/. For example, in the dialect, qiegħed 'to stay' is pronounced like qijad instead of qijed in the standard.
- The syllable għu, instead of as /ow/, is pronounced as /ew/. For example, in the dialect, għuda 'piece of wood' is pronounced like ewda instead of owda in the standard.

=== Exceptions ===
Although there may be exceptions, such as kollha 'all of it', which is pronounced like killha in the dialect, and meta 'when' like mita, one must note that the vowels are almost never lengthened, and their accent remains the normal Maltese one.
