= Liceo Vassalli Junior Lyceum =

Coordinates: 35°52′11″N 14°28′18″E

The Liceo M.A. Vassalli is situated in Tal-Ħandaq, Qormi (Malta) on the site of the former Royal Naval School Tal-Handaq (1947–1978). The Junior Lyceum was founded in 1981, and offers secondary education to male students aged 10 to 16. The school complex is characterized by Nissen huts and small blocks in a random layout. Having formerly been a barracks during World War II this layout intended to give the site resemblance with a Maltese village, in order to give camouflage from the air.

The present uniform consists of a white shirt, green tie, grey jersey, dark grey trousers and a green pinstriped blazer

This school was extremely popular in the 1980s when it was run by its energetic headmaster, John Michael Testa. A number of prominent Maltese people attended the school including members of parliament David Agius, Clyde Puli (Partit Nazzjonalista) and Carmelo Abela (Partit Laburista) and others Mario Farrugia Borg, High Commissioner of Malta in Australia, Jason Micallef - former Partit Laburista General Secretary and head of Valletta 2018 European Capital of Culture, Anton Miceli - Culture Official, Massimo Ellul - international marketer, Terence Farrugia - Bay Radio Station Manager, and several lecturers at the University of Malta). Converted British Forces huts and buildings surrounding the school's theatre were the backdrop of the school, which made it the only secondary school in Malta where students went to their teachers instead of the other way round.

The school was demolished in the late 2000's, replaced by a public middle school (previously a private school).
