= Tal-Ħandaq =

Area in Qormi, Malta

Coordinates: 35°52′13″N 14°28′10″E

Tal-Ħandaq is an area in Qormi, Malta. It is a low hill, situated on the left side of Mdina Road in Qormi.

== History ==
In the old days it was a rural area, with a few farms. In the 19th century, the British established a barracks up the hill. Between January 1947 and July 1978, Tal-Ħandaq was the site of the Royal Naval School Tal-Handaq. The site re-opened as a new school in September 1981 as the Liceo Vassalli Junior Lyceum.

In the 1980s, the Malta Environment and Planning Authority (MEPA) started to issue permissions for houses to be built. However, after some residents settled there, plans were changed and Tal-Ħandaq was changed to an Industrial Zone and was renamed to Tal-Ħandaq Industrial Estate'.

== Present Day ==
Nowadays, although some residents and a few farms remain, the area has flourished with an extensive number of small businesses, the most common being panel beating and spray painting, stoneworks, steelworks and woodworks. There is also a film studio.
