= Philip Mizzi =

Maltese Actor (1945)

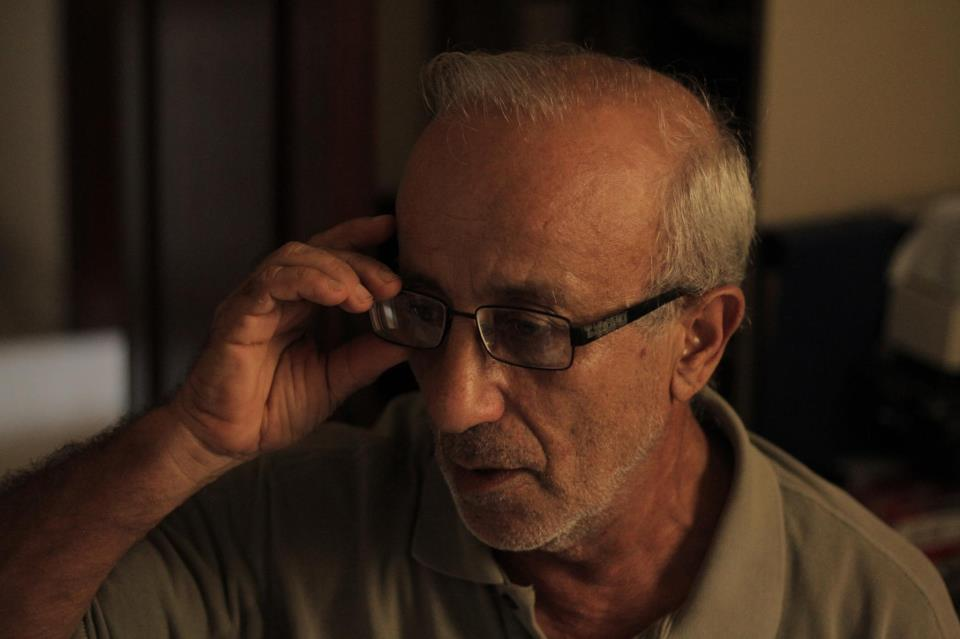
- Philip in 2010
- Born: 27 August 1945 (age 80); Qormi, Malta
- Occupation: Actor
- Years active: 1979–present

Philip Mizzi (born 27 August 1945, Qormi, Malta) is a Maltese actor with a varied body of work on stage, television and film. He has performed in feature and short films such as Agora, Sinbad, Plangent Rain, The Isle and portrayed the protagonist Paul in the award-winning short film In the End.

== Early life ==
Philip Mizzi was born to Carmel and Nazzarena (née Psaila) Mizzi, the eldest of ten siblings. His father, a local cinema projectionist kindled his love for the visual arts. His main pastime was analyzing films. Although he wanted to follow an acting course, he had to put these plans on hold. After he left school, he gained employment to help his parent financially to raise his younger siblings. It was only after he married, he seized on the opportunity and enrolled in an acting course at the MTADA.

== Career ==
His first television production was the religious inquisitive drama, Kristu fl-Izbarra, in 1979. He took on various roles and characters and had a monologue in the studio setup part of the teleplay. After this experience, he embarked on one of the most eclectic stage career portraying characters in plays like Saturday, Sunday, Monday by Eduardo De Filippo and as "Vinnie" in The Odd Couple.

In 1982, he traveled to London as part of The Young Atturi with the production of The Idiot King written by Saviour Pirotta. This got him to perform for disadvantage children in the London area. Another memorable experience was performing the Russian play, Evening Light in Moscow and St Petersburg in 1991. As part of the Maltese dramatic company Atturi, they also performed Saturday, Sunday, Monday for a Russian audience when the USSR was being dismantled.

In 1992, he joined the team of Christopher Columbus-The Discovery as a Crowd Marshal. He was in charge of extras casting for principal photography in Malta. This experience inspired him to conceive and expand the INGUARDIA parade with other various re-enactments like Birgu by Candlelight, The Mdina Festival and the traditional Maltese weddings in Mdina, Valletta, Mgarr and Qormi.

His recent performance was as Paul in the short film In the end, for which Philip was awarded the Best Performance award in the Malta Cine-Circle National Film Competition. The film went on to win two other International awards in the New York International Film Festival and The Indie in California.

== Personal life ==
Philip is married to MaryAnn Cardona and has two sons, Alexis and Ramon. He still lives in Qormi and is still actively involved in the organizations of annual events and ceremonies.
