= Church of St Sebastian, Qormi =

Parish Church of St Sebastian
- Knisja Parrokjali ta' San Sebastjan
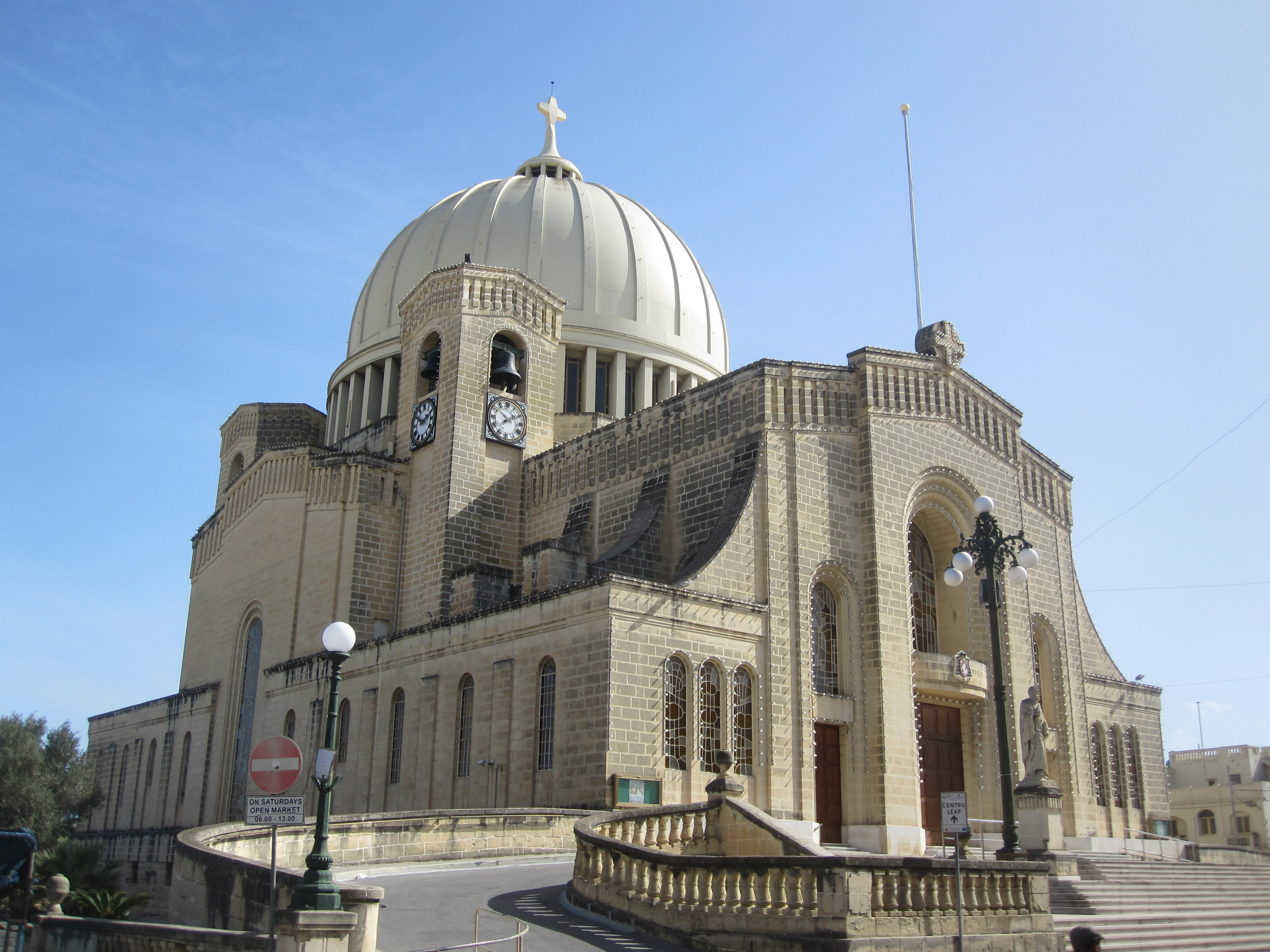
- Parish Church of St Sebastian
- 35°52′37.4″N 14°28′36.8″E
- Location: Qormi, Malta
- Denomination: Roman Catholic
- Website: Website of the church

History
- Status: Active
- Dedication: Saint Sebastian
- Dedicated: 19 January 1986

Architecture
- Functional status: Parish church
- Architectural type: Church

Administration
- Archdiocese: Malta
- Parish: Qormi

Clergy
- Rector: Ewkarist Zammit

The Parish Church of St Sebastian is a 20th-century Roman Catholic Parish church in Qormi, Malta.

== Old Chapel ==
The original chapel dedicated to St Sebastian was mentioned in accounts by inquisitor Pietro Dusina on his visit on 2 February 1575. Dusina describes the chapel lacking in necessarily means to celebrate the mass.

== Old Church ==
Years later, in 1873, as the population of Qormi increased, a builder named Michelangelo Azzopardi proposed to the Bishop of Malta plans to build a bigger church instead of the old chapel. In 1880 work commenced on the building of the new church which was blessed by the Vicar General Guzeppi Mercieca on March 9, 1890.

On July 19, 1918, Archbishop Mauro Caruana made the church a subsidiary parish church, meaning that the church had the duty to minister to the surrounding people as a parish church under the authority the main parish church of St George. The church of St Sebastian eventually became an independent parish on 25 October 1935.

== New Church ==
In 1937 new plans were made to build a larger church to serve as the parish church. Plans were made to acquire land nearby from the government which was granted a year later. In 1939, the designs for the new church were made by Arthur Zammit and presented by Annetto Mifsud Ellul. On February 4, 1940 the first work commenced on the building of the new church. The cornerstone was laid on 27 January 1946 by Archbishop Mikiel Gonzi. The crypt of the church was completed by 1952 and was blessed that same year were services commenced. In 1956 work on the building of the church was halted due to lack of funds. Work commenced 2 years later. The church was finally finished in the early 1980s and consecrated on January 19, 1986 by Archbishop Joseph Mercieca. The Titular Feast of St Sebastian is celebrated annually on the third Sunday of July. Currently, the parish's rector is Ewkarist Zammit.
