= Dejma =

- Id-Dejma
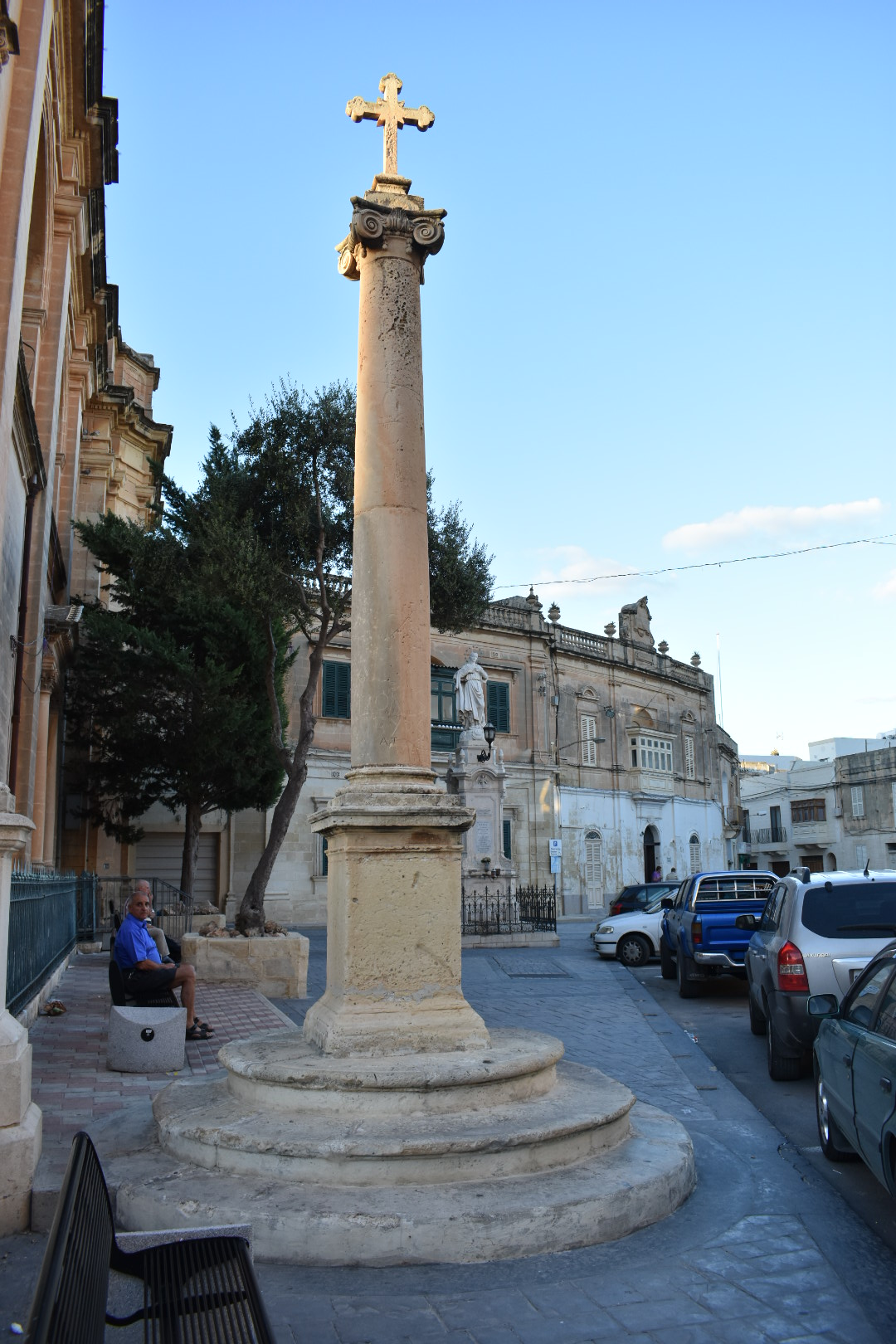
- The Dejma Cross in Luqa
- Founded: 1462
- Disbanded: 1698

Leadership
- Chief of Defence: Grand Master of the Knights Hospitaller

The Dejma (Maltese: Id-Dejma) was a 14th-century mercenary combatant force dedicated to protect the Maltese Islands in case of a raid on one or more of the island's towns. The first reference to this was in 1417 in a Militia Roster which also gave insight to population.

== Creation ==
According to Wettinger, in 1375, the task of organising a "town guard" was given to Phillipe de Marino. In 1390 the Counts and/or Marquises gave the duty of organising this "town guard" to the mayors but on Sept.1 1400, King Martin declared that the mayors were to no longer run these town guards and for this duty to be managed by the Jurats and town council.

== Duties ==
In the case of an attack on the islands, a fire would be lit on top of the several watchtowers on the Maltese Coast. The smoke from the fire (or the fire itself if it was night) would be seen from other watchtowers, who would do the same. This cycle would be repeated until all of the watchtowers were alerted. Upon seeing the smoke (or fire), the soldiers themselves would meet up at various designated locations around the islands. These locations would be marked by a customary "Dejma Cross" (Maltese Salib Tad-Dejma). Upon arriving, the soldiers would prepare for battle. The civilians, on the other hand would make their way to one of the two fortified cities: Mdina or Cittadella. (Valletta too if the attack occurred after the Great siege.)
