= Qormi Hockey Club =

Qormi Daikin HC
- Full name: Qormi Hockey Club
- League: Maltese National Hockey League
- Founded: 1971; 55 years ago
- Home ground: Qormi Hockey Club, Manuel Dimech Street, Qormi

Personnel
- Captain: Steve Tanti
- Coach: Andre Ghio
Home

Qormi Hockey Club is a field hockey club from Malta, founded in 1971. The club kept the National Champions title for yet another year, reflecting its continued success in Maltese hockey competitions.

== History ==
Qormi Hockey Club is widely recognized as one of the pioneering hockey teams in Malta. It was indeed established in 1971 and is commonly credited as the first organized hockey club in the country.

A teacher at the then Ġużé Galea Secondary School, in San Ġorġ, Joseph Kerr, called Chossie (or Ċossi), formed hockey team made up of students. Kerr acted as the first coach.

Led by Head Coach Andre Ghio, Qormi Hockey Club won numerous honours over the past years.

During Season 2024/2025, Qormi Hockey Club seniors team won every title and competition in Malta, including Super Cup, Challenge Cup, Hockey 5s, Hockey 7s, Knock Out and National League. The Champions won the national league for the 17th time in 2025/2026 with 2 games left to play.

https://sport.timesofmalta.com/2026/03/25/qormi-daikin-crowned-hockey-championship-for-the-17th-time/

== Nursery ==
The club operates an academy to nurse young players. Teams of Under 10, Under12, Under 14, Under 16 and Under 18 are fielded.

== Squad in 2019/20 ==
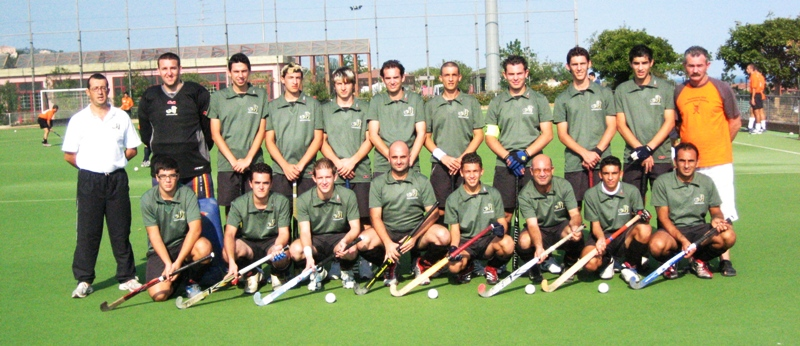
A team photo of Qormi Hockey Team

No.	Player	Pos.	Nat.
1	Shamison Mifsud	Goalkeeper	(Malta)
4	Keith Bajada	Attacker	(Malta)
5	Joseph Cuschieri	Defender	(Malta)
6	Clayton Gatt	Midfielder	(Malta)
8	Zachary DeGiovanni	Midfielder	(Malta)
10	Steve Tanti	Attacker	(Malta)
9	Ayrton Falzon	Attacker	(Malta)
13	Juan Sarcia	Defender	(Malta)
16	John Williams	Defender	(Malta)
17	Keith Calleja	Midfielder	(Malta)
18	Axel Cauchi	Midfielder	(Malta)
19	Isaac Mansueto	Defender	(Malta)
20	Steve Portelli	Defender	(Malta)
23	Luke Bajada	Midfielder	(Malta)
24	Jeremy Farrugia	Goalkeeper	(Malta)
27	Shawn Dimech	Defender	(Malta)
28	Kurt Grixti	Defender	(Malta)
32	Duncan Edwards	Midfielder	(Republic of Ireland)
36	Aaron Spiteri	Goalkeeper	(Malta)

== See also ==
- Maltese National Hockey League
