= Parish Church of St George, Qormi =

Church of St George
- The Collegiate Archmatrix Parish Church of Saint George
- Knisja Kolleġġjata Arċipretali u Arcimatriċi ta' San Ġorġ
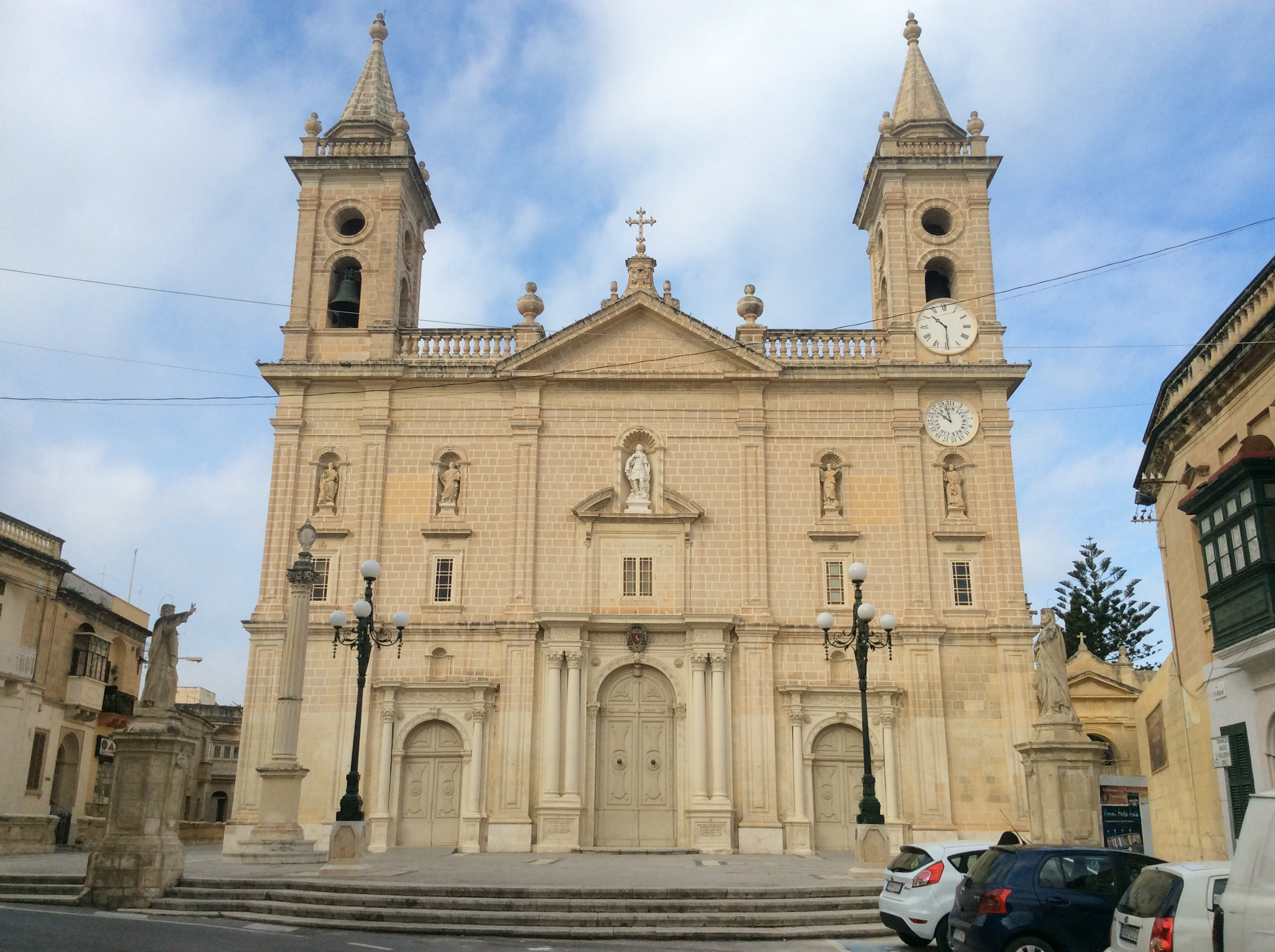
- Church of St George
- 35°52′55.9″N 14°28′05.6″E
- Location: Qormi, Malta
- Denomination: Roman Catholic

History
- Status: Active
- Dedication: Saint George
- Dedicated: 6 May 1731

Architecture
- Functional status: Parish church
- Architectural type: Church
- Style: Baroque

Specifications
- Materials: Limestone

Administration
- Archdiocese: Malta
- Parish: Qormi

The Church of St George is a 16th-century baroque Roman Catholic parish church located in Qormi, Malta.

== History ==
The parish of St George is one of the 12 parishes mentioned in the rollo of Bishop Senatore de Mello in 1436. The church structure was built three times. The original parish church was demolished and a larger one was built on the same site in the mid-15th century. The church was then reconstructed in a larger form around 1585. The dome was added in 1684 on designs by Lorenzo Gafà. The church was consecrated on May 6, 1731. The church was elevated to the status of Collegiate church on 30 June 2019.

== Works of art ==
The church is the home of the last work by Mattia Preti depicting the martyrdom of St George. In the background of this painting one can see a young St George on horseback in the act of killing the dragon to save the princess. The details is the same as the St george that Preti had executed for the Chapel of Aragon in St John's Co-cathedral in Valletta. It is also the home of another important work of art by Mattia Preti, depicting the Eternal Father. This church is also the custody of one of the few existing retables in Malta. It is a pala d'altare which dates to approximately the middle of the 15th century. This pala d'alatre consists of four different panels. The central panel depicting Our Lady of Sorrows. The other panels depicts St George, St Gregory, and Christ on the cross.
