= Qormi =

Qormi Ħal Qormi Città Pinto, Casal Fornaro, Casal Curmi
- City and Local council
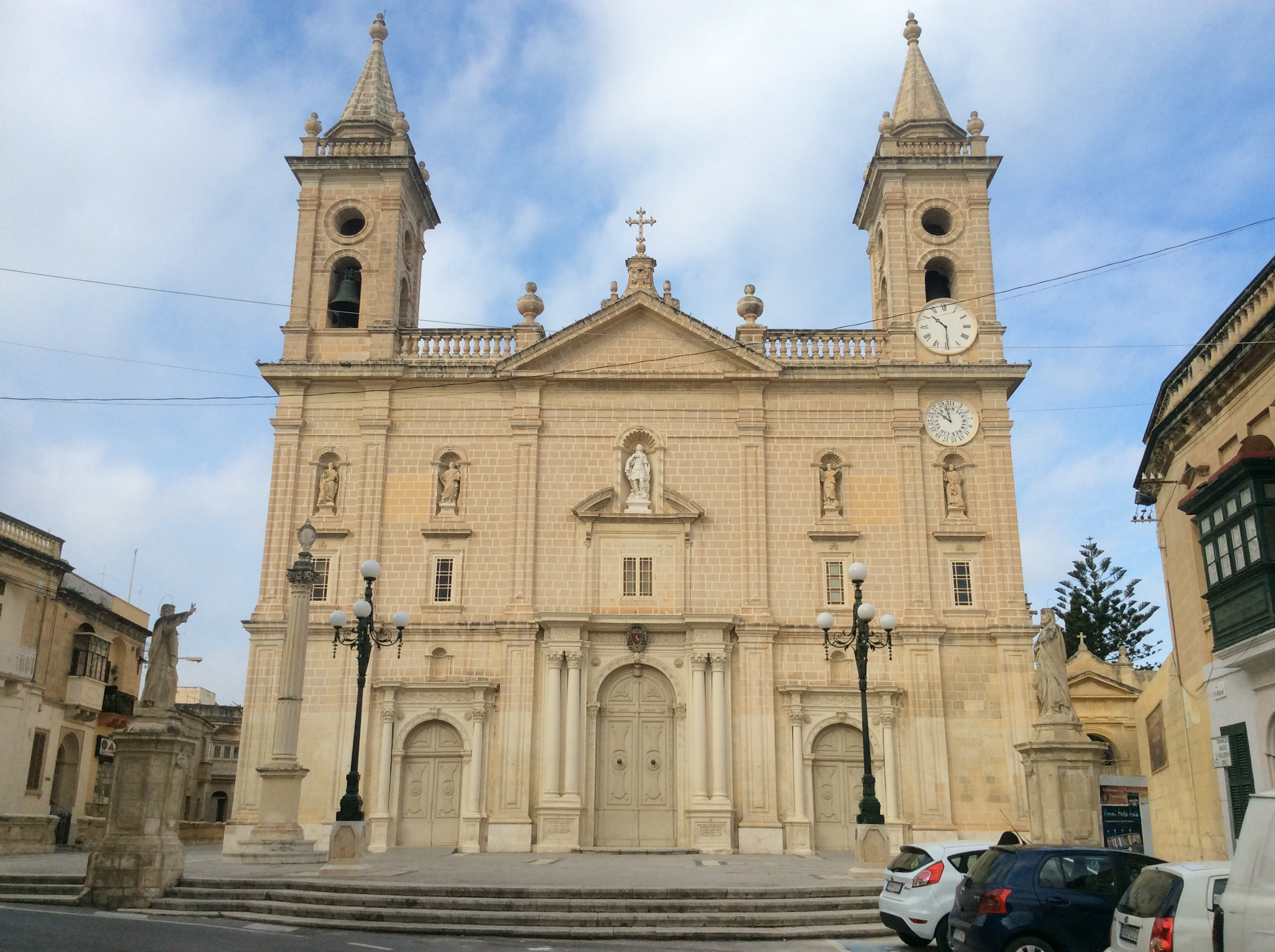
- View of the Church of Saint George

- Flag Coat of arms
- Motto: Altior ab Imo (Rising from the Low)
- Coordinates: 35°52′46″N 14°28′20″E
- Country: Malta
- Region: Southern Region
- District: Northern Harbour District
- Borders: Attard, Balzan, Birkirkara, Ħamrun, Luqa, Marsa, Santa Venera, Siġġiewi, Żebbuġ

Government
  - Mayor: Dr. Josef Masini Vento (Nutar)

Area
  - Total: 5 km^{2} (1.9 sq mi)

Population (Jul. 2024)
  - Total: 19,752
  - Density: 4,000/km^{2} (10,000/sq mi)
- Demonym(s): Qormi (m), Qormija (f), Qormin/Qriema (pl)
- Time zone: UTC+1 (CET)
  - Summer (DST): UTC+2 (CEST)
- Postal code: QRM
- Dialing code: 356
- ISO 3166 code: MT-43
- Zones: Fuq tal-Blat, Ħara l-Belha, San Bastjan, San Dwardu, San Ġorġ, Ta' Farsina, Tal-Ħandaq, Tal-Ħlas, il-Vitorja, il-Wied.
- Patron saint: St. George; St. Sebastian
- Day of festa: Last Sunday of June (St. George); 3rd Sunday of July (St. Sebastian)
- Website: qormilc.gov.mt/en/

Qormi (Maltese: Ħal Qormi, [ħɐl ˈʔɔrmɪ], locally [ħɐl ˈʔʊrmɪ]), also known by its title Città Pinto, is a city in the Southern Region of Malta, southwest of Valletta in the centre of the island. It had a population of 16,324 (as of March 2018), making it Malta's fifth-largest city. The population of Qormi was 19,752 in July 2024. This included 10,664 males and 9,088 females; 15,727 Maltese nationals and 4,025 foreign nationals.

Qormi has two parishes, one dedicated to Saint George and one to Saint Sebastian. It contains two valleys: Wied il-Kbir (The Large Valley) and Wied is-Sewda (Black Valley). Its bordering towns are Marsa, Luqa, Żebbuġ, Siġġiewi, Ħamrun, Birkirkara, Attard, Santa Venera and Balzan.

Elder inhabitants of Qormi speak a broad Qormi Dialect, which is now in decline.

== Etymology ==
The name Qormi is most likely derived from the surname Curmi, which is documented in Sicily as of 1095. Several other places in Malta derive their names from surnames, including Balzan, Attard and Ghaxaq. When Qormi is mentioned for the first time in the year 1419, only two of twenty people with the surname Curmi lived in the village.

Alternative folk etymologies have been put forward since the 17th century. Domenico Magri connects the toponym to the word curmi as drink. G.F. Abela refers to carm or carme as the Arabic term for vine as origin of the village name. Agius de Soldanis proposed the Greek crumi, collection of water. Finally C. Scicluna likens it to the Greek hormos, harbour, as the Great Harbour used to go inland as far as Qormi. In both latter cases, there is no documentary evidence for any Greek origin of the toponym.

== History ==
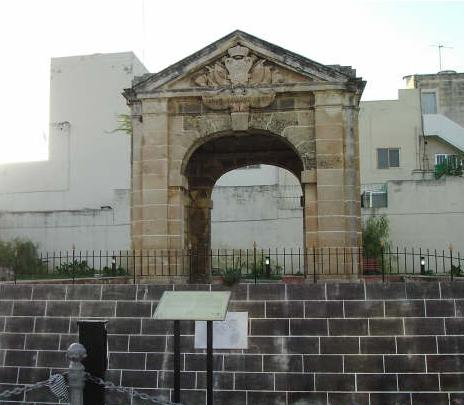
Pinto's Loggia

There are indications of Qormi being inhabited in antiquity. Bronze Age pottery was found in the area known as Stabal indicating presence of humans as early as 1500–800 BC. Punic tombs have been found at St Edward's Street and Tal-Bajjada. Also, some Ancient Roman remains were found in the valley of Wied il-Kbir. However, chances are that in these times, there were only small communities in the whereabouts of Qormi.

In the Middle Ages, Qormi started to grow and prosper, probably due to its proximity to the Grand Harbour and its central position. The first written reference to the town is made in 1417 where it is recorded that the town provided some 100 men to serve in the Dejma, the national guard.

Qormi is likely to have suffered a period of decline during the Great Siege of Malta due to the proximity of the Turkish camp in Marsa.

When Mons. Pietro Dusina, Malta's first Inquisitor and Apostolic Delegate, wrote his report of 1575 he records Qormi as being one of the active parishes administering a large area which today includes Ħamrun and even Valletta. The present St George Parish church was completed in 1684.

In 1743 the town made a plea to Grand Master Manuel Pinto da Fonseca to elevate it to the level of a "city". This was granted and the town received the title of Città Pinto on 25 May 1743. The decree issued by Pinto said "Habita relatione, Terra Curmi erigmus In Civitatem, Imponentes el nomen Pinto", which means that the land of Qormi, to which he gave his own name Pinto, was then given higher dignity from a piece of land to a city, a fact which is now preserved in the locality's Latin motto: "Altior Ab Imo" (which means, rising from the low). Qormi's bakers served most of the island's bread supplies.

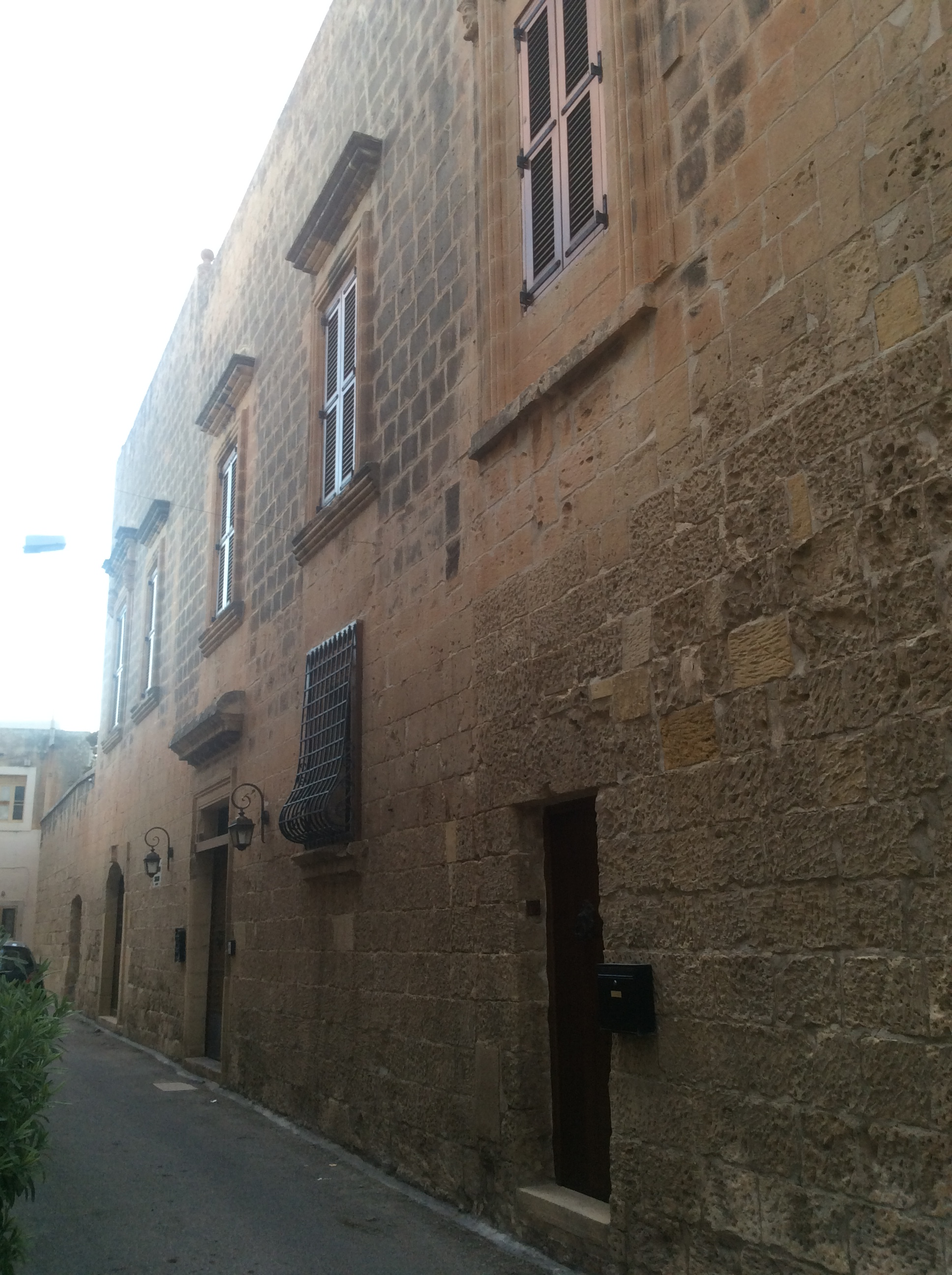
Palazzo Stagno 1589

Qormi also experienced plague, which led to some declines throughout its history. However, during the British rule, Qormi moved on with new institutions opening up, mainly schools. Following 1850 Qormi became one of the largest inhabited centres in Malta, with amenities such as water and electricity, which were somewhat rare in those times. Trade and crafts grew, especially Horse racing which is a hobby that Maltese often attribute to people from Qormi.

During the World Wars, Qormi played a small part as well. In World War I, many people from Qormi were employed at several British bases such as in Thessaloniki, and the ones in Qormi as well, such as the airship station in the area known as Saint Sebastian, which would later become a parish itself. In World War II, people from Qormi formed part of the Armed Forces. Qormi also became a refuge to many people from the Cottonera area, which was badly hit because this area sits off the Grand Harbour, and area which was fiercely attacked by the Axis powers. Qormi, although close, is not exactly in the Grand Harbour region, making it ideal for refuge in those times.

Qormi has two parishes, dedicated to Saint George and Saint Sebastian. Saint George's parish was the first one. However, when Qormi was growing, there was the need for the city to be split into two parishes to facilitate growth. Saint Sebastian was chosen because Qormi had turned to him during times of plague infestation, since he is the protector and patron saint of people ill from plague, according to Catholic tradition. This led to many Qormi citizens carrying the name of Ġorġ (George) and Bastjan (Sebastian) and their equivalents and derivatives.

Nowadays Qormi is the third largest locality in the nation of Malta, with two parishes, several institutions and a local council that governs the locality.

== Governance ==
Local governance existed during the French occupation of Malta in 1798 however this was a limited and short-lived experiment. It was only in the 1990s that local councils were introduced in Malta with the first local council elections in Qormi taking place in 1994. Subsequent elections took place in 1998, 2001, 2004 and 2007.

=== Mayors ===
The following served as Qormi mayors:

- George Portelli: 1994–1997
- Alfred Mallia: 1997–1998
- Clyde Puli: 1998–2001
- Roderick Galdes: 2001–2004
- Jesmond Aquilina: 2004–2012
- Rosianne Cutajar: 2014–2017
- Jesmond Aquilina: 2017–2019
- Renald Falzon: 2019–2020 (unfinished term – died in office)
- Josef Masini Vento: since 2020 (acting from 26 October 2020, sworn on 24 November 2020)

== Healthcare ==
Qormi has a Government Health Centre (colloquially referred to as il-Poliklinik) – situated in San Dwardu Area. In the Wied area, there is also a private boutique hospital, St. Thomas Hospital. Qormi has other various pharmacies and private clinics.

== Culture ==
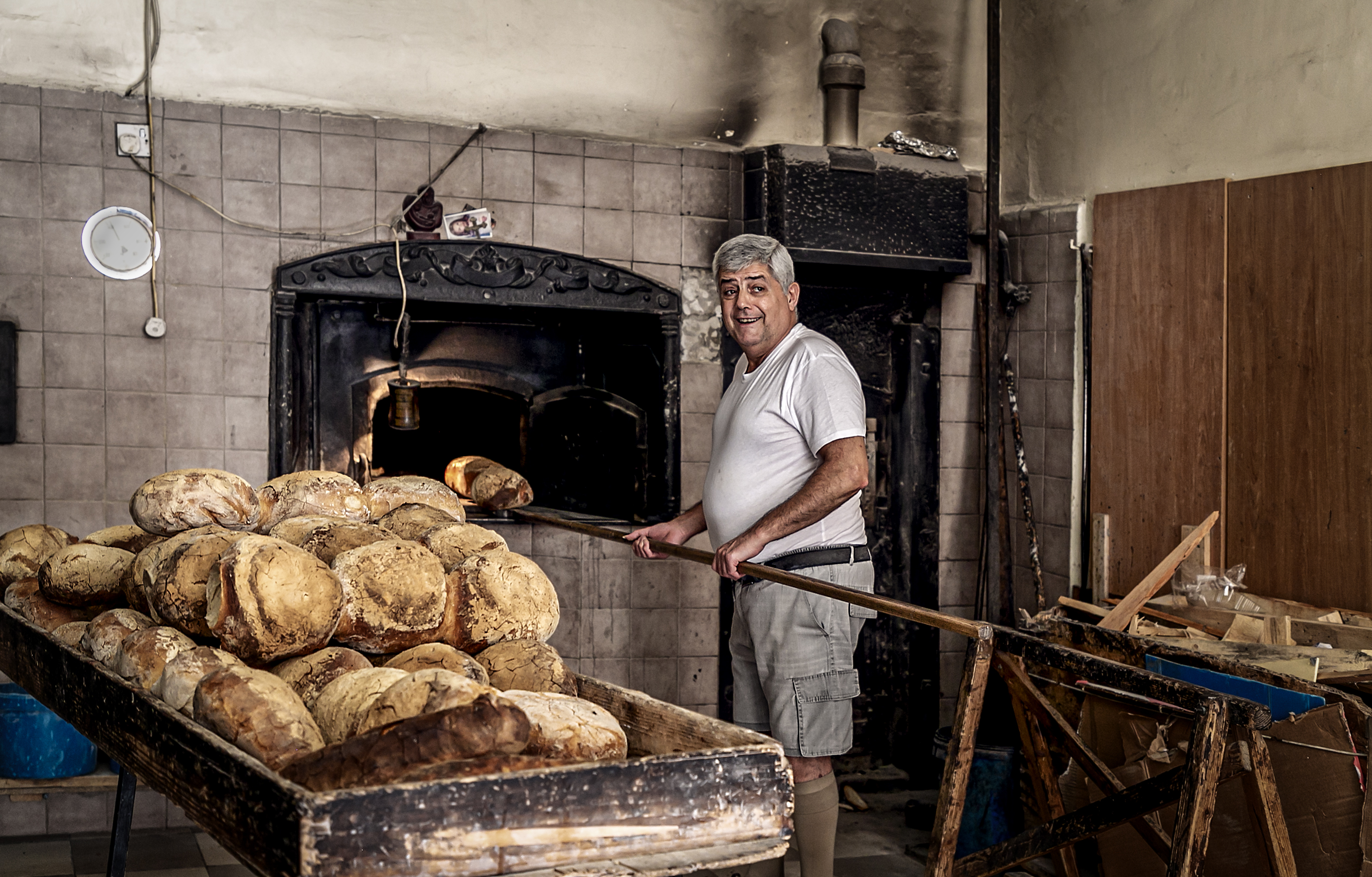
A traditional bread maker in Qormi

=== Cuisine ===
Malta's staple food is bread and Maltese bread is very much sought after. Qormi is recognized nationally as the capital of Maltese bread-making. It boasts the largest number of bakeries in the country, several of which still operate in the traditional manner using wood-fired ovens.

In 2007, Qormi's historical significance was brought to the forefront when it hosted the national event 'Lejl f'Casal Fornaro' (A Night in Casal Fornaro), reminiscent of Qormi's name from centuries ago. This event drew an unprecedented number of attendees, surpassing even the turnout for the traditional feasts. The event's success led to its continuation in 2008 and 2009, with the fourth edition scheduled for October 16, 2010. During this event, visitors may immerse themselves in a traditional Maltese village, where they can enjoy shows and exhibitions that showcase the heritage and traditional life of Qormi. Additionally, they can experience authentic Maltese cuisine.

Qormi also holds an annual Qormi Wine Festival and Malta National Spring Festival. On the third edition of the Malta National Spring Festival in 2011, some Qormi Bakers baked the biggest loaf in the world which weighed two tons and had a diameter of nine feet.

=== Religion ===
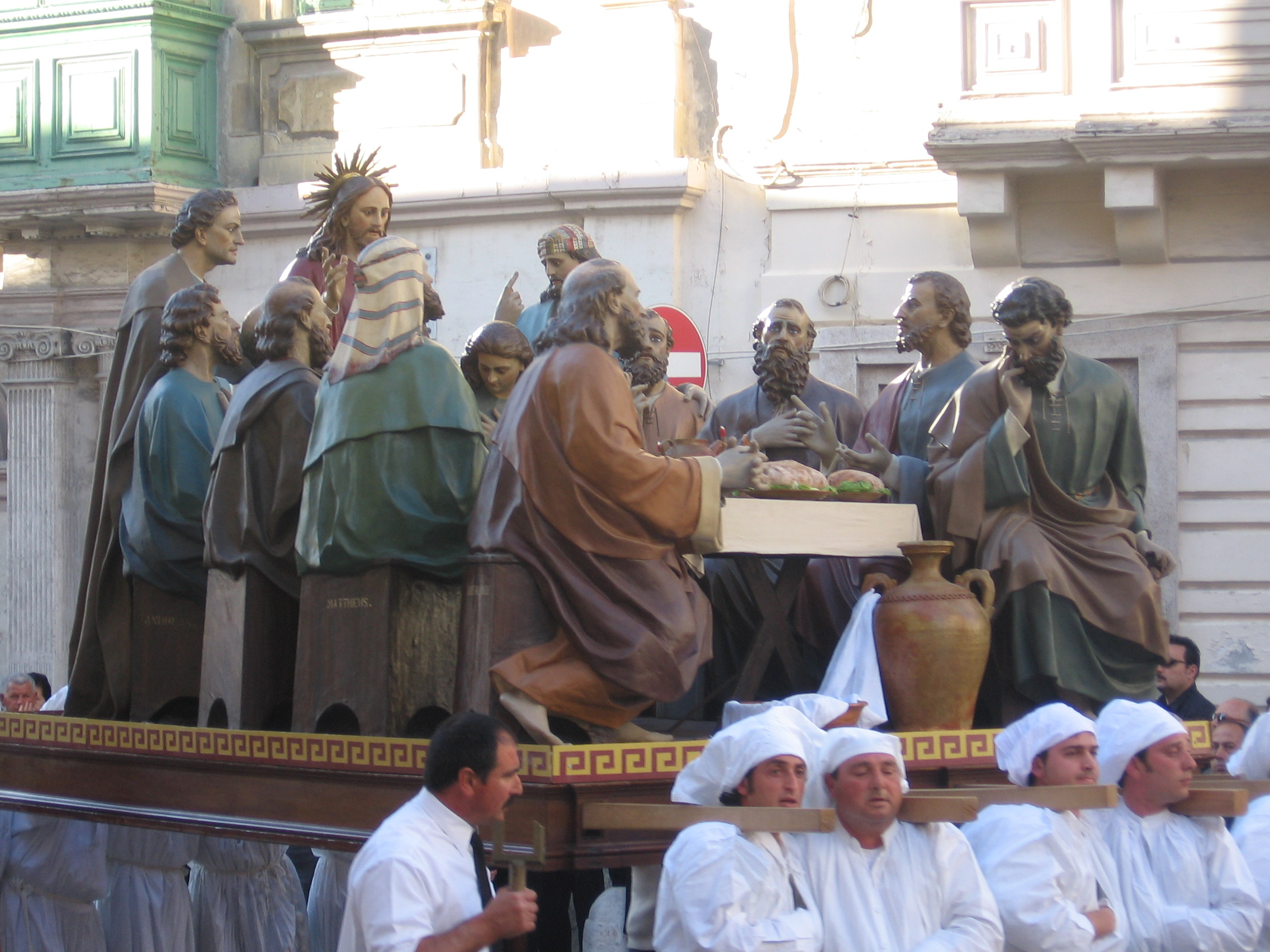
Statue of The Last Supper, used during the Good Friday procession in Qormi.

Qormi has two patron saints which are Saint George and Saint Sebastian.

Qormi is divided into two parishes dedicated to these two saints. The first parish was that of Saint George. The parish of Saint Sebastian was created in 1936 after being made into a subsidiary parish in 1918. The origins of this parish go back to a statue to the saint erected as an act of thanksgiving for deliverance during the plague of 1813 and a small church built in 1880. For two weeks in summer, the town celebrates the feasts of its saints. The feast of Saint George is celebrated in the last Sunday of June, while the feast of Saint Sebastian is celebrated in the third Sunday of July.

The town is also known for its Good Friday procession from the church of Saint George which features a number of life-size statues and over 500 participants.

Good Friday Procession passing through Triq Aniċi, Qormi. Aniċi Band Club, procession participants portraying biblical characters, and onlookers are seen in the photo.

Under the guidance of the St George archpriest, there is the Kumitat Festi Esterni (AD 1919). This committee is responsible for a large number of activities, which raise funds for the organization of the local fiesta. It is the first committee of the sort in Malta.

=== Band clubs ===
- Pinto Philharmonic Society, St. Sebastian Band (Is-Soċjetà Filarmonika Pinto, Banda San Sebastjan)—founded in 1862, apart from being the first band club in Qormi it is also one of the earliest Maltese band clubs, originally in the Saint George parish but later moved to the Saint Sebastian parish due to the parish limits
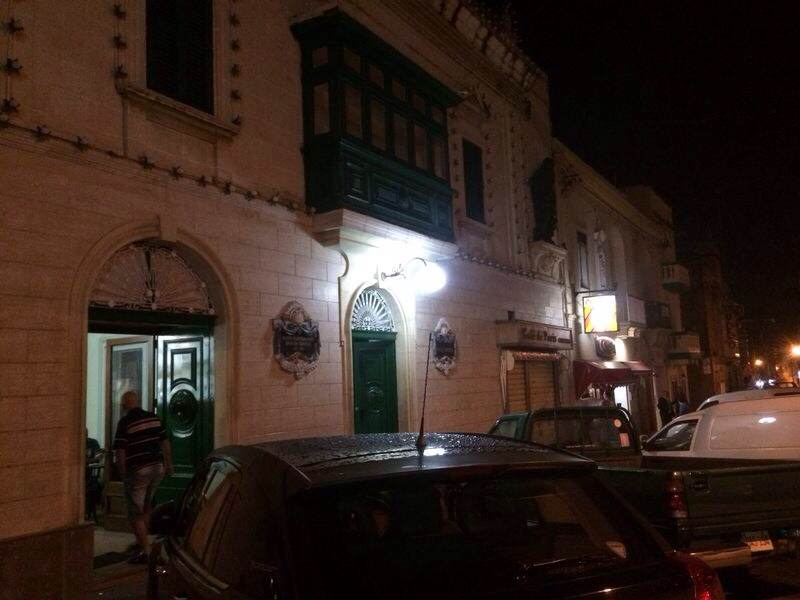
  Is-Soċjeta Filarmonika Pinto, San Sebastjan
- Filarmonica San Giorgio (Għaqda Mużikali San Ġorġ Martri) founded in 1893 in the St George parish. Since its formation the band has actively participated in the organisation of the parish feast and Holy Week activities. The organisation was also very active in the country's struggle to obtain self-government.
- Anici Band & Social Club (L-Għaqda Soċjo Mużikali Anici)—founded in 1988 in the Saint George parish.

=== Media ===
- Qormi has two community radio stations. "Bastjaniżi FM" broadcasts on 95 FM 24 hours a day. The website of Bastjanizi FM features live streaming. This community radio was founded by the four active feast organisations of St. Sebastian—St. Sebastian Firework factory, Ghaqda Armar, Kummisjoni Zghazagh bastjanizi and St. Sebastian Band. "Leħen il-Belt Ġorġjana" is broadcasting on 105.6fm, and opened in April 2008. It brought together all the committees which work in St George's Parish. The only newspaper is a quarterly issue by the Local Council named Id-Dielja ("The Grapevine"), referring to the concentration of vineyards in the old times. The Għaqda Ġuże' Muscat Azzopardi/Awturi Qriema publishes twice yearly Altior ab Imo, sent to its members.

== Neighbourhoods ==
Known in Maltese as Żoni (Zones), Naħat (Sides) or Inħawi (Areas), Qormi is composed of the following neighbourhoods, separated into two different Parroċċi (Parishes), which also denote geographical areas:

Parroċċa San Ġorġ (Parruċċa San Ġorġ)

- San Ġorġ

This is the old village core of Qormi. This area dates back to hundreds of years back, with the Saint George Parish Church dating back all the way to 1436. This area is home to the Għaqda Mużikali San Ġorġ Martri A.D 1893 club.

- Barrakki (Previously known as Ħâra l-Belha (Ħûra l-Bilha))

Along with the San Ġorġ area, this is one of oldest zones of the city. This is essentially a residential area which is situated close to the San Ġorġ area.

- San Franġisk (San Franġesk)

Adjacent to the San Ġorġ area, the San Franġisk area is situated around the Pjazza San Franġisk, which acts as an open space in the heart of Qormi. The square gets its name from an old chapel dedicated to Saint Francis of Paola. In 2015, it was reported that this chapel was to undergo a €68,000 renovation project, €41,000 of which was to be funded by MEPA. The project was finished around a year later and it was said to have cost just over €50,000. Although not very big, this area has served as a space for celebrations, most notably relating to Qormi F.C. wins. This may have been the traditional spot due to the presence of an old bar owned by the football club.

- Il-Wied

The name means "The Valley", and this has been nicknamed so as it is really and truly a part of a valley, due to the low-lying nature of the city. This area has until recently been known for flooding when storms hit Malta. The headquarters and training grounds of Qormi F.C. and the Qormi Youth Nursery, can be found in this area. This complex was renovated and relaunched in 2012 as the Qormi FC Football Complex. In the area, the Qormi Cemetery is also found (Iċ-ċimitierju in the Qormi dialect), as well as a private hospital, launched in 2013 and completed in 2016.

- Tal-Bajjad

This area is the uphill from The Wied area, and mostly it is an industrial and office area, with headquarters of HSBC Malta and PwC Malta. It is infamous for a shootout that occurred in 2005. In 2017, the area was earmarked for a development policy shift to enable potential improvements in the area.

- Tal-Blat
- Ta' Farżina

Close to the Tal-Ħlas area, Ta' Farżina is a residential area, most notably with a large number of blocks of flats.

- Tal-Ħlas (Tal-Ħlus)

Although the area is another residential area, just off Tal-Vitorja, it gets its name from a chapel in the countryside of Qormi (on the side of this area), Tal-Ħlas referring to "Deliverance", or Our Lady of Deliverance.

- Tal-Vitorja (Tal-Viturja)

This is a residential area close to the Saint Sebastian borders. It gets its name from the Chapel dedicated to Our Lady of Victory.

Parroċċa San Bastjan (Parruċċa San Bastjun)

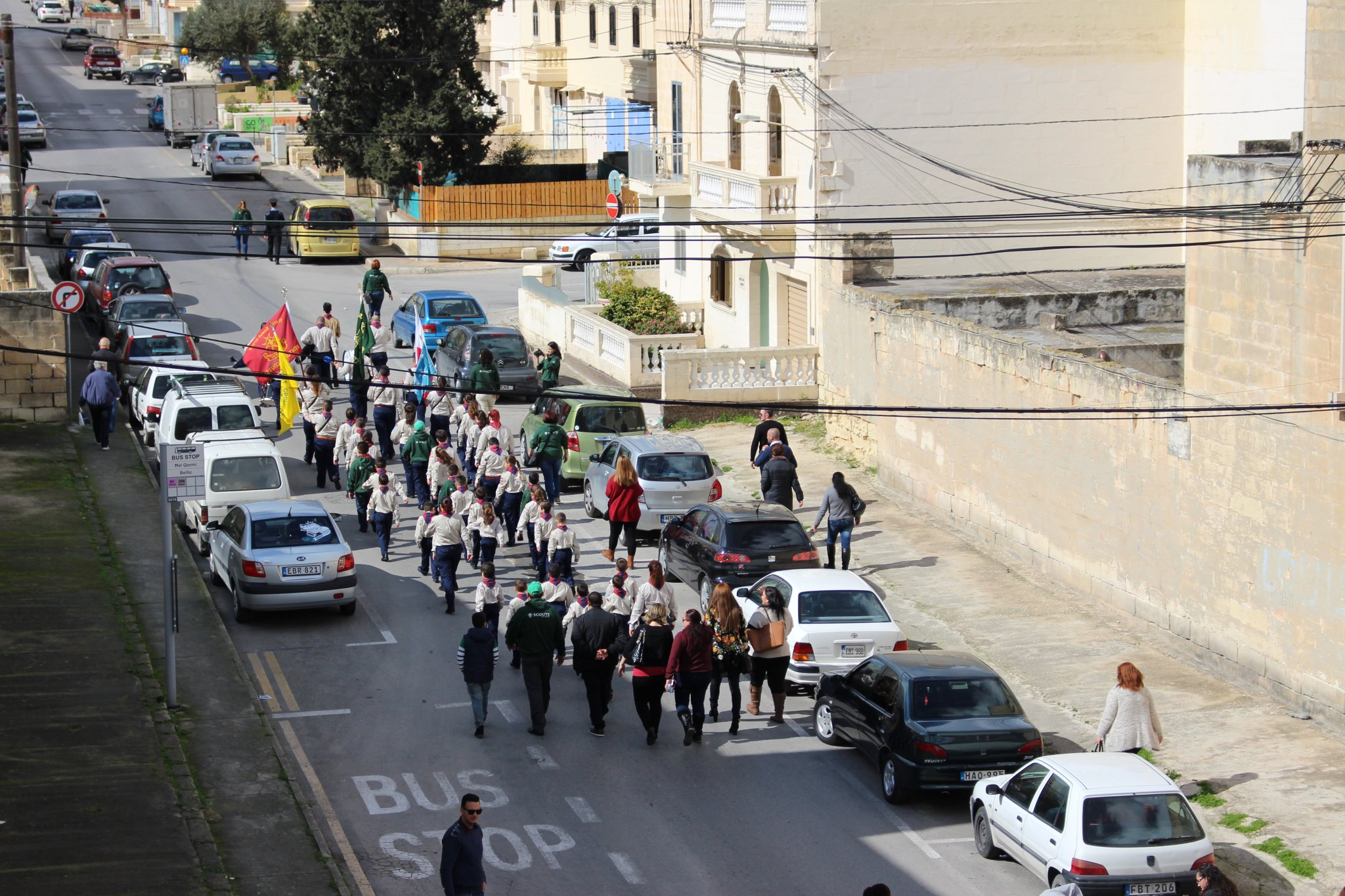
Qormi Scout Group Parade in Saint Edwards, Qormi, Feb 2017

- San Bastjan (San Bastjun)

The newer downtown centre, San Bastjan revolves around the Knisja Parrokkjali ta' San Sebastjan (Parish Church of Saint Sebastian. Not very far, there is the Old Church of Saint Sebastian (Il-Knisja l-Qadima), which has now been converted into a church museum. The Pinto Philarmonic Society każin is situated here.

The area has a small number of bars, cafes and food take away joints, together with grocery shops, stationeries, and other public amenities. The Local Council offices are situated between this area and Tal-Vitorja.

- San Dwardu

San Dwardu is a residential area in the San Sebastjan Parish, taking its name from a principal street in the area, Triq San Dwardu.

- Tal-Ħandaq

Iż-Żona Industrijali Tal-Ħandaq, was first scheduled in 1992 to become a Housing Estate, eventually it was changed to become an Industrial Estate, sitting on the outskirts, on the west side.

- Ta' Paskarella
- Għar Ram

== Sports ==
- Qormi is home to Qormi FC, the football team of the town, playing in yellow and black. The team was promoted to the Maltese Premier League in 2018.
- Qormi is also home to the Qormi Basketball Club, which was established in 1995.
- Qormi Sharks RFC is a Rugby Union team that has moved to Qormi recently.
- Qormi Hockey Club was founded in 1971.

=== List of sport clubs ===
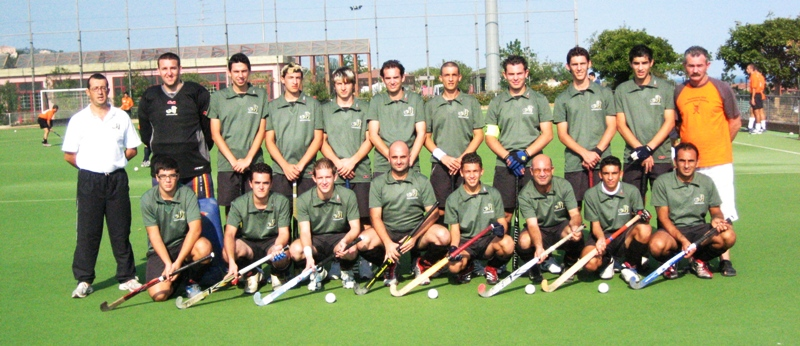
A team photo of Qormi Hockey Team

| Club | Sport | League |
|---|---|---|
| Qormi FC | Football | Maltese Premier League |
| Qormi Hockey Club | Field hockey | Maltese Hockey League |
| Qormi Sharks RFC | Rugby union | Malta Rugby Union National Championship |
| Qormi BC | Basketball | Maltese National Basketball League |
| Qormi Clay Shooting Club | Clay pigeon shooting | |
| Qormi Klabb tal-Boċċi San Sebastjan | Boċċi | |
| Qormi Klabb tal-Boċċi San Ġorġ | Boċċi | |
| Qormi Cycling Club | Cycling | |
| Qormi Athletic Club | Athletics | |
| Ċaċċu Social Club | Pool/Darts | |
| Qormi Pigeon Racing Club | Pigeon racing | |

== Schools ==
=== Kindergarten ===
- Ġużé Muscat Azzopardi Kindergarten, San Bastjan
- St Joseph School (Private Independent School) – Żbandola Street, Qormi

=== Primary ===
- Ġużé Galea Primary School, San Ġorġ
- Ġużé Muscat Azzopardi Primary (A,B), San Bastjan
- St Joseph School (Private Independent School) – Żbandola Street, Qormi

=== Secondary ===
- Liceo Vassalli Junior Lyceum, Tal-Ħandaq, currently known as St Ignatius Handaq Secondary School.
- Ġużé Galea Secondary School, San Ġorġ (ex-lyceum).
- St Ignatius College Middle School.

== Notable people ==
- George Abela – President of Malta (2009–2014), Ex-Chairman of Qormi FC and the Malta Football Association
- Marie Louise Coleiro Preca – President of Malta (2014–2019), long time Member of Parliament and Minister
- John Dalli – Former Member of Parliament, Minister and European Commissioner
- Clyde Puli – Politician, Member of Parliament, Previous Mayor and former Parliamentary Secretary for Youth and Sport
- Roderick Galdes – Politician, Previous Mayor and current Member of Parliament
- Etienne Barbara – International footballer
- Leli Fabri – Retired International footballer and coach
- Claudia Faniello – Pop Singer
- Fabrizio Faniello – Pop Singer, Eurovision Song Contest performer 2001 and 2006
- Olivia Lewis – Pop Singer, Eurovision Song Contest performer 2007
- Gorg Mallia – Academic, writer and cartoonist
- Joseph Calleja – Tenor
- Charles Scicluna – Archbishop of Malta
- Philip Mizzi – Actor
- Miriana Conte – Pop Singer, Eurovision Song Contest performer 2025

== Bibliography ==
- W&R Chambers Limited and Cambridge University Press, Chambers World Gazetteer: an A-Z of Geographical Information, 5th edition, 1988, page 528
- Barry Turner (ed.), The Statesman's Yearbook: The Politics, Cultures and Economies of the World 2005, Palgrave Macmillan, page 1113
