= Valletta =

Capital of Malta

Valletta Il-Belt Valletta (Maltese) Città Umilissima
- Capital city and local council
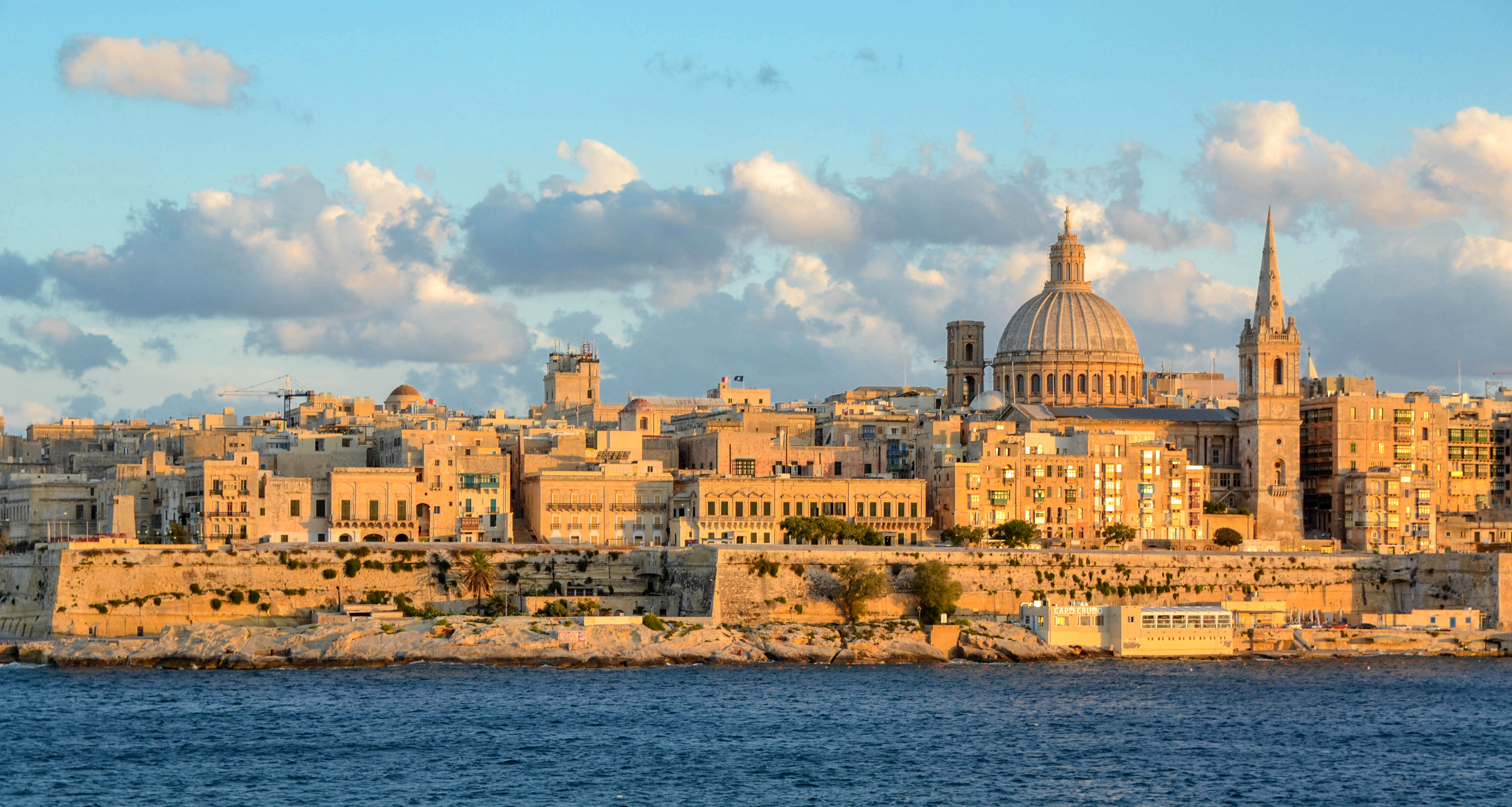
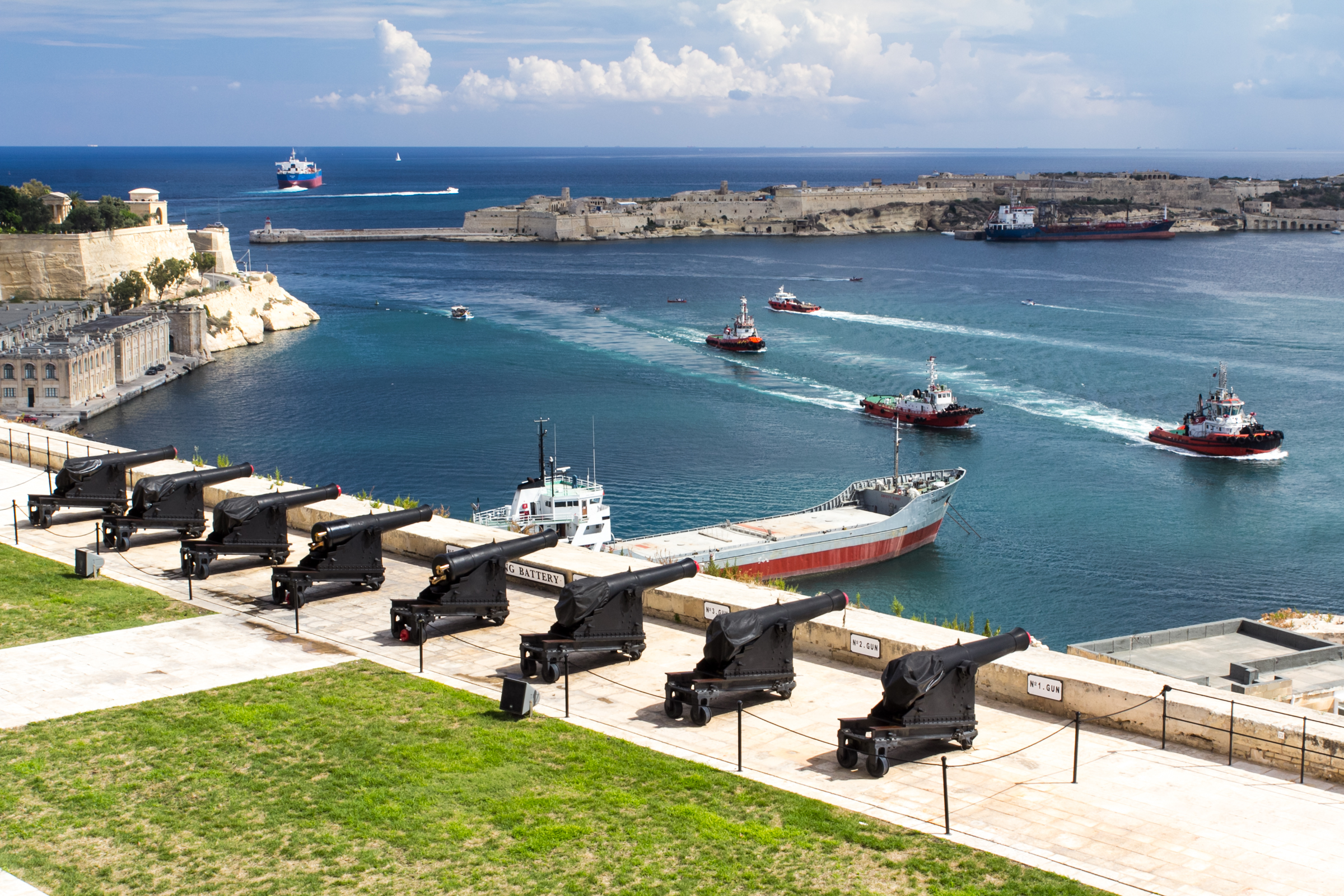
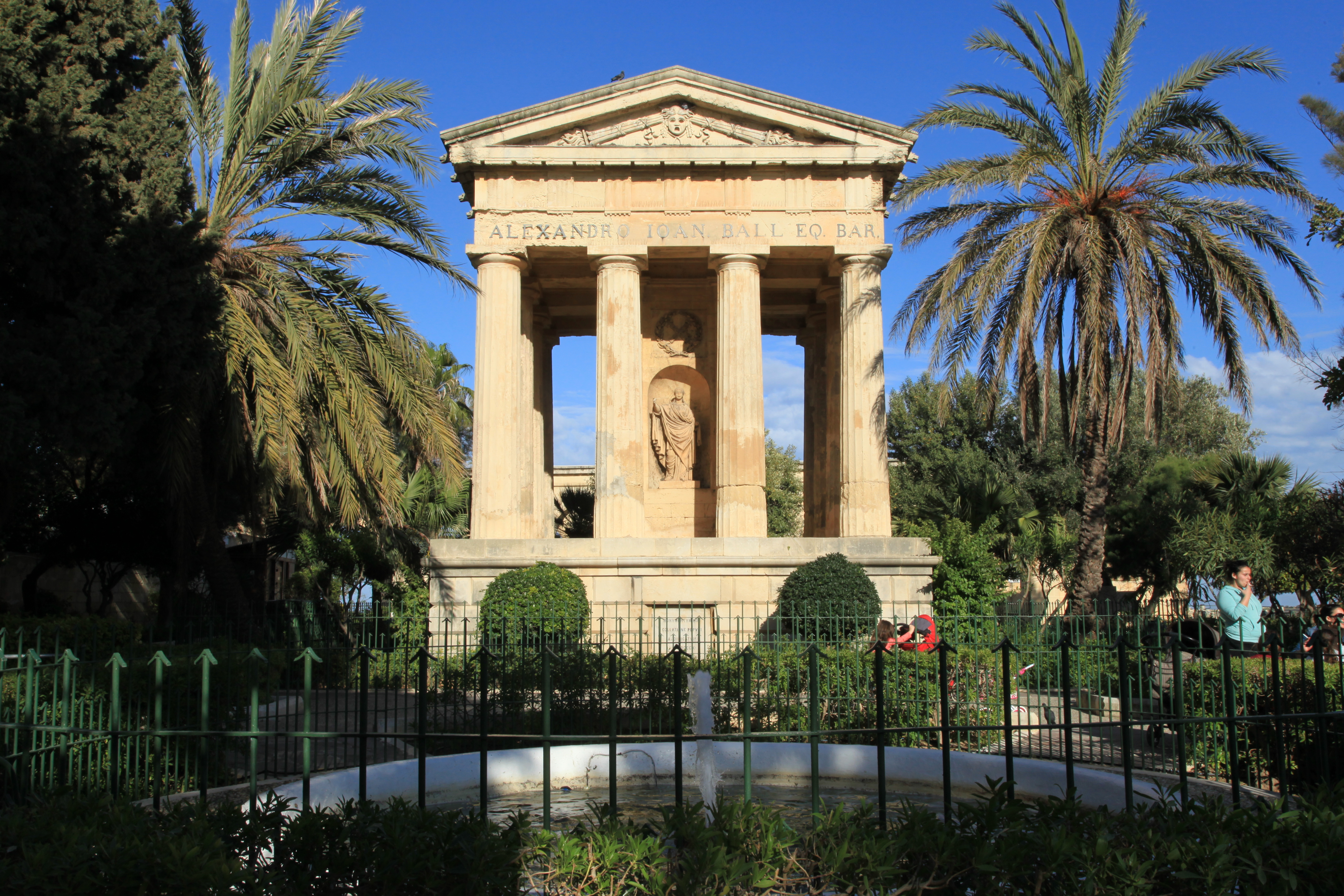
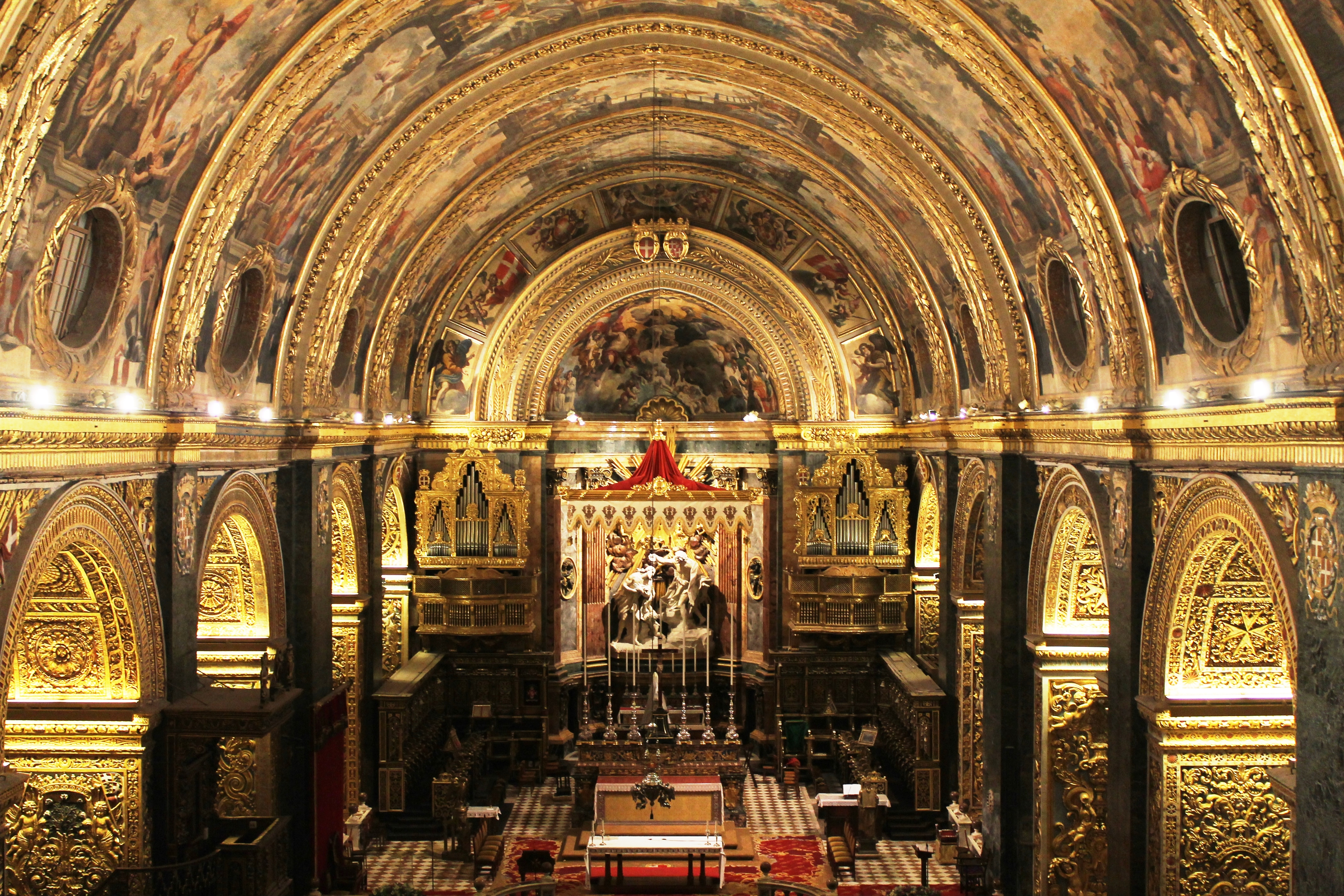
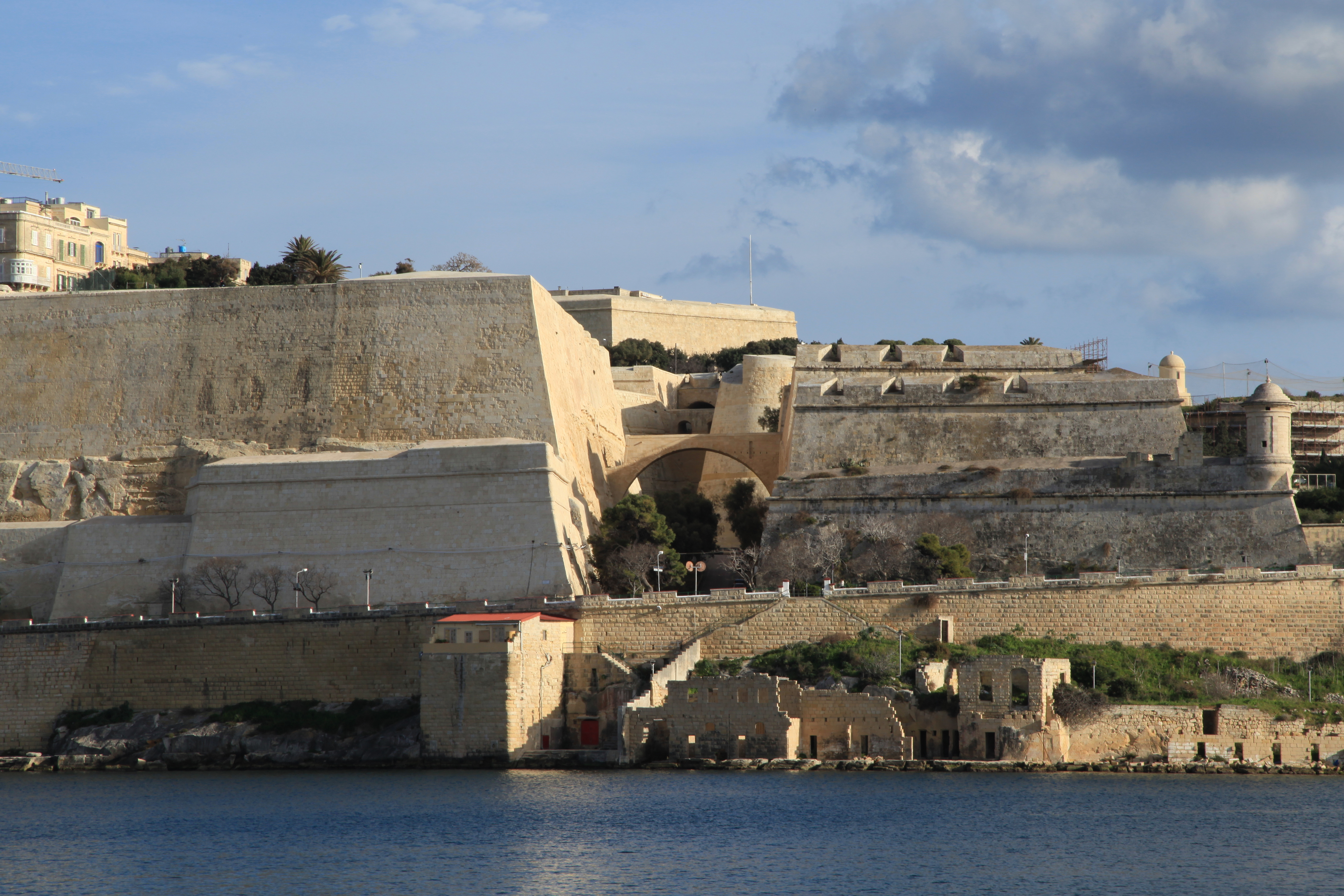
- Valletta skyline Saluting Battery Lower Barrakka Gardens St John's Co-Cathedral Fortifications of Valletta

- Flag Coat of arms
- Nickname: Il-Belt
- Motto: City Built By Gentlemen For Gentlemen
- Location within Malta Location within Europe
- Coordinates: 35°53′54″N 14°30′45″E
- Country: Malta
- Region: Port Region
- District: Southern Harbour District
- Established: 28 March 1566
- Capital city: 18 March 1571
- Founder: Jean de Parisot Valette
- Borders: Floriana

Government
  - Mayor: Olaf McKay (PL)

Area
  - Capital city and local council: 0.61 km^{2} (0.24 sq mi)
  - Urban: 256 km^{2} (99 sq mi)
- Elevation: 56 m (184 ft)

Population (Jul. 2024)
  - Capital city and local council: 5,226
  - Density: 8,600/km^{2} (22,000/sq mi)
  - Urban: 480,134
- Demonym(s): Belti (m), Beltija (f), Beltin (pl)
- Time zone: UTC+1 (CET)
  - Summer (DST): UTC+2 (CEST)
- Postal code: VLT
- Dialing code: 356
- ISO 3166 code: MT-60
- Patron saints: St. Paul, the Apostle; St. Dominic; Our Lady of Mount Carmel; St. Augustine
- Day of festa: 3 August; 10 February
- Website: Official website

UNESCO World Heritage Site
- Official name: City of Valletta
- Criteria: Cultural: i, vi
- Reference: 131
- Inscription: 1980 (4th Session)
- Area: 55.5 ha (137 acres)

Valletta (/vəˈlɛtə/; Maltese: il-Belt Valletta, lit. 'the city [of] Valletta', pronounced [ɪlˈbɛlt vɐˈlːɛtːɐ]), also known as Città Umilissima (transl. the Humblest City), is the capital city of Malta and one of its 68 council areas. Located between the Grand Harbour to the east and Marsamxett Harbour to the west, its population as of 2021 was 5,157. As Malta's capital city, it is a commercial centre for shopping, bars, dining, and café life. It is also the southernmost capital of Europe, (Note: Nicosia in Cyprus is further south than Valletta, however Cyprus is geographically part of Asia, although occasionally considered a European country in political and cultural geography. The United Nations geoscheme includes Cyprus in West Asia.) and, at just 0.61 square kilometres (0.24 sq mi), it is the European Union's smallest capital city.

Valletta's 16th-century buildings were constructed by the Knights Hospitaller. The city was named after the Frenchman Jean Parisot de Valette, who succeeded in defending the island against an Ottoman invasion during the Great Siege of Malta. The city is Baroque in character, with elements of Mannerist, Neo-Classical, and Modern architecture, though the Second World War left major scars on the city, particularly the destruction of the Royal Opera House. The city was officially recognised as a World Heritage Site by UNESCO in 1980. The city has 320 monuments, all within an area of 0.55 square kilometres (0.21 sq mi), making it one of the most concentrated historic areas in the world. Sometimes called an "open-air museum", Valletta was chosen as the European Capital of Culture for 2018. Valletta was also listed as the sunniest city in Europe in 2016.

The city is noted for its fortifications, consisting of bastions, curtains and cavaliers, along with the beauty of its Baroque palaces, gardens and churches.

== Demographics ==
The population of Valletta was 5,226 in July 2024. This included 2,675 males and 2,551 females; 4,400 Maltese nationals and 826 foreign nationals.

== History ==
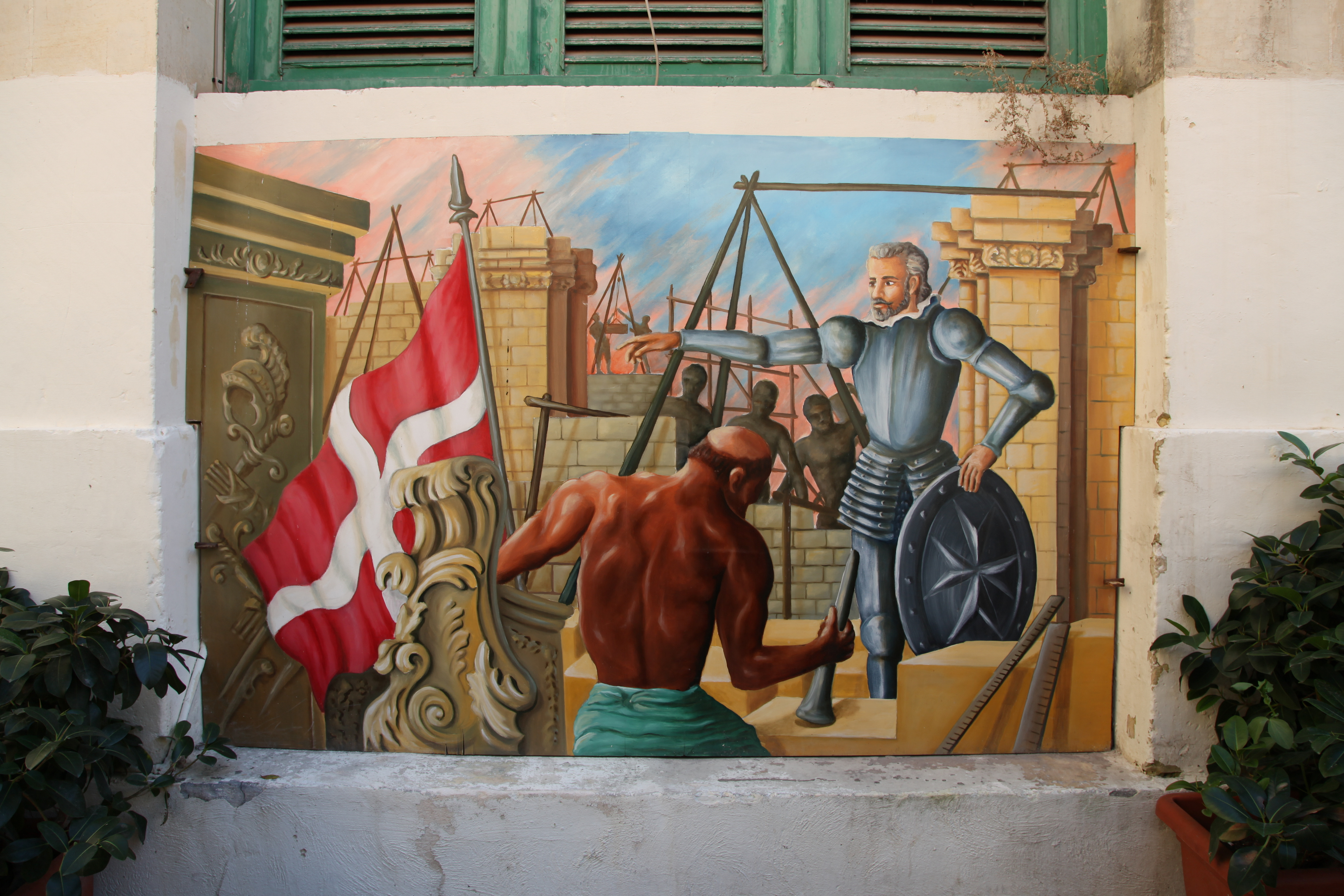
Former mural at Is-Suq tal-Belt illustrating the city's construction

The peninsula was previously called Xagħret Mewwija (Mu' awiya – Meuia; named during the Arab period) or Ħal Newwija. Mewwija refers to a sheltered place. Some authors state that the extreme end of the peninsula was known as Xebb ir-Ras (Sheb point), of which name origins from the lighthouse on site. A family which surely owned land became known as Sceberras, now a Maltese surname as Sciberras. At one point the entire peninsula became known as Sceberras.

Historical affiliations

(Order of Knights of the Hospital of Saint John of Jerusalem) Hospitaller Malta 1566–1798
(France) French Republic 1798–1800
(United Kingdom) Protectorate of Malta 1800–1813
Crown Colony of Malta 1813–1964
State of Malta 1964–1974
Republic of Malta 1974–present

Recent scholarly studies have however shown that the Xeberras phrase is of Punic origin and means 'the headland' and 'the middle peninsula' as it actually is.

=== Order of Saint John ===
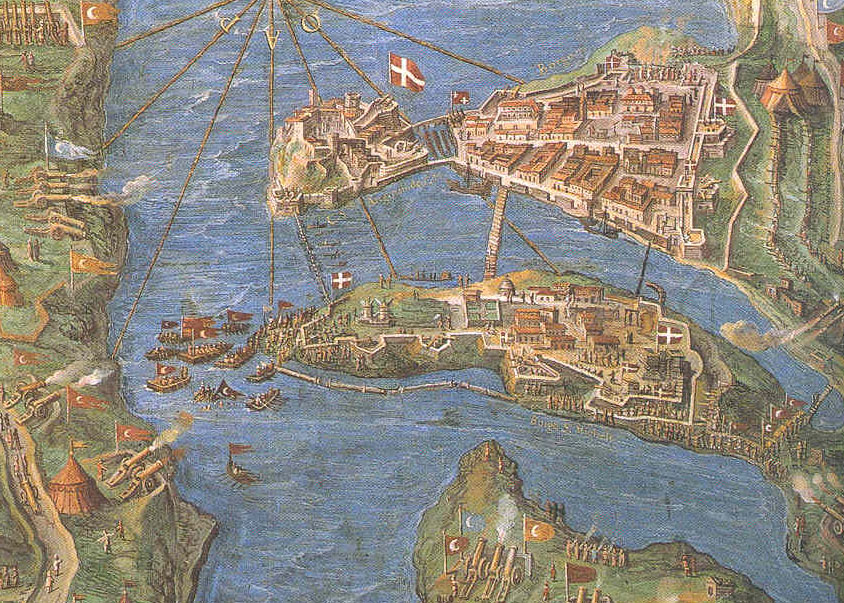
The Ottoman army bombs the Knights' Three Cities from the peninsula of Sciberras during the 1565 Great Siege.

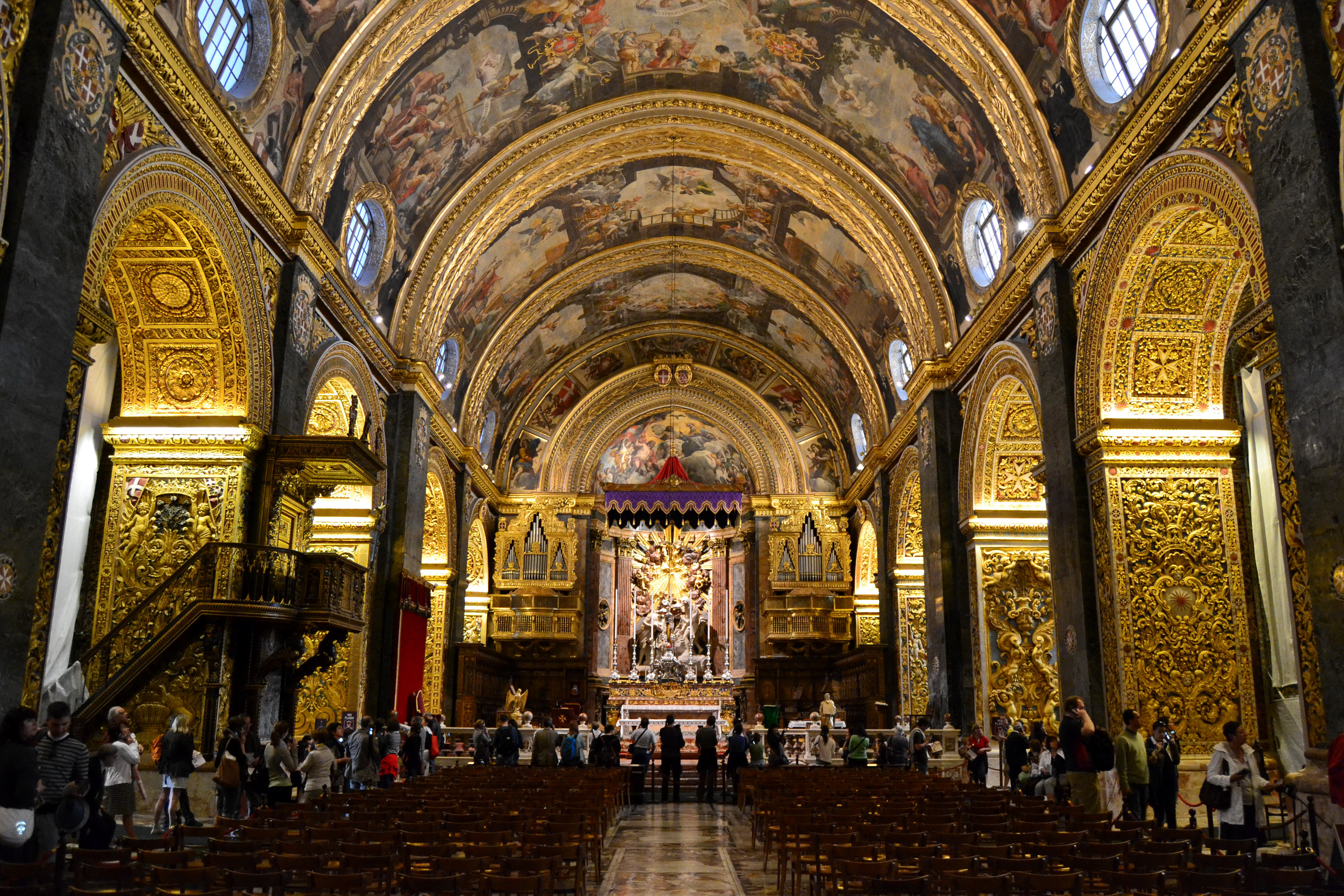
The nave of St John's Co-Cathedral

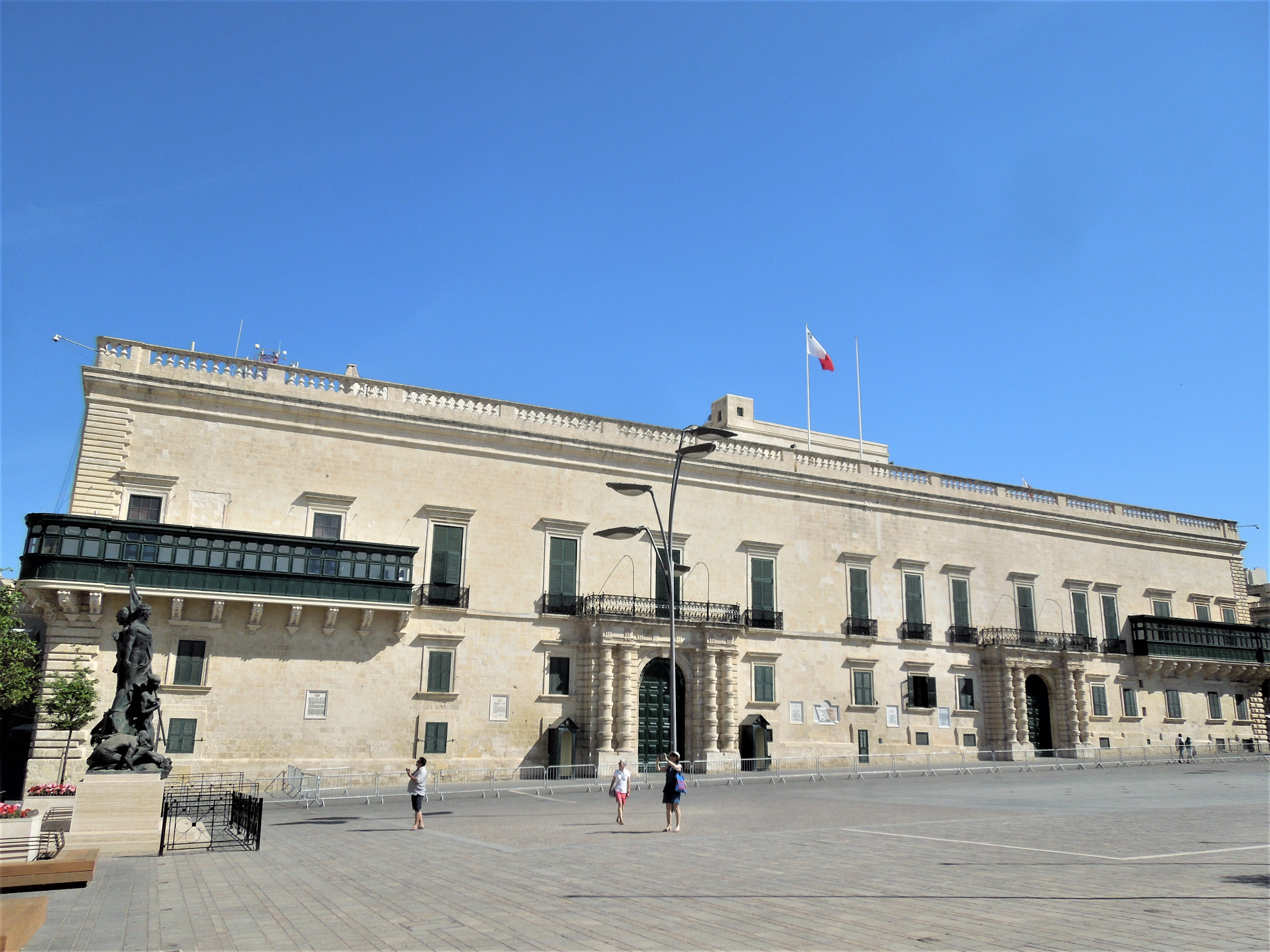
Grandmaster's Palace

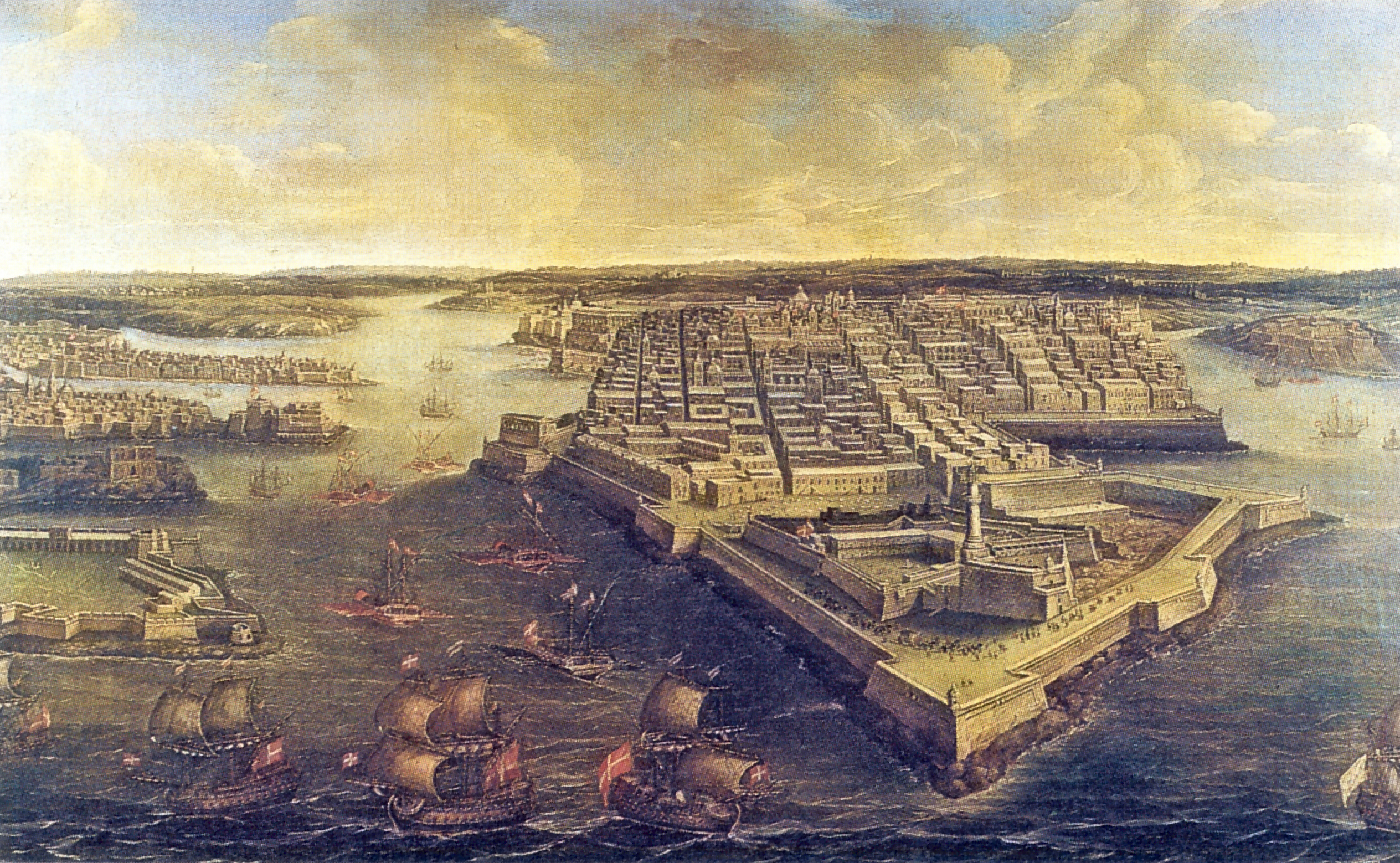
Valletta and the Grand Harbour c. 1801

The building of a city on the Sciberras Peninsula had been proposed by the Order of Saint John as early as 1524. Back then, the only building on the peninsula was a small watchtower dedicated to Erasmus of Formia (Saint Elmo), which had been built in 1488.

In 1552, the Aragonese watchtower was demolished and the larger Fort Saint Elmo was built in its place.

In the Great Siege of 1565, Fort Saint Elmo fell to the Ottomans, but the Order eventually won the siege with the help of Sicilian reinforcements. The victorious Grand Master, Jean de Valette, immediately set out to build a new fortified city on the Sciberras Peninsula to fortify the Order's position in Malta and bind the Knights to the island. The city took his name and was called La Valletta.

The Grand Master asked the European kings and princes for help, receiving a lot of assistance because of the increased fame of the Order after its victory in the Great Siege. Pope Pius V sent his military architect, Francesco Laparelli, to design the new city, while Philip II of Spain sent substantial monetary aid. The foundation stone of the city was laid by Grand Master de Valette on 28 March 1566. He placed the first stone in what later became Our Lady of Victories Church.

In his book Dell'Istoria della Sacra Religione et Illustrissima Militia di San Giovanni Gierosolimitano (English: The History of the Sacred Religion and Illustrious Militia of St John of Jerusalem), written between 1594 and 1602, Giacomo Bosio writes that, when the cornerstone of Valletta was placed, a group of Maltese elders said: "Iegi zimen en fel wardia col sceber raba iesue uquie" (Which in modern Maltese reads, "Jiġi żmien li fil-Wardija [l-Għolja Sciberras] kull xiber raba' jiswa uqija", and in English, "There will come a time when every piece of land on Sciberras Hill will be worth its weight in gold").

De Valette died from a stroke on 21 August 1568 at age 74 and never saw the completion of his city. Originally interred in the church of Our Lady of the Victories, his remains now rest in St. John's Co-Cathedral among the tombs of other Grand Masters of the Knights of Malta.

Francesco Laparelli was the city's principal designer and his plan departed from medieval Maltese architecture, which exhibited irregular winding streets and alleys. He designed the new city on a rectangular grid plan, and without any collacchio (an area restricted for important buildings). The streets were designed to be wide and straight, beginning centrally from the City Gate and ending at Fort Saint Elmo (which was rebuilt) overlooking the Mediterranean; certain bastions were built 47 metres (154 ft) high. His assistant was the Maltese architect Girolamo Cassar, who later oversaw the construction of the city himself after Laparelli's death in 1570.

The Ufficio delle Case regulated the building of the city as a planning authority.

The city of Valletta was mostly completed by the early 1570s, and it became the capital on 18 March 1571 when Grand Master Pierre de Monte moved from his seat at Fort St Angelo in Birgu to the Grandmaster's Palace in Valletta.

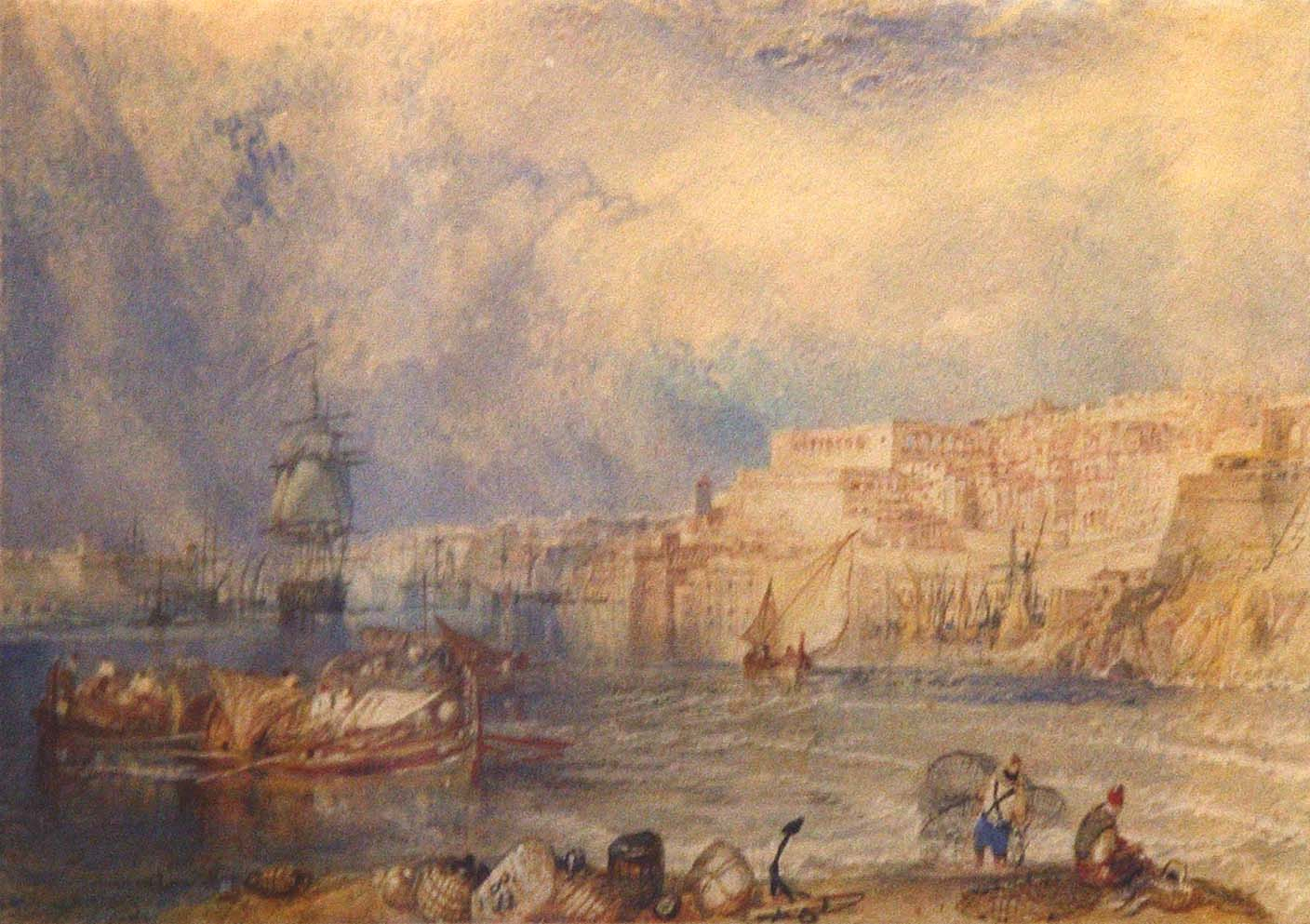
Turner's depiction of the Grand Harbour, National Museum of Fine Arts

Seven Auberges were built for the Order's Langues, and these were complete by the 1580s. An eighth Auberge, Auberge de Bavière, was later added in the 18th century.

In Antoine de Paule's reign, it was decided to build more fortifications to protect Valletta, and these were named the Floriana Lines after the architect who designed them, Pietro Paolo Floriani of Macerata. During António Manoel de Vilhena's reign, a town began to form between the walls of Valletta and the Floriana Lines, and this evolved from a suburb of Valletta to Floriana, a town in its own right.

In 1634, a gunpowder factory explosion killed 22 people in Valletta. In 1749, Muslim slaves plotted to kill Grandmaster Pinto and take over Valletta, but the revolt was suppressed before it even started because their plans leaked out to the Order. Later in his reign, Pinto embellished the city with Baroque architecture, and many important buildings such as Auberge de Castille were remodelled or completely rebuilt in the new architectural style.

In 1775, during the reign of Ximenes, an unsuccessful revolt known as the Rising of the Priests occurred in which Fort Saint Elmo and Saint James Cavalier were captured by rebels, but the revolt was eventually suppressed.

=== French occupation and British rule ===
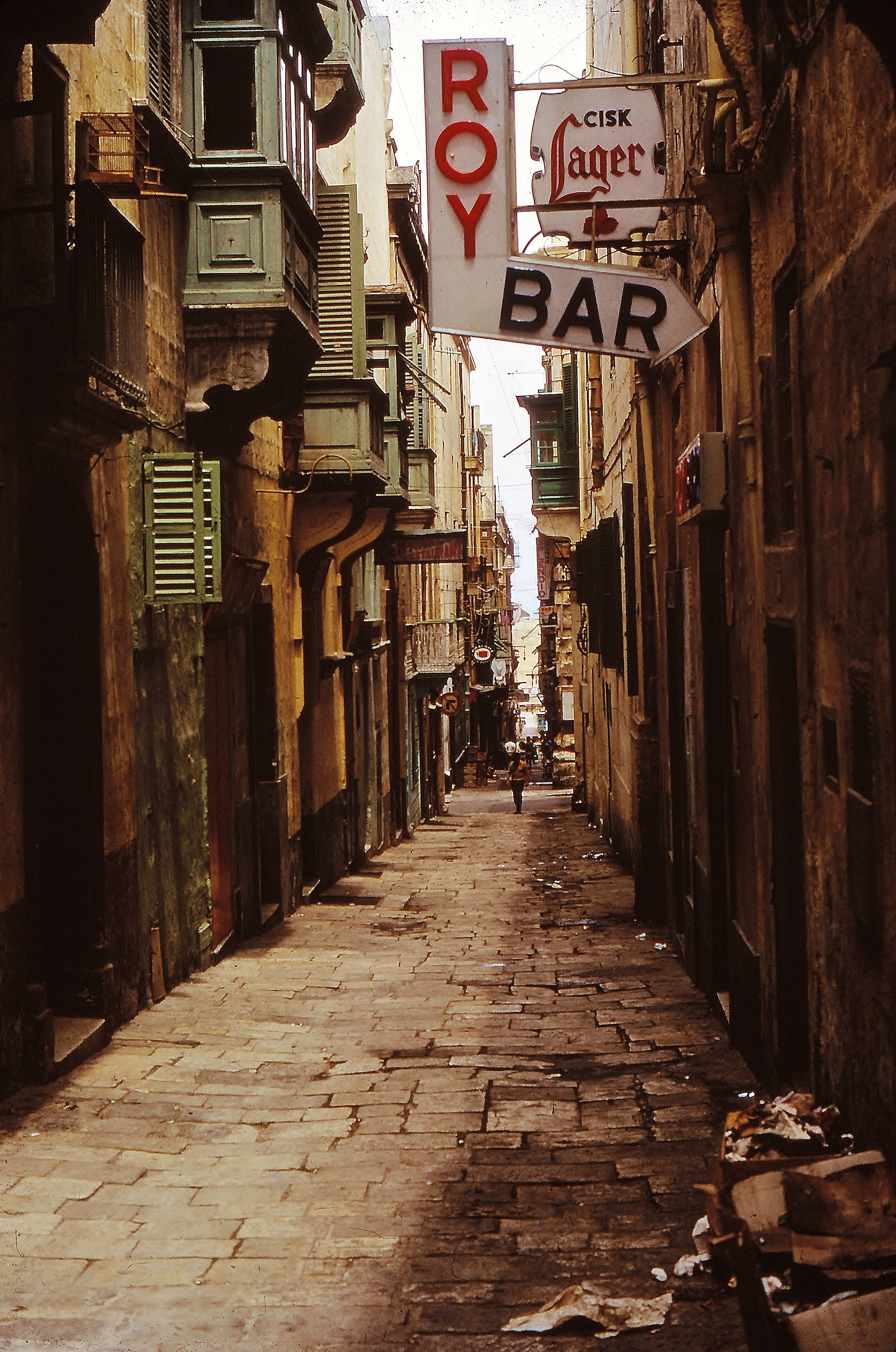
Early morning in 1967 on the notorious Strait Street known to generations of British servicemen (especially to sailors on shore leave) as "The Gut". Bars and bordellos abounded, and brawls were common, but its popularity never waned.

In 1798, the French invaded the island and expelled the Order. After the Maltese rebelled, French troops continued to occupy Valletta and the surrounding harbour area, until they capitulated to the British in September 1800. In the early 19th century, the British Civil Commissioner, Henry Pigot, agreed to demolish the majority of the city's fortifications. The demolition was again proposed in the 1870s and 1880s, but it was never carried out and the fortifications have survived largely intact.

Eventually, building projects in Valletta resumed under British rule. These projects included widening gates, demolishing and rebuilding structures, widening newer houses over the years, and installing civic projects. The Malta Railway, which linked Valletta to Mdina, was officially opened in 1883. It was closed down in 1931 after buses became a popular means of transport.

In 1939, Valletta was abandoned as the headquarters of the Royal Navy Mediterranean Fleet due to its proximity to Italy, and the city became a flash point during the subsequent two-year long Siege of Malta. German and Italian air raids throughout the Second World War caused much destruction in Valletta and the rest of the harbour area. The Royal Opera House, constructed at the city entrance in the 19th century, was one of the buildings lost to the raids.

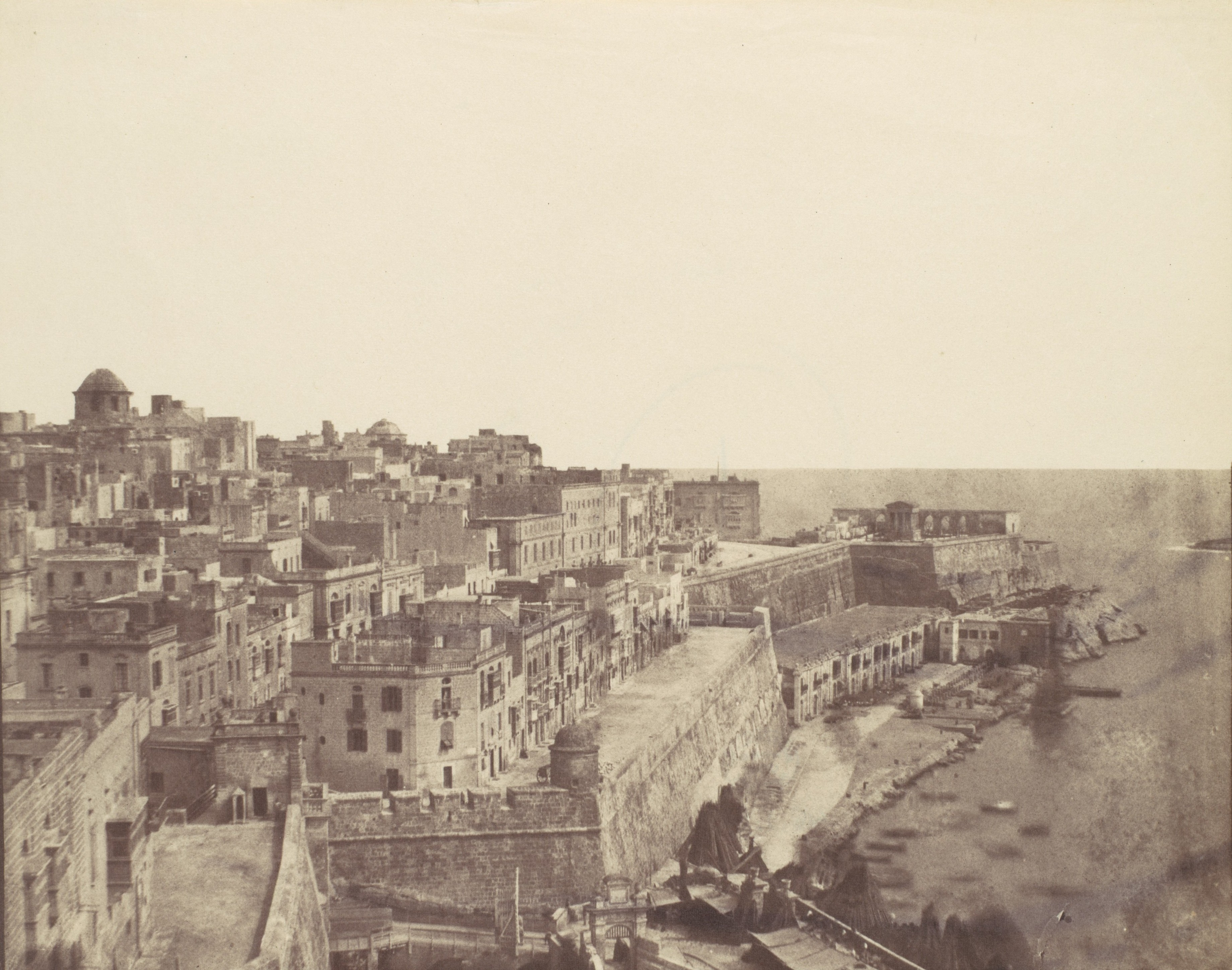
Valletta harbour c. 1850, photo by Calvert Jones

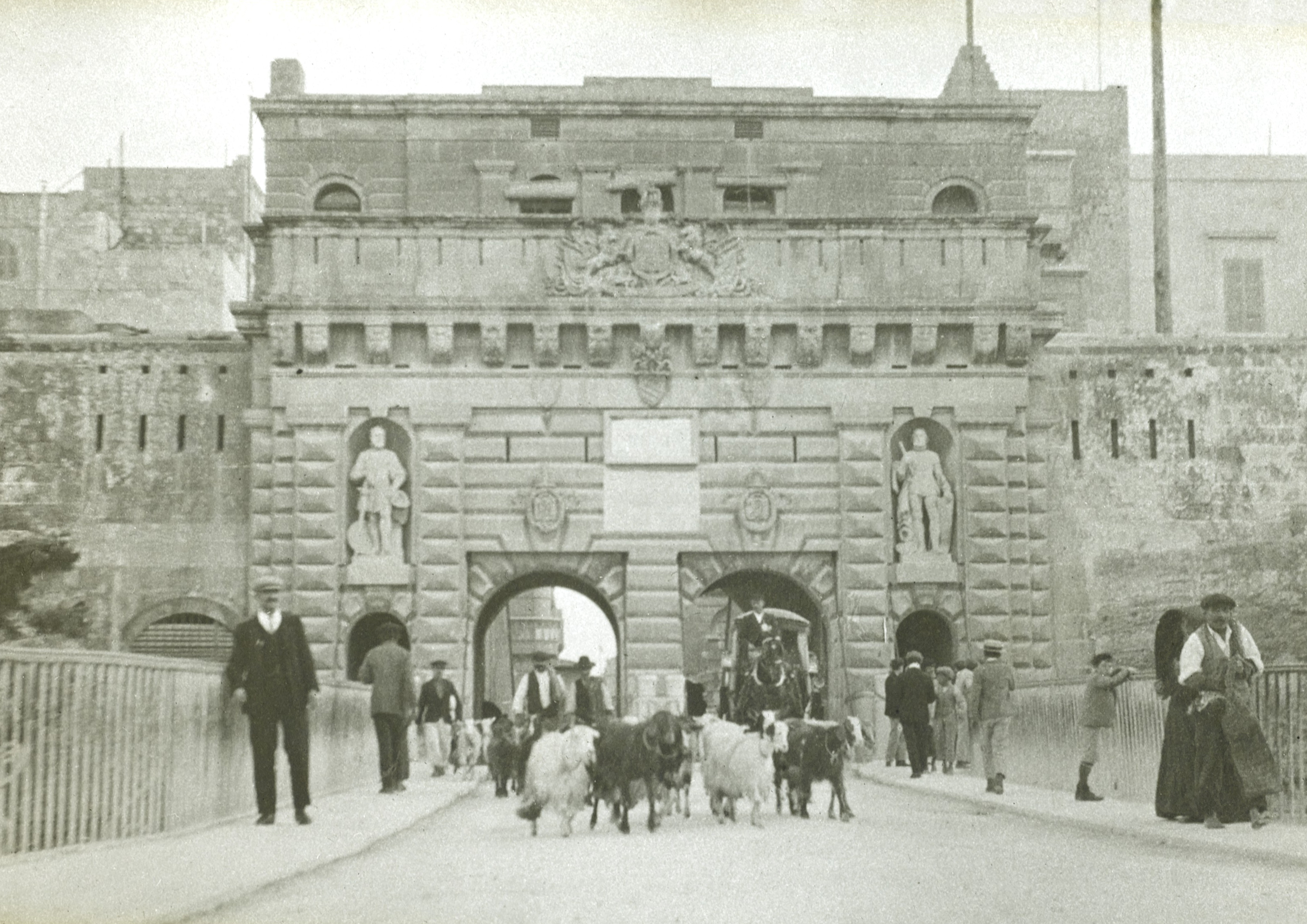
King's Gate c. 1884–1905

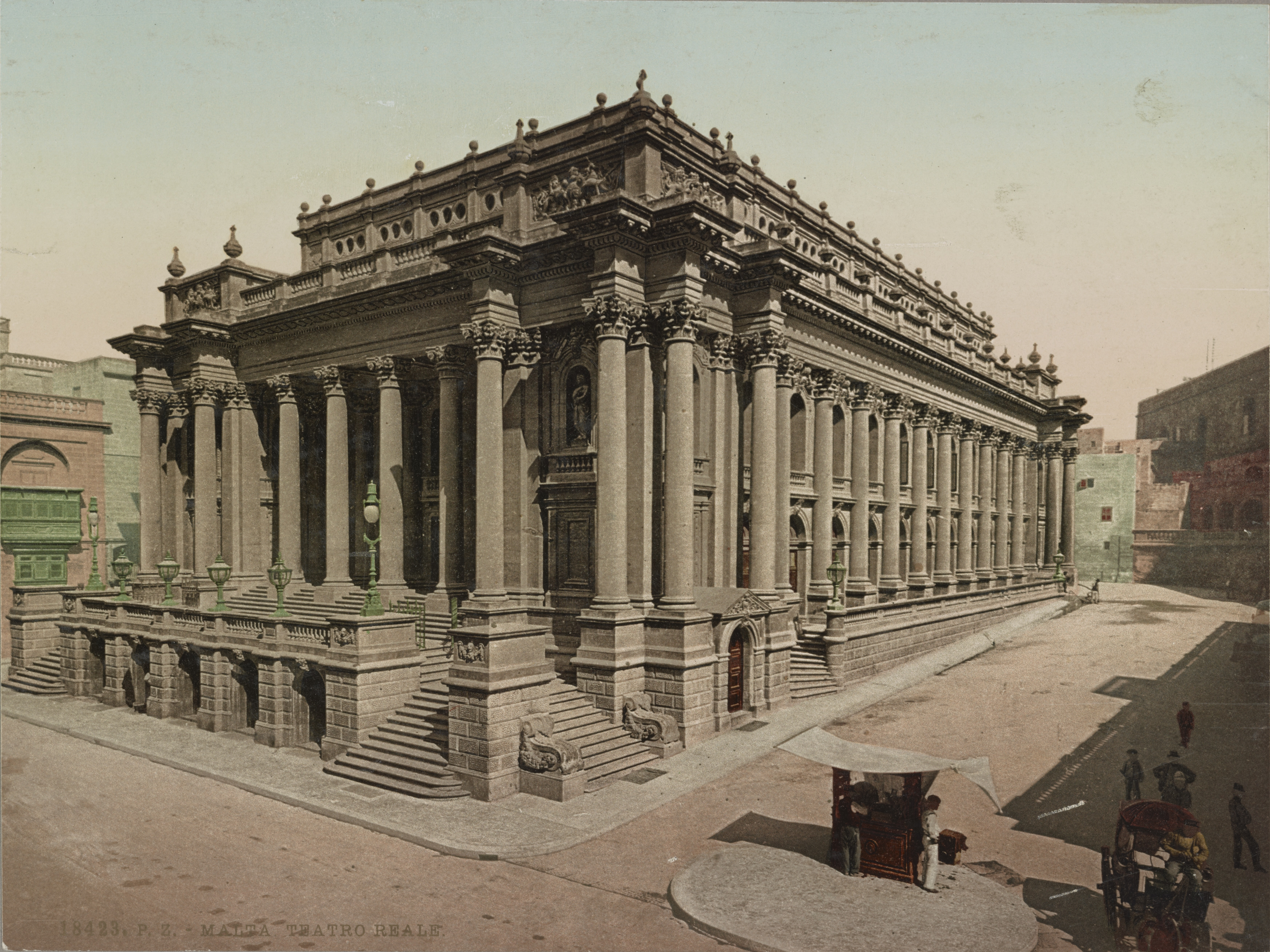
Royal Opera House in 1911

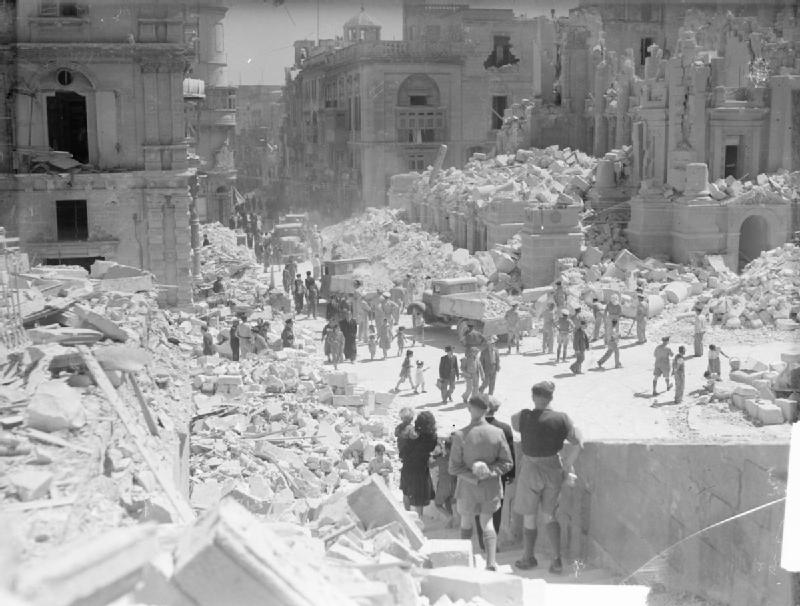
Bomb damage in Valletta during the Second World War

=== Contemporary ===
In 1980, the 24th Chess Olympiad took place in Valletta.

The entire city of Valletta has been a UNESCO World Heritage Site since 1980, along with Megalithic Temples of Malta and the Hypogeum of Ħal-Saflieni. On 11 November 2015, Valletta hosted the Valletta Summit on Migration, in which European and African leaders discussed the European migrant crisis. After that, on 27 November 2015, the city also hosted part of the Commonwealth Heads of Government Meeting 2015.

Valletta was the European Capital of Culture in 2018.

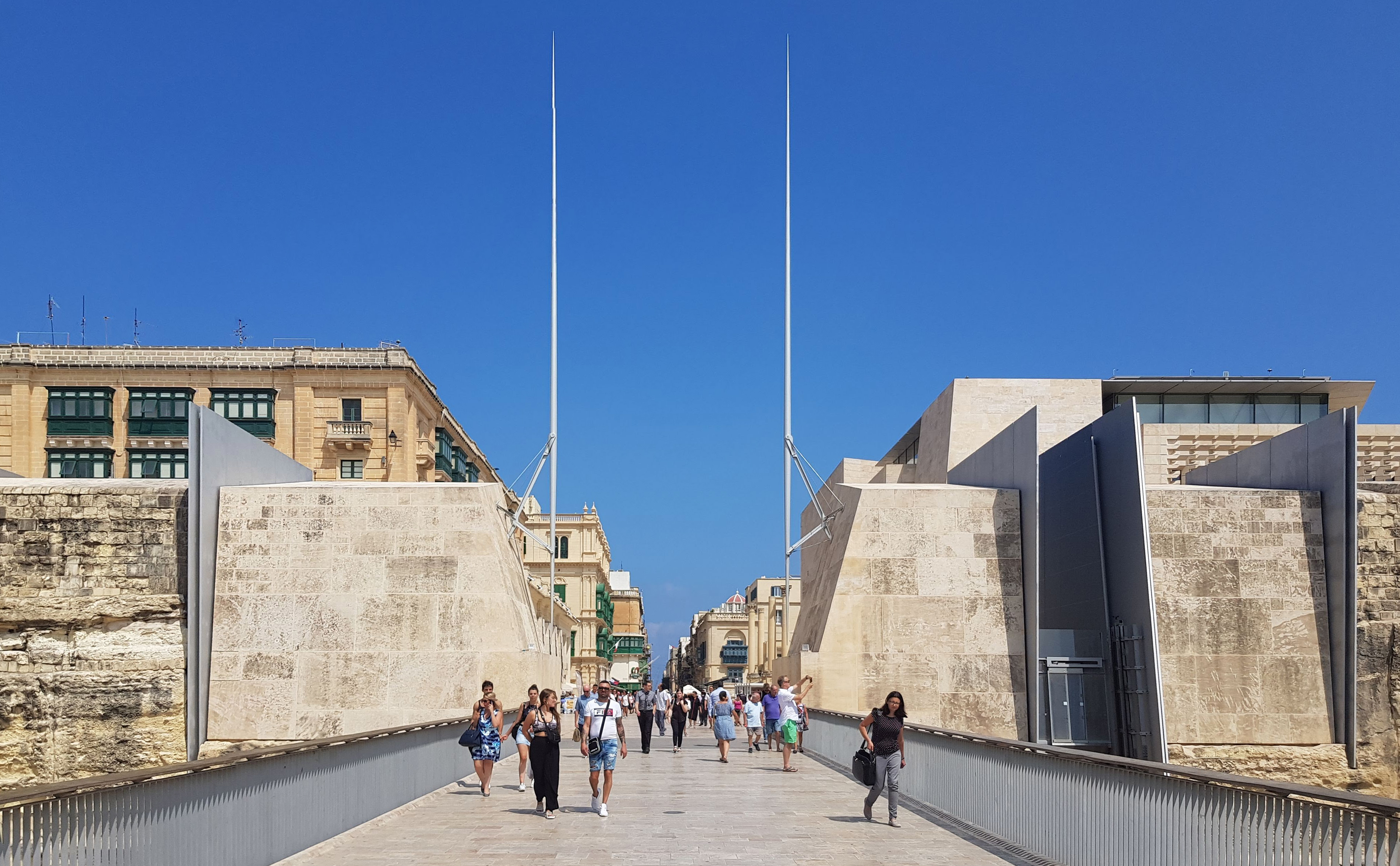
Renzo Piano's Valletta City Gate (2014)

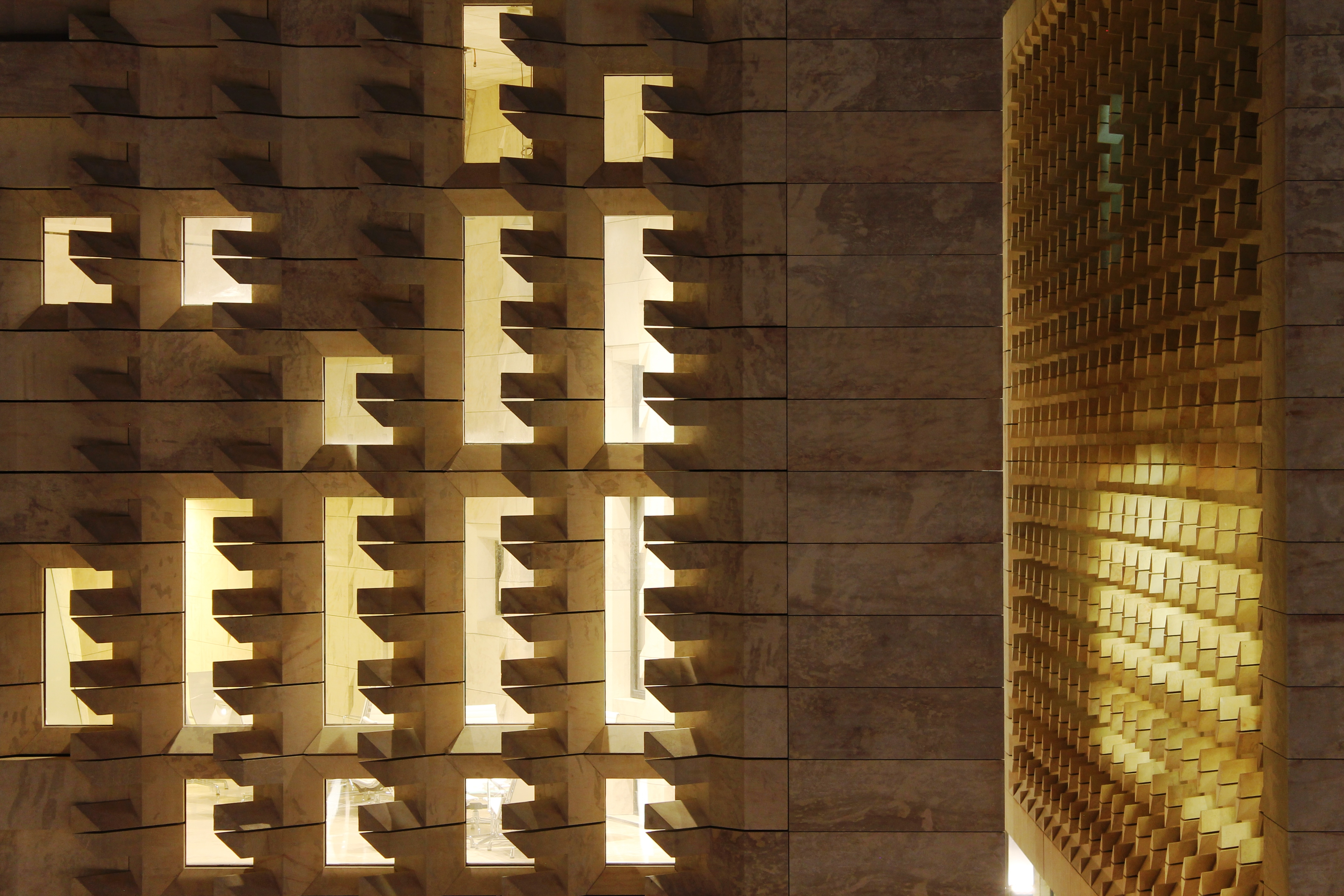
Detail of the Parliament House (2015)

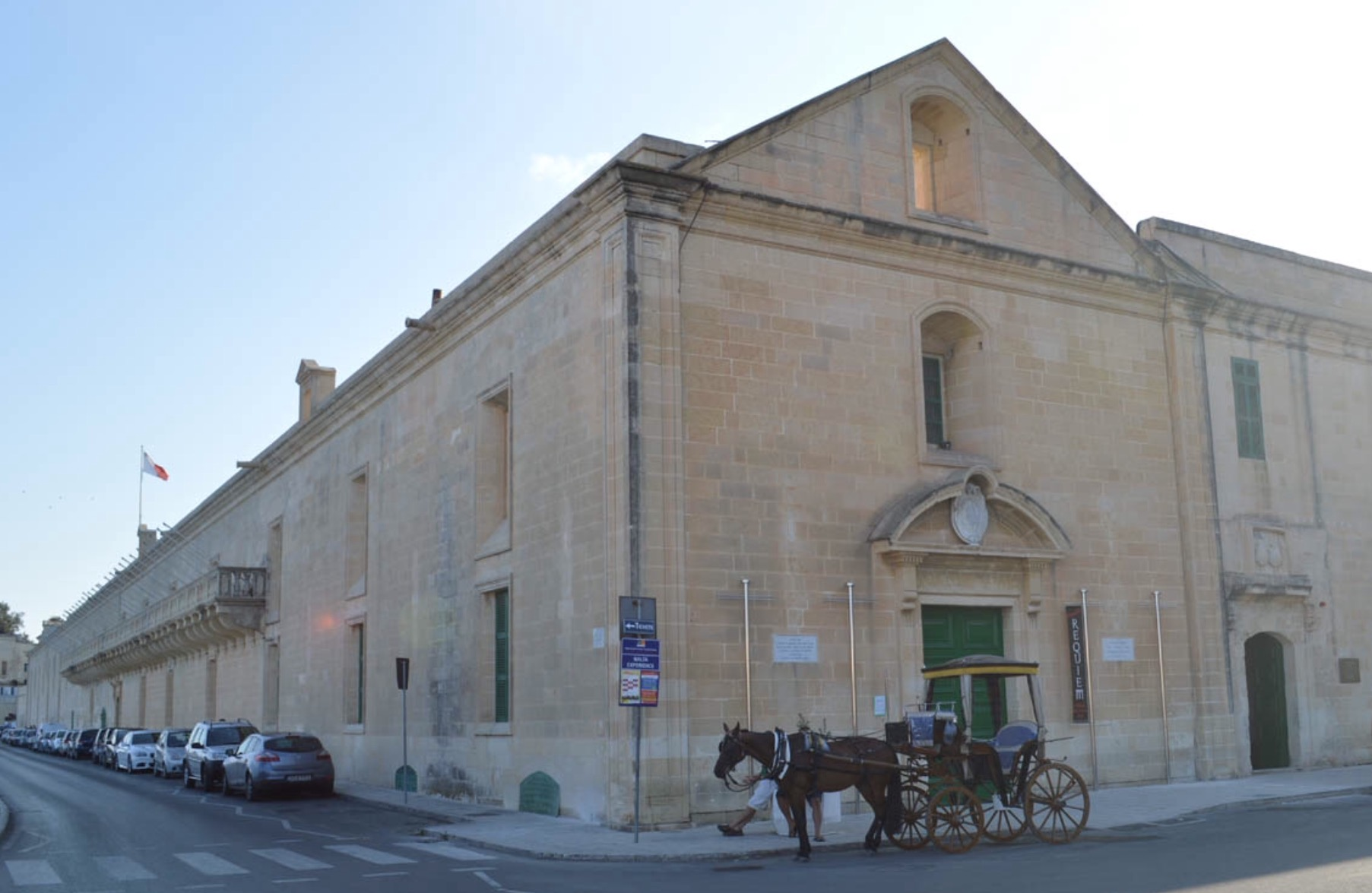
Mediterranean Conference Centre, former Sacra Infermeria (2016)

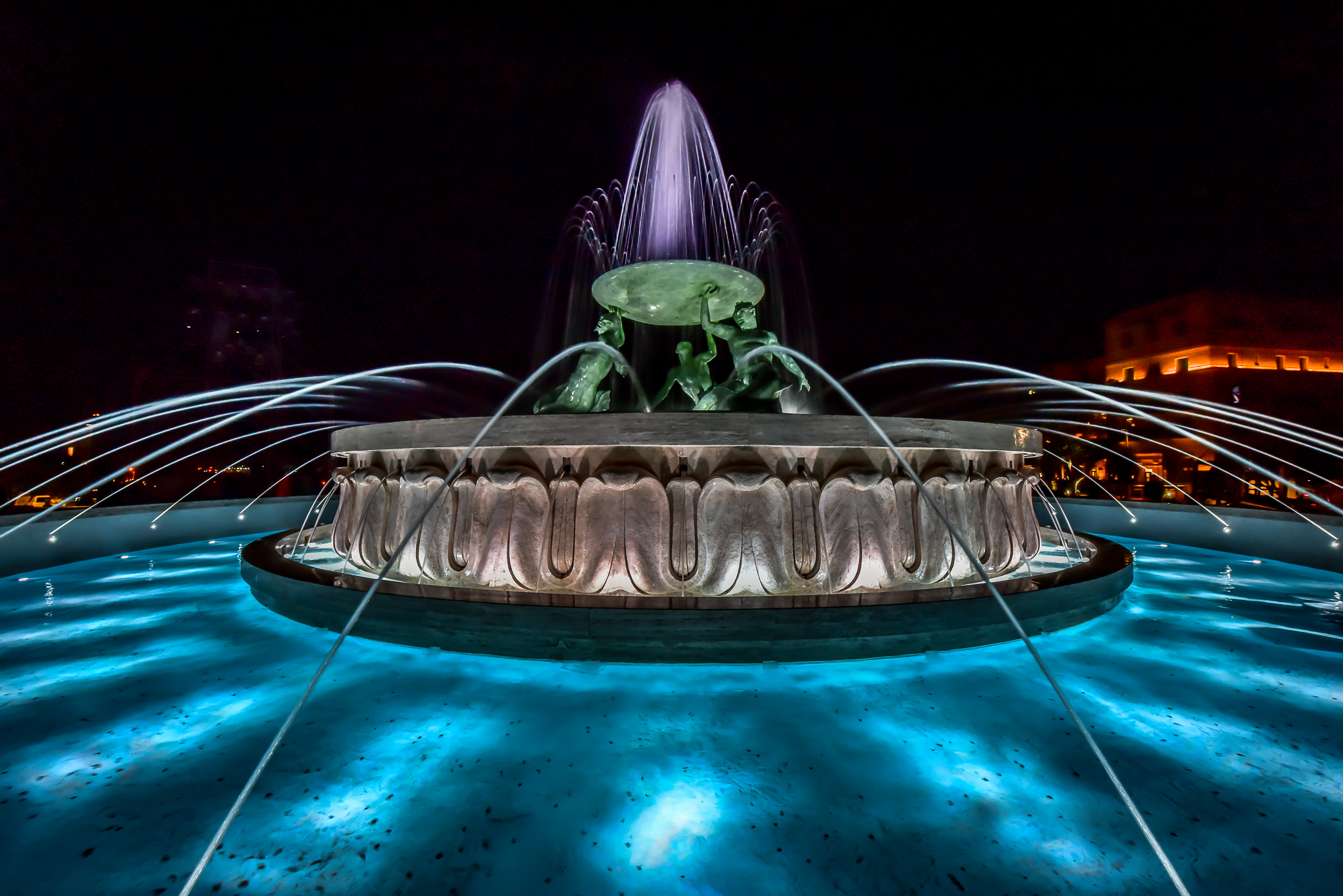
Renovated Tritons' Fountain (2018)

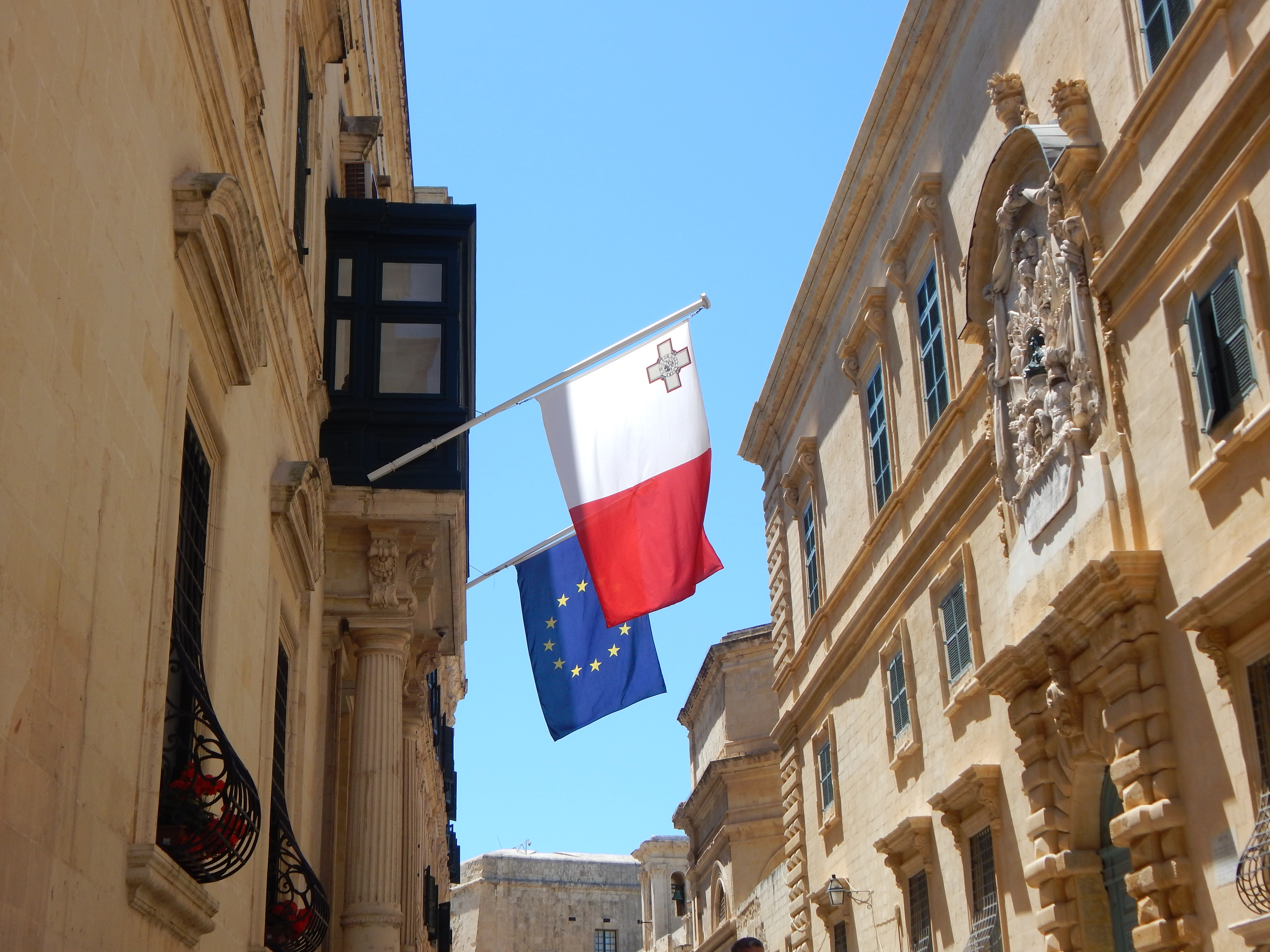
Auberge d'Italie, renovated in 2016 to host the new MUŻA (Mużew Nazzjonali tal-Arti)

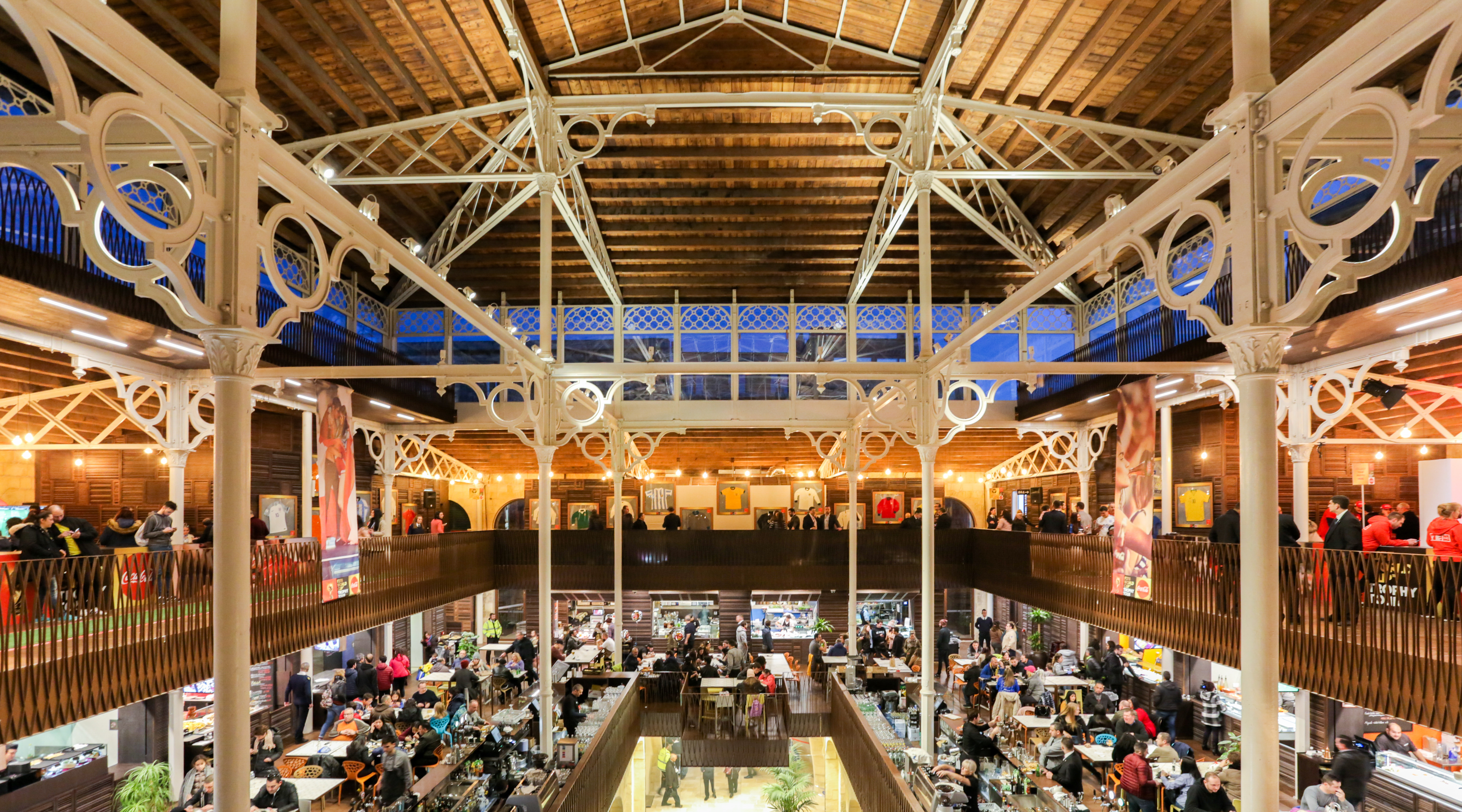
Renovated covered market Is-Suq tal-Belt, 2018

== Government ==
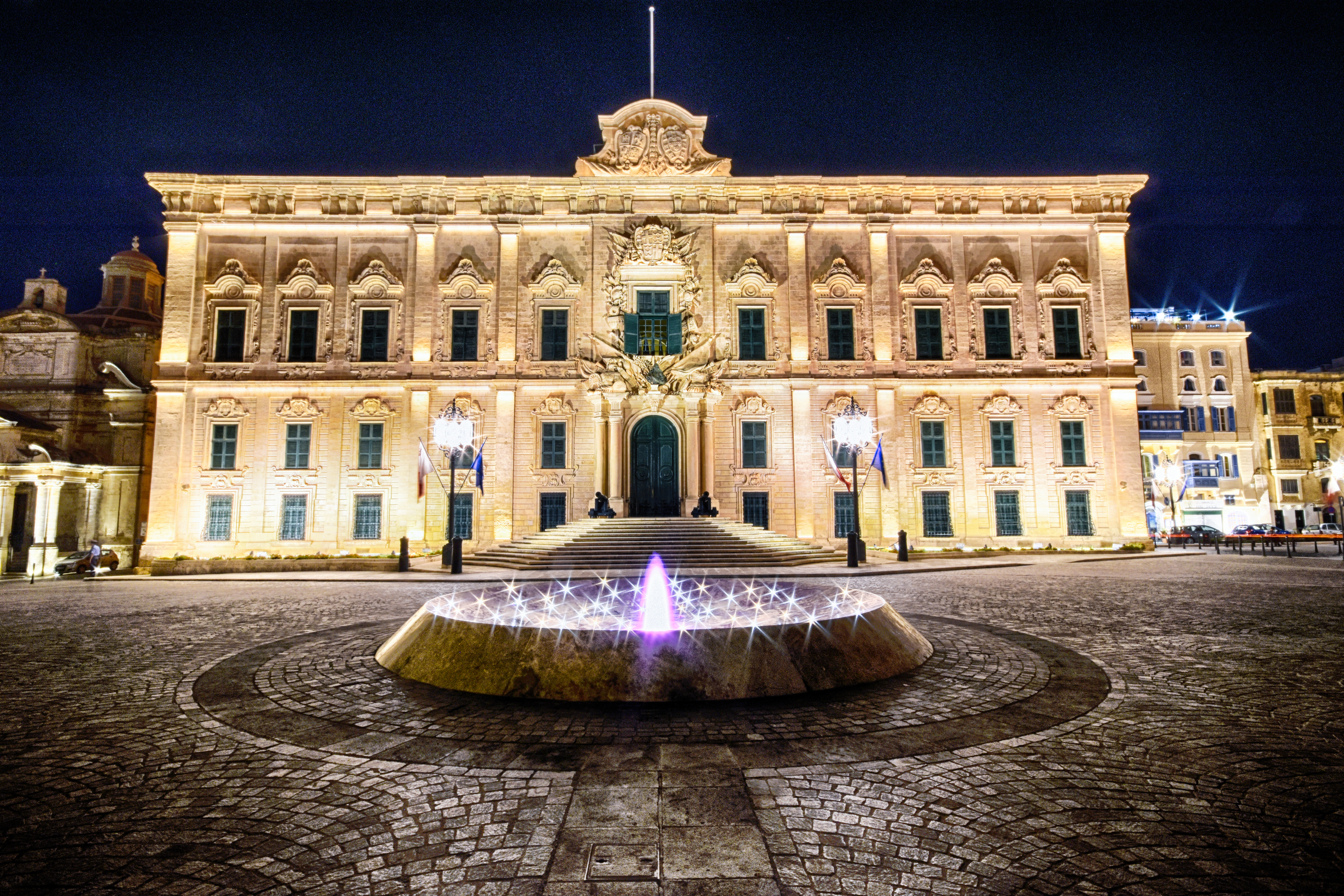
Auberge de Castille at night

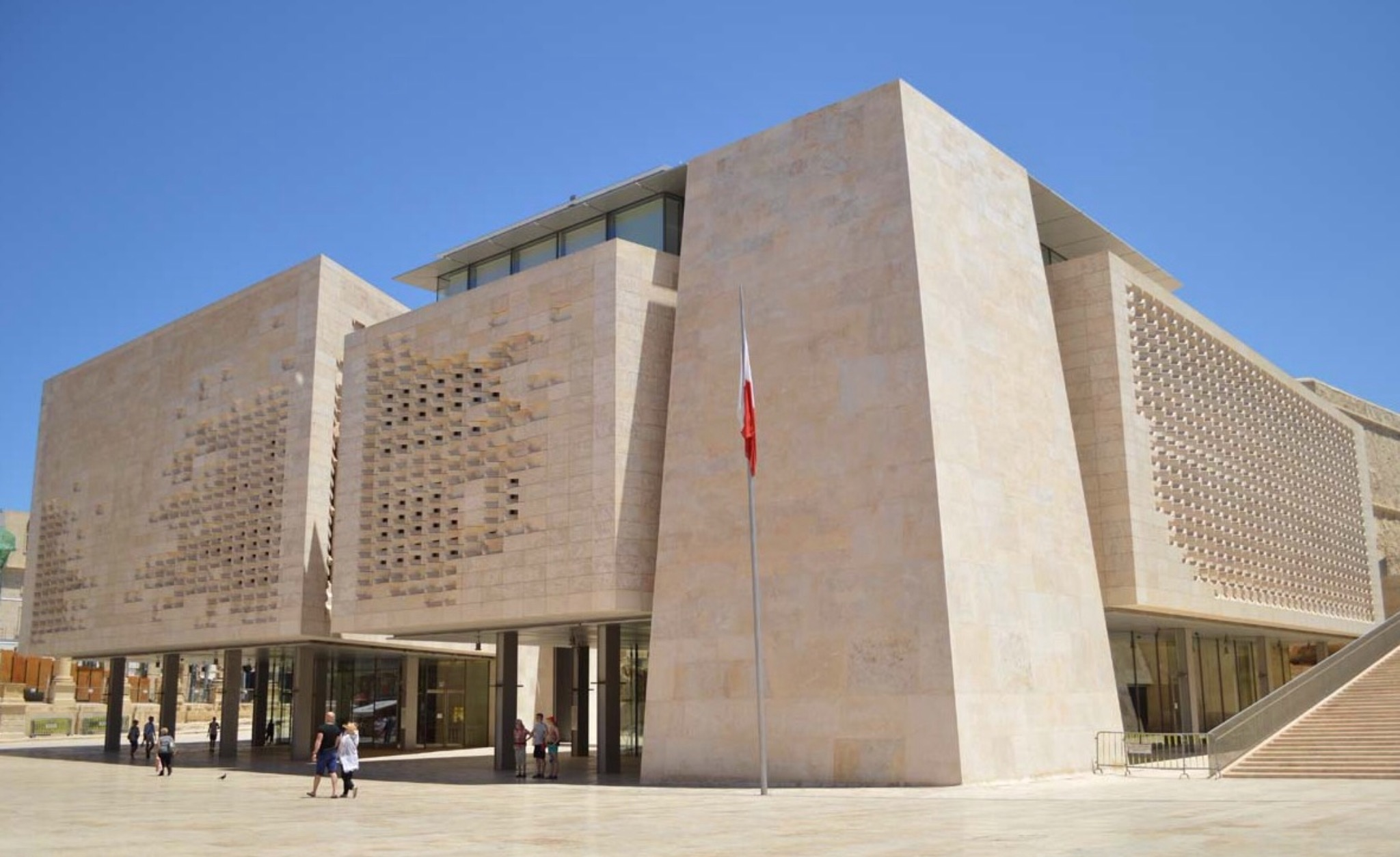
Renzo Piano's Parliament House

=== Local government ===
The City of Valletta, Malta's Capital, was founded in 1566 by Grand Master of the Knights of St. John. During the period of the Knights of Malta, Valletta had its own Municipal Administrative Council, the Università, administered out of what was known the Municipio or the Banca Giuratale. The Administration attracted notable Maltese personalities. The Universitas of Valletta ran from 1577 to 1818 when the British Colonial Governor, Thomas Maithland suppressed it, taking full control of all administrative affairs of Malta. 175 year later, local administration was re-established in Malta.

The Valletta Local Council was established by the Local Councils Act of 1993, along with the other local councils of Malta. The first election was held on 20 November 1993. Other elections were held in 1996, 1999, 2002, 2005, 2008, 2013, 2017. The present local council was elected in 2019. The local council is housed in a building in South Street.

The following people have served as mayors of Valletta:

- Hector Bruno (1993–1999) (PN)
- Paul Borg Olivier (1999–2008) (PN)
- Alexiei Dingli (2008–2019) (PN)
- Christian Micallef (2019) (PN)
- Alfred Zammit (2019–2024) (PL)
- Olaf McKay (2024–) (PL)

=== National government ===
Valletta is the capital city of Malta, and is the country's administrative and commercial hub. The Parliament of Malta has been housed at the Parliament House near the city's entrance since 2015: it was previously housed at the Grandmaster's Palace in the city centre. The latter palace still houses the Office of the President of Malta, while the Auberge de Castille houses the Office of the Prime Minister of Malta. The courthouse and many government departments are also located in Valletta.

== Geography ==
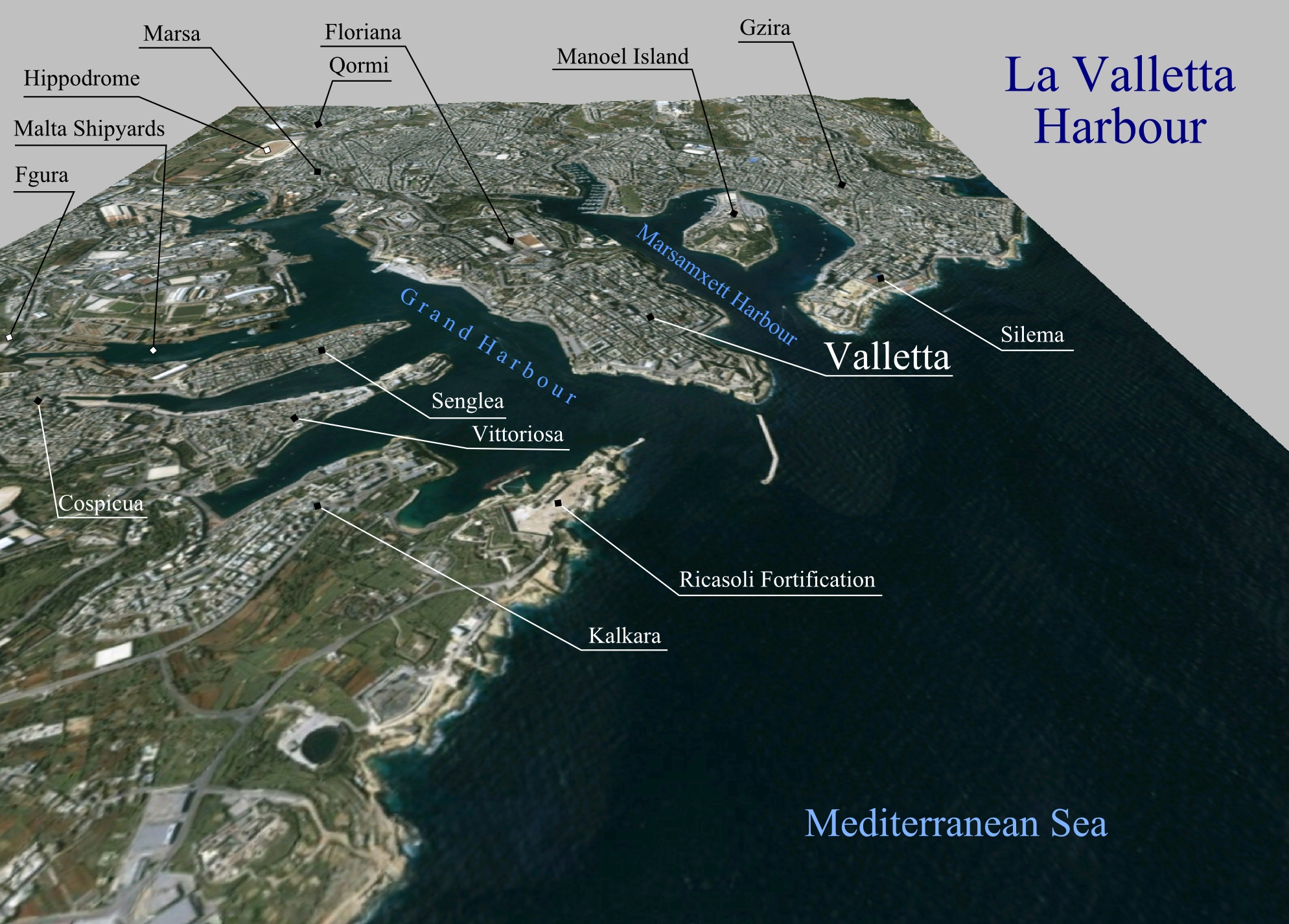
Valletta between its two harbours

The Valletta peninsula has two natural harbours, Marsamxett and the Grand Harbour. The Grand Harbour is Malta's major port, with unloading quays at nearby Marsa. A cruise-liner terminal is located along the old seawall of the Valletta Waterfront that Portuguese Grandmaster Manuel Pinto da Fonseca built.

=== Climate ===
Valletta features a hot-summer variant Mediterranean climate (Köppen Csa) with very mild, wet winters and long, hot, dry summers, with an average annual temperature above 23 °C (73 °F) during the day and 16 °C (61 °F) at night.

Valletta experiences a lack of precipitation during the summer months with most of the annual precipitation occurring during the winter months. Despite the summer dryness, humidity and dew points remain high because of the city's coastal location. Winter temperatures are moderated by the surrounding sea and as a result, the city has very mild winters and a long seasonal lag.

Air frosts and snowfall are essentially non-existent, with the last measurable snow falling during the winter of 1963.

The official climate recording station in Malta is at Luqa Airport, which is a few miles inland from Valletta. Average high temperatures range from around 16 °C (61 °F) in January to about 32 °C (90 °F) in August, while average low temperatures range from around 10 °C (50 °F) in January to 23 °C (73 °F) in August.

Climate data for Malta (Luqa Airport in the suburbs of Valletta, 1991–2020)
| Month | Jan | Feb | Mar | Apr | May | Jun | Jul | Aug | Sep | Oct | Nov | Dec | Year |
|---|---|---|---|---|---|---|---|---|---|---|---|---|---|
| Mean daily maximum °C (°F) | 15.7 (60.3) | 15.7 (60.3) | 17.4 (63.3) | 20.0 (68.0) | 24.2 (75.6) | 28.7 (83.7) | 31.7 (89.1) | 32.0 (89.6) | 28.6 (83.5) | 25.0 (77.0) | 20.8 (69.4) | 17.2 (63.0) | 23.1 (73.6) |
| Daily mean °C (°F) | 12.9 (55.2) | 12.6 (54.7) | 14.1 (57.4) | 16.4 (61.5) | 20.1 (68.2) | 24.2 (75.6) | 26.9 (80.4) | 27.5 (81.5) | 24.9 (76.8) | 21.8 (71.2) | 17.9 (64.2) | 14.5 (58.1) | 19.5 (67.1) |
| Mean daily minimum °C (°F) | 10.1 (50.2) | 9.5 (49.1) | 10.9 (51.6) | 12.8 (55.0) | 15.8 (60.4) | 19.6 (67.3) | 22.1 (71.8) | 23.0 (73.4) | 21.2 (70.2) | 18.4 (65.1) | 14.9 (58.8) | 11.8 (53.2) | 15.9 (60.6) |
| Average precipitation mm (inches) | 79.3 (3.12) | 73.2 (2.88) | 45.3 (1.78) | 20.7 (0.81) | 11.0 (0.43) | 6.2 (0.24) | 0.2 (0.01) | 17.0 (0.67) | 60.7 (2.39) | 81.8 (3.22) | 91.0 (3.58) | 93.7 (3.69) | 580.7 (22.86) |
| Average precipitation days (≥ 1.0 mm) | 10.0 | 8.2 | 6.1 | 3.8 | 1.5 | 0.8 | 0.0 | 1.0 | 4.3 | 6.6 | 8.7 | 10.0 | 61 |
| Mean monthly sunshine hours | 169.3 | 178.1 | 227.2 | 253.8 | 309.7 | 336.9 | 376.7 | 352.2 | 270.0 | 223.8 | 195.0 | 161.2 | 3,054 |
Source: Meteo Climate, MaltaWeather.com (sun data)

== Cityscape ==
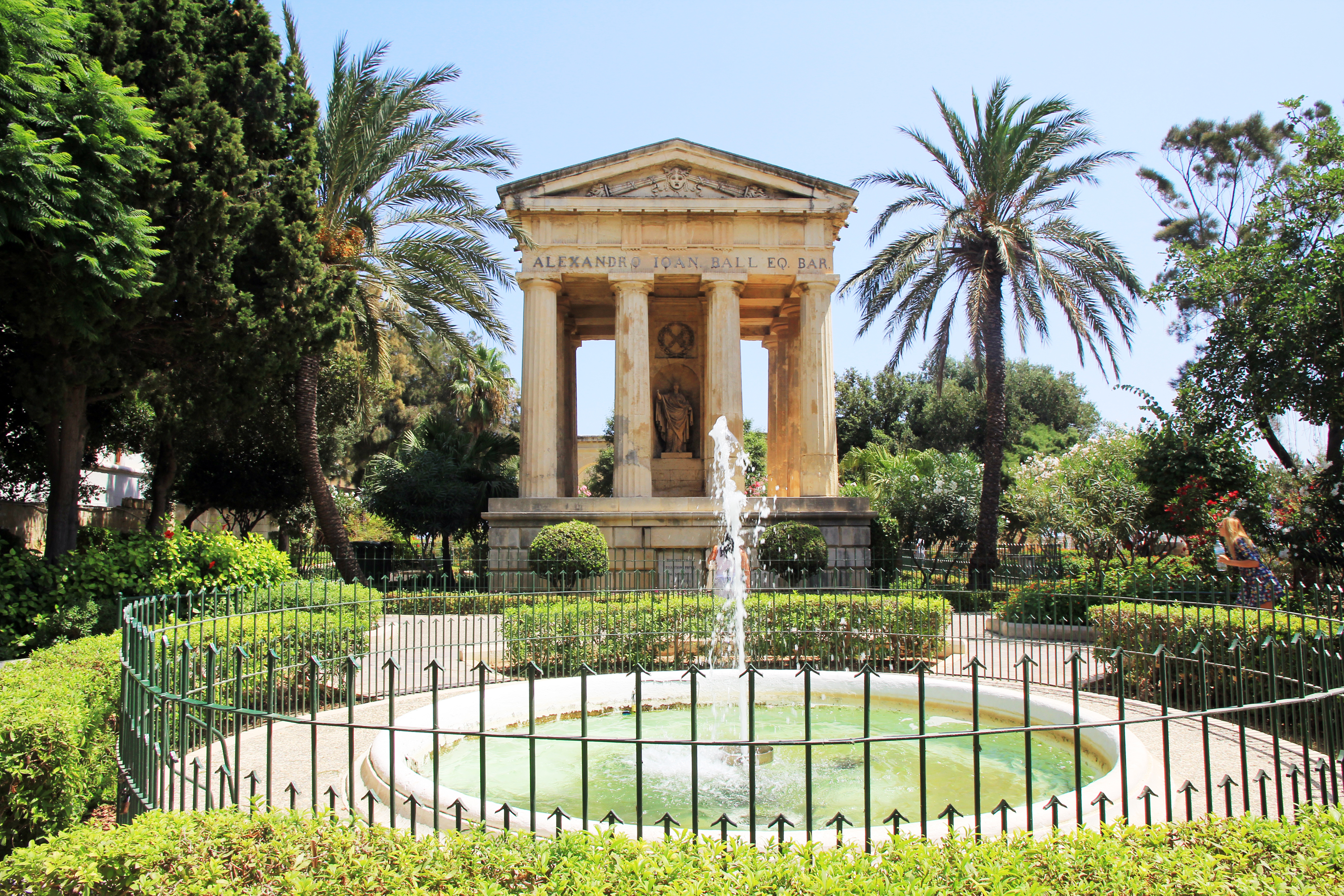
Lower Barrakka Gardens and its monument of remembrance

The architecture of Valletta's streets and piazzas ranges from mid-16th century Baroque to Modernist. The city is the island's principal cultural centre and has a collection of churches, palaces and museums that are among the city's main visitor attractions. When Benjamin Disraeli, future British Prime Minister, visited the city in 1830, he described it as "a city of palaces built by gentlemen for gentlemen," and remarked that "Valletta equals in its noble architecture, if it does not excel, any capital in Europe," and in other letters called it "comparable to Venice and Cádiz" and "full of palaces worthy of Palladio."

Buildings of historic importance include St John's Co-Cathedral, formerly the Conventual Church of the Knights of Malta. It has the largest painting by Michelangelo Merisi da Caravaggio, his only signed work. The Auberge de Castille et Leon, formerly the official seat of the Knights of Malta of the Langue of Castille, Léon and Portugal, is now the office of the Prime Minister of Malta. The Grandmaster's Palace, built between 1571 and 1574 and formerly the seat of the Grand Master of the Knights of Malta, used to house the Maltese Parliament, now situated in a purpose-built structure at the entrance to the city, and now houses the offices of the President of Malta.

Admiralty House is a Baroque palace dating to the late 1570s. It was the official residence of the Commander-in-Chief of the Mediterranean Fleet during the British era from the 1820s onwards. From 1974 until 2016, it was the site of the National Museum of Fine Arts.

The Manoel Theatre (Maltese: Teatru Manoel) was constructed in just ten months in 1731, by order of Grand Master António Manoel de Vilhena, and is one of the oldest working theatres in Europe. The Mediterranean Conference Centre was formerly the Sacra Infermeria. Built in 1574, it was one of Europe's most renowned hospitals during the Renaissance. The fortifications of the port, built by the Knights as a magnificent series of bastions, demi-bastions, cavaliers and curtains, approximately 100 metres (330 ft) high, all contribute to the unique architectural quality of the city.

=== Neighbourhoods ===
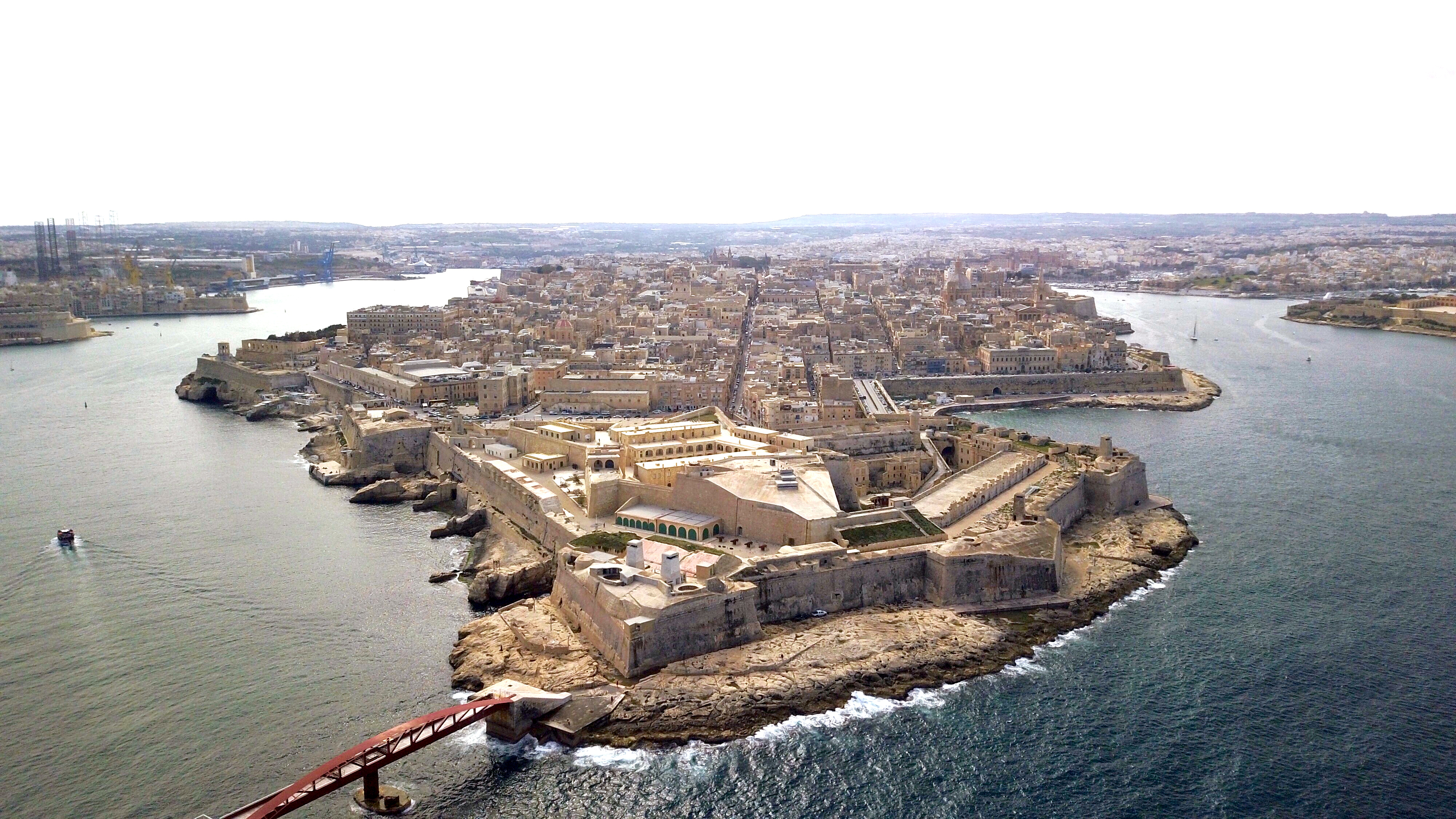
Valletta in the foreground and Fort Saint Elmo at the front

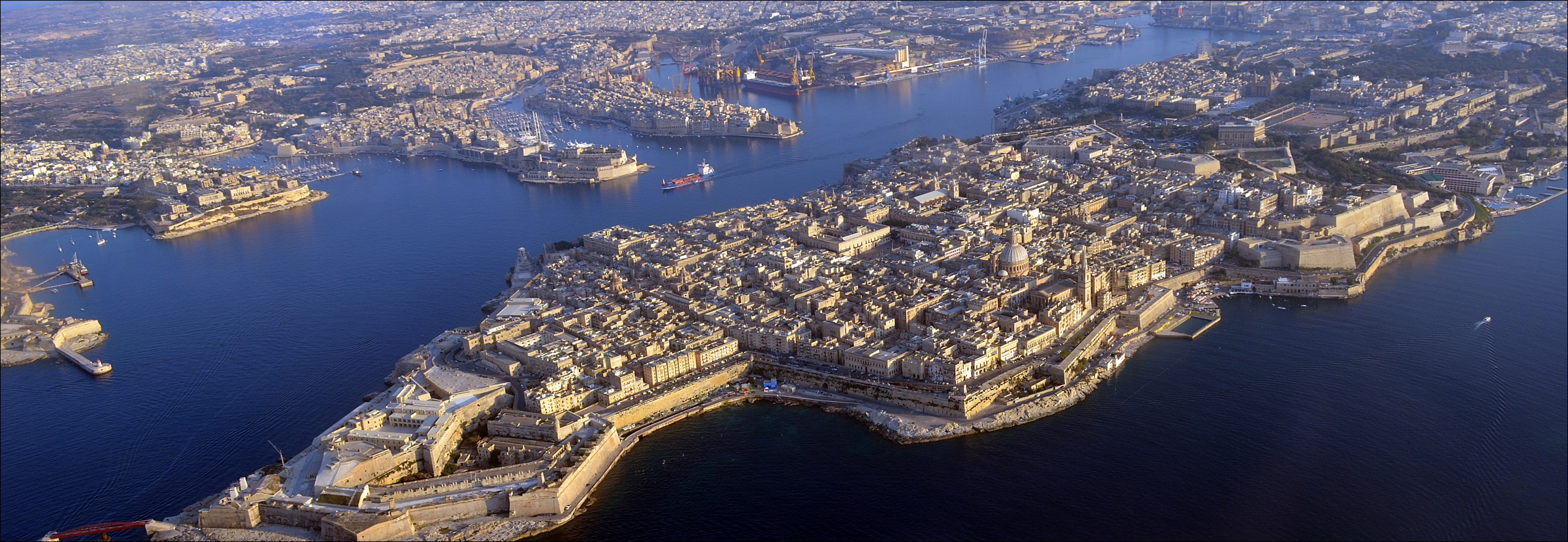
Exterior and interior outlines of Valletta

Valletta contains a number of unofficial neighbourhoods, including:

- Strada Rjali – the main thoroughfare, Triq ir-Repubblika
- l-Arċipierku – an area close to the Sacra Infermeria. Its name possibly derives from archipelago since it contains a number of lanes which break up the area into many "islands" of houses, or from archi-borgo since the area is located just outside Fort Saint Elmo.
- il-Baviera – an area around the English Curtain, bounded by Old Bakery, Archbishop, Marsamxett and St. Sebastian Streets. It is named after Auberge de Bavière.
- il-Biċċerija – an area close to il-Baviera, named after the slaughterhouse which was formerly located there.
- il-Kamrata – an area close to the Sacra Infermeria. It is named after the Camerata, a spiritual retreat which was demolished in the 19th century and replaced by social housing.
- Deux Balles (Maltese: Duwi Balli) – an area close to il-Baviera. The name probably originates from the French occupation.
- il-Fossa – an area close to the Jews' Sally Port and Fort Saint Elmo. It is regarded as the worst maintained area of Valletta.
- Manderaggio (Maltese: il-Mandraġġ) – an area behind Manderaggio Curtain, bounded by St. Mark, St. Lucia, St. Patrick and Marsamxett Streets. This was meant to be a small harbour (mandracchio) but it was never completed, and a slum area developed instead. The slums were demolished in the 1950s and were rebuilt as housing estates.

== Economy ==
Eurostat estimates the labour force in 2015 for the greater Valletta area at around 91,000 people. This corresponds to a share of just under 50 percent of Malta. As in Malta as a whole, tourism is an important economic sector. The most important tourist zone is the area surrounding the Grand Harbour. For the cruise industry, after several years of planning, work began in 2002 to build the Valletta Waterfront Project, a cruise terminal, in the Grand Harbour. There is also a publishing house in Valletta, Allied Newspapers Ltd., a media company. This company publishes the two market-leading newspapers, Times of Malta and The Sunday Times of Malta.

== Education ==
The Valletta Campus of the University of Malta is situated in the Old University Building. It serves as an extension of the Msida Campus, especially offering international masters programmes.

A church school, "St. Albert the Great", is also situated in Valletta. The Headmaster is the Democratic Alternative politician Mario Mallia.

== Culture ==
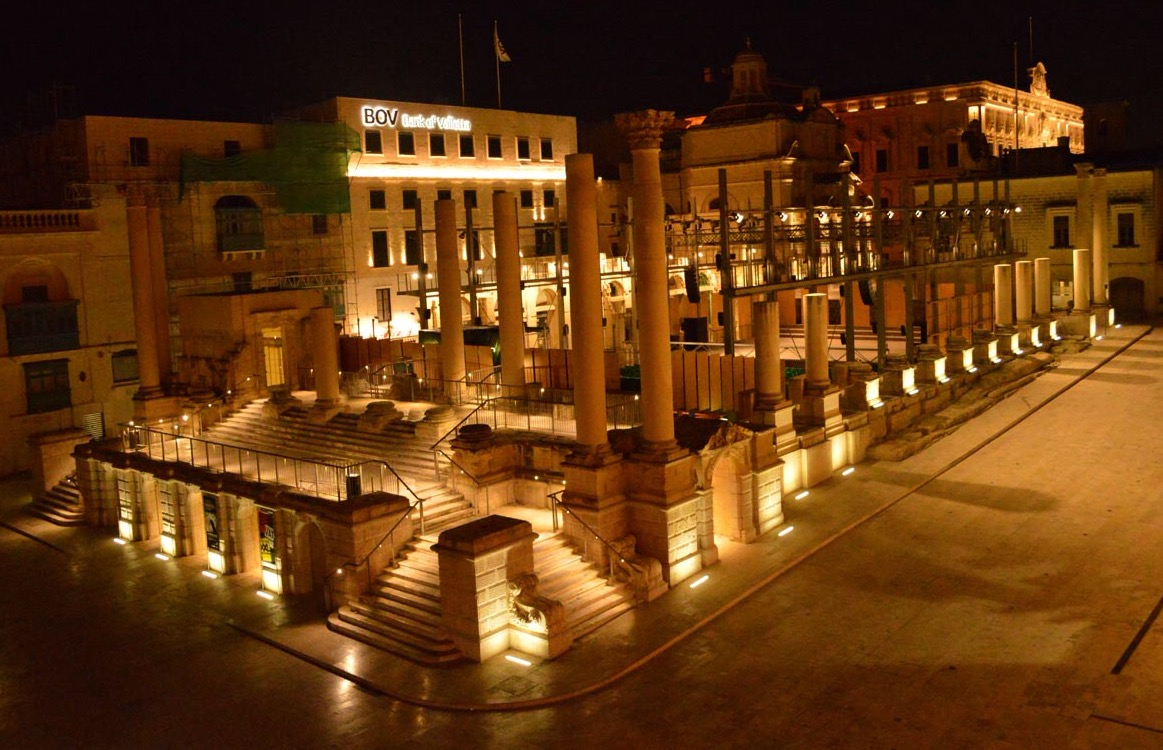
Renzo Piano's Pjazza Teatru Rjal on the ruins of the Royal Opera House

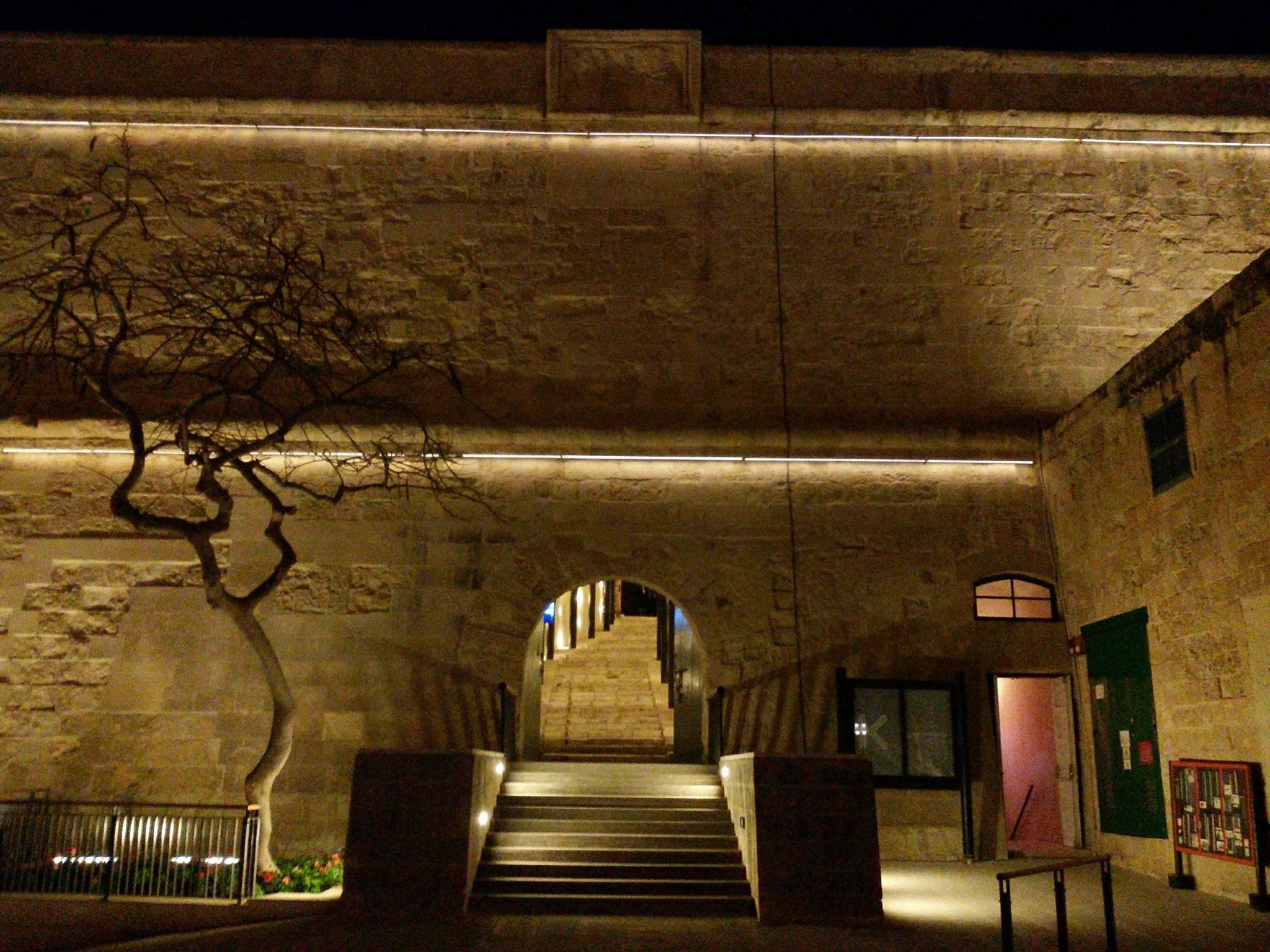
Saint James Cavalier at night

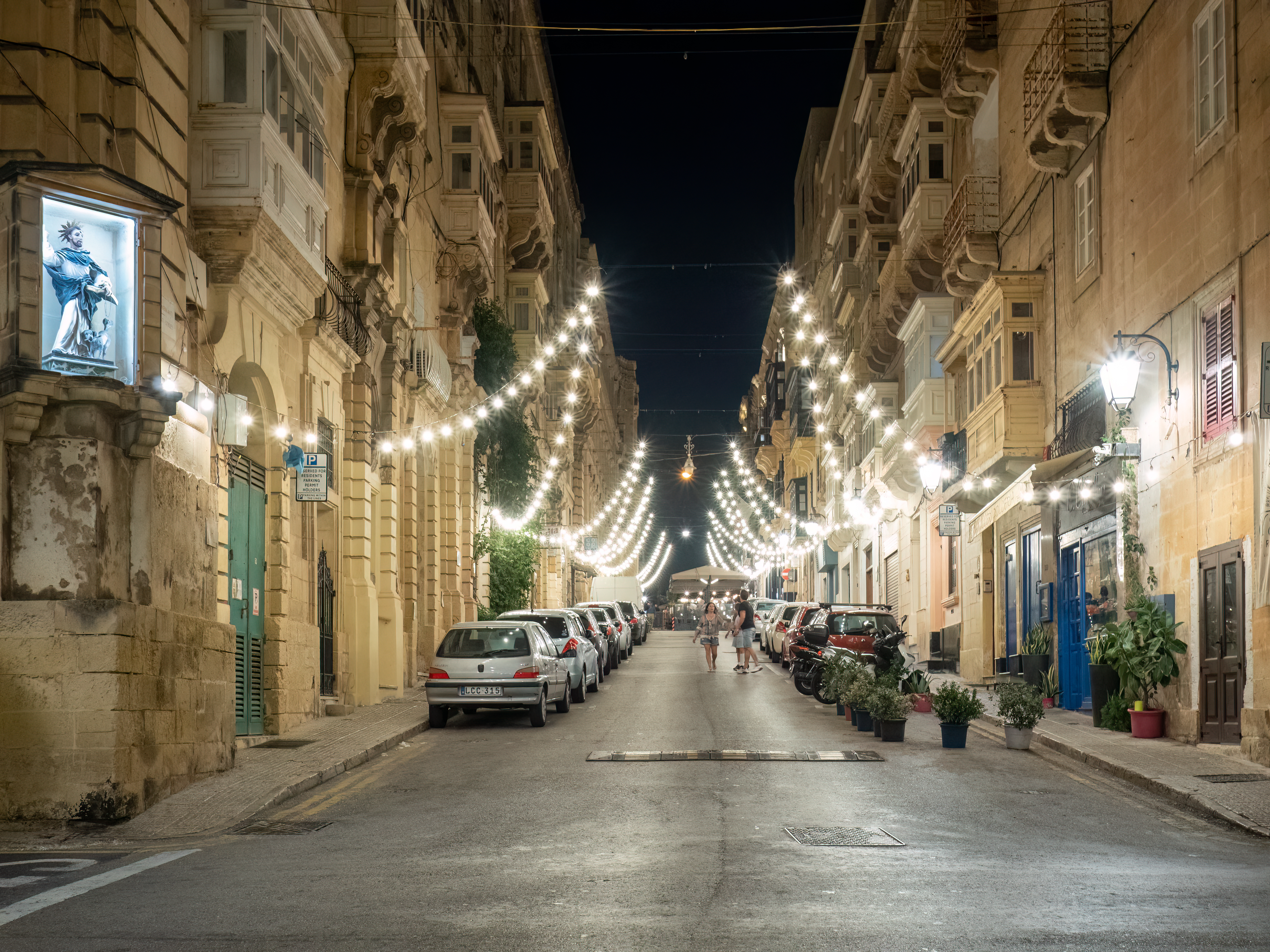
Merchants Street at night, with a statue of Saint Dominic

Valletta was designated European Capital of Culture for 2018. The year was inaugurated with an event called Erba' Pjazez (Four Squares), with shows focused in 4 plazas in the city – Tritons' Fountain, St. George's Square, St. John's Square, and Castille Square – along with other shows in other points. This was followed by the unveiling of a public art installation, Kif Jgħid il-Malti (Maltese Sayings), which featured a number of Maltese language proverb figured in gypsum, in order to engage linguistic heritage.

=== Saint James Cavalier ===
Saint James Cavalier, originally a raised gun platform, was converted into a Centre of Creativity in the year 2000 as part of Malta's Millennium Project. It now houses a small theatre, a cinema, music rooms and art galleries. Various exhibitions are regularly held there. It has welcomed over a million visitors since opening.

=== Music ===
The Valletta International Baroque Festival is held every year in January. Jazz music in Malta was introduced in the Strait Street area, frequented by Allied sailors during both World Wars. Malta's Jazz Festival took place here. Strait Street is also known as The Gut. This area is undergoing a programme of regeneration. The city's dual band clubs are the "King's Own Band Club" (Maltese: L-Għaqda Mużikali King's Own) and "La Valette National Philharmonic Society" (Maltese: Is-Soċjetà Filarmonika Nazzjonali La Valette).

=== Carnival ===
Valletta is the scene of the Maltese Carnival, held in February each year, leading up to Lent.

In 1823, the Valletta carnival was the scene of a human crush tragedy in which at least 110 boys died.

=== Feasts ===
- The feast of Our Lady of Mount Carmel is celebrated on 16 July
- Saint Paul's feast is celebrated on 10 February
- Saint Dominic's feast is celebrated in Valletta on 4 August or before
- The feast of Saint Augustine is celebrated on the third Sunday after Easter
- The city's residents also conduct an annual procession in honour of St. Rita

=== In literature and the arts ===
- The poetical illustrations "Valetta, Capital of Malta". (painted by T. C. Dibden, engraved by J. Tingle) and "Strada St. Ursola,—Malta". (painted by Samuel Prout, engraved by J, Carter) by Letitia Elizabeth Landon were both published in Fisher's Drawing Room Scrap Book, 1837. A further poem Jesuits in Procession—Valetta, Malta. illustrates a painting of the procession in the Strada St Giovanni painted by Samuel Prout and engraved by E. Challis is in Fisher's Drawing Room Scrap Book, 1838.

== Twin towns – sister cities ==
Valletta is twinned with:

- Palermo, Italy
- Pisa, Italy
- Cortona, Italy, since 26 August 2022
- Rhodes, Greece
- Byblos, Lebanon
- Piran, Slovenia
- Portsmouth, United Kingdom

== Transport ==
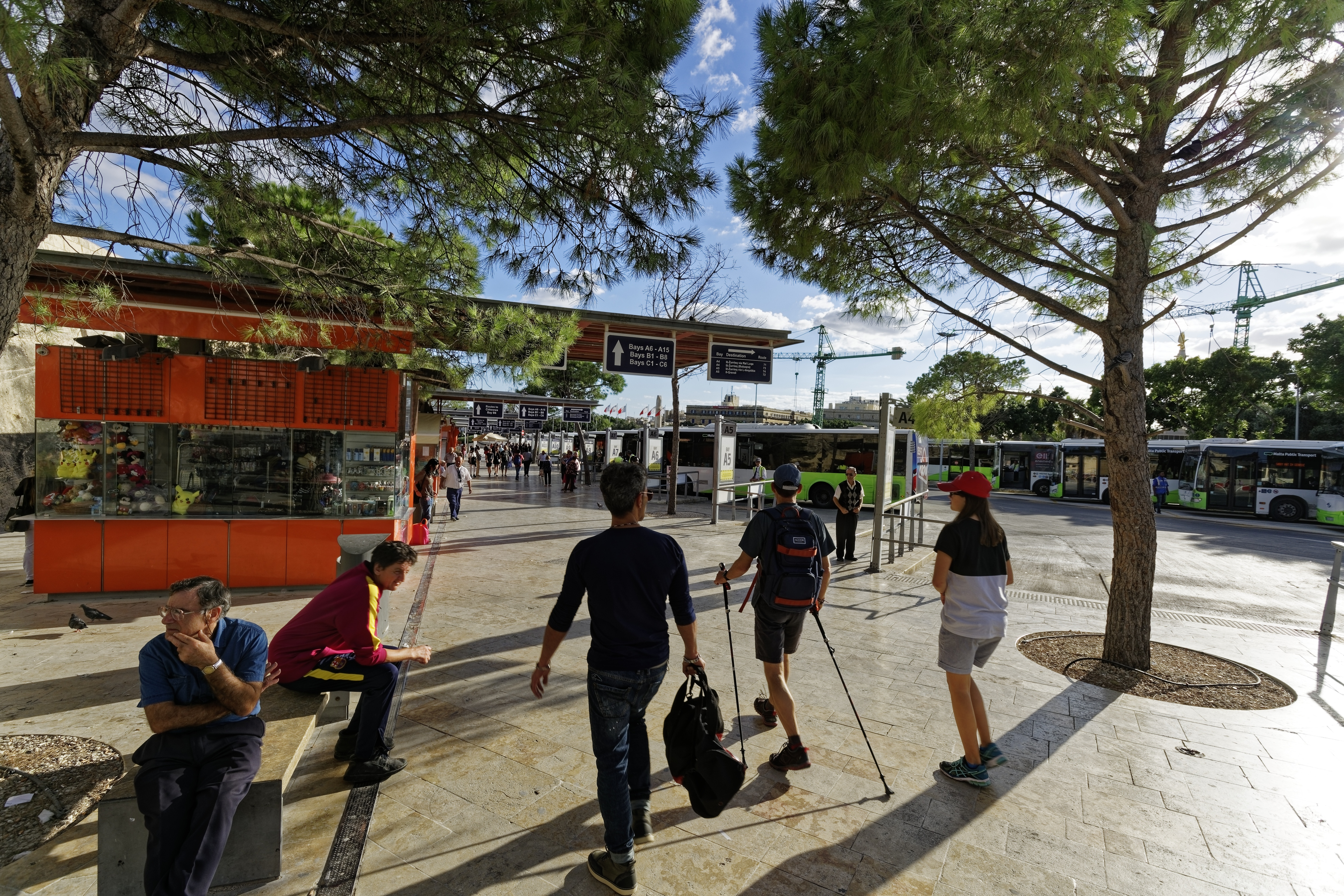
Bus station at Valletta

Malta International Airport is 8 kilometres (5.0 mi) from the city in the town of Luqa. Malta's public transport system, which uses buses, operates mostly on routes to or from Valletta, with their central terminus just outside the city gate. Traffic within the city itself is restricted, with some principal roads being completely pedestrian areas. In 2006, a park and ride system was implemented in order to increase the availability of parking spaces in the city. People can leave their vehicles in a nearby Floriana car park and transfer to a van for the rest of the trip.

In 2007, a congestion pricing scheme was implemented to reduce long-term parking and traffic while promoting business in the city. An ANPR-based automated system takes photos of vehicles as they enter and exit the charging zone and vehicle owners are billed according to the duration of their stay.

Valletta is served by a fleet of electric taxis which transport riders from 10 points in Valletta to any destination in the city.

As of 2021, an underground Malta Metro is being planned, with a projected total cost of €6.2 billion, centred on the Valletta urban area.

Virtu Ferries offer passenger and goods services to Pozzallo and Catania, Sicily.

== Sports ==
- Valletta F.C. Association Football team and Futsal team
- Valletta Lions RFC Rugby Football Union team
- Valletta's Marsamxett Harbour a "Regatta" (Rowing) Team, which takes part in the annual traditional Regatta on Victory Day (8 September).
- Valletta United W.P.C., a Water Polo Club hailing from Marsamxett side
- Valletta V.C., a Volleyball club.
- Marsamxett Boċċi, a ''Boċċi'' Club from Marsamxett, Valletta.
- Valletta St. Paul's Boċċi, a ''Boċċi'' Club from L-Arċipierku side, Valletta.
