= Malta Rugby Union National Championship =

- Current season or competition: 2023/2024 Cisk Lager League
- Sport: Rugby union
- Number of teams: 5
- Country: Malta
- Related competition: Mediterranean Bank Cup and Ray Elliot Cup

The Malta Rugby Union National Championship, better known as the Cisk Lager League for sponsorship reasons, is the highest tier of Rugby Union in Malta. It is sponsored by Cisk Lager and run by the Malta Rugby Football Union. Champions of the previous season play the winner of the Mediterranean Bank Cup, which runs parallel, in the Ray Elliot Cup, which serves a super cup.

The league is played in the Marsa Sports Complex since the clubs do not own stadiums.

== Teams ==
The league consists of five teams:

- Stompers RFC
- Ħamrun Kavallieri RFC
- Qrendi Falcons RFC
- Swieqi Overseas RFC
- UM Wolves RFC

Former teams include Qormi Wasps, Valletta Lions, and Birkirkara Alligators.
