= Malta Rugby Union National Cup =

Rugby tournament that takes place in Malta

- Current season or competition: 2017 Mediterranean Bank Cup
- Sport: Rugby union
- Number of teams: 4
- Country: Malta
- Related competition: Cisk Lager League and Ray Elliot Cup

The Malta Rugby Union National Cup, better known as the Mediterranean Bank Cup, is a rugby union tournament which runs parallel to the Malta Rugby Union National Championship in Malta. It is sponsored by the Mediterranean Bank. The winner of the previous season plays the winner of the Cisk Lager League, play in the Ray Elliot Cup, which serves as a super cup.

The cup is played in the Marsa Sports Complex since the clubs do not own stadiums.

== Format ==
In 2017, the format was upgraded to a round robin format in the first phase, with the second phase having the first-placed team against the fourth-placed, and the second against the third. A bonus point system is used.
