= Birkirkara Alligators RFC =

Rugby union club in Malta

- Full name: Birkirkara Alligators Rugby Football Club
- Nickname: Alligators
- Founded: 1990 (as Malta University RFC)
- Location: Birkirkara, Malta
- Ground: John Borg Complex
- President: Adrian Hillman
- League: Malta Rugby Union Championship
Team kit

Birkirkara Alligators RFC is a Maltese rugby club in Birkirkara. They competed in the Malta Rugby Union National Championship.

== History ==
The club was founded in 1990 as the Malta University RFC. In 1995 the name of the club changed due to many of the founding members graduating from the university. They were initially sponsored by the Alley Bar in Paceville, leading to the name of Alleygators RFC.
