= Paul Borg Olivier =

Maltese politician

Paul Borg Olivier OMC, OSI
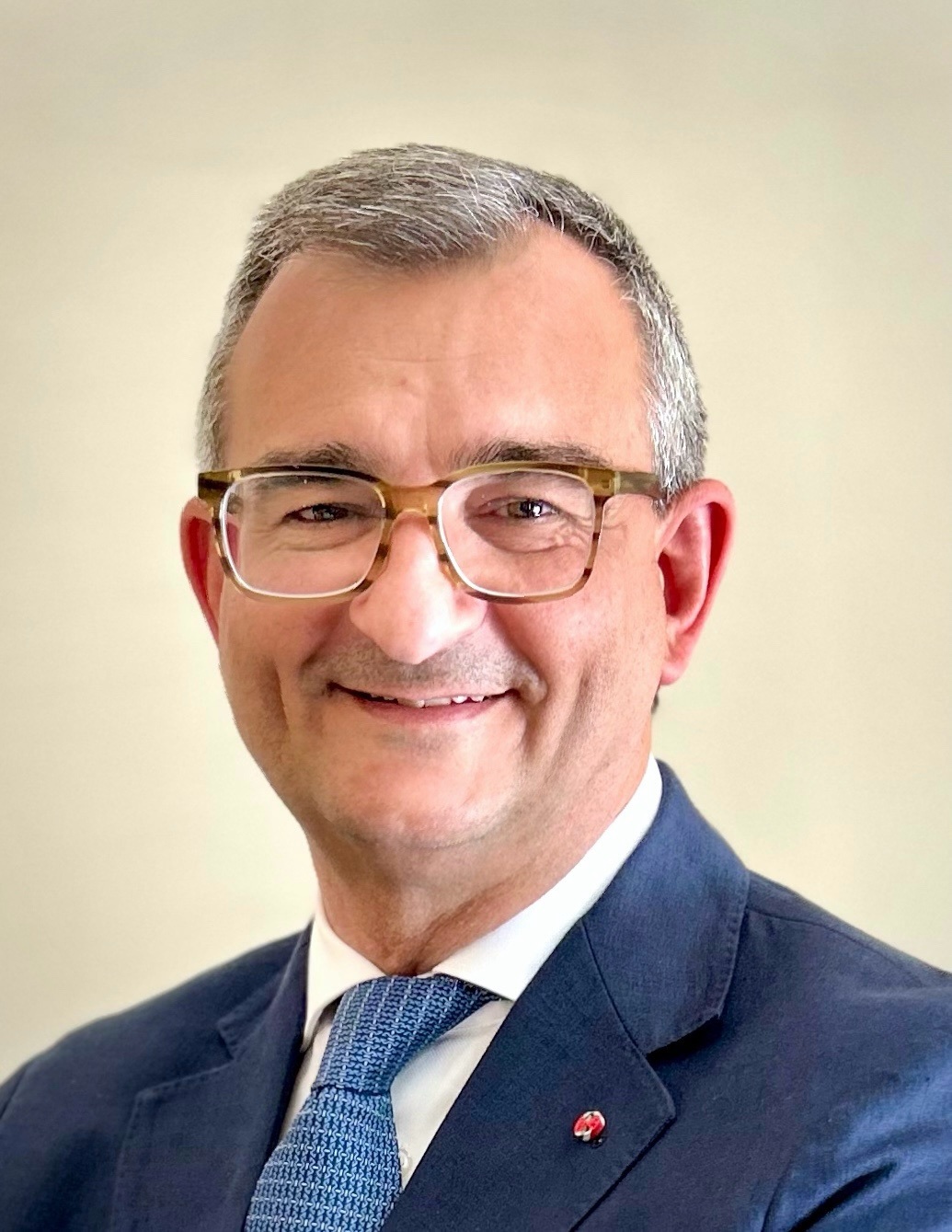

Secretary-General PN
- In office June 2008 – June 2013
- Preceded by: Joe Saliba
- Succeeded by: Chris Said

Mayor of Valletta
- In office 1999–2008
- Preceded by: Hector Bruno
- Succeeded by: Alexiei Dingli

Personal details
- Born: 1 September 1969 (age 57) Valletta, Malta
- Party: Partit Nazzjonalista
- Spouse: Gloria Borg Olivier
- Education: University of Malta
- Occupation: Advocate and Legal Counsel, Kamra tal-Avukat, 1996, politician

Paul Borg Olivier (born 1 September 1969) is a Maltese politician, former mayor of the Maltese capital city Valletta and Secretary-General of the Nationalist Party.

== Early life and education ==
Borg Olivier was born in Valletta, to Paul Borg Olivier and Marie Therese née Huber, and is the youngest of five siblings.

He had a Catholic education and formation at both primary and secondary level, firstly at St. Joseph's School, following on to the Jesuit-run, St. Aloysius College, in Malta.

== University life ==
Borg Olivier read law and was conferred with a Doctorate in Law from the University of Malta in 1995.

During his time at university, Borg Olivier was elected to the Students’ Representative Council (KSU), and to the Senate of the University of Malta, the academic governing board.

Borg Olivier was also President of MZPN, the youth branch of Partit Nazzjonalista.

== Early legal career ==
Borg Olivier was admitted to the Maltese Bar of Advocates in 1996 and first served a Senior Associate with Fenech and Fenech Advocates (1996–2000), later setting up his private practice. During that period his role in the firm, and after, focused primarily on Litigation, pleading in the Courts of First Instance and Courts of Appeal.

== Political office ==
Borg Olivier stood as a Nationalist Party candidate (a party founded on Christian Democratic principles and member of the European Peoples Party) for National and Local Elections in the First Electoral District including Valletta in 1996, 1998, 2003 and 2008. He was first elected councillor to the Valletta Local Council in 1993, later to be elected Valletta Deputy Mayor (1996–99).

Borg Olivier was elected Mayor of Valletta, Malta's Capital City, for three consecutive terms (1999–2008).

Following his public elective roles, Borg Olivier was elected Secretary-General of the Nationalist Party in June, 2008 under the party leadership of Lawrence Gonzi, succeeding Joe Saliba shortly after the Nationalist Party was returned to government in 2008 for a third consecutive term.

After a party electoral defeat to the Labour Party at the end of the electoral mandate, Borg Olivier decided not to re-contest for the post. His five-year term of office came to an end in June 2013. He was succeeded by Chris Said, former Minister of Justice in the Lawrence Gonzi Government (2008–2013).

Preceded by Joe Saliba	Secretary-General of the Nationalist Party; 2008–2013	Incumbent

== Exit from politics (2013) ==
Borg Olivier exited the political scene in 2013 and returned to his private legal practice. He headed the legal team winning one of Malta's important cases before the Constitutional Court of Malta. The case related to the fundamental human rights and freedoms in electoral processes based on free and fair elections as listed in the European Convention on Human Rights. As a result of this case National Parliament was recomposed in the number of Members of parliament to better reflect the vote of the electors in the 2013 General Elections.

Borg Olivier successfully led constitutional and human rights cases against the Malta Broadcasting Authority and the state-run television stations in landmark cases for breach of right of freedom of expression.

He has also pleaded and appeared before the Court of Justice of the European Union, defending individual petition for human rights in Luxembourg.

== Family members of interest ==
Paul Borg Olivier is the nephew of former Maltese Prime Minister Giorgio Borg Olivier and grandson of Paolo Borg Olivier, a former Nationalist Party Minister. List of political families#Malta

== Photography ==
Paul Borg Olivier took up photography in 2013. In 2015 he was awarded, from amongst 900 world entries, First Prize in the I Shot it Competition, partnered with Leica. He shoots with Leica M cameras and lenses and his main subjects are Valletta, Street Photography and Documentary Photography. In 2014, he was interviewed on the Leica Camera Blog.

== Personal life ==
Paul is married to Gloria and they have one daughter, Maria Pia, born in 2005.

- he is a Council member of the International Law Association, (Malta Branch);
- President of the Società Dante Alighieri, Comitato di Malta; and
- Member of the Committee of Management of the Casino Maltese
- Past Alumni of the IVLP

Paul Borg Olivier is currently a practicing lawyer.

== Honours ==
- Italy:

Knight - Order of the Star of Italy, 2021;

- Spain:

Knight Commander (Encomienda) in the Order of Civil Merit, Orden del Mérito Civil), 2008;

- Sovereign Military Order of Malta:

Order pro merito melitensi, Medaglia pro Merito Melitensi (Argento), 2008;

- Hungary:

Hero of Freedom Medal (commemorative award), 2006.
