= Joe Saliba =

Maltese politician and poet

Secretary General PN
- In office 1999–2008

Personal details
- Party: Partit Nazzjonalista
- Website: www.pn.org.mt

Joe Saliba was the Secretary General of the Nationalist Party of Malta (1999–2008), taking over from Lawrence Gonzi.

Saliba undertook most of the strategy and statistical work of the party, and to date is one of the most successful Secretaries General in Malta, holding a record three consecutive wins at a national level, two general elections, and a referendum on Malta's membership with the EU.

In 2012, he was awarded the second-place National Book Prize in the Poetry in Maltese category for Spiral, an anthology of over 100 poems and 201 haiku he wrote between 1995 and 2010 when he was of Secretary General with the Nationalist Party. It was published in 2011 by Klabb Kotba Maltin and contains an introduction by Professor Joe Friggieri and a foreword by Rev. Professor Peter Serracino Inglott.

He also wrote a number of theatrical works, including a stage adaptation of Oliver Friggieri's novel Fil-Parlament ma Jikbrux Fjuri in 1987.

Preceded by Lawrence Gonzi	Secretary General of the Nationalist Party of Malta; 1999 – 2008	Succeeded by Paul Borg Olivier
