= Alexiei Dingli =

Maltese artificial intelligence researcher (born 1979)

Mayor of Valletta
- In office 11 July 2008 – 9 January 2019
- Preceded by: Paul Borg Olivier
- Succeeded by: Christian Micallef

Personal details
- Born: 29 December 1979 (age 46) Malta
- Party: PN
- Education: University of Sheffield (B.S., Ph.D.); Grenoble School of Management (M.B.A.)
- Profession: Professor of artificial intelligence

Alexiei Dingli (born 29 December 1979) is a Maltese artificial intelligence researcher who is professor of artificial intelligence at the University of Malta. As a member of the Nationalist Party (PN), he was the mayor of Valletta, the capital of Malta, between 2008 and 2019.

== Early life and education ==
Dingli grew up in Valletta. He graduated with a first-class Bachelor of Science degree in IT and obtained a Doctor of Philosophy in computer science from the University of Sheffield. He also earned a Master of Business Administration degree with specialisation in technology management from the Grenoble School of Management.

== Mayor of Valletta ==
Dingli began volunteering for the Nationalist Party (PN) when he was 11 and was elected to their committee in Valletta when he was 15. He was elected to the city council in 2005 with the second highest number of votes. In July 2008, Paul Borg Olivier resigned to concentrate on his role as secretary general of the PN, and Dingli succeeded him as mayor on a unanimous vote by the council.

In October 2011, Dingli launched Valletta's bid for European Capital of Culture. Eleven months later, the bid was successful.

On 9 January 2019, Dingli resigned as mayor. Later that month, he told journalist and Valletta author Ramona Depares that despite his support of business, residents were being affected by restaurants bringing noise to residential areas, too many hotels were opening at once, and landlords were allegedly causing problems in order to make tenants move out.

== Post-political career ==
In January 2024, Dingli went on the Maltese version of Shark Tank to search for investors for Digital Traffic Brain, an AI-driven traffic management system that seeks to ease Malta's congestion problem. He requested €1 million for 40% in the company, but struck a deal with energy businessman Mark Bajada for €1.3 million in exchange for 50% of the company. Later that month, Dingli was named on the board at HSBC Bank Malta.

In October 2025, Maltese public television channel TVM broadcast the series Artificial Intelligence in Our Lives, the country's first series to have an AI presenter. The presenter was based on Dingli's appearance and mannerisms, but its voice was based on real recordings and not a synthetic replication, as AI has little exposure to the Maltese language. Dingli said that AI presenters would outperform humans, a position challenged by former Public Broadcasting Services newsreader Keith Demicoli.
