= Valletta Lions RFC =

- Full name: Valletta Lions Rugby Football Club
- Nickname(s): Lions
- Location: Valletta, Malta
- President: Kevin Busuttil
- Coach(es): Jim Hunter
- League(s): Malta Rugby Union Championship
Team kit

Valletta Lions RFC was a Maltese rugby club in Valletta. They competed in the Malta Rugby Union National Championship.
