= List of leaders of the opposition of Malta =

Fourteen people have served as Leader of the Opposition of Malta since the office was established in 1921. The post did not exist in the period between 1933 and 1947, nor between 1958 and 1962.

== List of officeholders ==
Political parties

Constitutional Party
Nationalist Party
Labour Party

No.	Portrait	Name (Birth–Death)	Term of office			Political party
No.	Portrait	Name (Birth–Death)	Took office	Left office	Time in office	Political party
1		Sir Gerald Strickland (1861–1940)	October 1921	August 1927	5 years, 10 months	Constitutional Party
2		Sir Ugo Pasquale Mifsud (1889–1942)	August 1927	June 1932	4 years, 10 months	Nationalist Party
(1)		Lord Strickland (Note: Known as Sir Gerald Strickland between 1897 and January 1928.) (1861–1940)	June 1932	November 1933	1 year, 5 months	Constitutional Party
Office Abolished (November 1933 – November 1947)
3		Enrico Mizzi (1885–1950)	November 1947	September 1950	2 years, 10 months	Nationalist Party
4		Dom Mintoff (1916–2012)	September 1950	March 1955	4 years, 6 months	Labour Party
5		Giorgio Borġ Olivier (1911–1980)	March 1955	April 1958	3 years, 1 month	Nationalist Party
Office Abolished (April 1958 – March 1962)
(4)		Dom Mintoff (1916–2012)	March 1962	June 1971	9 years, 3 months	Labour Party
(5)		Giorgio Borġ Olivier (1911–1980)	June 1971	12 April 1977	5 years, 10 months	Nationalist Party
6		Eddie Fenech Adami (born 1934)	12 April 1977	12 May 1987	10 years, 30 days	Nationalist Party
7		Karmenu Mifsud Bonnici (1933–2022)	12 May 1987	26 March 1992	4 years, 319 days	Labour Party
8		Alfred Sant (born 1948)	26 March 1992	28 October 1996	4 years, 216 days	Labour Party
(6)		Eddie Fenech Adami (born 1934)	28 October 1996	6 September 1998	1 year, 313 days	Nationalist Party
(8)		Alfred Sant (born 1948)	6 September 1998	5 June 2008	9 years, 273 days	Labour Party
9		Charles Mangion (born 1952) ad interim	5 June 2008	1 October 2008	118 days	Labour Party
10		Joseph Muscat (born 1974)	1 October 2008	11 March 2013	4 years, 161 days	Labour Party
11		Lawrence Gonzi (born 1953)	11 March 2013	13 May 2013	63 days	Nationalist Party
12		Simon Busuttil (born 1969)	13 May 2013	4 October 2017	4 years, 144 days	Nationalist Party
13		Adrian Delia (born 1969)	6 October 2017	7 October 2020	3 years, 1 day	Nationalist Party
14		Bernard Grech (born 1971)	7 October 2020	10 September 2025	4 years, 338 days	Nationalist Party
15		Alex Borg (born 1995)	10 September 2025	Incumbent	342 days	Nationalist Party

== See also ==
- Leader of the Opposition of Malta
- Prime Minister of Malta
- President of Malta
- Government of Malta
- House of Representatives of Malta
