= Adrian Delia =

Maltese politician and lawyer (born 1969)

The Honourable Adrian Delia MP

Leader of the Opposition
- In office 6 October 2017 – 7 October 2020
- President: Marie Louise Coleiro Preca; George Vella
- Prime Minister: Joseph Muscat; Robert Abela
- Preceded by: Simon Busuttil
- Succeeded by: Bernard Grech

Leader of the Nationalist Party
- In office 17 September 2017 – 3 October 2020
- Preceded by: Simon Busuttil
- Succeeded by: Bernard Grech

Member of Parliament
- Incumbent
- Assumed office 4 October 2017
- Constituency: Seventh District (2017-2022); Eighth District (2022-)

Personal details
- Born: 8 August 1969 (age 57) Sliema, State of Malta
- Party: Nationalist Party
- Spouse: Nickie Vella De Fremaux (Divorced)
- Domestic partner: Cynthia Galea
- Children: 6
- Education: University of Malta

Adrian Delia, MP (born 8 August 1969, in Sliema, Malta) is a Maltese politician, and lawyer by profession. He was the head of the Nationalist Party and the leader of the opposition from September 2017 till October 2020.

== Early life ==
Adrian Delia grew up in Birkirkara. He received his formation from the Jesuit St Aloysius' College. He graduated as a lawyer from the University of Malta in 1993.

== Professional life ==
Delia started out in the Legal Office of Mid-Med Bank, a bank later acquired by HSBC and branded as HSBC Malta. Delia founded his legal firm Aequitas Legal. He acted as Director and Company Secretary of Erste Bank Malta.

== Involvement in football ==
Delia was elected as vice-president of Birkirkara F.C. in June 2011, while also representing the club in the council of the Malta Football Association. He then was president of Birkirkara from 29 May 2015 till 29 June 2017 following his announcement that he would be taking an active role in politics.

Under the presidency of Delia the club achieved the first qualification in the third qualifying round in the UEFA Europa League in Season 2016–17. Delia famously lured in former Italian international Fabrizio Miccoli. The team won a match against West Ham United F.C., but were eliminated on penalties. After the match West Ham showed interest in Birkirkara's Mauricio Mazzetti, but Delia commented that no formal offers had been made.

== Involvement in politics ==
Adrian Delia worked for Radio 101 during his student years.

He was approached by Mario de Marco on behalf of the Nationalist Party (Malta) to contest the 2013 Maltese general election and 2017 Maltese general election, which he both declined for career reasons.

In 2017, after the Simon Busuttil's announced departure as Leader of the Nationalist Party further to the loss in the 2017 elections, Delia was the first to contest the leadership of the party. He resigned from Birkirkara F.C. on 28 June 2017. His nomination was made official on 17 July 2017. Delia faced Chris Said, Frank Portelli and Alex Perici Calascione. In August 2018, it was reported that Adrian Delia was possibly the most popular throughout the race, as his lack of political experience was seen as an advantage. On 17 September 2017 he was confirmed as Leader of the Nationalist Party.

Delia has served as a member of Parliament since 2017.

== Leader of the Nationalist Party ==
During the beginning of his tenure, Delia started reworking the image of the Nationalist Party. In fact the team installed was no longer made up by a majority of lawyers, which was typical of the party, but instead included a sociologist, an economist, a banker and an engineer. He also reintroduced the party to the man in the street, by visiting villages and their local clubs.

He took a socially conservative stance in politics in general, flagging Malta as lacking traditional moral values and national soul, and has come out against the relaxation of drug laws and liberalisation of prostitution. Delia also raised security concerns from lack of community policing where necessary. He also came out against vacation leave for homosexual women seeking IVF treatment abroad, a parliamentary motion which proved unpopular and was lost.

On 16 October 2017, further to the death of Daphne Caruana Galizia, he expressed concerns over rule of law, calling the incident "the collapse of democracy and freedom of expression." He called for Joseph Muscat, then Prime Minister of Malta, to assume responsibility of what happened by resigning. Delia however declined to join protests, saying it would not be appropriate for him to be present, given their past feud.

On 3 February 2018, as Opposition Leader, Delia reshuffled spokespersons within the Parliamentary Group and took the shadowing of the Justice Ministry in hand.

On 20 May 2018, Delia promised that a PN government, if elected, would repay the money overcharged from energy bills.

Further to the conclusions of the magisterial inquiry with regards to ownership of Egrant, Delia requested that the report would be published in full, and wrote to the Advocate General to provide him with a full copy. Furthermore, Delia removed Simon Busuttil from Shadow Minister for Good Governance and asked him to resign on 22 July 2018. Delia assumed the Good Governance portfolio himself. His request was later backed by the Administrative Council of the Party.

On 23 June 2025, Delia announced that he would once again submit his candidacy for leadership of the Nationalist Party. He later lost the contest to Alex Borg.

== Controversies ==
In 2017, Daphne Caruana Galizia accused Delia of links to a London-based prostitution racket. Delia denied the allegation. In a later interview, in May 2018, he promised to resign if any such activity is ever found.

During the same period, in September 2017, Delia was also linked to freemasonry, a link he denied.

=== Domestic violence conviction ===
In September 2018, several of Malta's human rights NGOs called out Delia for his comments about foreigners causing a threat to Maltese identity and values, calling them "abhorrent". The NGOs were also "shocked and disgusted", saying that by "using inflammatory language and calling for affirmation of the Maltese identity" he had "accused non-Maltese nationals of instilling feelings of fear and insecurity".

In late December 2018 Delia was accused of domestic violence, with calls for him to step down from the leadership of the PN. including by former PN general secretary Rosette Thake.

In late October 2026, during separation proceedings, Malta's Family Court found him responsible for the breakdown of their marriage, notably due to adultery and domestic violence. The court also found that Delia had mismanaged jointly held assets and ordered him to repay up to €900,000 to his former wife and her parents.

== Income tax ==
January 2018, Dr Delia had reached an agreement with the Inland Revenue Department to start settling dues dating back more than a decade. The first bill, which covered the period between 2007 and 2013, totaled €81,751. It consisted of €48,374 in unpaid tax, a €4,604 penalty and €28,773 in interest. For the period 2014 to 2017 the pending bill of income tax was €64,086.

Delia's in-laws paid the PN leader around €55,000 on 23 March 2018 and €65,000 on 20 April 2018 to settle his tax bill.
