= Robert Arrigo =

Maltese politician (1954–2022)

Honourable Robert Arrigo MP

Member of Parliament
- In office 24 May 2003 – 18 October 2022

Deputy Leader of the Nationalist Party
- In office 18 November 2017 – 24 April 2022
- Leader: Adrian Delia; Bernard Grech
- Preceded by: Beppe Fenech Adami
- Succeeded by: Alex Perici Calascione

Mayor of Tas-Sliema
- In office 1994–2003
- Succeeded by: Albert Bonello

Personal details
- Born: 4 December 1954 Sliema, Malta
- Died: 18 October 2022 (aged 67) Malta
- Party: Nationalist Party
- Spouse: Mary Arrigo
- Children: Alan Arrigo; Andrew Arrigo
- Website: www.robertarrigo.com

Robert Arrigo MQR (4 December 1954 – 18 October 2022) was a Maltese tourism operator and politician who served a member of the House of Representatives of Malta for the Nationalist Party from 2003 until his death in 2022. Between 2017 and 2022 he was also deputy leader for party affairs of the Nationalist Party. Arrigo was a prominent businessman in Malta and was a previous mayor of Sliema as well as chairman of Sliema Wanderers and vice-president of Neptunes WPSC. He was educated at Stella Maris College, Balzan, St. Aloysius' College, Birkirkara, and the University of Malta, Msida.

== Business ==
Arrigo's main business interests were within the travel and tourism industry, in fact he was the director of Robert Arrigo & Sons Limited, which is a Quality Assured Destination Management Company (DMC) and an incoming tour operator in Malta.

He also operated a number of hotels on the island.

== Politics ==
Arrigo was elected the first mayor of Sliema (in the interests of the Nationalist Party) in 1994, and confirmed with the highest count votes in Malta in 1997, 2000 and 2003, breaking his own record from one election to the other. Later on in 2003, Arrigo was elected to the 10th Maltese Parliament, in the interests of the Nationalist Party on the first attempt from the Malta 10th electoral district. He has worked in some committees and parliamentary groups. He previously also held a post within the party itself. Independently, he has also served as a National Tourism of Malta board advisor.

In 2006, his wife Mary (aka Marina) Arrigo, was elected as the first woman mayor of Sliema.

On 13 December 2022, he was posthumously awarded the Midalja għall-Qadi tar-Repubblika by then-President George Vella.

== Football ==
Arrigo first served as a chairman of Gżira United of nearby Gżira. He then became active within Sliema Wanderers. In 1996 he was elected as a chairman of Sliema Wanderers, and he proved quite successful winning a number of trophies. He also had several controversies, the most renowned being a bitter relationship with Dr. Joe Mifsud, the chairman of the Malta Football Association, and chairmen of some other clubs. In 2008, he stepped down from the chairmanship post and said that he will contribute by offering to sponsor the club.

Party political offices
| Preceded by Beppe Fenech Adami | Deputy Leader of the Nationalist Party; 2017–2022 | Succeeded by Alex Perici Calascione |
