= Kristján Helgason =

Icelandic snooker player

Personal information
- Born: 27 March 1974 (age 52)

Sport
- Country: Iceland
- Sport: Snooker
- Professional: 1995–1997, 1998–2004
- Highest ranking: 66 (2003/2004)
- Best ranking finish: Last 32 (x3)

Kristján Helgason (born 27 March 1974) is an Icelandic former professional snooker player.

== Career ==
Born in 1974, Helgason turned professional in 1995. In 1998, he reached the last 48 at the Irish Open, losing 3–5 to Billy Snaddon, but made no further progress in any tournament that season.

The following season, he reached the last 32 at the 2000 Scottish Open, where he defeated Nick Pearce, John Read and Jamie Burnett before losing 3–5 to Mark Williams. In that year's World Championship, he beat Joe Jogia, John Lardner, Joe Johnson, Rod Lawler and Terry Murphy to set up a meeting in the first round at the Crucible Theatre with Stephen Lee. Becoming the first Icelander to appear at the Crucible, Helgason lost 3–10.

In the last 48 at the 2002 China Open, Helgason faced Anthony Hamilton, building a 4–0 lead with consecutive breaks of 93, 91 and 83; however, Hamilton won the next five frames to run out a 5–4 victor.

Helgason played at the last 32 stage of a ranking event for the third time at the 2002 British Open; there, he defeated Jin Long, Ryan Day, Stuart Bingham, Patrick Wallace and Dave Harold, but lost 3–5 to Paul Hunter.

Having reached a career-high ranking of 66th for the 2003/2004 season, Helgason played in only the first two tournaments, losing in the LG Cup 4–5 to Ian Brumby and in the British Open, 4–5 to Michael Wild. He finished the season ranked 103rd, and lost his professional status at the age of 30.

He played in the Gibraltar Open during March 2020.

== Performance and rankings timeline ==
Tournament	1994/ 95	1995/ 96	1998/ 99	1999/ 00	2000/ 01	2001/ 02	2002/ 03	2003/ 04	2013/ 14	2015/ 16	2017/ 18	2019/ 20
Ranking	(Note: He was an amateur.)	(Note: New players on the Main Tour don't have a ranking.)	(Note: New players on the Main Tour don't have a ranking.)	105	74	70	75	66				
Ranking tournaments
World Open (Note: The event was called the Grand Prix (1994/1995–1995/1996, 1998/1999–2000/2001) and the LG Cup (2001/2002–2003/2004))	LQ	LQ	LQ	1R	LQ	LQ	LQ	LQ	A	NH	A	A
UK Championship	LQ	LQ	LQ	LQ	1R	LQ	LQ	LQ	A	A	A	A
Scottish Open (Note: The event was called the International Open (1994/1995–1995/1996) and the Players Championship (2003/2004))	LQ	LQ	LQ	2R	LQ	1R	1R	LQ	Not Held		A	A
European Masters (Note: The event was called the European Open (1994/1995, 2001/2002–2003/2004) and the Irish Open (1998/1999))	LQ	A	LQ	Not Held		LQ	LQ	LQ	Not Held		A	A
Welsh Open	LQ	LQ	LQ	LQ	LQ	LQ	LQ	LQ	A	A	A	A
Gibraltar Open	Tournament Not Held									MR	A	1R
World Championship	A	LQ	LQ	1R	LQ	LQ	LQ	A	A	A	LQ	A
Non-ranking tournaments
Masters	A	A	A	A	LQ	A	A	A	A	A	A	A
Non-ranking tournaments
Six-red World Championship	Tournament Not Held								2R	2R	RR	NH
Former ranking tournaments
Dubai Classic	LQ	Tournament Not Held										
Malta Grand Prix	Non-Ranking Event			LQ	NR	Tournament Not Held						
Thailand Masters (Note: The event was called the Thailand Open (1994/1995))	LQ	A	LQ	LQ	LQ	LQ	NR	Tournament Not Held				
British Open	LQ	LQ	LQ	LQ	1R	LQ	2R	LQ	Tournament Not Held			
Irish Masters	Non-Ranking Event						LQ	LQ	Tournament Not Held			
China Open (Note: The event was called the China International (1998/1999))	Not Held		LQ	LQ	LQ	LQ	Not Held		A	A	A	NH

Performance Table Legend
LQ	lost in the qualifying draw	#R	lost in the early rounds of the tournament (WR = Wildcard round, RR = Round robin)	QF	lost in the quarter-finals
SF	lost in the semi-finals	F	lost in the final	W	won the tournament
DNQ	did not qualify for the tournament	A	did not participate in the tournament	WD	withdrew from the tournament

NH / Not Held	means an event was not held.
NR / Non-Ranking Event	means an event is/was no longer a ranking event.
R / Ranking Event	means an event is/was a ranking event.
MR / Minor-Ranking Event	means an event is/was a minor-ranking event.

== Career finals ==
=== Amateur finals: 16 (12 titles) ===
Outcome	No.	Year	Championship	Opponent in the final	Score
Winner	1.	1993	IBSF World Under-21 Championship	(Sri Lanka) Indika Dodangoda	11–7
Winner	2.	1994	Iceland Amateur Championship	(Iceland) Gunnar Valsson	9–4
Winner	3.	1996	Iceland Amateur Championship	(Iceland) Johannes Johannesson	9–6
Runner-up	1.	1996	EBSA European Championships	(Scotland) Graham Horne	5–8
Winner	4.	1997	Iceland Amateur Championship	(Iceland) Johannes Johannesson	9–5
Runner-up	2.	1997	EBSA European Championships	(Finland) Robin Hull	3–7
Runner-up	3.	1998	Iceland Amateur Championship	(Iceland) Johannes Johannesson	5–9
Winner	5.	1998	EBSA European Championships	(Malta) Alex Borg	7–2
Runner-up	4.	2005	EBSA European Championships	(Malta) Alex Borg	2–7
Winner	6.	2012	Iceland Amateur Championship	(Iceland) Thorri Jensson	9–1
Winner	7.	2017	Nordic Snooker Championship	(Finland) Patrik Tiihonen	5–2
Winner	8.	2017	Iceland Amateur Championship	(Iceland) Jon Ingi Ægisson	9–0
Winner	9.	2017	European 6-Reds Championship	(England) Wayne Brown	5–2
Winner	10.	2018	Iceland Amateur Championship	(Iceland) Guðni Pálsson	9–1
Winner	11.	2019	Iceland Amateur Championship	(Iceland) Jon Ingi Ægisson	9–2
Winner	12.	2019	European Snooker Open	(Spain) Francisco Sanchez-Ruiz	4–1
