= Bonaparte à Malte =

2008 book by Frans Sammut

- Author: Frans Sammut
- Original title: Bonaparti f'Malta
- Language: French
- Genre: History
- Publisher: Argo
- Publication date: 2008
- Publication place: Malta
- Media type: Print (Paperback)
- Pages: 153
- ISBN: 978-99932-88-06-0

Bonaparte à Malte is a 2008 book by Maltese writer Frans Sammut, with an introduction by Dr Paul Borg Olivier. The Maltese original, Bonaparti f'Malta, was published in 1997.

Citing contemporary documents from Malta's archives, it provides a detailed account of the six days Napoleon Bonaparte spent in Malta in 1798, as well as an analysis of the political situation under the Order of St John of Jerusalem and the political and cultural consequences of Bonaparte's conquest of Malta.

In the words of fellow writer and former Prime Minister of Malta, Alfred Sant, Napoleon and his impact on Malta were "enduring subjects of [Sammut's] interests and research".

It is the first account in the French language of those six days. At the Eighth Congress of the International Napoleonic Society, Sammut gave a presentation, "The Enlightenment in Malta and the Coming of Bonaparte", based on his research for Bonaparte à Malte.

Sammut argued that Napoleon, despite his brief stay in Malta, made a determined effort to bring the country into the modern era. He issued numerous decrees to thoroughly reorganize Malta's government and society and tirelessly worked to review the nation's laws and regulations. The abolition of noble titles and privileges and the ending of slavery were the first measures he implemented. He ordered the expulsion of the Inquisitor and the release of the Order's political prisoners, including the Maltese patriot, Mikiel Anton Vassalli, who shared his Enlightenment ideals and whom he described as "the most intelligent prisoner (ever) locked in a cell". Voicing his surprise that fundamental subjects such as mathematics, physics and astronomy were not yet being taught at the University of Malta, he also instituted a series of educational reforms.

Sammut characterized Napoleon as "a different kind of leader... more of an intellectual strategist and philosopher", a quality placing him in the highest rank of commander together with Julius Caesar and Alexander the Great.

Some of Sammut's research for Bonaparte à Malte also went into his 1994 historical novel about Vassalli, Il-Ħolma Maltija (The Maltese Dream), described by Alfred Sant as "his masterpiece" and by British author and poet Marjorie Boulton as "a colossal work".

According to Prof. Anne-Marie Mésa of the University of Reims Champagne-Ardenne, Frans Sammut's "point of view is actually original, well reasoned out, nuanced and subtle – as one would expect from all works on history. A true pleasure to read!”; Frans Sammut was “self-evidently an excellent historian, as well as a rich personality and endowed with a vast culture”.
