= Mario Philip Azzopardi =

Maltese-Canadian television and film director (born 1958)

- Born: 19 November 1950 (age 75); Siġġiewi, Malta
- Occupations: Television director, film director, writer
- Known for: Stargate SG-1 (pilot), The Outer Limits, ZOS: Zone of Separation
- Notable work: Il-Gaġġa (1971), ZOS: Zone of Separation (2008)

Mario Philip Azzopardi (born 19 November 1950) is a Maltese-Canadian television and film director and writer.

== Early life and emigration ==
Azzopardi was born in Siġġiewi, Malta, and was educated at St Aloysius' College (Birkirkara, Malta), and the Royal University of Malta.

In 1971, while still a student at the university, he directed Il-Gaġġa, based on Frans Sammut's novel Il-Gaġġa, presumed to be the first full-length feature filmed entirely in Maltese. Transferred to digital format and enhanced, the film was re-released in Malta in March 2007. Around the same time, he assisted Cecil Satariano during the making of Giuseppi.

He left his native country for Canada in 1978, following a dispute with local censors and theatre authorities who, in 1977, had cancelled his play, Sulari Fuq Strada Stretta, on the grounds that it was too offensive; the play was eventually presented at the Manoel Theatre in January 2008.

He has worked on such shows as The Outer Limits, Stargate SG-1 (including its two-hour pilot) and Stargate Atlantis. In 2008, he directed all eight episodes of the HBO Canada/TMN miniseries ZOS: Zone of Separation, which he co-created and produced.

== Return to Malta ==
In 2013, Azzopardi returned to his native country, Malta and established the theatrical company Stagun Teatru Malti. The company has produced a wide array of original work in Maltese, including In-Nisa Maltin Jafu Kif, Jiena Nhobb, Inti Thobb, Il-Kappillan Ta Malta (based on the book by Nicholas Monsarrat) and Sibna z-Zejt, among others. Azzopardi was also appointed as Artistic Director of Valletta 2018. He also has produced and directed a number of films, such as Dangerous Arrangement, A Red Dress and Saul: A Journey To Damascus.

== Personal life ==
Azzopardi is married to Therese and has three children; Lara, Kyra and Yari.

== Controversy ==
Azzopardi courted controversy following comments made on his Facebook page in August 2014, agreeing with the 2001 decision taken by the European Court of Human Rights which had found that Sharia law was incompatible with democracy and basic human rights.

The V18 foundation issued a press release in which Mr Azzopardi was quoted as having apologized for the possible offence he could have caused by his personal views, expressed on 28 November, more than a year prior to his appointment as Artistic Director, after journalists from the Times of Malta publicised those views while interviewing Owen Bonnici, the Minister of Culture, the previous day.

== Partial filmography ==
- Gagga (1971)
- Deadline (1980)
- State of Survival (1986)
- Nowhere to Hide (1987)
- Divided Loyalties (1990)
- Palmer's Bones (1998)
- Bone Daddy (1998)
- Total Recall 2070 (television series) (1999)
- Thrill Seekers (2000)
- On Hostile Ground (2000)
- Stiletto Dance (2001)
- Wiseguy
- The Stork Derby (2002)
- Savage Messiah (2002)
- The Wives He Forgot (2006)
- Still Small Voices (2007)
- Lies and Crimes (2007)
- Saul: The Journey to Damascus (2014)
- Dangerous Arrangement (2015)
- Angela's Eyes
- Stargate: Atlantis
- Jeremiah
- Dinotopia
- The Outer Limits
- Stargate SG-1
- Dead Man's Gun
- F/X: The Series
- Two
- In the Heat of the Night
- Counterstrike
- The Flash
- Night Heat
- E.N.G.
