= Gaġġa =

- Directed by: Mario Azzopardi
- Written by: Frans Sammut (novel), Mario Azzopardi (screenplay)
- Produced by: Sammy Cremona
- Distributed by: Studio 7 (Malta)
- Release date: March 2007
- Running time: 75 minutes
- Language: Maltese

Gaġġa (Cage) is a 1971 film adaptation of the 1971 novel Il-Gagga written by Frans Sammut. The adaptation was written and directed by Mario Azzopardi, who was a film student at the time. The film was originally made as a thesis, but was released in 2007 due to its cultural importance, being the first feature film made with a script entirely in Maltese.
