= Chris Said =

Maltese politician

The Honourable Chris Said MP

Member of Parliament
- Incumbent
- Assumed office 9 March 2008

Parliamentary Secretary for Information and Dialogue
- In office 9 March 2008 – 5 January 2012
- Prime Minister: Lawrence Gonzi

Minister of Justice, Information and Dialogue
- In office 6 January 2012 – 10 March 2013
- Prime Minister: Lawrence Gonzi
- Preceded by: Carm Mifsud Bonnici
- Succeeded by: Emmanuel Mallia

Secretary General of the Nationalist Party
- In office 6 June 2013 – 2 June 2015
- Preceded by: Paul Borg Olivier
- Succeeded by: Rosette Thake

Personal details
- Born: 10 July 1970 (age 56) Nadur, Gozo, Malta
- Party: Nationalist Party
- Education: University of Malta

Chris Said (born 10 July 1970 in Nadur, Gozo) is a Nationalist Party politician from Malta.

== Personal life ==
Said is a lawyer by profession, having graduated with a Doctor of Laws from the University of Malta.

Said has three children: Anastasia, Andrea, and Benjamin.

== Politics ==
He was a mayor of his home town, Nadur. His brothers Charles and Edward have also occupied the position.

Following the 2008 Maltese general election, he was appointed Parliamentary Secretary for Public Dialogue and Information in the Office of the Prime Minister by Lawrence Gonzi.

Chris Said resigned from his post after there were accusations of perjury on September 23, 2010. Around a month later, on October 29, 2010, his name was cleared of accusations.

Further to resignation of Carm Mifsud Bonnici, Said was appointed Minister for Justice, Dialogue and the Family on January 6, 2012.

On June 6, 2013, he was appointed Secretary General of the Nationalist Party. He did not recontest the post in June 2015, at Simon Busuttil's request, in order to focus on Gozo for the upcoming election.

After the party's defeat in the 2017 Maltese general election Chris Said ran for leadership. Chris Said came runner-up while Adrian Delia was confirmed Leader of the Nationalist Party. Said conceded the defeat by congratulating Delia and stressing the need to unite the party.

On February 3, 2018, Delia requested Said to shadow the Gozo and Constitutional Reforms portfolios.

Further to the crisis within the party regarding Simon Busuttil's position further to the conclusions of the magisterial inquiry over the ownership of Egrant, Chris Said offered to mediate between the Busuttil and Adrian Delia, claiming that there should be strength in unity against corruption.
