= Alex Perici Calascione =

Maltese politician (born 1962)

Honourable Alex Perici Calascione MP
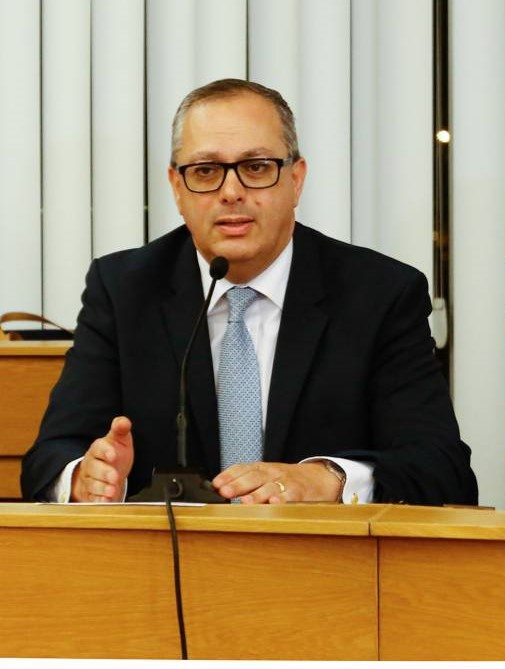

Deputy Leader of the Nationalist Party
- Incumbent
- Assumed office 30 July 2022
- Leader: Bernard Grech; Alex Borg
- Preceded by: Robert Arrigo

Member of Parliament
- Incumbent
- Assumed office 20 June 2026
- President: Myriam Spiteri Debono
- Prime Minister: Robert Abela
- Leader: Alex Borg

Personal details
- Born: June 17, 1962 (age 64) Malta
- Party: Partit Nazzjonalista
- Spouse: MayAnne Perici Calascione (née Pisani)
- Children: 3
- Education: University of Malta
- Profession: Lawyer
- Website: www.pcmlegal.com

Alex Perici Calascione (born June 17, 1962) is a Maltese politician and lawyer who currently serves as the deputy leader of the Nationalist Party (PN). He previously served as President of the party's executive committee until 2020, and as party treasurer until 2017.

== Biography ==
Perici Calascione studied at St Aloysius' College in Birkirkara and graduated in law at the University of Malta in 1986. He has practicised as a legal adviser since then, joining Emmanuel Mallia and Associates since 1984.

Prime Minister Eddie Fenech Adami appointed Perici Calascione as Commissioner of Justice in 1991. He served in the role until 1996, when he went back to Emmanuel Mallia and Associates. He later founded his own law firm, PCM Legal.

From 1998 till 2008, Perici Calascione was on the board of governors of Razzett tal-Hbiberija an NGO for persons with disabilities. He also represented the family of Karin Grech in the civil compensation case, between 2008 and 2010.

A member of the Partit Nazzjonalista, Perici Calascione run as candidate Member of the European Parliament at the 2009 European Parliament election in Malta;

From 2009 until 2013, Perici Calascione served on the Board of the Malta Council for Science and Technology.

Perici Calascione was elected to the executive committee of the Nationalist Party in March 2013 and subsequently elected to the post of party Treasurer and member of the Administrative Council. He was elected once again to the party's executive committee and confirmed as Treasurer in June 2015. Following his re-election in 2017 he was elected as President of the party's executive committee in July 2019 and in November 2020 was approved as a candidate for the forthcoming general election for the 8th and 11th Electoral Districts. During his term as President of the executive committee, Perici Calascione guided the Committee through a challenging period of the party's history and also presided over reforms aimed at modernising the party.

In 2022, Perici Calascione was the sole nominee for the post of deputy leader for the Nationalist Party. He was confirmed as deputy with 90% of the vote.

== Personal life ==
Alex Perici Calascione is married to MayAnne Perici Calascione (née Pisani), with whom he has three children.

Party political offices
Preceded by Robert Arrigo	Deputy Leader of the Nationalist Party; 2022–	Succeeded by Incumbent
