= Therese Comodini Cachia =

Maltese lawyer and politician

Therese Comodini Cachia MP
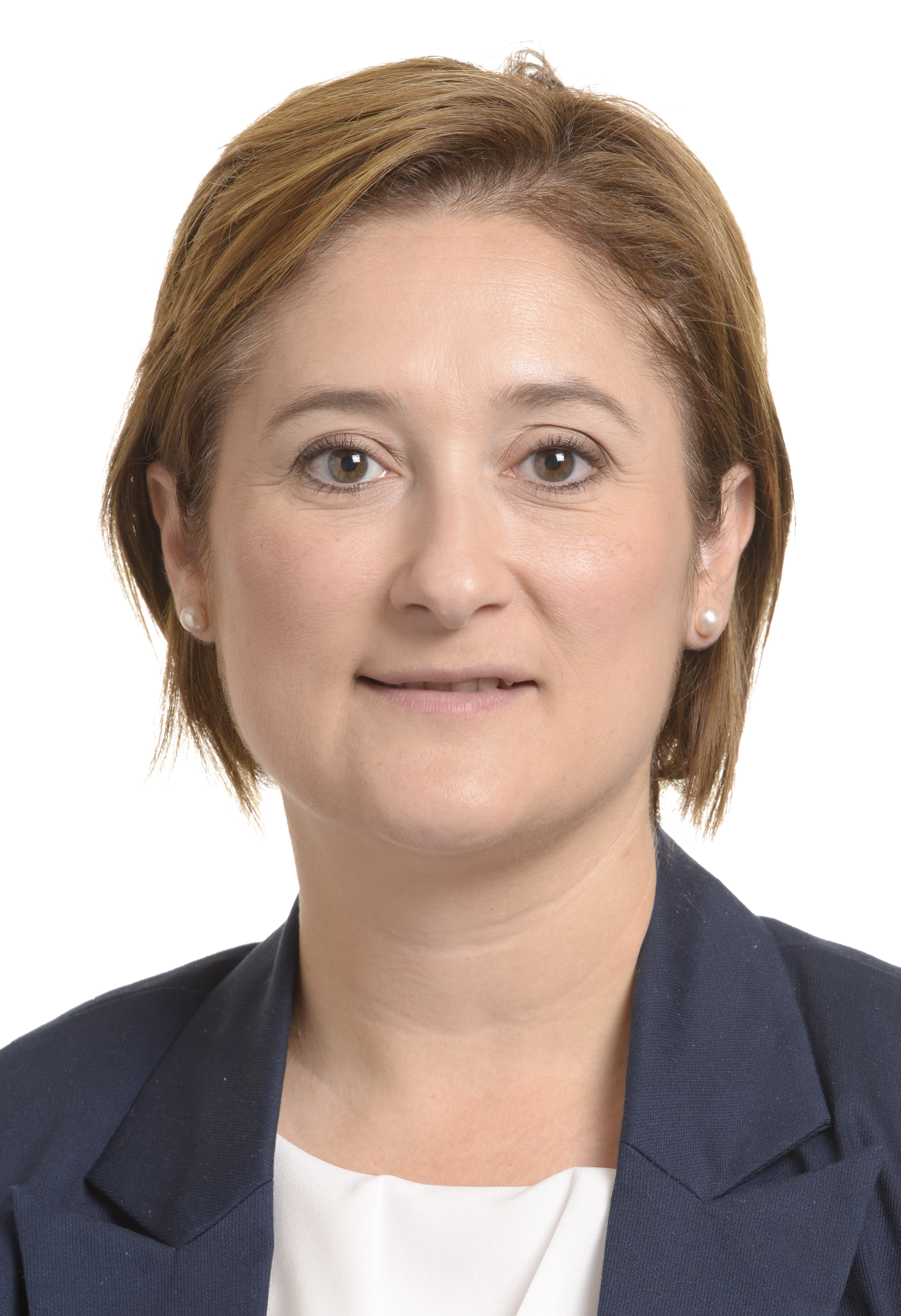

Member of the European Parliament
- In office 1 July 2014 – 23 June 2017

Personal details
- Born: Therese Cachia; February 23, 1973 (age 53) Attard, Malta
- Party: Nationalist Party
- Spouse: Vladimiro Comodini
- Education: University of Malta
- Profession: Lawyer

Therese Comodini Cachia (born 23 February 1973) is a Maltese lawyer and politician and former member in the European Parliament.

== Education ==
Comodini Cachia attended the University of Malta, where she earned two postgraduate degrees. She earned her Doctor of Law (LLD) in 1997, and later went on to finish her PhD in Human Rights Law in 2012.

== Professional career ==
Therese Comodini Cachia is a lawyer by profession working in the field of human rights. She has represented victims of human rights violations since 1997 at multiple levels, through court proceedings at the Superior Courts of Malta as well as at the European Court of Human Rights in Strasbourg. Her clients have included private individuals, commercial entities, government agencies, as well as legislatively constituted bodies.

In her law career she has acted as the legal advisor for several non-governmental organisations in Malta, including the Scout Association of Malta, the Maltese Confederation of Women Organizations, and the Mental Health Association of Malta.

From 2008 to 2010 she advised and consulted the National Commission for Equality (NCPE) on the nature of European law and equality directives, assisted investigations on discrimination, and aided a variety of other research projects.

Comodini Cachia is currently a lecturer at the University of Malta teaching Human Rights Law. She also coordinates the Masters in Human Rights and Democratisation degree at the university. She has previously served as visiting lecturer at Utrecht University in the Netherlands and Viadrina European University in Frankfurt am Oder, Germany.

== Political career ==
Comodini Cachia is a member of the Partit Nazzjonalista (Nationalist Party) in Malta, and has actively participated in the party. She is often seen as a point of reference for the parliamentary group having contributed to a number of positions, including amendments to the Constitution of Malta. She first contested for political office in the general elections for the Parliament of Malta in March 2013.

In 2013, she was appointed as a member of the PN's Commission for the Revision of the Statute and Party Structures. She was also appointed as co-chairperson of the Candidate's Forum together with Richard Muscat.

Before her election to the European Parliament, Comodini Cachia helped represent the Nationalist Party in a constitutional case against the Maltese Electoral Commission regarding disparity in the vote-counting process in the general elections of 2013 After a mistake in vote counting was challenged in court, she helped advocate for the PN during the lengthy and detailed legal process.

In May 2014, she was elected Member of the European Parliament. In the 2014 European elections in Malta, the Nationalist Party earned just over 40% of the national vote and captured three of Malta's six European seats. This marked the first time the PN was able to capture three seats in the European Parliament - the third seat won by Comodini Cachia. As an MEP, she sat with the Group of the European People's Party.

She served as a member on three committees and delegations in the European Parliament. Comodini Cachia was a member of the Committee on Legal Affairs (JURI), the Delegation for relations with the Palestinian Legislative Council, and the delegation to the Parliamentary Assembly of the Union for the Mediterranean. On the Committee on Legal Affairs, she served as the Parliament's rapporteur for copyright. In addition, she was a substitute member of the Subcommittee on Human Rights (DROI), the Committee on Culture and Education (CULT), and the delegation for relations with the People's Republic of China. Comodini Cachia also co-chairs the EU Diabetes Working Group in the Parliament.

Following her election as MEP, Comodini Cachia took on additional leadership roles in her home country. In October 2014, then Nationalist Party and opposition leader Simon Busuttil appointed her coordinator of the party's Policy Fora in Malta, and in January, 2015 the party appointed her as the PN's Shadow Minister for Education and Employment.

In 2017, she contested the general election and was elected on the eighth electoral district with 4,244 votes on the 22nd count. Initially, she had declined her seat but then reversed her decision and announced that she would resign as MEP and take her seat as a Member of Parliament.

On 9 July 2020, Comodini Cachia was nominated to head the Nationalist Party, after the incumbent leader, Dr. Adrian Delia, lost a no confidence vote.

== Publications ==
Comodini Cachia has presented her research and reports on subjects related to human rights (focusing on Malta) to multiple European institutions. She contributed to various publications of the Fundamental Rights Agency (FRA) of the European Union with a variety of works on trafficking of minors, racism, xenophobia, discrimination, protection of information, mental health, illegal immigration, and repatriation. She contributed to Malta at the European Court of Human Rights 1987-2021, edited by Mark A. Sammut.

Comodini Cachia presented reports on discrimination at work, on the basis of race, belief, or sexual orientation. She has published articles in the Human Rights Brief journal of American University's Washington College of Law, and also for the European Group of Public Law.

== Awards ==
In 2008, Therese Comodini Cachia was awarded the annual Ten Outstanding Young Persons (TOYP) award by Malta's Junior Chamber International (JCI) in two different categories - in Children, World Peace, and Human Rights, as well as in Political, Legal, and Government Affairs.

In March 2016, Comodini Cachia was named MEP of the Year by The Parliament Magazine in the field of corporate governance. The award was her first in Brussels, and the magazine stated that "Comodini Cachia has been praised for the enthusiasm and passion she brings to her work. She is dedicated to enhancing Maltese civil society's involvement in EU policymaking."

In March 2017, Comodini Cachia placed 27th in the POLITICO's list of the MEPs who matter in 2017 for her work on the copyright reform.

== Personal life ==
Cachia married Vladimiro Comodini. They have one child.
