= Frans Sammut =

Maltese author (1945–2011)

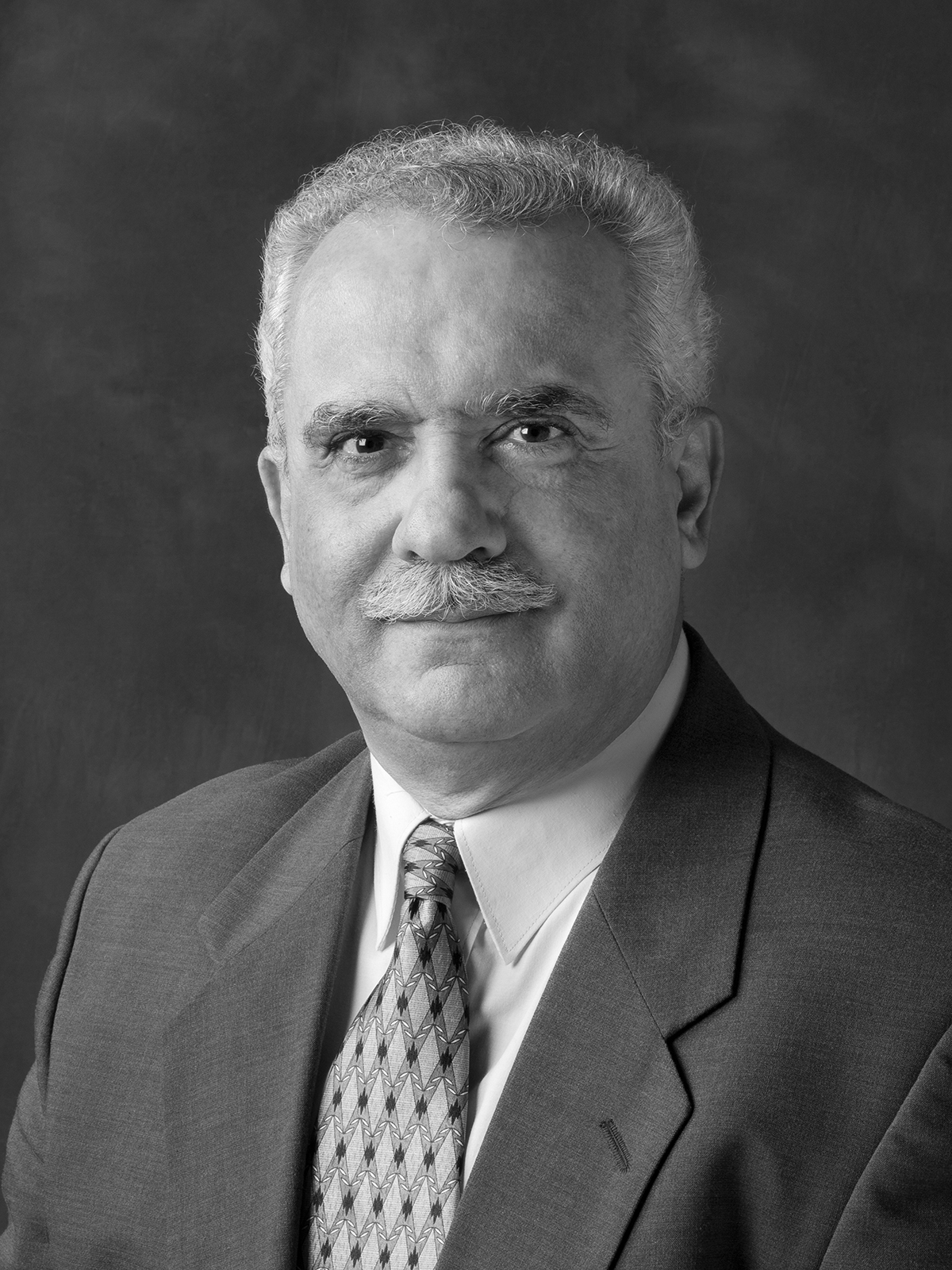
- Born: Francis Xavier Sammut; 19 November 1945; Ħaż-Żebbuġ, Malta
- Died: 4 May 2011 (aged 65); Malta
- Occupations: Playwright, novelist, short story writer, broadcaster, teacher, cultural consultant to the Prime Minister
- Writing career
- Notable works: Il-Gaġġa; Samuraj; Il-Ħolma Maltija; On The Da Vinci Code; Bonaparte à Malte

Frans Sammut (19 November 1945 – 4 May 2011) was a Maltese novelist and non-fiction writer.

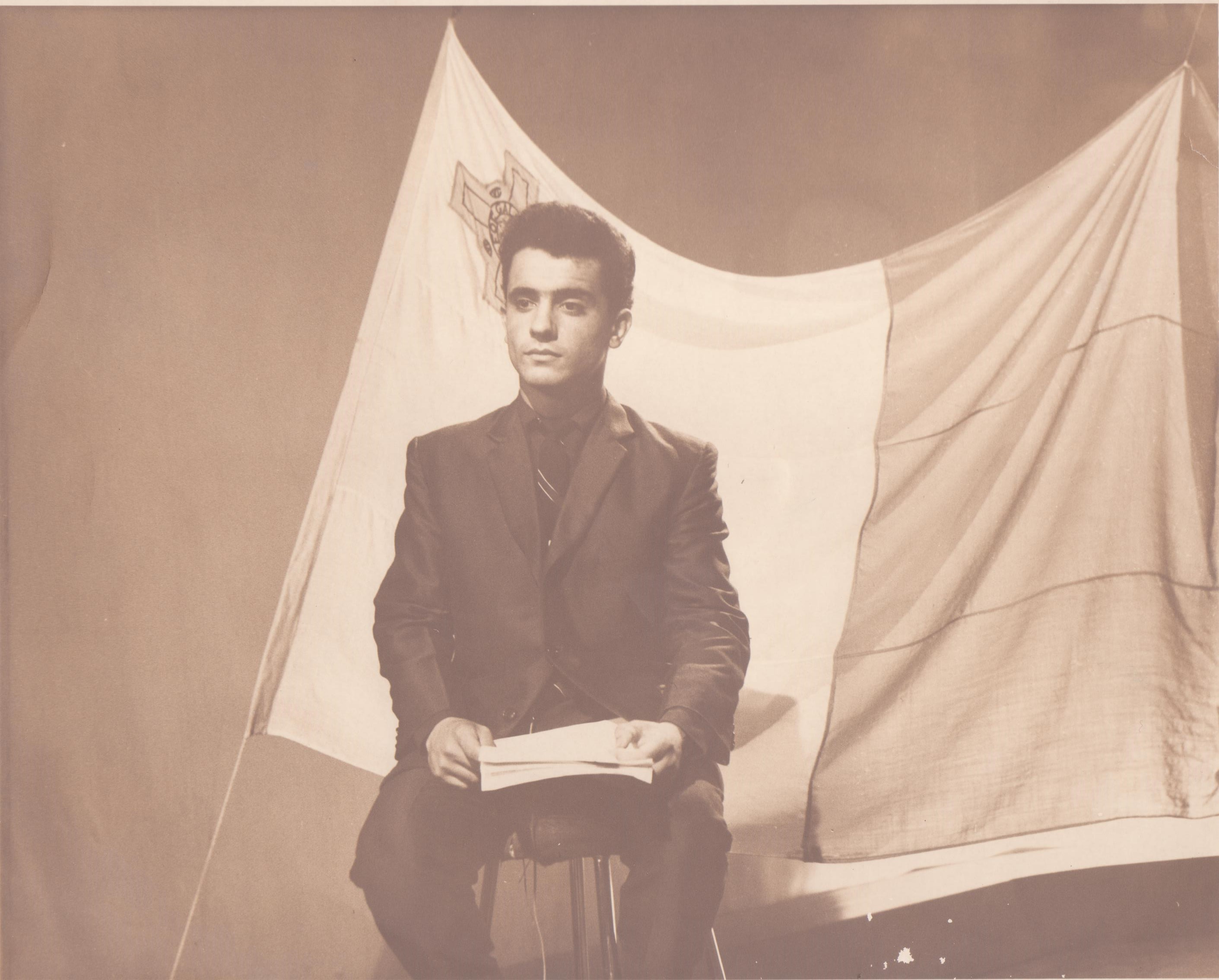
Frans Sammut and the Maltese Flag around 1970

== Personal life and education ==
Sammut was born in Zebbug, Malta. He was later married to Catherine née Cachia, with whom he had two sons, Mark and Jean-Pierre. His granddaughter, Katrine Sammut, is a Latvian author, who wrote Pino un Maksis vieni mājās.

Sammut studied at the Zebbug Primary School, St Aloysius' College, St Michael's Teacher Training College, the University of Malta (B.A., S.Th.Dip./Diploma in Sacred Theology, M.Ed.) and Perugia University (Diploma to teach Italian abroad).

== Career ==
Sammut first gained recognition in the early 60s when he was still in his mid-teens through his short story "L-Istqarrija," which won first place in a contest by Għaqda Kittieba Zgħazagħ, and through two other short stories which won second and fourth places in the same contest. In the late 1960s, he co-founded the Moviment Qawmien Letterarju (Literary Revival Movement). Later he served as Secretary of the Akkademja tal-Malti (Maltese Language Academy).

Sammut ended his career in education as a Head of School, though from 1996 to 1998 he was Cultural Consultant to the Prime Minister of Malta. In 2010, he was elected Fellow of the International Napoleonic Society.

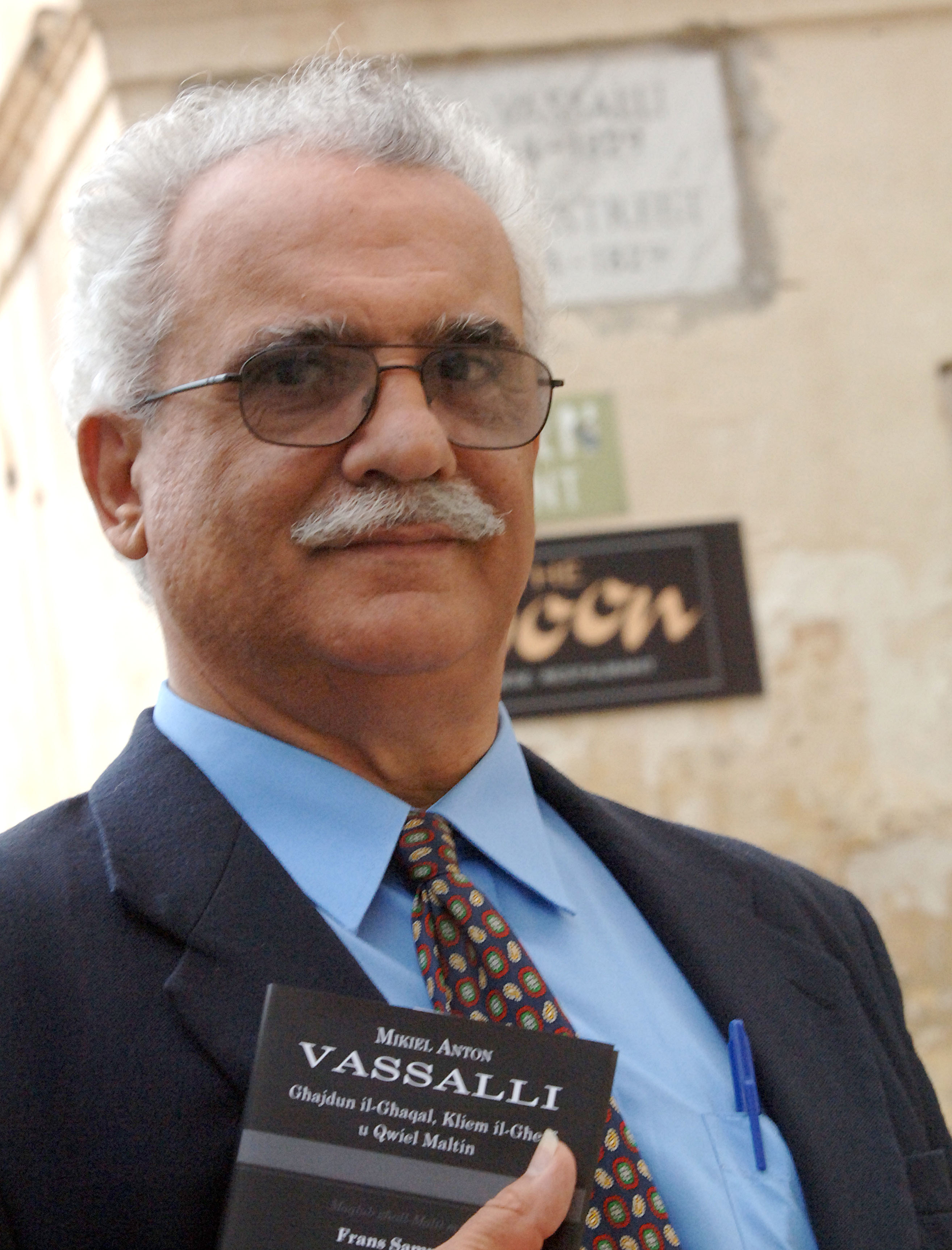
Frans Sammut holding Vassalli's collection of Maltese proverbs. December 2006.

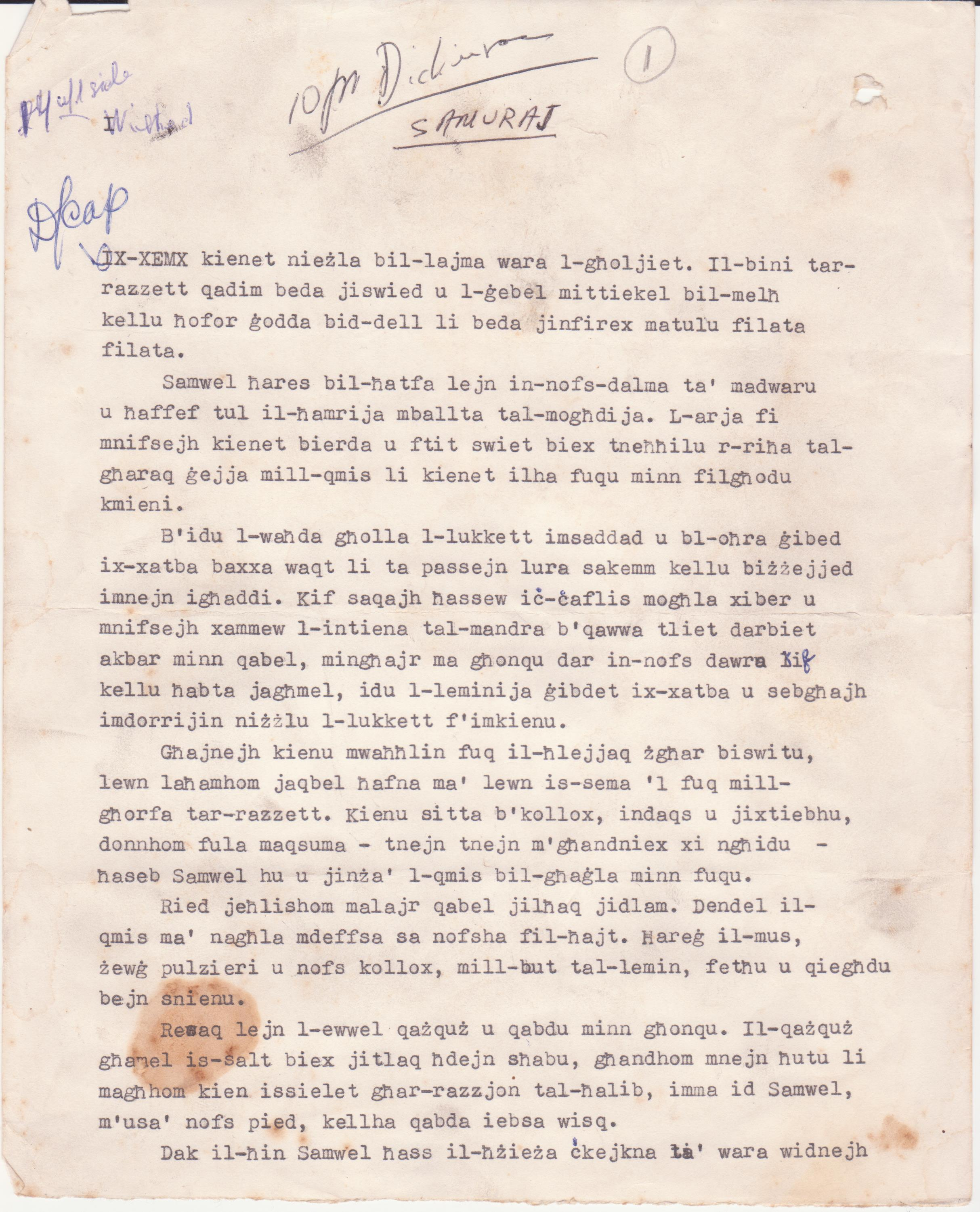
Samuraj, page 1 (original manuscript, Sammut Family Archives)

He published numerous works, including the best-selling novels Il-Gaġġa (The Cage), which was the basis of Gaġġa the 1971 film directed by Mario Philip Azzopardi, aided by Cesare Catania, Samuraj, which won the Rothmans Prize, Paceville, which won the Government's Literary Medal. and Il-Holma Maltija (The Maltese Dream), and won much literary acclaim.

Sammut also published collections of short stories: Labirint (Labyrinth), Newbiet (Seasons), and Hrejjef Zminijietna (Tales of Our Times).

His non-fiction works include Ir-Rivoluzzjoni Franciza: il-Grajja u t-Tifsira (The French Revolution: History and Meaning), Bonaparti f'Malta (Bonaparte in Malta), of which a French translation, Bonaparte à Malte, was published in 2008, and On The Da Vinci Code (2006), a bilingual (English and Maltese) commentary on the international bestseller. He also edited Mikiel Anton Vassalli's Lexicon. In 2006, Sammut's translation of Vassalli's Motti, Aforismi e Proverbii Maltesi was published as Ghajdun il-Ghaqal, Kliem il-Gherf u Qwiel Maltin. In 2007, his Il-Holma Maltija in translation (as La Malta Revo) represented Malta in the Esperanto collection of classic literary works published by Mondial Books of New York. In 2008, his Il-Gagga was published for the fifth time. In 2009, Sammut presented a reinterpretation of Pietru Caxaro's poem "Xidew il-qada" (also known as "Il Cantilena"), the oldest written document in the Maltese language.

Sammut translated important works for theatre: Racine's Phedre (Fedra) (1978) and Maxim Gorki's The Lower Depths, both represented at the Manoel Theatre, under the direction of poet Mario Azzopardi.

Fedra, 1978.

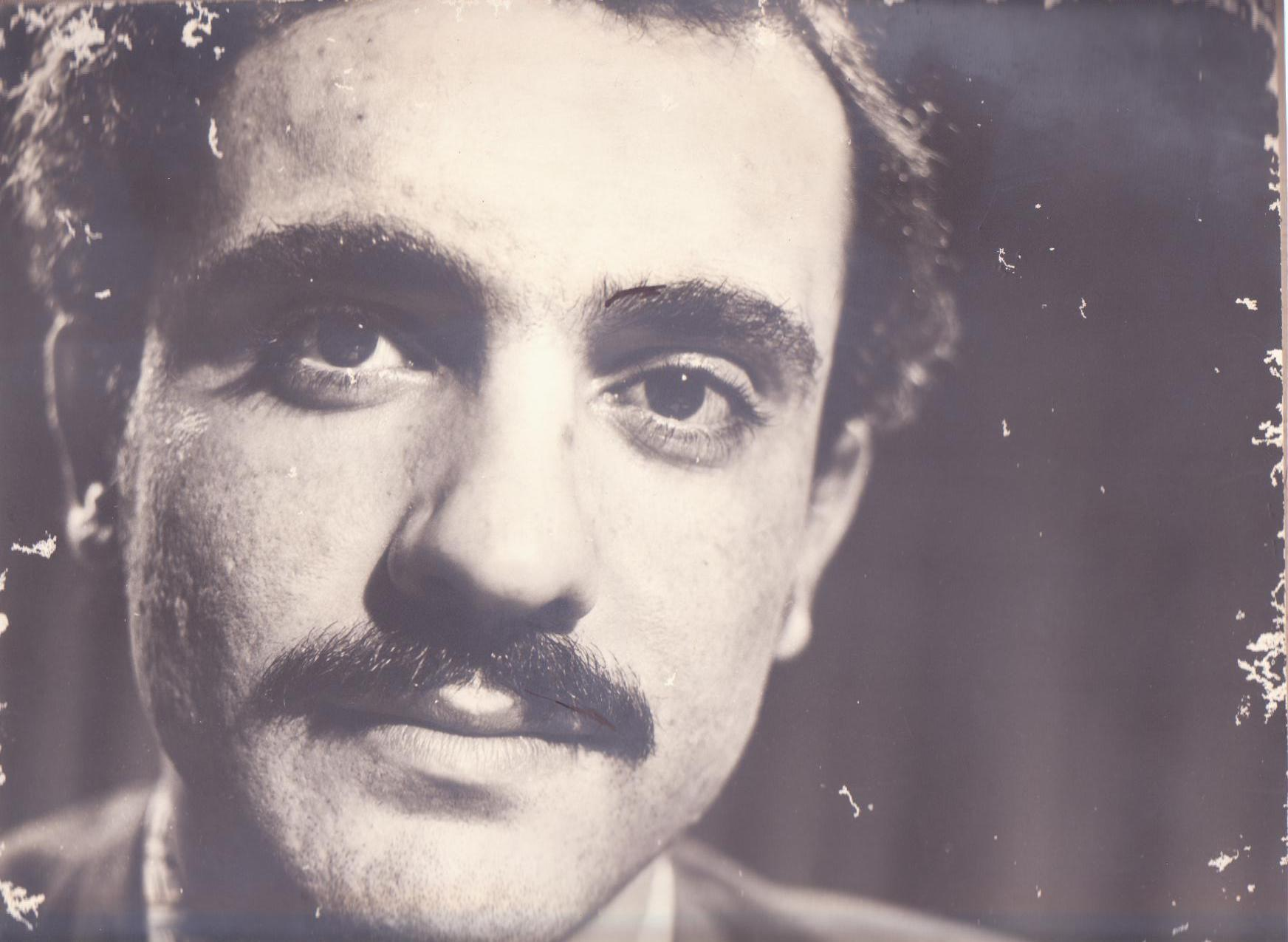
Frans Sammut in the late 1970s

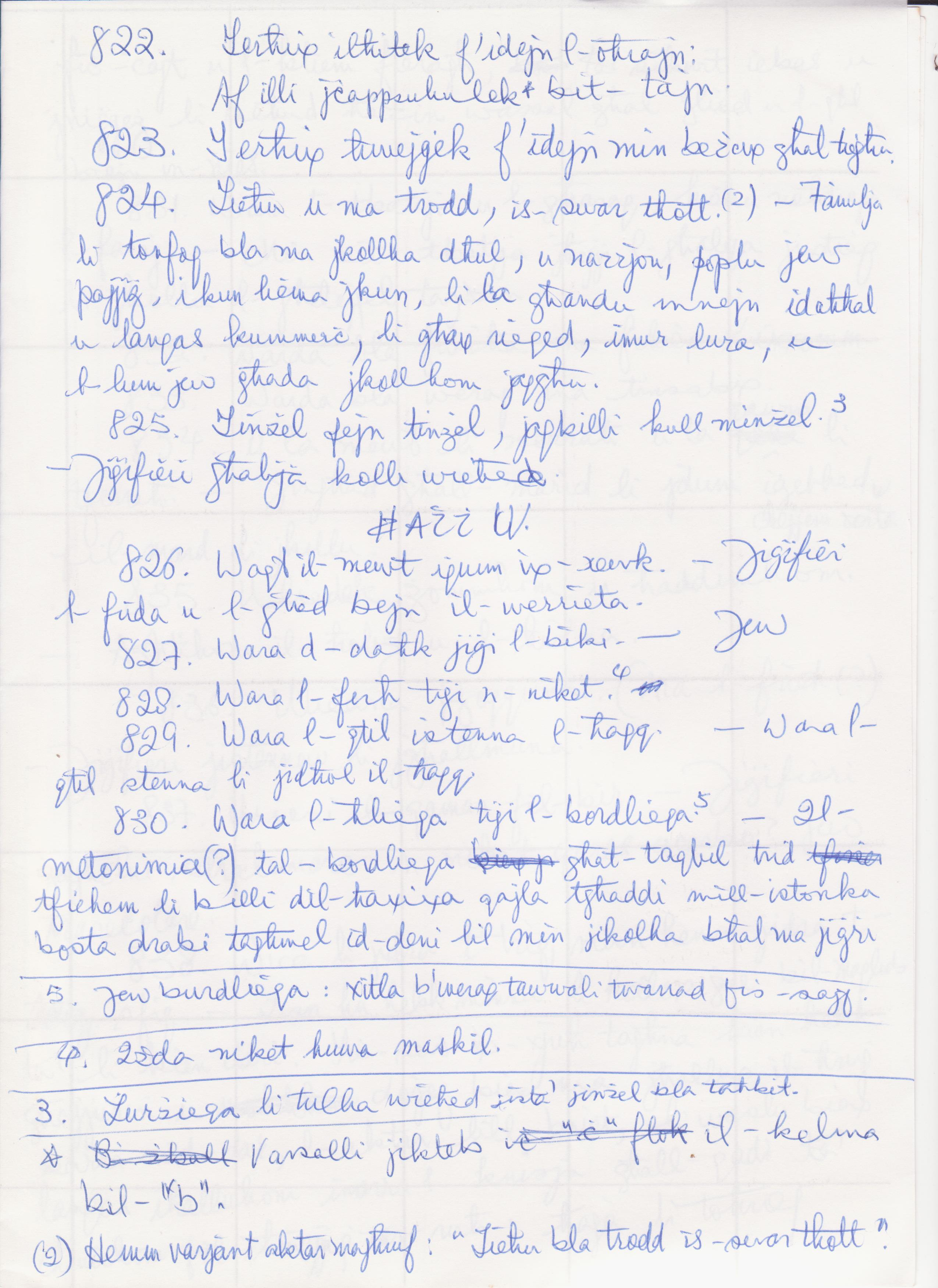
A sheet from the manuscript of Ghajdun il-Ghaqal, archives of the Sammut Family

== Death ==
Frans Sammut died age 66 in hospital. He died unexpectedly from 'natural causes'.

Frans Sammut's last words were: “My wife and I should be going to Jerusalem, but it seems plans have changed. I am now going to the Heavenly Jerusalem."

== National Prize ==
In May of 2014, the Maltese Ministry of Education launched the Frans Sammut Prize for the Maltese Language.

== University textbooks ==
Frans Sammut's novels are studied at the University of Malta.

Numerous theses and papers have been written about his novels.

In 2015, university lecturer in literary Dr Marco Galea wrote that Maltese literature is dominated by Frans Sammut and two others:

"In the case of fiction, the situation is not so straightforward. Immanuel Mifsud, together with the younger Clare Azzopardi, Pierre J. Meilak and Walid Nabhan, have produced ground-breaking works of short fiction, but have so far shied away from tackling the novel. Offerings from other writers in this genre have been few and far between. The upshot is a curious situation where contemporary prose writing in Maltese is dominated by the short form, while the novel continues to be dominated by figures such as Frans Sammut (another member of the Moviment, who died in 2011), Alfred Sant and Trevor Żahra."

== Bibliography ==
- Labirint u Stejjer Oħra [Labyrinth and Other Stories] (short stories) 1968
- Il-Gaġġa [The Cage] 5 editions (novel) 1971 – made into a film, Gaġġa [Cage], directed by Mario Philip Azzopardi 1971 (KKM)
- Logħba Bejn Erbgħa [A Game Between Four People] 1972
- Samuraj [Samurai] 3 editions (novel) 1975 (KKM)
- Kristu fil-Poeżija Maltija 1913-1973 [Christ in Maltese Poetry 1913-1973] (originally a University of Malta dissertation, 1977, eventually published in 2018, large print edition, in the SPPDAA series)
- Fedra [Racine's Phèdre] 1978
- Il-Qtil fi Sqaq il-Ħorr [Murder in Honest Alley] (long short story) 1979 (SKS)
- Il-Proċess Vassalli [The Vassalli Trial] (play) 1980
- Il-Mara tat-Tifel [Translation of D.H. Lawrence's Daughter in Law] (play) 1980
- Il-Mixja tal-Ħaddiem lejn il-Ħelsien [The Worker's March Towards Freedom] (political analysis) 1982 (SKS)
- Ir-Rivoluzzjoni Franċiża: il-Ġrajja u t-Tifsira [The French Revolution: History and Meaning] (history) 1989 (SKS)
- Paceville (novel) 1991 (Merlin)
- Letteratura [Literature] (ed. Toni Cortis) (literary criticism) 1992 (Ministeru tal-Edukazzjoni)
- Il-Ħakma ta' Monroj [Monroy's Rule] (folk opera, libretto) 1993
- Il-Ħolma Maltija [The Maltese Dream] (novel) 1994 (SKS), 2012 translated into Esperanto as La Malta Revo, published in New York, 2007
- Mannarinu! (folk opera, libretto) 1994
- L-Atti tal-Appostli [The Acts of the Apostles] (folk opera, libretto) 1995
- Bonaparti f’Malta [Bonaparte in Malta] (history) 1997 (SKS), translated into French as Bonaparte à Malte, with an introduction by Dr Paul Borg Olivier, 2008 (Argo)
- Newbiet [Seasons] (short stories) 1998 (Illustrations: Giovanni Caselli) (Toni Cortis)
- Ħrejjef Żminijietna [Tales of Our Times] (short stories) 2000 (Illustrations: Giovanni Caselli) (SKS)
- Dun Ġorġ: Il-Bniedem tal-Poplu [Father George: a man of the people] (historical and religious theme) 2001 (SKS)
- Ġrajjet Ħaż-Żebbuġ [A History of Haz-Zebbug] (history) (translation of Dun Salv Ciappara's original) 2001 (Kazin 12 ta' Mejju)
- Lexicon (by Mikiel Anton Vassalli) 2002 (SKS)
- Għala Le għall-UE [Why No to the EU] (political analysis) 2003 (SKS)
- Ħarsa mill-qrib lejn ħajjet San Filep u l-Kult tiegħu [A Close Look at St Philip: His Life and the Devotion Towards Him](historical and religious theme) 2004 (Kazin 12 ta' Mejju)
- Ġrajjet it-Tagħlim f'Malta, Vol. 1 [The History of Education in Malta] (historical) 2004 (Familja Sammut)
- On The Da Vinci Code/Dwar The Da Vinci Code (literary criticism) 2006 (Argo)
- Għajdun il-Għaqal, Kliem il-Għerf u Qwiel Maltin [Maltese Axioms, Aphorisms and Proverbs] (translation of Mikiel Anton Vassalli's original) 2006 (Argo)
- I Giovanniti: La Storia dei Cavalieri di Malta [The History of the Knights of Malta] (history) 2006, published in 2015 (Bonfirraro Editore, Italy)
- Alfred Sant: Il-Viżjoni għall-Bidla [Alfred Sant: a vision for change] (political analysis) 2008 (SKS)
- Introduction to Baron Vincenzo Azopardi's dictionary in which he analyses Caxaro's "Cantilena" (literary criticism, linguistics) 2009 (Ghaqda tal-Malti - Università)
- Cagliostro: La doppia vita e l'intrigo maltese (history) 2017 (posthumous) (Bonfirraro Editore, Italy)
