= J. David Markham =

American historian

- Born: 26 December 1945 (age 80); Austin, Texas
- Occupations: Author, historian, educator
- Spouse: Edna

J. David Markham (born 26 December 1945) is an educator, and historian who specializes in Napoleonic studies. He has been featured on programs on Napoleon Bonaparte and Julius Caesar on the History Channel International, the History Channel, the Military History Channel, the Learning Channel and the Discovery Channel. David is President of the International Napoleonic Society and President Emeritus of the Napoleonic Historical Society. David also served as the resident historian for the Napoleon 101 podcast.

== Early life and education ==
J. David Markham was born in Austin, Texas, on 26 December 1945. He graduated from University High School in 1964. He has a Bachelor of Science degree from the University of Iowa, a Master of Arts degree from the University of Northern Iowa, and a Master of Education degree from Arizona State University.

== Teaching career ==
Markham has taught history and other subjects at the university, college and high school levels. He has taught at two campuses of the University of Wisconsin, at community colleges in Wisconsin, Illinois, Arizona and Florida, and high schools in Arizona, Florida and Washington.

== Works ==
- Imperial Glory: Bulletins of Napoleon's Grande Armée 1805-1814 (2003) (Winner of the 2003 International Napoleonic Society's President's Choice Award).
- Napoleon's Road to Glory: Triumphs, Defeats and Immortality London: Brassey's, 2003 ISBN (Winner of the 2004 Napoleonic Society of America Literary Award).
- Napoleon and Dr Verling on St Helena (2006) (Winner of the 2005 International Napoleonic Society's President's Choice Award).
- Napoleon for Dummies (2005).
- To Befriend an Emperor: Betsy Balcombe's Memoirs of Napoleon on St Helena (2005).
- The Road to St Helena: Napoleon After Waterloo (2008)
- Simply Napoleon (2017)

== The International Napoleonic Society ==
Having previously served as Executive Vice-President and Editor-in-Chief of the International Napoleonic Society, David became President in November 2008 following the death of the society's founder, Ben Weider. A Fellow in the society, he was awarded the Legion of Merit in 1996, one of the first three international scholars to receive that award. Markham has a sizable private collection of Napoleonic snuffboxes, as well as a significant collection of miniatures and engravings. The images used in his books come from his collection which has been featured in several museum exhibitions. He has organized International Napoleonic Congresses in Alessandria, Italy, June 1998, Tel Aviv, Israel, July 1999; Tbilisi, Republic of Georgia June 2000; Dinard, France, July 2005; Slupsk, Poland, 2007; Israel, 2007; Corsica/Elba, 2008; Montreal, Canada 2009; San Anton, Malta, 2010, Den Helder, The Netherlands, 2011, Moscow, Russia, 2012, Toronto, Canada, 2013, Havana, Cuba, 2014, Brussels, Belgium, 2015, Dublin, Ireland, 2016, Trier, Germany, 2017, Vienna, Austria, 2018 and Grenoble, France, 2019. Future Congresses are planned for Warsaw, Athens, Cork and Acre.

== The Mexico-France Napoleonic-Institute ==
He has been appointed as Councilor for the English-speaking countries for The Mexico-France Napoleonic-Institute, contributing to the success of the international historic and literary contest Count of Las Cases Memorial Prize, an award that he won in 2007.

== Honors ==
He has received the following honors for his work as an educator and historian:

- Chevalier dans l'Ordre des Palmes académiques (Knight of the Order of the French Academic Palms)
- Médaille d'or du Rayonnement Culturel (Gold Medal for Cultural Influence), La Renaissance française (an international French cultural organization with the high patronage of the French President and the ministries of Foreign Affairs, Interior, Defense and National Education)
- Fellow, International Napoleonic Society
- Legion of Merit, International Napoleonic Society, 1996
- Marengo Medal (Province of Alessandria, Italy), 1997
- President's Medal, Napoleonic Alliance, 1998
- Honorary Member, Institute on Napoleon and the French Revolution
- Member of the "La Vieja Guardia", Instituto Napoleónico México-Francia
- Count of Las Cases Memorial Prize medal for the best International book in English, Instituto Napoleónico México-Francia, 2007
- Medal of the City of Ajaccio (Capital of Corsica, France), 1997
- Medal of the City of Ajaccio, (Capital of Corsica, France), 2008
- Medal of the General Council of Southern Corsica, 2008
- Medal of the Territorial Collective of Corsica, 2008
- First French Alliance Special Service Award, Alliance Française of Greater Phoenix, 1992
- Medal of the Landtag [State Legislature] of Baden-Württemberg, Germany, 1987

== See also ==
- Napoleon I of France bibliography
