= Mario de Marco =

Maltese politician (born 1965)

The Honourable Mario de Marco MP
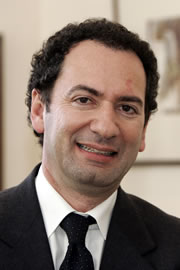

Minister for Tourism, The Environment and Culture
- In office 6 January 2012 – 10 March 2013

Parliamentary Secretary for Tourism, The Environment and Culture
- In office 12 March 2008 – 6 January 2012

Member of Parliament for Malta
- In office 12 April 2003 – 27 April 2026

Personal details
- Born: 18 October 1965 (age 60) Malta
- Party: Partit Nazzjonalista
- Spouse: Sharon
- Children: Andrea and Luca

Mario de Marco (born 18 October 1965) is a Maltese politician and academic currently serving as a Member of Parliament. He is the son of former president Guido de Marco and is a former deputy leader for parliamentary affairs of the Nationalist Party.

== Academic career ==
De Marco studied at St Aloysius' College and at Cambridge University, United Kingdom, where he graduated in international commercial law.

While there he was nominated a Commonwealth Scholar for Academic Achievement. As well as specializing in commercial law he also specialized in fundamental human rights. He is commercial law lecturer at the University of Malta.

== Member of Parliament ==
In the 2003-2008 parliamentary term, he was nominated as vice-chairman of the Parliamentary House Committee in the House of Representatives. He is also a member of the Parliamentary Committee for European and Foreign Affairs.

Following the March 2008 general election, he was appointed as member of the Cabinet, as Parliamentary Secretary for Tourism, within Prime Minister Lawrence Gonzi's office. In January 2012, he was appointed Minister responsible for Environment, Tourism and Culture.

In the March 2013 general election he was re-elected to parliament and was made the Nationalist deputy leader for parliamentary affairs in May that year.

Professional Career

Mario de Marco graduated as Doctor of Laws from the University of Malta 1988. He furthered his studies and obtained a Master of Laws degree (LL.M.) from the University of Cambridge, Trinity Hall. He is a lecturer in commercial law with special focus on international business law at the University of Malta. He also lectures on international trade transactions at the Link Campus in Rome, Italy.

Mario's practice is focused on the areas of international commercial and trade law in Malta, Europe and North Africa. He has acted as legal counsel to a major Italian communication company in a bid to enter into a strategic partnership agreement with the government of Malta for the design, development, implementation and operation of the e-Government services initiative. He has also advised a number of blue chip companies in the telecommunication sectors and has represented international corporations in dispute resolution proceedings both locally and in London.

Mario is also the legal advisor to various hotel-owning and -operating companies in Malta and to various companies involved in the construction industry as well as major schools, and a number of joint-venture companies between Maltese Government and Libyan Government.
