= Bernard Grech =

Maltese politician and lawyer (born 1971)

Honourable Bernard Grech MP
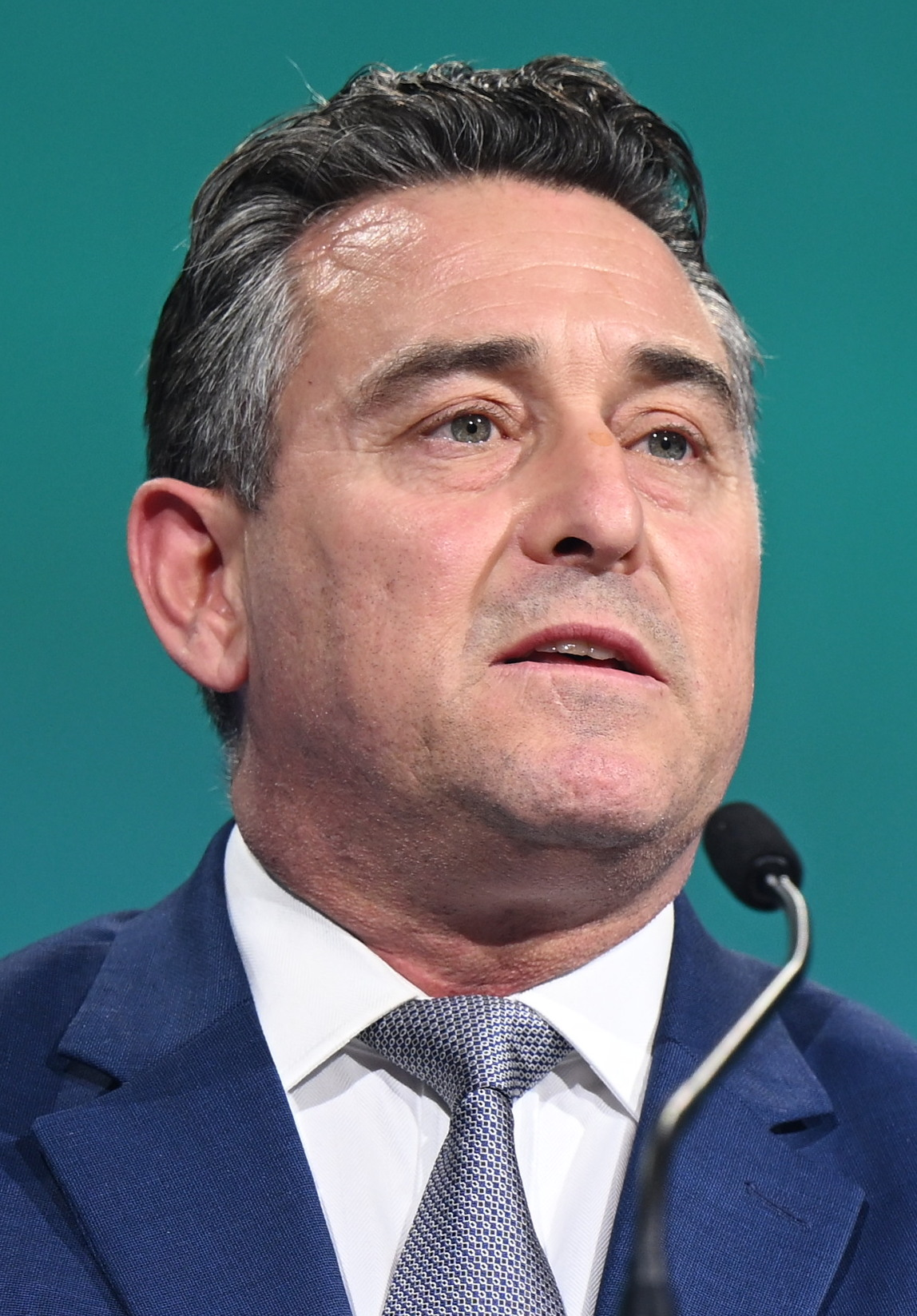
- Grech in 2022

Deputy Speaker of the House of Representatives
- Incumbent
- Assumed office 20 June 2026
- Speaker: Carmelo Abela
- Preceded by: David Agius

Leader of the Opposition
- In office 7 October 2020 – 10 September 2025
- President: George Vella; Myriam Spiteri Debono
- Prime Minister: Robert Abela
- Preceded by: Adrian Delia
- Succeeded by: Alex Borg

Leader of the Nationalist Party
- In office 3 October 2020 – 7 September 2025
- Deputy: Robert Arrigo; Alex Perici Calascione
- Preceded by: Adrian Delia
- Succeeded by: Alex Borg

Member of Parliament
- Incumbent
- Assumed office 6 October 2020
- Constituency: Ninth District (2020-2022); Eleventh District (2022-)

Personal details
- Born: 8 June 1971 (age 55) Paola, Malta
- Spouse: AnneMarie Grech (m. 1997)
- Relations: Edwin Grech (uncle); Karin Grech (cousin)
- Children: 2
- Education: University of Malta

Bernard Grech MP (born 8 June 1971) is a Maltese politician and lawyer who was the leader of the Nationalist Party and the Leader of the Opposition from 2020 until 2025.

== Early and professional life ==
Grech was born on 8 June 1971, in Paola to John and Frida Grech. He grew up in Birżebbuġa and he graduated as a lawyer, focusing on civil law. Grech practiced his professional activity in two law firms, specializing in the mediation of family disputes.

== Political career ==
=== Initial involvement in politics ===
In 2011, Grech took part in the campaign, which was later lost, against the legalization of divorce in Malta. He served as the spokesman for Moviment Żwieġ Bla Divorzju (Marriage Without Divorce Movement).

In 2018, news portal MaltaToday reported that Grech was offered to a candidacy in the upcoming 2019 European Parliament elections but he was non-committal. Grech ultimately didn't run in the elections.

While officially involved until then in active roles in politics, he got closer to the positions of the Nationalist Party in 2018. He topped a trust barometer survey, beating MEP Roberta Metsola and then-leader Adrian Delia. In August 2020 he stood against the Delia after the party congress voted to hold a new leadership contest.

=== Leader of the Opposition (2020-2025) ===
Grech became the leader of the Nationalist Party on 3 October 2020, winning the election against incumbent Adrian Delia with 69.3% of the votes. He was sworn in as Leader of the Opposition on 7 October.

==== General Elections 2022 ====
A year and a half after his appointment, the Nationalist Party faced their first elections under the leadership of Bernard Grech. In the 2022 General Elections, the Labour Party (PL) under Robert Abela obtained 162,707 votes; 39,474 more than Grech's Nationalist Party (PN) which obtained 123,233 votes; and as percentages the PL earned 55.1% and the PN 42.1%, almost a repeat of the same results as the previous two elections. It was Malta's biggest electoral victory and the biggest defeat for the Nationalist Party since Independence to date.

Comparing the general election with the 2017 election, one also finds that the Labour Party reduced its votes by 8,269 votes, while the Nationalist Party reduced the votes by 12,464 votes.

==== Vitals Global Healthcare Case ====
In 2015, a deal was signed between the Maltese Government and Vitals Global Healthcare that granted a concession to Vitals to run three hospitals, St Luke's Hospital, Karin Grech Hospital and the Gozo General Hospital. In 2018 Adrian Delia, then leader of the Opposition, had filed the case against the Prime Minister, Vitals Global Healthcare, the Attorney General, the CEO of Malta Industrial Parks Limited and the chairman of the Board of Governors of the Lands Authority in a bid to force the cancellation of the 99-year concession agreement. The cancellation was requested on the basis that the concessionaires, both Vitals Global Healthcare and Steward Healthcare, had not fulfilled their contractual obligations. Adrian Delia won the case with Judge Francesco Depasquale ruled that Steward and Vitals were fraudulent and the Hospitals were transferred back to the state. This case resulted in one of the worst polling results for Robert Abela's Labour Party thus increasing the popularity of Bernard Grech's Nationalist Party as for the first time since 2013, the result of the Poll was within the Margin of Error.

==== Resignation ====
On 10 June 2025, Grech announced his resignation as Leader of the Nationalist Party and Leader of the Opposition, effective as soon as his successor is elected following an internal leadership contest. His resignation came two days after the MaltaToday released the results of a survey placing voting intentions for the Partit Nazzjonalista at 39.7% to the Partit Laburista's 53.3%, with Grech's trust rating at a staggering 18.8% to Prime Minister Robert Abela's 50%.

Grech was succeeded as party leader and Leader of the opposition by Alex Borg.

=== Post-leadership (2025-) ===
Grech was appointed to Borg's first shadow cabinet in September 2025 as Shadow Minister for Capital Projects and Infrastructure, which was previously held by Joe Giglio.

== Personal life ==
Grech declares himself a practicing Catholic; he also expressed opinions against the legalization of abortion. In his private life he has an interest in opera.

Grech is married to AnneMarie, a teacher. The couple started dating in January 1991 and married on 8 September 1997. They have two children together, a son Neil and a daughter Maria, and reside in Mosta.

Grech's father John died on 18 September 2022 at the age of 90, while his mother, Frida, died in January 2023.
