= Alex Borg (politician) =

Maltese lawyer and politician (born 1995)

Honourable Alex Borg MP
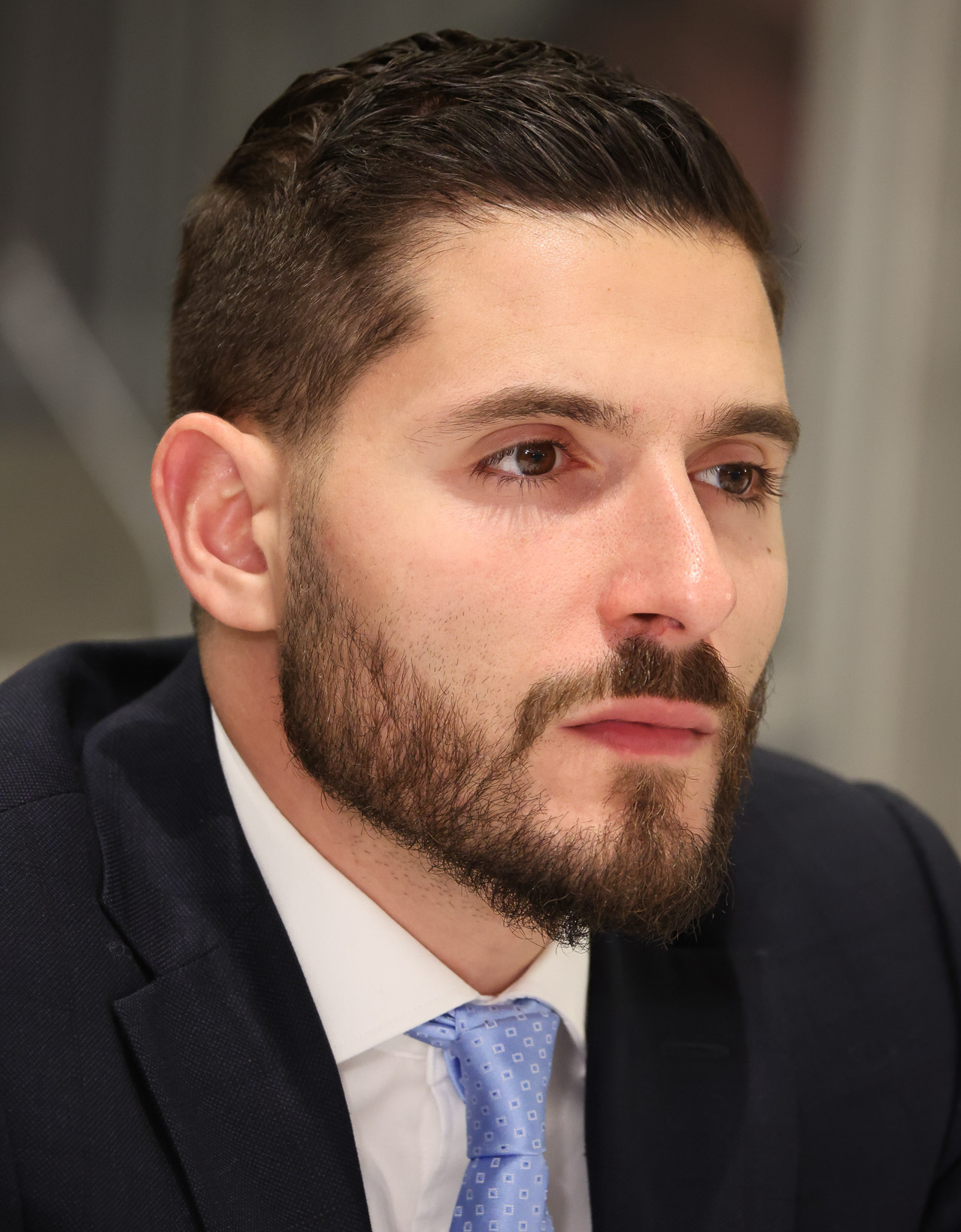
- Borg in December 2025

Leader of the Opposition
- Incumbent
- Assumed office 10 September 2025
- President: Myriam Spiteri Debono
- Prime Minister: Robert Abela
- Preceded by: Bernard Grech

Leader of the Nationalist Party
- Incumbent
- Assumed office 7 September 2025
- Deputy: Alex Perici Calascione
- Preceded by: Bernard Grech

Member of Parliament
- Incumbent
- Assumed office 7 May 2022
- Constituency: Thirteenth District

Personal details
- Born: Alexander Borg; 10 July 1995 (age 31)
- Party: Nationalist
- Domestic partner: Sarah Bajada
- Education: University of Malta

Alexander Borg MP (born 10 July 1995) is a Maltese lawyer, politician and model who has served as leader of the Nationalist Party since September 2025. Borg was elected as a Member of Parliament in 2022. In April 2022, he was appointed shadow minister for Gozo.

== Early life ==
Borg was born in Victoria, Gozo. He is the son of Mary Debono Borg and Tony Borg, who served as chief of staff to former Minister for Gozo Giovanna Debono.

He completed his legal studies at the University of Malta and has been a practicing lawyer since 2019.

== Political career ==
In November 2020, Borg was elected to the MZPN's executive committee, to serve as Gozo Coordinator in the MZPN's executive committee. In July 2021, Borg was elected as a member of the Nationalist Party's Executive Committee. Borg was elected to the House of Representatives in March 2022.

=== Opposition leader ===
==== Early leadership speculation ====
From his early career as an MP, Borg was tipped as a potential future leader for the party. In April 2022, a Malta Today survey found that around 70% of PN councillors want Grech to remain as leader. Borg was mentioned as an alternative candidate, as well as Franco Debono, Joe Giglio, Roberta Metsola, and Adrian Delia. Borg stated that he will not run for PN leader at that moment, but does not rule out a future bid.

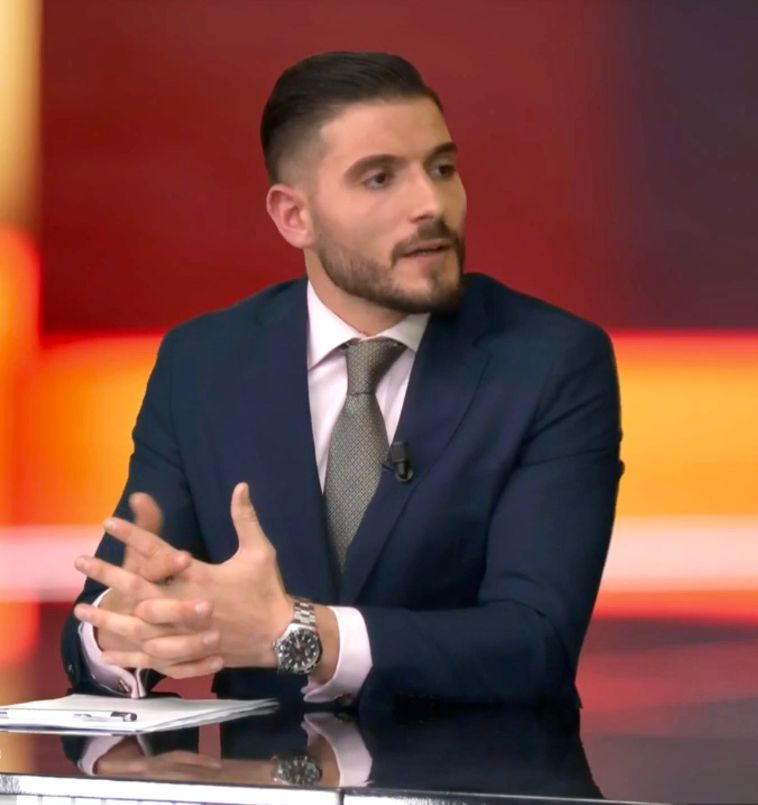
Borg in a televised debate in 2023

During an edition of TVM’s Ħadt l-Aħbar, one of Malta’s most renowned political pundits, architect Robert Musumeci, has endorsed Borg as a future leader of the Nationalist Party.

Borg played down suggestions by the Prime Minister Robert Abela that he intends to "dethrone" Bernard Grech as PN leader. Borg said he suspects Abela kept mentioning him during his Parliament speech because the Prime Minister is bothered by his successful work in Gozo.

In February 2024, Borg made it to the front page of local newspaper Illum, whereby he was mentioned as a potential leader of the Nationalist Party, following the European Parliament Elections in June 2024.

==== 2025 PN leadership election ====
Following Bernard Grech's resignation as leader of the Nationalist Party in June 2025, leaked internal PN surveys put Borg as the top choice. Former leader Adrian Delia announced his candidacy for leadership the same month with Borg's backing. Just 24 hours later, Borg announced his intent to run for the post.

The election was held on 6 September. Early the next day, Borg announced his victory, though the PN Electoral Commission insisted the race was too close to call. The Electoral Commission formally confirmed Borg as leader at 04:00AM, beating Delia on a razor-thin majority of 44 votes. He was sworn in as Leader of the Opposition by President Myriam Spiteri Debono on 10 September.

==== 2026 general election ====
Prime minister Robert Abela called a snap election on the 27th of April 2026, following tensions in the Middle East. Borg quickly responded through a video on social media where he stated that he is ready to win. Shortly after, the Nationalist Party announced that their slogan would be "Nifs Ġdid" (new breath), signalling change to Malta's politics. Borg also declared that he would be running on the 12th and 13th districts, signalling return to his Gozitan roots.

Most of the Nationalist Party proposals are centred around health, with Borg announcing a €600 million investment in the construction of new hospitals, a €300 grant for smart watches and a "Digital Front Door" which plans to bring data into a single, usable platform. In a conference on Worker's day, Borg proposed that 18th century villa, Selmun Palace would be renovated to become a 'National Health Village', preventing conditions such as diabetes, heart disease, obesity and mental health problems, while also serving as a 60-bed rehabilitation centre.

The Nationalist party lost the general election, achieving 44.68% of the votes compared to Labour's 51.77%, however compared to the 2022 election, the gap between the parties shrunk to 21,721 votes. Alex Borg was the most voted candidate, receiving 21,825 first-count votes between both districts.

== Electoral record ==
Borg ran on the 13th District during the 2022 Maltese General Election. He obtained 6,108 first preference votes, beating some incumbent and high-ranking politicians in his own party and getting the highest number of first preference votes across all the districts after Party Leader Bernard Grech.

== Views ==
Ideologically, Borg has been described as a conservative, but he describes himself as centre-right who agrees with some socialist principles such as "bolstering social services, the welfare state, free healthcare and education". In April 2025, Borg and fellow PN MP Eve Borg Bonello attended the Alliance for Responsible Citizenship conference on the invitation of British peer David Alton. The two posted a photo on social media with British Conservative Party leader Kemi Badenoch.

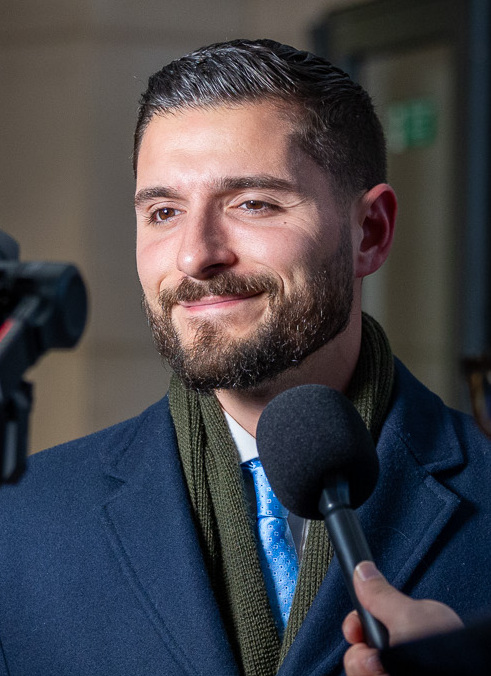
Borg in Brussels in December 2025

=== Repubblika ===
In August 2021, local NGO Repubblika demanded an apology from Borg. The incident followed the Civil Society Network NGO asking social media users whether they would rather see the Nationalist Party replaced by a new political party. In a Facebook post, Borg condemned both non-governmental organisations and "completely disassociated" himself "from entities like these, whose main goal goes beyond the principles and values of our glorious party."

Repubblika's president Robert Aquilina demanded an immediate apology.

=== Franco Debono comeback ===
In January 2024, Borg endorsed a political comeback for Franco Debono, stating that he would like to see him more “active within the PN’s structures”. Debono was a one-time PN MP who became disgruntled with the party, voting against the 2013 budget, effectively bringing down Lawrence Gonzi's government.

=== Euthanasia ===
Borg stated that if elected leader, he would allow a free vote to Nationalist MPs on a euthanasia bill.

=== Abortion ===
Borg opposes abortion and believes in the value of life from conception until death. However he suggested that party members who favour abortion could still be tolerated within the PN and would “not be completely sidelined,” provided they adhere to the party’s core values and statute, which explicitly include opposing abortion in all circumstances. In February 2026, Borg stated that he only agreed with the imprisonment of women who get abortions on a case-by-case basis.

=== Donald Trump ===
When asked by Lovin Malta in February 2024 who he would vote for between Joe Biden or Donald Trump in the 2024 United States presidential election, Borg endorsed Trump as he is "more pro-business". In a March 2025 interview, Borg praised Trump for his pro-life stance and his "authentic" rhetoric and campaign style, while criticising his administration for threatening the EU with tariffs on imported alcohol.

== Controversy ==
In May 2025, Borg was found to have breached ethics by the Commissioner for Standards in Public Life, after he made misleading statements about the restoration of Fort Chambray by claiming the state would not need to shoulder the cost of the bastion restoration and was asked to issue a written apology. Borg refused to apologise and the case was referred to parliamentary standards committee.

== Personal life ==
Borg was raised in Nadur, Gozo and is currently living in Fontana, Gozo. He received his primary education at the Bishop's Conservatory School, secondary education at the Gozo College Secondary School, and attended sixth form at Sir M. A. Refalo in Victoria, Gozo.

Borg is a model and in 2020 won the Mr World Malta title.

He has been in a relationship with TV presenter Sarah Bajada since before February 2024.
