= St Aloysius' College (Malta) =

School in Birkirkara, Malta

St Aloysius College

Location
- Birkirkara, Balzan Malta; 35.895979°N 14.460183°E

Information
- Type: Catholic Primary, Secondary and Post-secondary education institution
- Motto: Men and Women for Others
- Religious affiliation: Roman Catholic (Jesuit)
- Established: 1907; 119 years ago
- Founder: Society of Jesus
- Oversight: Society of Jesus
- Chairman: Rev. Fr Michael Bugeja SJ
- Director: Edwin Ungaro (acting)
- Head: Daniela Camilleri Sacco (Head of Primary School); Edwin Ungaro (Head of Secondary School); Gabriella Abela (Head of Sixth Form)
- Staff: ~300
- Gender: Mixed primary, secondary and sixth form
- Age range: 5-18
- Enrolment: ~1500
- Houses: 3
- Color: Blue - Green - Red
- Alumni: Old Aloysians
- Website: staloysius.edu.mt
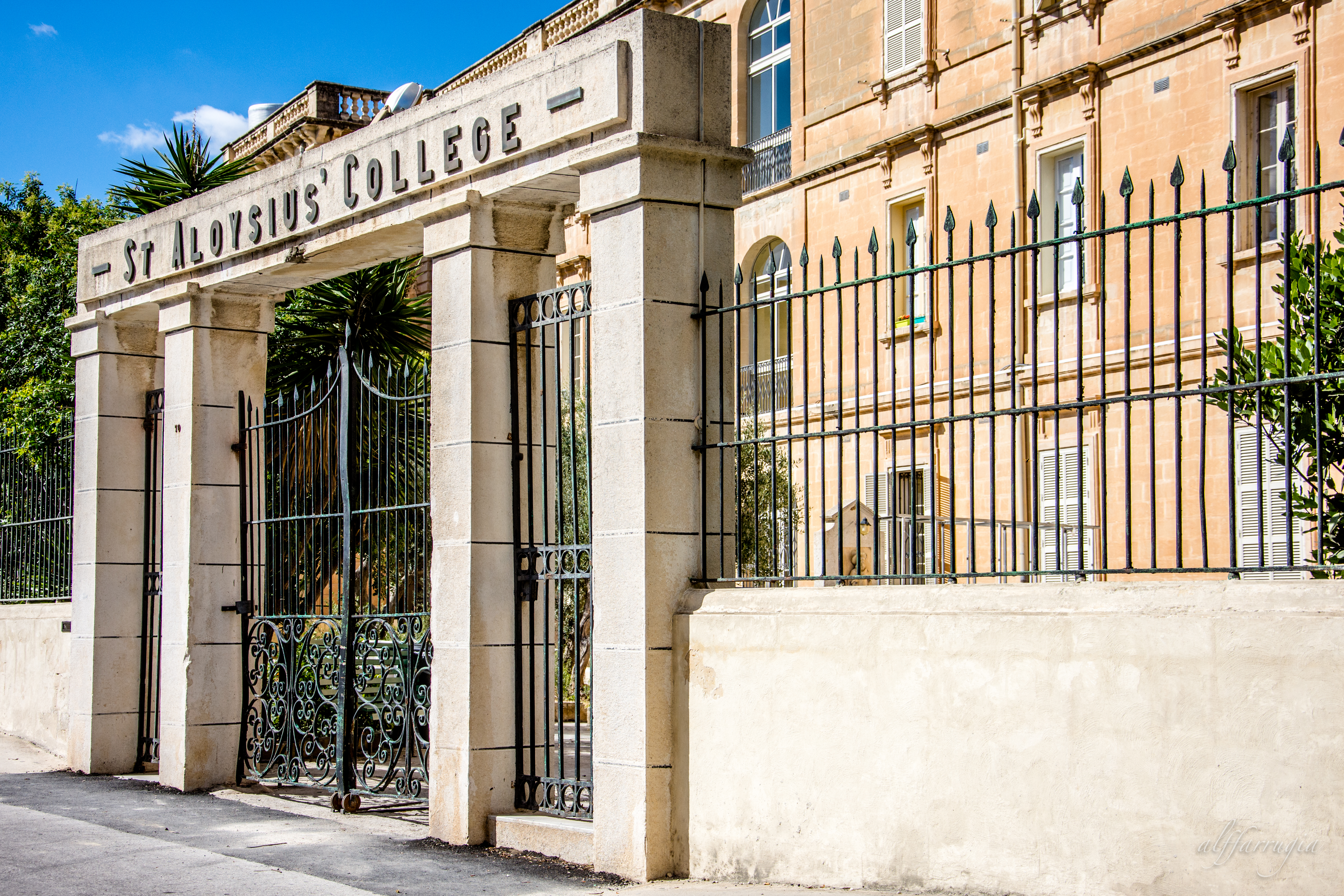
- Old main entrance to the Secondary School

St Aloysius College (SAC) is a Catholic primary, secondary and post-secondary education institution run by the Euro-Mediterranean Province of the Society of Jesus in Birkirkara, Malta. It was founded by the Jesuits in 1907 to complement the seminaries and tertiary institutions already in existence on the island. Today, it comprises a coeducational primary school, boys' secondary school, and a coeducational sixth form. The college compound also houses its own church (dedicated to the Sacred Heart of Jesus) which is used by the college community and open to the public, as well as a Sports and Recreational Complex.

== History ==
In October 1907, the Jesuits, at the request of Pope Pius X, founded St Aloysius College at Birkirkara, in the building which presently houses the secondary school. The college opened with 64 boarders, 56 day boys, and 30 externs. Today, the student population is just over 1500.

The college was originally built in 1896 to house young Jesuits in their formative years. However, in 1905 the novices and other scholastics were transferred to Sicily and the building remained vacant for a while.

It served as a hospital for Allied soldiers during the Second World War.

== Primary school ==
The primary school was originally Stella Maris School, a separate school founded by the Franciscan Missionaries of Mary, and has been incorporated into the college: boys (and in the coming years also girls) can attend the school from kindergarten through to sixth form.

Students are admitted to the Primary School in Kindergarten 2 or Prep 1 through the ballot system, and move on directly to secondary education after Prep 6.

=== Students' council ===
Established in 2016, the Primary School has its own Students' council, with elections held in October each year. Only students from Prep 3 to Prep 6 are eligible to run. The council has 15 members, with one student representing each class. The council organises various activities throughout the scholastic year and introduces new initiatives facilitated by the school administration.

== Secondary school ==
The secondary school is located on Old Railway Road (Triq il-Ferrovija l-Qadima), Birkirkara. It is three storeys high with another storey underground, and incorporates a small inner ground and a large hall which serves as a theatre for cultural events held at the college. Such events include the Sixth Form's Soirée, the Secondary School Concert, Talent Nights, and the celebration of other feast days in the Jesuit calendar. The college celebrated its centenary in the scholastic year 2007–2008.

The theatre's stage has been refurbished, and the under-stage area professionally upgraded to include modern bathroom facilities, designated make-up spaces, and all-new electrical supplies.

The college is equipped with science laboratories (for physics, chemistry, and biology), computer laboratories, an engineering laboratory, a hospitality/food laboratory, as well as four chapels. The chapels are dedicated to Francis Xavier, one of the three most important Jesuit saints, with another being dedicated to the college's patron saint St. Aloysius Gonzaga and La Storta Chapel, a unique chapel in itself.

=== Students' council ===
The Secondary School also has a Students' Council with members elected annually and all students eligible. It has ten members, two from each form. Its president spans fourth/fifth form. The council is responsible for most school events, including the organisation of casual days and fundraising activities, among others.

== The Sports Complex ==
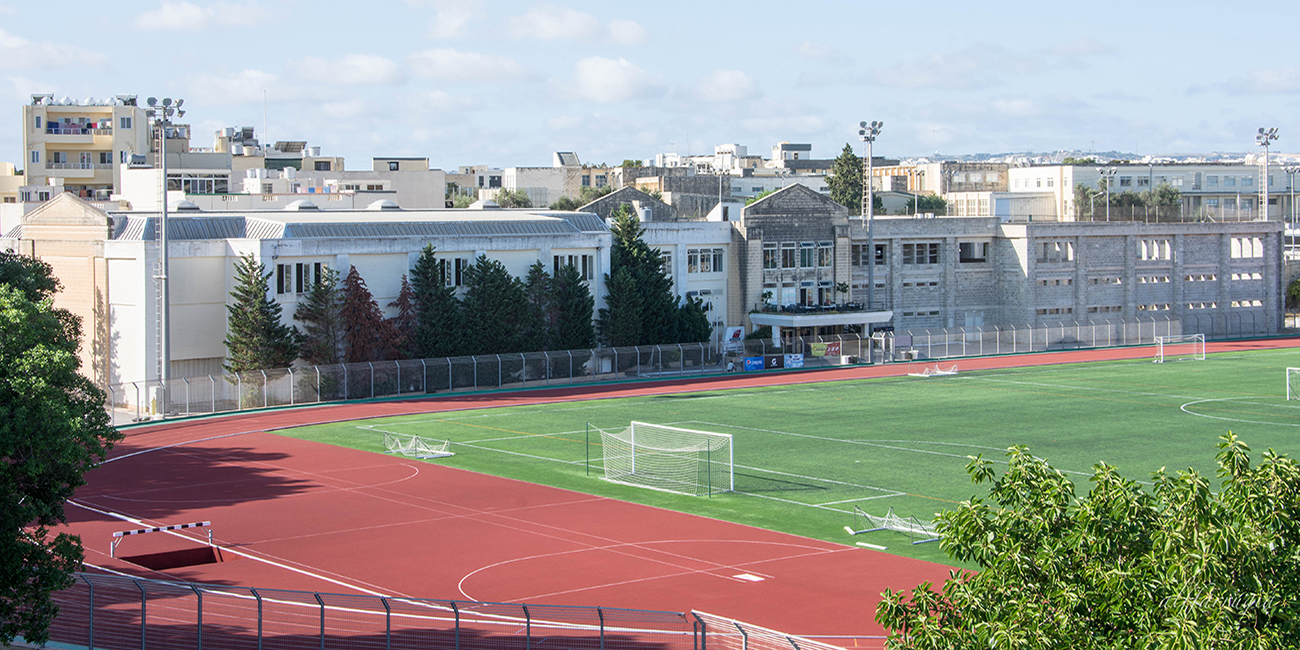
The sports complex grounds

The college's Sports and Recreational Complex includes:

- Health and fitness centre
- 11-a-side FIFA approved synthetic football pitch
- Six-lane IAAF approved athletics track
- Indoor multi-purpose pavilion for handball, volleyball, netball, basketball, badminton and futsal
- Aerobics/dance studios
- Physiotherapy Room
- Conference Room
- Cafeteria
- Two outdoor tennis courts

== The Sixth Form ==
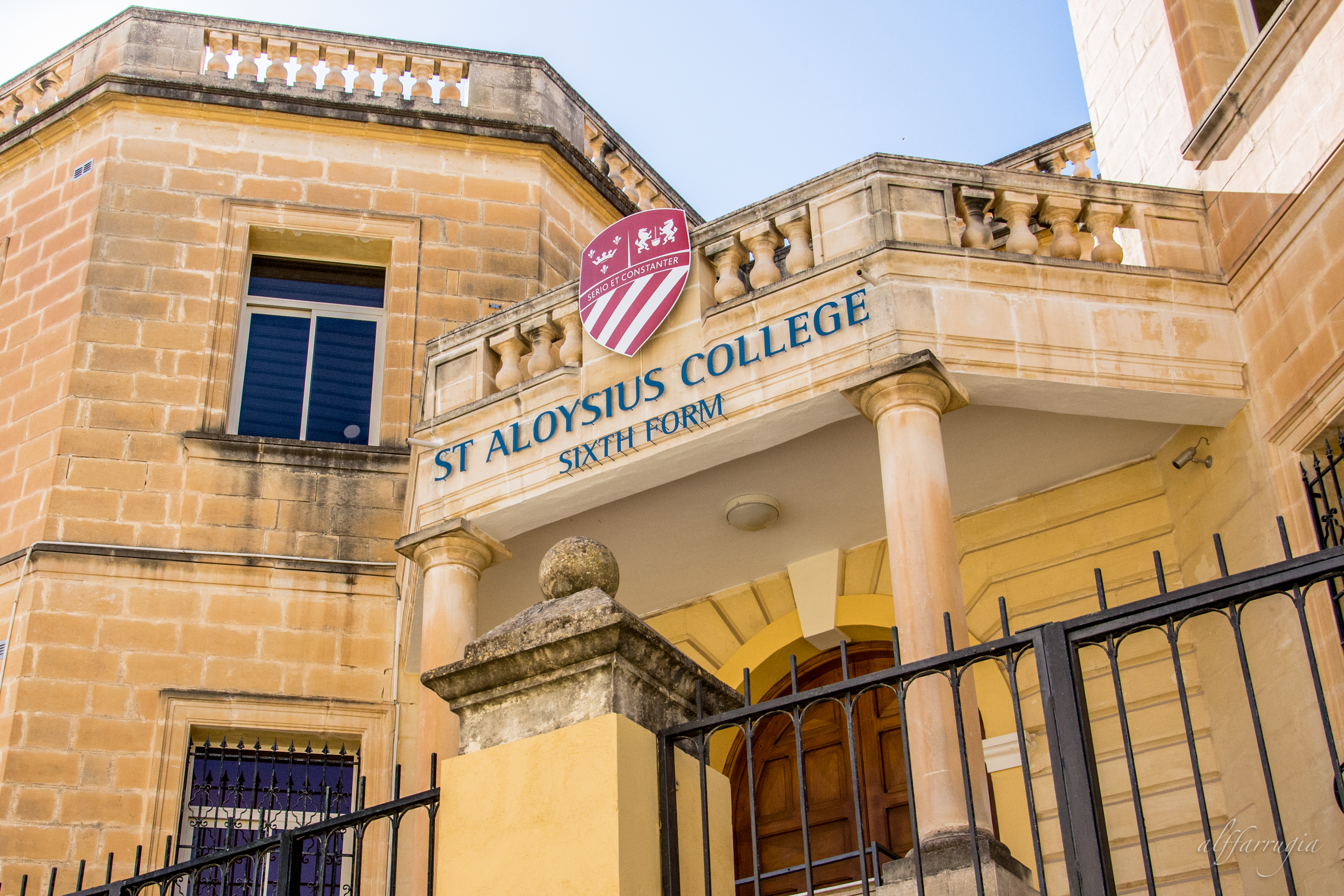
The Sixth Form façade

St Aloysius College Sixth Form has been in existence for the best part of 30 years. It offers four major courses – science, maths, commerce, and arts – each requiring about two years. There are two classes each for maths and commerce; three each for arts and science. The college annually accepts around 260 new students who have passed the core O Level subjects. Facilities include biology, chemistry, physics, and computer laboratories, a media room, library, and assembly hall.

Among the many public annual events hosted by the Sixth Form, its Soiree in early February is most popular. It includes a variety of performing arts; dancing, acting, singing, and music; and concludes with a 45-minute musical directed and choreographed by the students themselves.

Another public event hosted by the Sixth Form is the annual musical concert 'Amplified', held in mid-December. During the event, students perform a variety of singing and dance items aimed at strengthening community spirit.

=== The Sixth Form students' council ===
The Sixth Form has its own Students' Council, with elections held in early November. Since 2012, the Council includes four students from the lower and upper years, with the president from the upper. The council is responsible for coordinating and liaising with the school administration and for organising most Sixth Form events, and has an important say in the Soirée.

== Saturday schooling ==
From its inception in 1907, St Aloysius College never held classes on Wednesday but instead on Saturday morning, making it the only school in Malta to do so. On October 13, 2006, a decision was made by Maltese Jesuit Provincial Paul Chetcuti and college rector Patrick Magro to replace Saturdays with Wednesdays to conform to the practice of other schools. In the view of some, this deprived St. Aloysius' College of its uniqueness. The change took effect in September 2007, with St Aloysius' sixth form also conforming to the practice of fellow sixth forms: De La Salle College (Malta), Junior College (Msida), Giovanni Curmi Higher Secondary School (Naxxar), and the new St. Martin's College Sixth Form (Swatar - Msida) which opened in September 2007.

== Extra-curricular activities ==
All students are encouraged to participate in extracurricular activities, which include:

- Subsonic
- Amplified
- Secondary School Talent Night
- Charity work
- Annual Soirée
- Model European Parliament (MEP) by Aġenżija Żgħażagħ
- NSTF Mini European Assembly
- EuroScola

- President's Award
- Public Debating Activities (e.g., BCA Speak Your Mind competition & Science Forum)
- Young Enterprise Scheme
- Young Scientist competition
- FestAlwigi (formerly known as SACFest)
- Music festival
- After School Sports

The college also has its own Scout group, one of the oldest established on the island, having formed in 1916.

== Notable alumni ==
=== Presidents ===
- Roberta Metsola - President of the European Parliament (2022-)
- Anthony Mamo - President Emeritus of Malta, (1974–1976)
- Anton Buttiġieġ - President Emeritus of Malta, (1976–1981)
- Ċensu Tabone - President Emeritus of Malta, pioneer in the international effort to eradicate trachoma (1989–1994)
- Ugo Mifsud Bonnici - President Emeritus of Malta (1994–1999) and former Cabinet Minister
- Guido de Marco - President Emeritus of Malta (1999–2004)
- Edward Fenech Adami - President Emeritus of Malta (2004-2009) and former Prime Minister of Malta (1987-1996, 1998-2004)

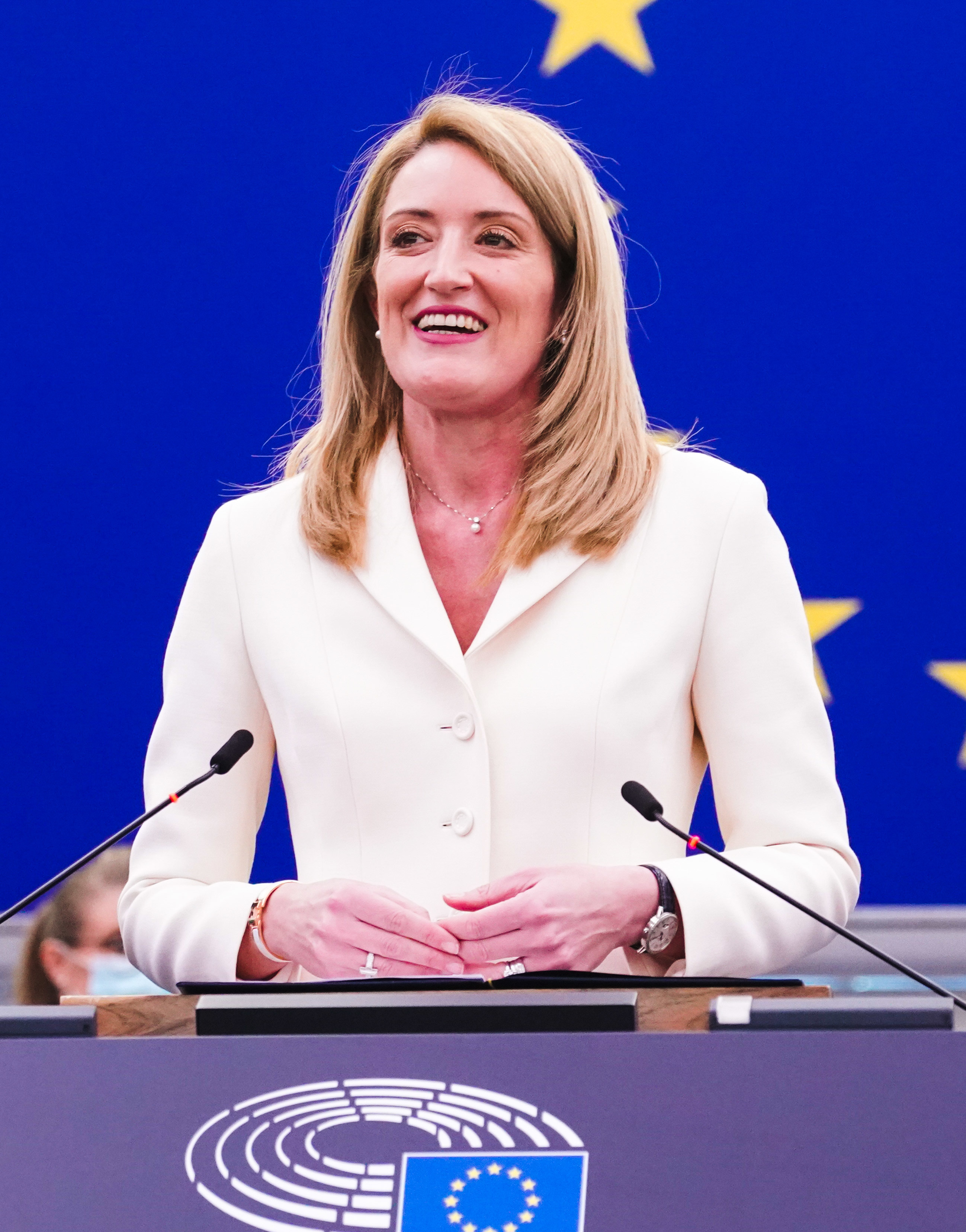
President of the European Parliament Roberta Metsola

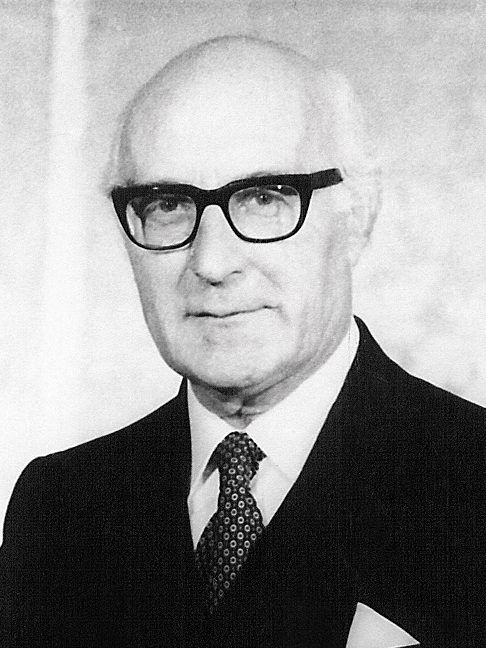
Sir Anthony Mamo

=== Prime Ministers ===
- Edward Fenech Adami - President Emeritus of Malta (2004-2009) and former Prime Minister of Malta (1987-1996, 1998-2004)
- Lawrence Gonzi - former Prime Minister of Malta (2004-2013)
- Joseph Muscat - former Prime Minister of Malta (2013-2020), former Member of the European Parliament
- Robert Abela - incumbent Prime Minister of Malta and Leader of the Labour Party (2020-)

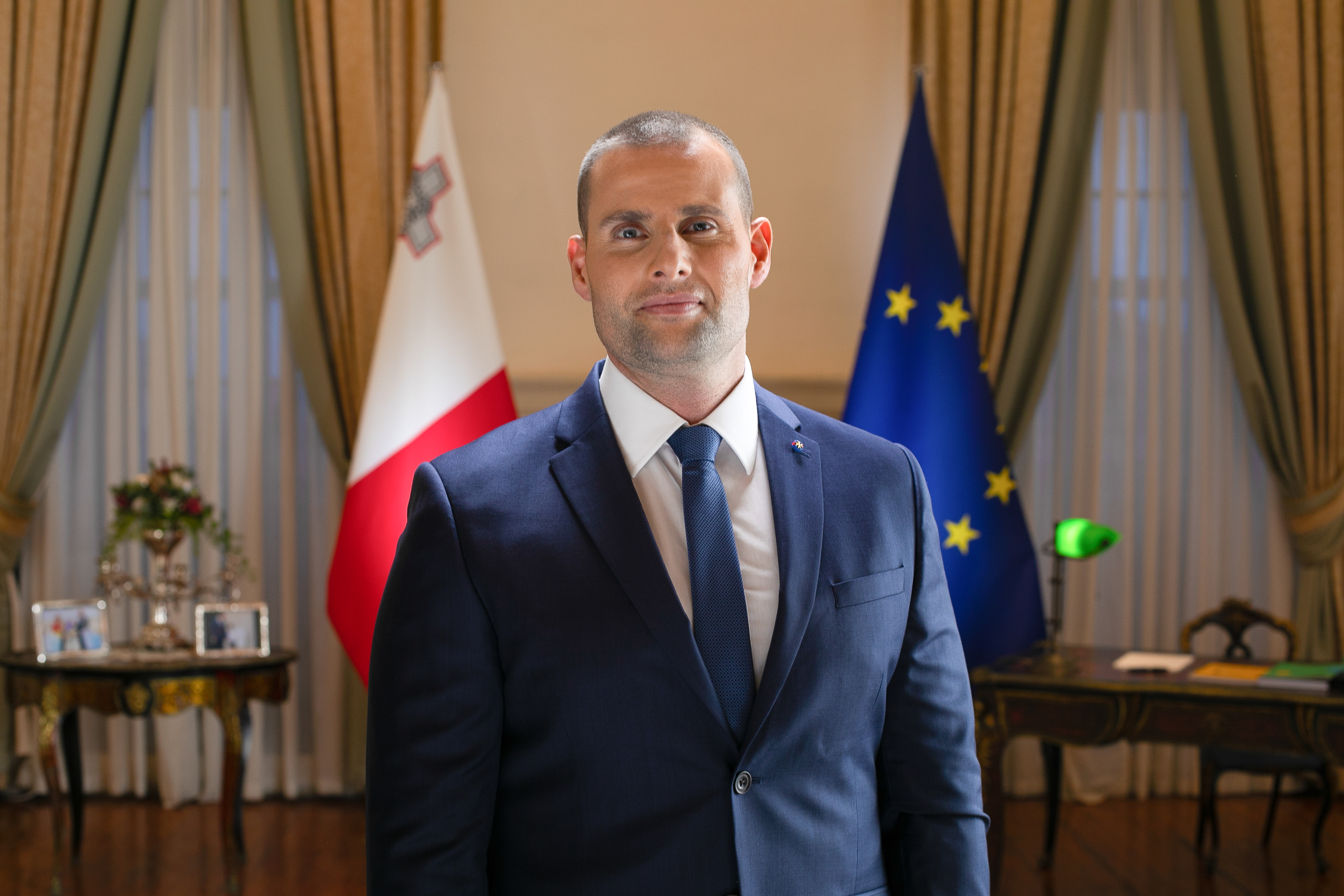
Robert Abela - Prime Minister of Malta (2020-)

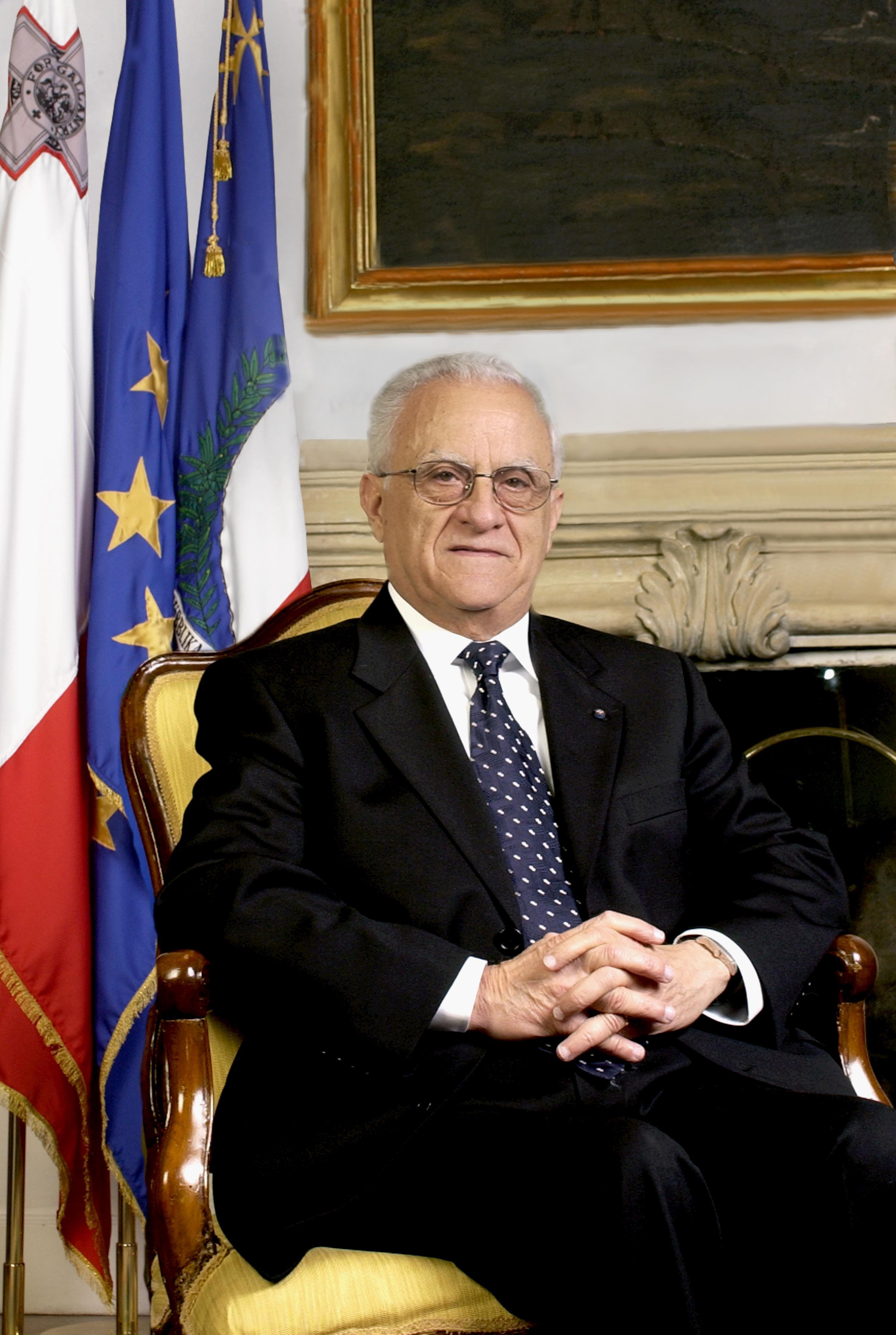
President Emeritus Edward Fenech Adami (2004-2009)

=== Politicians ===
- Tonio Borg - former European Commissioner for Health and Animal Welfare (2012-2014) and Deputy Prime Minister.
- Paul Borg Olivier - former Mayor of Valletta (1999-2008), and Secretary General of Partit Nazzjonalista(2008-2013).
- Simon Busuttil - former Leader of the Opposition (2013-2017)
- Adrian Delia - former Leader of the Opposition (2017-2020)
- Bernard Grech - former Leader of the Opposition (2020-2025)
- Christian Cardona - former Minister for the Economy, Investment and Small Businesses and Labour Party deputy leader for party affairs
- Carmelo Mifsud Bonnici - former Minister for Justice and Home Affairs, current Member of Parliament
- Joe Debono Grech - former Minister for Agriculture and Fisheries and Member of Parliament
- Edward Zammit Lewis - former Minister for Justice, Minister for Tourism and Minister for European Affairs, current Member of Parliament
- Mario de Marco - former Minister for Tourism, current opposition Member of Parliament
- Francis Zammit Dimech - former Cabinet Minister and Member of the European Parliament (2017-2019)
- Godfrey Farrugia - former Minister for Health and former Member of Parliament
- Chris Fearne - former Deputy Prime Minister and Minister for Health
- Tonio Fenech - former Minister of Finance
- Robert Arrigo - former Member of Parliament, businessman, and Nationalist Party deputy leader for party affairs
- Franco Debono - lawyer and former Member of Parliament

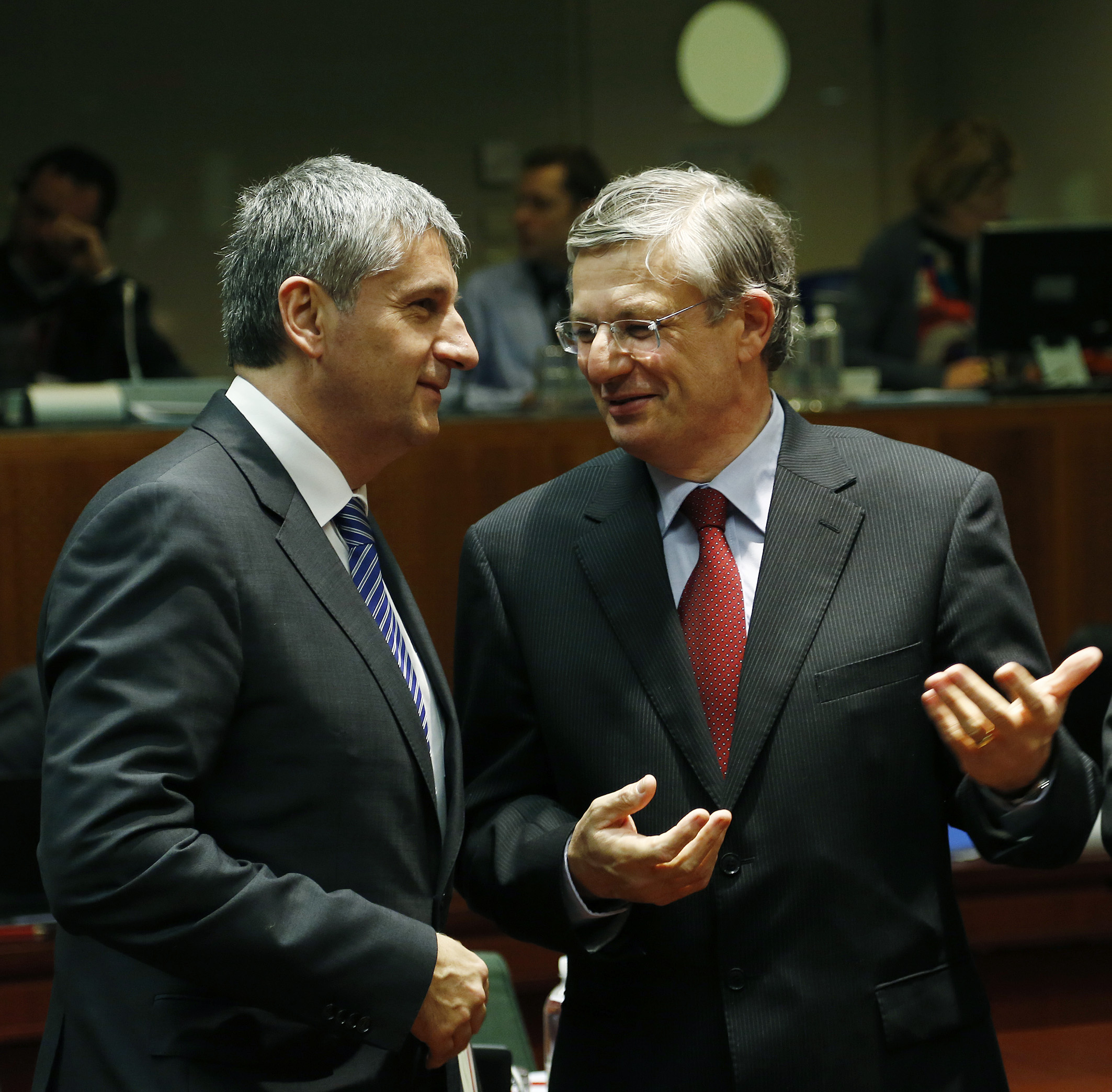
Former European Commissioner Tonio Borg (right)

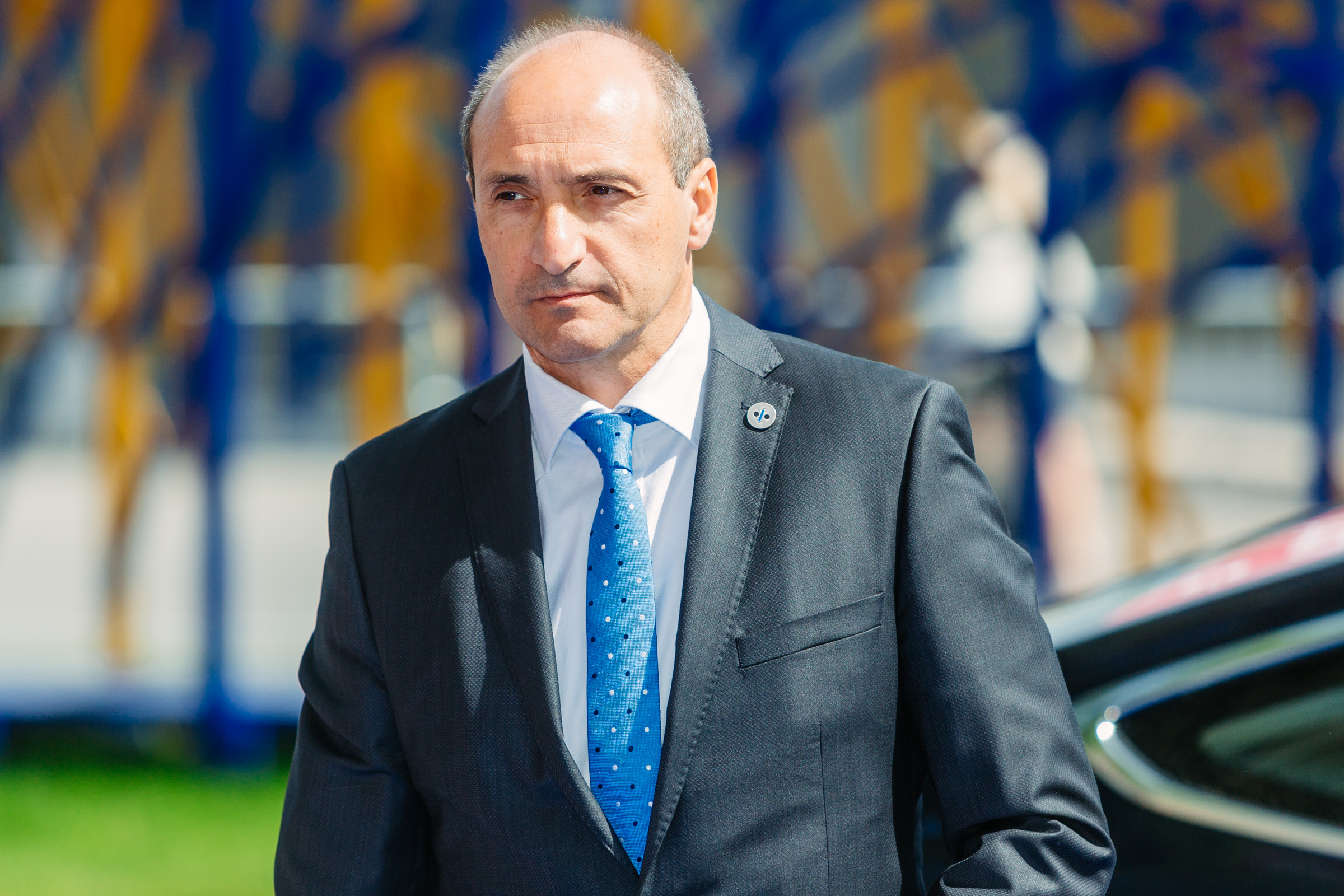
Former Deputy Prime Minister Chris Fearne

=== Others ===
- Daphne Caruana Galizia - journalist assassinated in 2017
- David J. Attard - Professor of International Law, Chancellor of the University of Malta
- Gianluca Bezzina - singer
- Ira Losco - singer
- Saviour Pirotta - children's author
- Frans Sammut - Maltese author
- Stephen C. Spiteri - military historian

== See also ==
- List of Jesuit schools
