= Alex Borg =

Alex Borg may refer to:

- Alex Borg (politician) (born 1995), Maltese politician and Leader of the Opposition
- Alex Borg (snooker player) (born 1969), Maltese former professional snooker player
