= Leader of the Opposition (Malta) =

Parliamentary position in Malta

Leader of the Opposition of Malta Kap tal-Oppożizzjoni ta' Malta
- Coat of Arms of the Republic of Malta

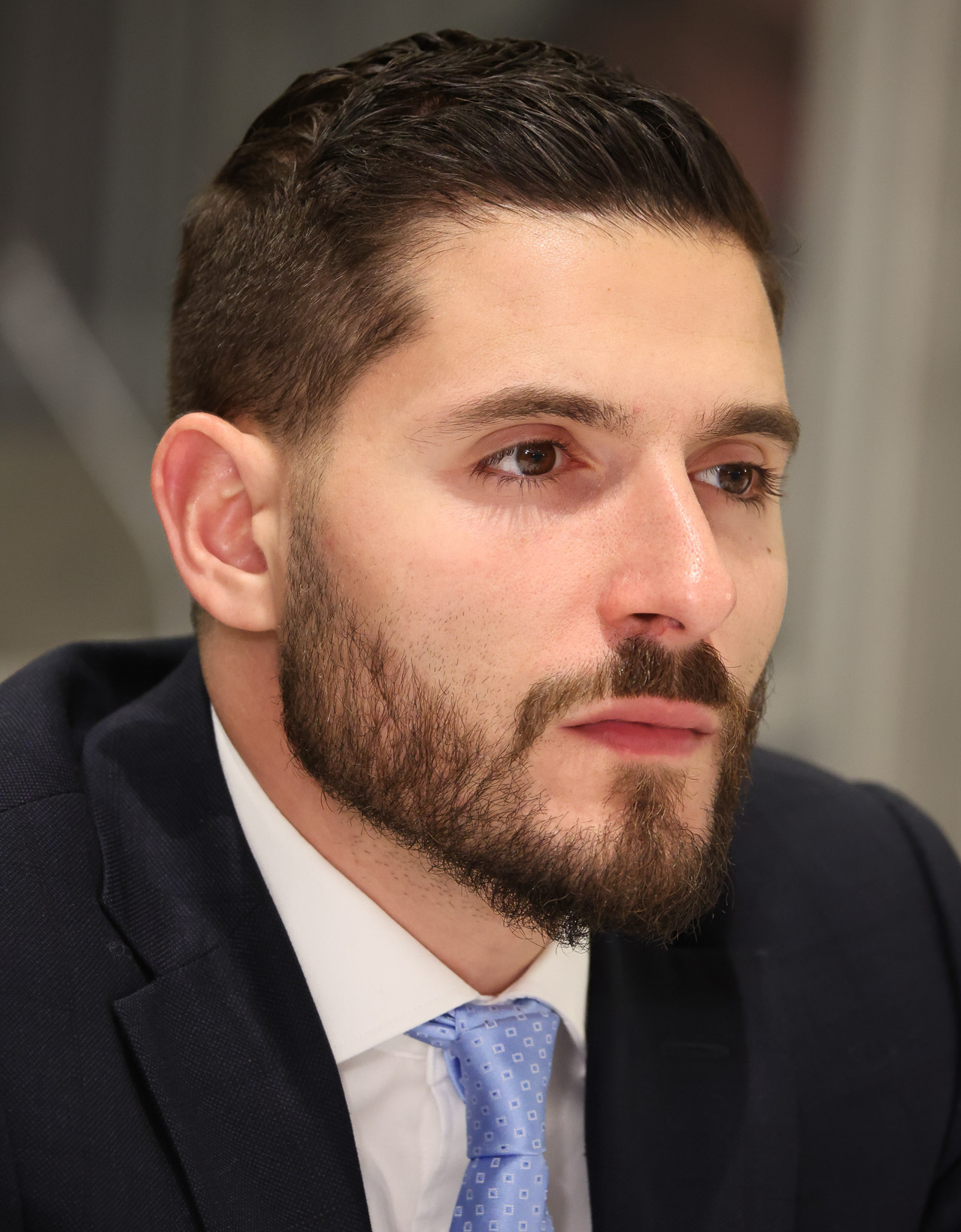
- Incumbent; Alex Borg since 7 October 2020
- Style: The Honourable
- Appointer: President of Malta
- Term length: While leader of the largest political party in the House of Representatives that is not in government. No term limits are imposed on the office. General elections are held every five years at a maximum, but may be held sooner.
- Inaugural holder: Gerald Strickland
- Formation: October 1921

In Malta, The Leader of the Opposition (officially the Leader of the Opposition of Malta) is, by convention, the leader of the largest political party in the House of Representatives that is not in government.

The Leader of the Opposition is appointed by the President of Malta, with the President making his or her decision based on the situation within the Maltese parliament.

The Office is constitutional in nature and the Leader of Opposition is normally viewed as an alternative Prime Minister, and must be a member of the House of Representatives. The post did not exist in the period between 1933 and 1947 or the period between 1958 and 1962.

The current Leader of the Opposition is Alex Borg, leader of the Nationalist Party, since 10 September 2025.

== List ==
- List of Leaders of the Opposition of Malta
