= 2003 Maltese European Union membership referendum =

- 8 March 2003
- Do you agree that Malta should become a member of the European Union in the enlargement that is to take place on 1 May 2004?

Results
Choice	Votes	%
Yes	143,094	53.65%
No	123,628	46.35%
Valid votes	266,722	98.55%
Invalid or blank votes	3,911	1.45%
Total votes	270,633	100.00%
Registered voters/turnout	297,881	90.85%

A referendum on European Union membership was held in Malta on 8 March 2003. The result was 54% in favour. The subsequent April 2003 general elections were won by the Nationalist Party, which was in favour of EU membership, the opposition Labour Party having opposed joining. Malta joined the EU on 1 May 2004.

The referendum saw the highest turnout in an EU membership referendum (91%) and the lowest support for joining of any of the nine countries that held referendums on joining the EU in 2003.

== Background ==
Malta's first relations with the European Economic Community (EEC) saw the signing of an Association Agreement in December 1970. This agreement called for the creation of a customs union based on free trade between Malta and the Bloc.

Malta submitted a formal application to join the European Community in July 1990, which was met with a positive opinion from the European Commission. However the application was suspended in 1996 with a new Labour government. After the Nationalist Party won the 1998 election, the new government reactivated Malta's membership application. Negotiations to join were finished at the Copenhagen summit in December 2002 and Malta was invited to join the EU in 2004.

The government of Malta announced in January 2003 that a non-binding referendum on membership would be held on 8 March 2003 at the same time as local elections.

== Campaign ==
In the run up to the referendum polls showed voters were evenly divided over EU membership. The Nationalist government argued that Malta would receive EU funds for the roads and tourist industry. They said that Malta needed the EU in order to cope with globalisation and accused the opposition of scaremongering.

The Labour opposition feared that EU membership would cost jobs due to the lowering of trade barriers and jeopardise Malta's independence. They preferred that Malta should form a partnership with the EU rather than seeking membership and called on Maltese votes to either spoil their ballot papers, abstain or vote no. One billboard for the no campaign showed the Prime Minister Eddie Fenech Adami wearing a Diaper made of the flag of Europe.

The largest trade union in Malta, the General Workers' Union opposed membership.

== Referendum question ==
The question voted in on in the referendum was confirmed on 3 January 2003. It was "Do you agree that Malta should become a member of the European Union in the enlargement that is to take place on 1 May 2004?"

== Results ==
Choice	Votes	%
For	143,094	53.65
Against	123,628	46.35
Total	266,722	100.00
Valid votes	266,722	98.55
Invalid/blank votes	3,911	1.45
Total votes	270,633	100.00
Registered voters/turnout	297,881	90.85
Source: Nohlen & Stöver

== Aftermath ==
Supporters of the Nationalist party celebrated the result of the referendum but the Labour leader Alfred Sant did not concede defeat and said the issue would be settled at the upcoming general election. He argued that only 48% of registered voters had voted yes and that therefore a majority had opposed membership by voting no, abstaining or spoiling their ballot. The day after the referendum the Prime Minister called the election for 12 April as expected, though it was not required until January 2004.

The main issue in the 2003 election was EU membership and the Nationalist party's victory enabled Malta to join on 1 May 2004.
