= Franco Debono =

Maltese politician

Commissioner of Laws
- In office March 24, 2013 – June 1, 2019
- Succeeded by: Antonio Mizzi

Member of the Parliament of Malta
- In office March 12, 2008 – March 13, 2013

Personal details
- Born: March 9, 1974 (age 52) Malta
- Party: Nationalist Party
- Education: University of Malta (Dr.)
- Occupation: Politician; Lawyer; Civil servant
- Website: Official site

Franco Debono (born 9 March 1974) is a Maltese criminal trial lawyer and former Nationalist member of Parliament.

In 1998, while still a university law student, he contested the general election on the Nationalist Party ticket and received 467 votes. In 1999 he graduated as a lawyer from the University of Malta and got his warrant to practice as a lawyer before the Maltese Superior and Inferior Courts on 9 March 2000. He set up his private practice in Zurrieq a village in the fifth district, his electoral constituency. From the very start he specialised in criminal law. In 2003 he contested the general election with the Nationalist Party again and polled 1132 votes. From 2008 until 2013 Debono served one term as Member of Parliament for the Nationalist Party. Debono is the former Commissioner of Laws of Malta, appointed by the Labour-led administration of Joseph Muscat on 24 March 2013.

== Personal life ==
Debono went to school at St Aloysius' College in Birkirkara. In 1999 he received a Doctorate of Laws from the University of Malta after successfully defending his thesis entitled "The constitutional implications of party organization and party finance." Debono runs a law firm called Franco Debono and Associates which is based in Valletta. His area of specialist practice is in criminal law.

== Political career ==
Debono first ran for office in 1998, contesting the fifth electoral district. He failed to win a parliamentary seat, ending up with just 467 votes. In 2003 Debono was once again on the ballot in the fifth district, this time gaining 1130 votes. It was once again not enough to gain the seat. Debono was elected in parliament with the Nationalist Party from the fifth district in 2008 when he gained 2065 votes. Newspaper Malta Today described Debono's election as a surprise win. Even more so, because Debono's election meant longstanding member of parliament Louis Galea who was minister of education and Helen Damato who was parliamentary secretary for the elderly became unseated.

In Parliament, Debono chaired the committee on the "Re-codification and consolidation of laws," and was also a member of the committee on "Black dust precipitation" chaired by Leo Brincat.

In late 2009, problems between Debono and the Nationalist Party leadership arose. According to Debono, who missed two votes in parliament, Malta was in desperate need of law reform. At the time, he still considered himself a proud member of the Nationalist Party, even though he toyed with switching his allegiance to Labour.

In November 2011, Debono started a campaign to split the Ministry for Justice and Home Affairs into two separate departments. In early 2012, Gonzi gave in to Debono's demand and took advantage of a cabinet reshuffle to separate the justice and home affairs portfolios from one another. Debono applauded the split, but nevertheless criticized the reshuffle as a whole, saying Gonzi had only promoted some of his secretaries (which Debono dubbed "the ruling clique") to ministerial posts.

In early January 2012, Debono was now so disgruntled with the current state of affairs within the PN, that he stated "I'll support anyone but Gonzi." Later that month, Debono once again hinted he was going to vote in line with Labour in one of their no confidence-motions, but abstained in the end, ensuring the motion was defeated with the casting vote of the speaker. Later on that year, he called Lawrence Gonzi "Malta's Hitler" on his blog, but removed the comments shortly afterwards.

In May 2012, Debono voted in favour of a motion of no confidence in Minister for Home and Parliamentary Affairs Carmelo Mifsud Bonnici, which subsequently passed. This deed forced Bonnici to resign. Debono supported the motion, because he felt Bonnici failed in bringing about reforms.

Debono contributed in toppling the Gonzi-led administration in a budget vote on 10 December 2012. The MP claimed he would vote against the government if Austin Gatt was not relinquished from his post. When Gonzi subsequently refused to give in to the demand, Debono cast his vote against the budget. Along with all the votes from Labour, the vote failed and new elections had to be called. "I am proud to have distanced myself from Austin Gatt's GonziPN," Debono declared afterwards.

After the fall of the government, but prior to the 2013 elections, Debono pledged to "remain a thorn in GonziPN's side" till the end of his own parliamentary career. After the election date had already been set, Debono attacked the PN on claims it is corrupt and for polluting the environment. Outgoing prime minister Gonzi replied that Debono had now become "irrelevant."

Debono also attempted to appear in a scheduled debate in Xarabank on 14 December 14 between the deputy leaders of the PN and the PL. Debono persuaded the PL to send him instead of actual PL-deputy leader Angelo Farrugia. Broadcaster PBS, however, cancelled the debate.

== Hydrogen as an alternative source of energy ==
In 2009, Franco Debono had predicted that hydrogen would become the primary global source of clean energy one day, urging Malta to plan ahead so it won’t be caught off guard. Addressing parliament on the 30 September 2009 he prophesied that “in 20 years’ time one of the sources of energy which will be in use would be hydrogen. This will be one of the main sources of alternative energy and I appeal that at least on a research level so that we would keep up with what is happening offshore, we keep our eyes wide open so that we would understand where such technology is heading.” Again, on the 24 November 2009, Dr. Debono addressed the Maltese Parliament on the same topic stating that “hydrogen is an element which is found in more or less abundance in the universe.” He had further emphasised that such technology was already being used and that already cars were running on hydrogen again urging the Maltese nation to keep up on the same topic. Debono’s calls fell on deaf ears and in January 2021 Malta lost out on EU cash for gas pipeline since the EU refused to finance the same, forcing Malta to change its energy plans and go for a hydrogen-ready system.

== Constitutional reform ==
=== The Committee for Constitutional Awareness ===
During his last legislature as an MP Debono conceived and proposed the Committee for Constitutional Awareness, which he later chaired. This Committee worked under the auspices and in close collaboration with the President of the Republic also in terms of her support as publicly pledged. The way this Committee functioned showed clearly that proposals from both the government and the Opposition could work together.

Constitutional reform had already started through the enactment of the Law on Party Finance and the Law on the Autonomy of Parliament which were two laws of a constitutional nature.

The Nationalist Party has since endorsed all of Debono’s proposals in Good Governance proposals.

=== The President to be appointed by two-thirds majority ===
One of the first institutional reforms Debono insisted on in 2010 was that the President of the Republic be appointed by a two-thirds majority in Parliament. Eight years later, the European Commission for Democracy Through Law, popularly known as the Venice Commission echoed the same proposals Debono had voiced nearly a decade before but which had not yet found their way in Malta’s corpus juris. In the thirteenth parliamentary speech, sitting number 186 on Wednesday 27 January 2010 Debono addressed Parliament on this issue.

In 2018, Debono commented again about his proposals of nearly a decade before, stating that his proposals were done "so as to give more dignity to the office," however, he was clearly against granting the President larger powers, terming this as a "step backwards" since "while Ministers are accountable to Parliament and the electorate for their appointments, the President is accountable to no one. Giving the President more powers may sound like a good idea on paper but in practice it will be sheer stupidity."

=== Law on Party Finance ===
Debono was also instructed to prepare the groundwork for a major legislation on party financing. Debono who was then appointed parliamentary assistant at the Office of the prime Minister had commented that transparency and disclosure of donors were the two crucial issues at stake. Although the three major political parties had divergent views on the threshold to be given Debono was not disheartened and had argued that the parties should not get stuck on the amount as well as that he was not inclined to favour a political party financing by the state. He reviewed all that had been written and followed what had been happening in other countries particularly the UK.[1]

=== Right of access to a lawyer during interrogation ===
Debono advocated for the right of access to a lawyer during interrogation, being for a long stretch of years the only voice fighting the battle in the name of a suspect. He pointed out the importance of this from the human rights perspective. In 2008, Malta was the only country in Europe which did not allow any right to legal assistance for arrested persons. After the law had passed, Debono became the first lawyer to ask for a constitutional reference for the Maltese Courts to declare this failure as a violation of a fundamental right, the case was won and the person was acquitted of the charge after a battle of almost four years

=== Drug laws ===
He was a pioneer in speaking of a ‘Drugs Court’ to be established as part of the Maltese Court system focusing exclusively on drugs related offences as well as a change in the recording systems in all court rooms from the ‘old cassette’ to a modern digital one.

== Post-political career ==
After the dissolution of parliament, Debono claimed he was "fed up with politics" and decided not to contest the general elections again, although for a time Debono toyed with the possibility of setting up a new party to push for democratic reform.

When the results of the 2013 elections came in, and it became clear that Labour had won the elections, a cheerful Debono was carried around on the shoulders of Labour Party supporters.

A few weeks after that, the newly installed Labour administration handed Debono an appointment in the new administration. One of Debono's tasks would be assuming the role of Commissioner of Laws. Overseeing constitutional reform is however one of the most important aspects of this job. According to Labour MP Owen Bonnici, the post would also see the former member of parliament working to remove conflicting, unconstitutional and human rights-breaching laws. In 2014, the government expanded his role by appointing him as chairman of the Law Commission. In addition, Debono was hired as a consultant to Prime Minister Joseph Muscat on the subject of justice reform.

In late 2015 and early 2016, Debono also became a critic of the Labour administration. The former Member of Parliament felt that the government's policies were "not what people had voted for". Debono said he was disappointed with Muscat for appointing a magistrate who allegedly breached the constitution.

In July 2016, Debono went on record claiming that he would be willing to re-enter Parliament as a Member of Parliament for Labour. Debono noted that he might follow up on efforts of Labour's supporters - who he called "soldiers of steel" - to get the former Nationalist to join the Labour Party in order to stand for elections. Debono claims his beliefs are in line with Labour's. Even so, Debono announced in May 2017 that he would not seek a return to parliament come the 2017 elections.

Following Bernard Grech's resignation as Leader of the Nationalist Party, on 10 June 2025, Debono had begun to be touted by local news and media outlets as a potential successor to Grech. He was considered to be a main contender for the leadership race, with other names such as Alex Borg, Roberta Metsola and Adrian Delia also mentioned as potential candidates.
