= Mercieca =

Mercieca is a surname. Notable people with the surname include:

- Arturo Mercieca (1878–1963), Maltese judge
- Grazio Mercieca, Maltese judge
- Joseph Mercieca (1928–2016), Maltese Roman Catholic archbishop
- Silvio Mercieca (1888–1954), Maltese architect
- Tamra Mercieca (born 1980), Australian author and therapist
- Jennifer Mercieca (born 1971), American rhetorical scholar
- Alain Mercieca (born 1981), Canadian video game writer
