= Rita Law =

Maltese politician

Rita Law is a former Maltese politician from the Labour Party. In the 1998 general election, she was elected to the Parliament of Malta from District 2. She did not seek re-election in the 2003 general election.
