= 2014 European Parliament election in Malta =

- 25 May 2014

All 6 Maltese seats to the European Parliament
- Turnout: 74.8%
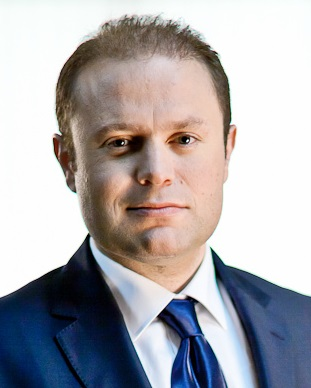

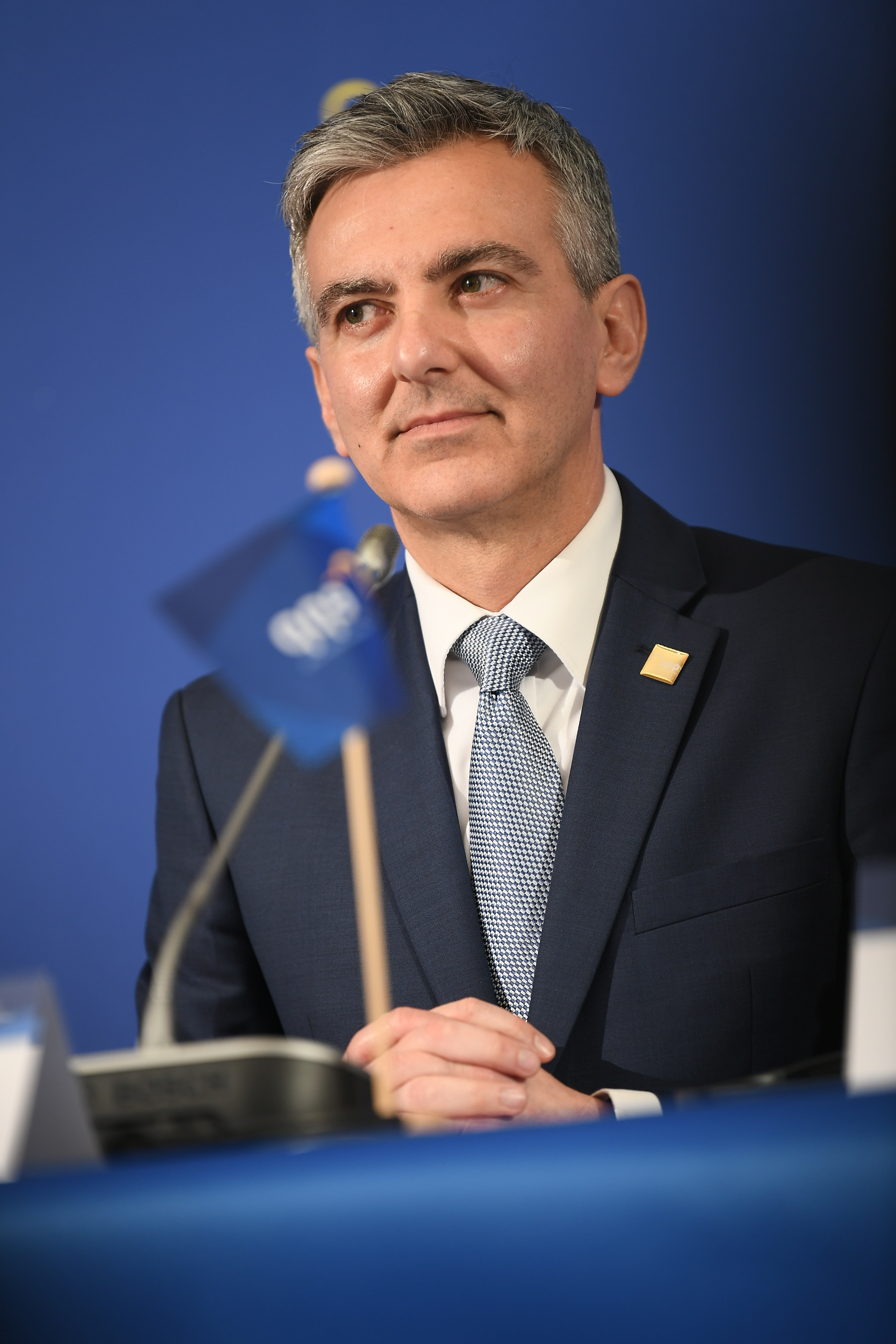
	First party	Second party
Leader	Joseph Muscat	Simon Busuttil
Party	Labour	Nationalist
Alliance	S&D	EPP
Leader since	6 June 2008	8 May 2013
Last election	54.77% 4 seats	40.49% 2 seats
Seats won	3	3
Seat change	▼1	▲1
Percentage	53%	40%

The 2014 European Parliament election in Malta elected Malta's delegation to the European Parliament from 2014 to 2019. This was the third such election held in Malta. The elections were held on Saturday, 24 May 2014.

The parties that contested the election were: Labour Party, Nationalist Party, Democratic Alternative, Imperium Europa, Alleanza Bidla, Alleanza Liberali, Partit Ta' L-Ajkla.

== Candidates ==
=== Imperium Europa ===
- Arlette Baldacchino
- Antoine Galea
- Norman Lowell

=== Partit Laburista ===
- Lino Bianco
- Clint Camilleri
- Peter Cordina
- Joseph Cuschieri
- Miriam Dalli
- Mario Borg Farrugia
- Charlon Gouder
- Ivan Grixti
- Marlene Mizzi
- Alfred Sant
- Deborah Schembri
- Fleur-Anne Vella

=== Partit Tal-Ajkla ===
- Nazzareno Bonnici

=== Partit Nazzjonalista ===
- Raymond Bugeja
- David Casa
- Therese Comodini Cachia
- Kevin Cutajar
- Helga Ellul
- Stefano Mallia
- Roberta Metsola
- Kevin Plumpton
- Jonathan Shaw
- Norman Vella
- Francis Zammit Dimech

=== Alternattiva Demokratika ===
- Carmel Cacopardo
- Arnold Cassola

=== Alleanza Bidla ===
- Anthony Calleja
- Ivan Grech Mintoff

=== Alleanza Liberali ===
- Jean-Pierre Sammut

== Results ==
The Labour Party won the election with a little over 53% of the votes. The result was announced by the Maltese Prime Minister, Joseph Muscat.

The Nationalist Party won 40%, Democratic Alternative 2.9%, Imperium Europa 2.8% and others 0.96%.

Party	Votes	%	Seats	+/–
Labour Party	134,462	53.39	3	–1
Nationalist Party	100,785	40.02	3	+1
Democratic Alternative	7,418	2.95	0	0
Imperium Europa	6,761	2.68	0	0
Ajkla	1,208	0.48	0	0
Alleanza Bidla	1,015	0.40	0	New
Liberal Alliance	202	0.08	0	0
Total	251,851	100.00	6	0
Valid votes	251,851	97.77		
Invalid/blank votes	5,737	2.23		
Total votes	257,588	100.00		
Registered voters/turnout	344,356	74.80		
Source: Electoral Commission

Despite receiving just 40% of the electors vote, the Nationalist Party won its third seat, previously held by the Labour Party. Therefore, the elected candidates are:
1. Alfred Sant (PL) (48739 votes)
2. Roberta Metsola (PN) (38442 votes)
3. Miriam Dalli (PL) (37533 votes)
4. David Casa (PN) (36371 votes)
5. Marlene Mizzi (PL) (35630 votes)
6. Therese Comodini Cachia (PN) (29580 votes).

== See also ==
- 2014 European Parliament election
- European elections in Malta
- 2009 European Parliament election in Malta
- 2004 European Parliament election in Malta
