= Antonio Mizzi =

Antonio Mizzi (Malta, 16 November 1953) is a retired Maltese judge and former Commissioner of Laws. Since 2026, Mizzi chairs Malta's Commission for Appointments and Discipline in Administrative Tribunals.

== Early life and education ==
Mizzi obtained a Doctor of Laws (LL.D.) degree at the University of Malta and, in 1996, a postgraduate qualification in European law, styled Magister Juris (EU Law), with master's dissertation on Franchising in the European Community.

== Judicial career ==
=== Magistrate ===
Mizzi was appointed magistrate in 1987 and served in the Maltese courts until 2013. During this period, he presided over proceedings in the Court of Magistrates, exercising criminal jurisdiction and conducting criminal inquiries. Court judgments from his tenure document his involvement in criminal proceedings brought by the police against accused persons.

His judicial work included the consideration of criminal charges, procedural applications and decisions arising during court proceedings. His service as a magistrate lasted approximately 26 years, before his appointment to the Superior Courts in June 2013.

=== Judge of the Superior Courts ===
On 14 June 2013, Mizzi was appointed a judge of the Superior Courts of Malta by the president of Malta, acting on the advice of new prime minister Joseph Muscat. He served as a judge until his retirement in 2018.

During his judicial career, Mizzi presided over criminal proceedings and other court cases. His last high-profile cases involved proceedings connected with the Panama Papers. Then Opposition leader Simon Busuttil had objected to the case being heard by a judge who is married to a Labour MEP, Marlene Mizzi. In July 2018, Malta's Constitutional Court upheld Busuttil's appeal. According to the judges, Mizzi's marriage did not in itself question his impartiality. At the same time, when coupled with Marlene Mizzi's comments on the case, this could give rise to serious doubts about justice being seen to be done. The Constitutional Court thus ordered that a different judge be assigned to the case. However, upon an appeal by the attorney-general, in November the same Constitutional Court found that Busuttil had no right to ask for the judge to be recused, as he could not be considered a victim in the case, and that Mizzi could thus hear the appeal. This took place in the very last days before his retirement. Upon his last court hearing, in November 2018, Antonio Mizzi stressed that "I never took sides, I couldn't be bothered about political parties. I have always done my duty without fear or favour. It hurt and angered me when shadows were cast upon me. But that's enough."

In 2020, during the trial of Yorgen Fenech for the murder of Daphne Caruana Galizia, state witness Melvin Theuma stated under oath that Fenech had told him that Keith Schembri had approached former judge Antonio Mizzi on beahalf of Joseph Muscat to ask for information and arrange the release on bail of the Degiorgio brothers, accused of being the killers. Judge Mizzi stated that nobody had approached him, and recalled that he had twice rejected bail for the Degiorgios on 7 August and 2 October 2018.

== Commissioner of Laws ==
In June 2019, Mizzi was appointed Commissioner of Laws by the Maltese government, succeeding Franco Debono. His appointment, initially for one year and renewable, took effect retrospectively from 1 June 2019. The position brings a remuneration of some €30,000 per year, as well as an official car and driver Opposition leader Simon Busuttil had objected to the award of post-retirement public posts to judges, as an incentives for judges to rule in favour of the ruling government, deeming it as undermining the independence of the judiciary.

The commissioner of laws is responsible for reviewing and improving the consistency of Maltese legislation, including identifying legal provisions that may conflict with one another or with human rights protections. In this role, Mizzi contributed to public discussions concerning criminal law and the proportionality of legal measures, including legislation addressing proceeds of crime.

In October 2026, former justice minister Edward Zammit Lewis was appointed as his successor.

== Other public appointments ==
Following retirement, Antonio Mizzi has collected multiple and subsequent governmental appointments. This, together with the appointments of his wife (former MEP Marlene Mizzi) and daughter (Alexandra Mizzi), has attracted public scrutiny.

Mizzi served as president of the Malta Basketball Association (MBA) for 14 years, from 12 December 1996 until June 2011. Mizzi also held senior positions within the international governing bodies of basketball, including the presidency of the FIBA World Legal Commission for the 2006–2010 term and the vice-presidency of the FIBA Europe Legal Commission. As the code of ethics of Malta's judiciary precludes judges and magistrates from holding other public posts, including in sports organisations, the Commission for the Administration of Justice of Malta repeatedly asked Mizzi to step down, which he refused to.

In November 2022, Education Minister Clifton Grima appointed Antonio Mizzi to chair the Authority for the Integrity of Maltese Sport - a position worth another €20,000 a year. His appointment was criticised as “partisan and not in the interest of sports” by sport officials, who also pointed at his previous conflicts of interest as MBA president while a sitting member of the judiciary, in breach of the code of ethics. By late 2026, he continues to chair the authority.

In October 2023, Mizzi was appointed chairperson of the Embryo Protection Authority, with a term running until July 2025. he was replaced in late 2026 by PL President Alex Sciberras.

Mzzi was then appointed by Education Minister Byron Camilleri as chairperson of the Council for the Teaching Profession, from 1 October 2026, with a remuneration of some 20,000€ per year for three years.

In October 2026, he was appointed chairperson of the Commission for Appointments and Discipline in Administrative Tribunals, a body entrusted with the appointment and discipline of the members of the administrative tribunals of Malta. The appointments took effect on 9 October 2026.

Mizzi also still chairs the Parole Board.

== Personal life ==
Mizzi is married to Marlene Mizzi, a former Maltese Member of the European Parliament. Their daughter Alexandra Mizzi, who runs her mother's private business, also serves as secretary of Film Finance Malta Ltd, the public company in charge of disbursing funds to the film industry.
