= Charlon Gouder =

Maltese businessman, lawyer and former journalist

- Born: October 17, 1981 (age 44)
- Education: University of Malta
- Occupations: Lawyer; businessman; lobbyist; journalist
- Political party: Labour Party
- Spouse: Sarah

Charlon Gouder is a Maltese businessman, lawyer and former journalist with the network One.

== Early life ==
In his teens, Gouder studied at Ġ.F. Abela Junior College. He played the trombone with the Msida band club and the Malta Philharmonic Orchestra.

== Career ==
=== Journalism ===
Gouder hosted a current affairs program on One called Viċi Versa.

=== Business ===
In his capacity as a lawyer, Gouder founded the law firm Gouder & Associates. Gouder is Chief Executive Officer of Aquaculture Resources Ltd, a congolermamte formed between Malta's largest fish farm owners.

=== Politics ===
He voted against joining the European Union in the 2003 membership referendum. Gouder stood as a candidate for the Labour Party in the 2014 European Parliament election in Malta. He failed to get elected, with 6719 first count votes. Gouder has a close friendship with former Prime Minister Joseph Muscat and has represented him in various legal proceedings, including the Vitals Hospital inquiry. In July 2025, Gouder was appointed by Minister Anton Refalo to the Food Safety and Security Council for a period of 3 years.

== Legal issues ==
In 2006, Charlon Gouder was found guilty of breaching Article 4 of the Code of Ethics. It was found Gouder breached ethics by airing a recorded telephone conversation with then-Nationalist Party treasurer Peter Darmanin without asking Darmanin for permission. In 2007, Gouder was once again found guilty of breaching journalistic ethics by the Commission for Journalistic Ethics.

In 2010, Gouder accused journalist and blogger Daphne Caruana Galizia of criminal libel while Gouder and his TV crew were filming her outside court in 2010. Caruana Galizia was acquitted of libel in 2012.

In 2014, Gouder was sued by former Nationalist Finance Minister Tonio Fenech for defamation over allegations Gouder made that cases of energy theft were not thoroughly invested by Enemalta. Gouder later retracted the allegations. In 2015 a court ordered that Gouder and Kurt Farrugia pay former St. Paul's Bay mayor Graziella Galea €2000 in libel damages.
