= Grazio Mercieca =

Maltese politician and judge (born 1957)

Grazio Mercieca (born 1957 in Żabbar) is a Maltese former politician and judge, since 2026 chair of Malta's disciplinary board for healthcare practitioners, and supervisor of state advertisement expenditures.

== Biography ==
=== Studies and family life ===
Grazio Mercieca graduated as a lawyer in 1982. He is married to Maria and they have three children; Deborah, Caroline and Anton.

=== Lawyer, politician and adjudicator ===
Despite hailing from Żabbar, Mercieca lived in Gozo, also serving as president of Labour’s Gozo section. He practiced for 30 years as lawyer in Gozo. During that time he was also appointed by the government to some of the administrative tribunals of Malta, notably serving as Commissioner for justice, as member of the Small Claims Tribunal (chairing its Gozo section), and as an arbiter specialised in traffic accidents.

Following the 2013 Maltese general election won by the Labour Party, Mercieca served as chief adviser to Anton Refalo, the Minister for Gozo, earning €50,000 per year. He resigned in 2015 to become court attorney for judge Wenzu Mintoff.

=== Member of the judiciary ===
Toni Abela and Grazio Mercieca were reported to be the first two lawyers to apply to become judges under the new system introduced by the 2016 constitutional amendments.

In 2016, the Judicial Appointments Committee of the Commission for the Administration of Justice of Malta recommended Mercieca for appointment as a judge. However, he was only sworn in as a magistrate, for reasons that remained unclear.

Mercieca was finally appointed judge in October 2018. In his inaugural speech, he stressed that in the four years before retiring he planned to tackle the court caseload, pointing out how, as Magistrate, he had cleared all backlog on collision proceedings and civil lawsuits in three districts.

In July 2018, Mercieca was assigned cases involving the judicial review of decisions by the government and public authorities. Given his previous political career and service as an adviser to Gozo minister Refalo, some lawyers raised concerns about potential conflicts of interest and possible applications for his recusal from cases.

Mercieca retired from the judicial bench in November 2025.

=== Chair of the disciplinary board for healthcare professionals ===
After retiring, in April 2026 Mercieca was appointed by the Minister for Health and Active Ageing for a six-year term (until 2032) as chair of Malta's Disciplinary Board, which is tasked with investigating and adjudicating professional misconduct and ethical breaches among healthcare practitioners.

=== Monitoring state advertisement expenditure ===
In Autumn 2026, Mercieca was tasked by the Government to independently monitor and publish information about state advertising expenditure under Malta’s implementation of the European Media Freedom Act. The post is remunerated with €73,800 annually for seven years (until late 2033), on top of his service pension and of other honoraries.
