= Lino Bianco =

Maltese architect, academic and diplomat (born 1965)

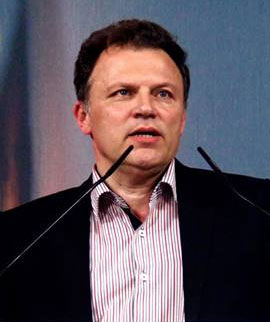
- Lino Bianco in 2014.
- Born: 31 December 1965 (age 60); Malta
- Education: University of Malta; University of Leicester; University College London; University of Architecture, Civil Engineering and Geodesy, Sofia
- Occupations: Architect; Academic; Diplomat
- Years active: 1993 - Present
- Website: http://www.lino-bianco.com

Lino Bianco (born 31 December 1965) is a Maltese architect, academic and diplomat.

== Biography ==
Bianco graduated in philosophy (under Peter Serracino Inglott) and in architecture (under Richard England) at the University of Malta. He furthered his studies in industrial geology at the University of Leicester, and in architecture at The Bartlett Graduate School, University College London (under Adrian Forty). He achieved a doctoral degree in architecture and politics at the University of Architecture, Civil Engineering and Geodesy, Sofia, under the academic supervision of Veselina Troeva, with a thesis on the development of Sofia. Bianco holds the Eur. Ing. from the European Federation of National Engineering Associations (FEANI).

He is a fellow of the Royal Society of Arts (London) and of the Geological Society (London).

Since 1994 Bianco has held various visiting teaching posts, lecturing on the philosophy of restoration of heritage sites, industrial and environmental geology, and minerals planning. He is a resident academic at the Department of Architecture and Urban Design of the University of Malta where he teaches and directs research on the history and philosophy of architecture. He is a professor of the International Academy of Architecture and a visiting professor in history and theory of urban design at the University of Architecture, Civil Engineering and Geodesy, Sofia.

In 1997 he set up his architectural firm, Lino Bianco & Associates. From 1997-8, he was Chairman of the Planning Council Malta and, from 1997 until 2000, a member of the Planning Appeals Board (Malta). He was a member of the Board of Directors of the Housing Authority, Malta, member of the Board of Directors of WasteServ Malta Ltd and member of the General Services Board, Malta.

Bianco is acknowledged for challenging developments which impinge negatively on natural and/or cultural heritage, such as the multimillion touristic development of Ramla l-Hamra in Gozo, a site associated with the legendary Homeric nymph Calypso. This case was eventually taken up at the national political level and took more than six years. Bianco describes himself as pro-development but against speculation, and the Times of Malta had described his approach to environmental protection as innovative.

In 2012, he was elected professor of the International Academy of Architecture at the World Triennial of Architecture held in Sofia in 2012; he is one of the youngest architects to hold this post. A project in Zabbar, Malta, received a special prize from the Ministry of Building of Ulyanovsk Region, Russia, for innovation in traditional architecture at InterArch2012. In 2015, he received a special prize of the Embassy of the Russian Federation in Sofia for his project in Gozo entitled ‘A Home of Time and Memory’

Bianco was a candidate of the Labour Party for the 2014 European elections in Malta. His stand on irregular immigration, spring hunting and the environment, themes which ran high on the political agenda, illustrated his political philosophy of toleration applied to real scenarios. He was not elected.

The same year, Bianco was appointed non-resident Ambassador of Malta to Bulgaria, a position which he held until 2019.

He is also non-resident ambassador of Malta to Romania and to Moldova, since 2014.

== Selected works ==
=== Architectural ===
- ‘A Home for an Architect’, (Completed, 1998–2001), Zabbar, Malta
- Entrances to Second World War shelter, (2005-2006), Zabbar, Malta
- Shopping complex, (Completed 2008), Paola, Malta
- Interpretation facility, (Design, 2008), Mgarr, Gozo
- Apartments at Ħamrun, (Completed, 2008–11), Hamrun, Malta
- Apartments at Nadur, (Design, 2009), Nadur, Gozo
- Artisan Urban Hub, Place Lalla Yeddouna, Fez, Morocco (Competition entry, 2010)
- Redevelopment of Via Roma, Agazzano, Italy (Competition entry, 2012)
- Upgrading and restoration of the ‘Boutilliere’, Cogne, Valle d'Aosta, Italy (Competition entry, 2012)
- Public spaces for Halte Ceva Champel Hopital, Genève (Competition entry, 2012)

== Honours ==
- Malta : Member of the National Order of Merit
- Bulgaria: The Order of Madara Horseman – First Class
- Sovereign Military Order of Malta: Cross of Commander pro Merito Melitensi

== Films and Videos ==
- Our Diezsa (2013). A 20-minute film on the Dgħajsa tal-Pass (The Maltese Gondola), the Seatoland project of Temi Zammit Foundation. Lino Bianco was architect responsible for the architectural design. Film directed by Narcy Calamatta.
- 24 05: Profil ta’ Lino Bianco (2014). A 27-minute documentary on Lino Bianco, one in a series prepared by ONE TV. It gives a background of his life, education, career, and his philosophy. Directed by Matthew Carbone.
