= Alfred Sant =

Maltese writer, editor, politician

Alfred Sant KUOM
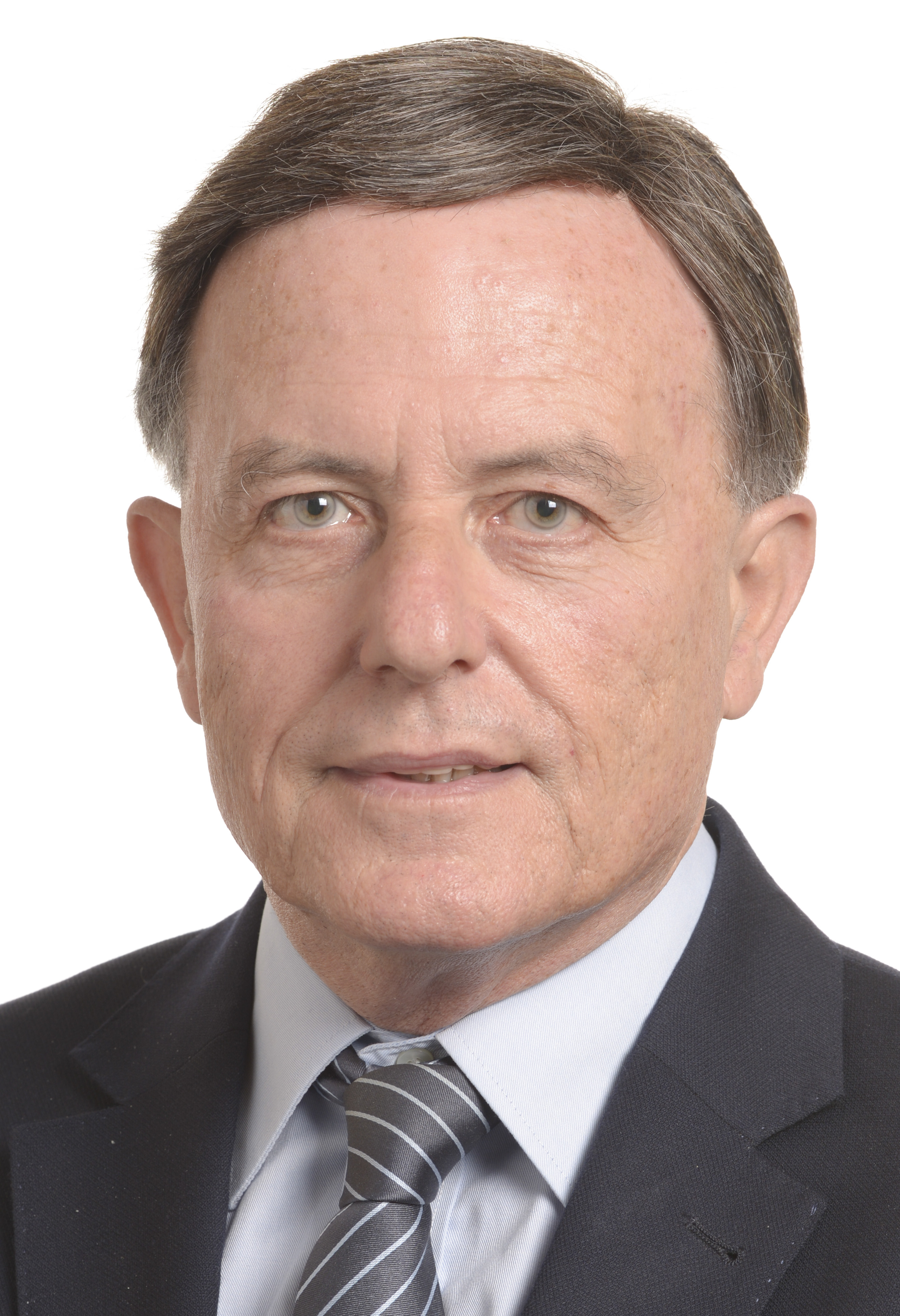

11th Prime Minister of Malta
- In office 28 October 1996 – 6 September 1998
- President: Ugo Mifsud Bonnici
- Preceded by: Eddie Fenech Adami
- Succeeded by: Eddie Fenech Adami

Leader of the Labour Party
- In office 26 March 1992 – 6 June 2008
- Deputy: George Vella; Charles Mangion
- Preceded by: Karmenu Mifsud Bonnici
- Succeeded by: Joseph Muscat

Leader of the Opposition
- In office 6 September 1998 – 5 June 2008
- President: Ugo Mifsud Bonnici
- Prime Minister: Eddie Fenech Adami; Lawrence Gonzi
- Preceded by: Eddie Fenech Adami
- Succeeded by: Charles Mangion (Acting); Joseph Muscat
- In office 26 March 1992 – 28 October 1996
- President: Ċensu Tabone; Ugo Mifsud Bonnici
- Prime Minister: Eddie Fenech Adami
- Preceded by: Karmenu Mifsud Bonnici
- Succeeded by: Eddie Fenech Adami

Member of the European Parliament for Malta
- In office 1 July 2014 – 8 June 2024

Minister for Home Affairs
- In office 28 October 1996 – 6 September 1998
- Succeeded by: Tonio Borg

Personal details
- Born: 28 February 1948 (age 78) Pietà, Crown Colony of Malta
- Party: Labour
- Education: University of Malta (BSc, MSc); École nationale d'administration (MPA); Boston University (MBA); Harvard University (DBA)

Alfred Sant, KUOM (born 28 February 1948) is a Maltese politician and a novelist. He led the Labour Party from 1992 to 2008 and served as Prime Minister of Malta between 1996 and 1998 and as Leader of the Opposition from 1992 to 1996 and from 1998 to 2008. Sant is an established writer and playwright and has published several books.

== Biography ==
=== Studies and career ===
Sant graduated from the University of Malta as Bachelor of Science in Physics and Mathematics in 1967 and as Master of Science in Physics in the following year. He studied public administration in 1970 at the Institut International d'Administration Publique of the École Nationale d'Administration (ENA) in Paris.

Sant served as second, and then first secretary at the Mission of Malta to the European Communities in Brussels between 1970 and 1975 when he resigned to undertake full-time studies in the USA. He completed a Master of Business Management (with honors) from Boston University Graduate School of Management in 1976 and graduated a Doctor of Business Administration from Harvard Business School in 1979.

Between 1977 and 1978 Sant served as advisor on general and financial management at the Ministry of Parastatal and People's Industries in 1977–1978, and then as the managing director of Medina Consulting Group in 1978–1980. Sant returned to the public sector in 1980 as executive deputy chairman with the Malta Development Corporation. As of 1982 he started working as a private consultant.

Sant's first political post with the Labour Party was as chair of its Department of Information (1982–92). During this time he also served as President of the Party (1984–88) and chaired the Guze Ellul Mercer Foundation of the Malta Labour Party and the General Workers' Union. He served a stint as the editor of the Party weekly Il-Ħelsien (1987–88).

In 1988–89, he chaired a party working group on the relations with the European Community, whose report was then published in English and Maltese. Another study by Sant, entitled "Malta's European Challenge", was published in 1995, and focused on the need for Malta to establish the best possible relations with the European Union compatible with Malta's position at the centre of the Mediterranean.

Sant first stood for election in 1987; although he was unsuccessful, he was co-opted to Parliament later that year. In 1992, following the resignation of Karmenu Mifsud Bonnici, he was elected as party leader.

=== Prime Minister in 1996-98 ===
The Labour Party won the October 1996 elections under Sant who campaigned for the removal of the Value Added Tax (VAT) that had been introduced in 1995 as an unpopular but required step towards EU accession. A year after taking office, the government replaced VAT by a similar indirect tax, the Customs and Excise Tax (CET). The government also froze Malta's application for EU membership, which had been submitted by the previous Nationalist government.

Sant's tenure as prime minister lasted only 22 months. Enjoying only a one-seat majority in Parliament, the Government was vulnerable to threats from former prime minister and Labour leader Dom Mintoff. Things came to a head in the summer of 1998 when a row with Mintoff over a coastal concession to a private company resulted in the Government being defeated on the motion transferring the land. Sant felt that the government's parliamentary majority was compromised and asked the president to dissolve the House. In the subsequent snap elections held in September 1998 the Labour Party was defeated.

=== 2003 Referendum and election ===
The Nationalist party, back in power, reactivated Malta's EU membership bid. Alfred Sant stayed on as leader of the opposition and campaigned against Malta's accession into the European Union.

In the run-up to the March 2003 referendum on EU accession, Sant was also critical of what he called a "sham referendum" insisting that a general election alone would settle the EU membership issue. He called on Labour supporters to either vote No, abstain or invalidate their vote. He himself abstained. The Yes side won the referendum by 54% with over 90% turnout - but Sant claimed that this was fewer than half of all eligible voters. On the basis of this "puzzling" interpretation, both sides were claiming victory in the streets. In view of the lack of consensus on the interpretation of the result, Prime Minister Eddie Fenech Adami asked the president to dissolve the Parliament and call for fresh elections. These were held in April 2003 and the Labour Party was again defeated at the polls.

Sant tendered his resignation as party leader. He did, however, stand for election for Party leader again which was contested by two other candidates for the post, John Attard Montalto and Angelo Farrugia. Sant was re-elected party leader with 66% of votes cast by Labour Party delegates and returned to lead the Party.

=== 2008 general election ===
The Labour Party, spearheaded by Sant, presented a new programme Pjan għal bidu ġdid (Plan for a new beginning) and called for Bżonn ta' Bidla (The need for a Change) after the 20 years (save for his brief stint from 1996 to 1998) of Nationalist government. The electoral programme contained references to overhauls in the educational system (which proved to be extremely controversial), reduction of an electricity surcharge by half, and tax breaks on overtime work.

At the 2008 Maltese general election Sant was defeated for the third consecutive time, this time by Lawrence Gonzi, on a slim margin of only 1,580 votes. Following the loss of the election, Sant resigned as leader of the Labour Party on 10 March 2008, and as Leader of the Opposition on 5 June 2008; he was succeeded as party leader by Joseph Muscat and as leader of the opposition by Charles Mangion. He retained his Parliamentary seat.

=== 2014 European Parliament election ===
Sant announced that he would stand as a Labour Party candidate in the 2014 European Parliament election, despite his previous opposition to EU membership for Malta. He received 48,739 votes, which elected him outright, acquiring more votes than any other candidate. He was re-elected in 2019 but decided not to stand for re-election in 2024.

== Literary works and journalism ==
Alfred Sant is a novelist, short story writer, and playwright. His published works include plays, short stories, novels, and non-fiction.

=== Plays ===
- Min Hu Evelyn Costa? (1979)
- Fid-Dell tal-Katidral (1994)
- Qabel Tiftaħ l-Inkjesta (1999)

=== Short story collections ===
- Kwart ta' Mija (1995)
- Pupu fil-Baħar (2009)

=== Novels ===
- L-Ewwel Weraq tal-Bajtar (1968)
- Bejgħ u Xiri (1981)
- Silġ fuq Kemmuna (1982)
- La Bidu, La Tmiem (2001)
- L-Għalqa tal-Iskarjota (2009)
- George Bush f'Malta (2013)

=== Non-fiction works ===
- Collection of political essays, L-Impenn għall-Bidla (1986)
- Chronicle (political), It-28 ta' April 1958 (1988)
- Malta's European Challenge (1995)
- Confessions of a European Maltese (2003 autobiography)
- Is-Soċjaliżmu fi Żminijietna (2004)

=== Other writings ===
Sant edited Tomorrow, a monthly English-language magazine (1982–1985), and of Society, a quarterly opinion magazine, apart from authoring numerous articles. Sant also contributed regularly to the General Workers' Union's Sunday Maltese-language newspaper It-Torċa until March 2008.

== Honours ==
=== National honours ===
- Malta : Companion of Honour of the National Order of Merit (1996) by right as a Prime Minister of Malta

== See also ==
- Prime Minister of Malta
- List of prime ministers of Malta
- Frans Sammut (2008): Alfred Sant: Il-Vizjoni ghall-Bidla

Party political offices
| Preceded by Karmenu Mifsud Bonnici | Leader of the Labour Party; 1992–2008 | Succeeded by Joseph Muscat |
Political offices
| Preceded by Eddie Fenech Adami | Prime Minister of Malta; 1996–1998 | Succeeded by Eddie Fenech Adami |
