= Edward Zammit Lewis =

Maltese politician and lawyer

Dr Edward Zammit Lewis
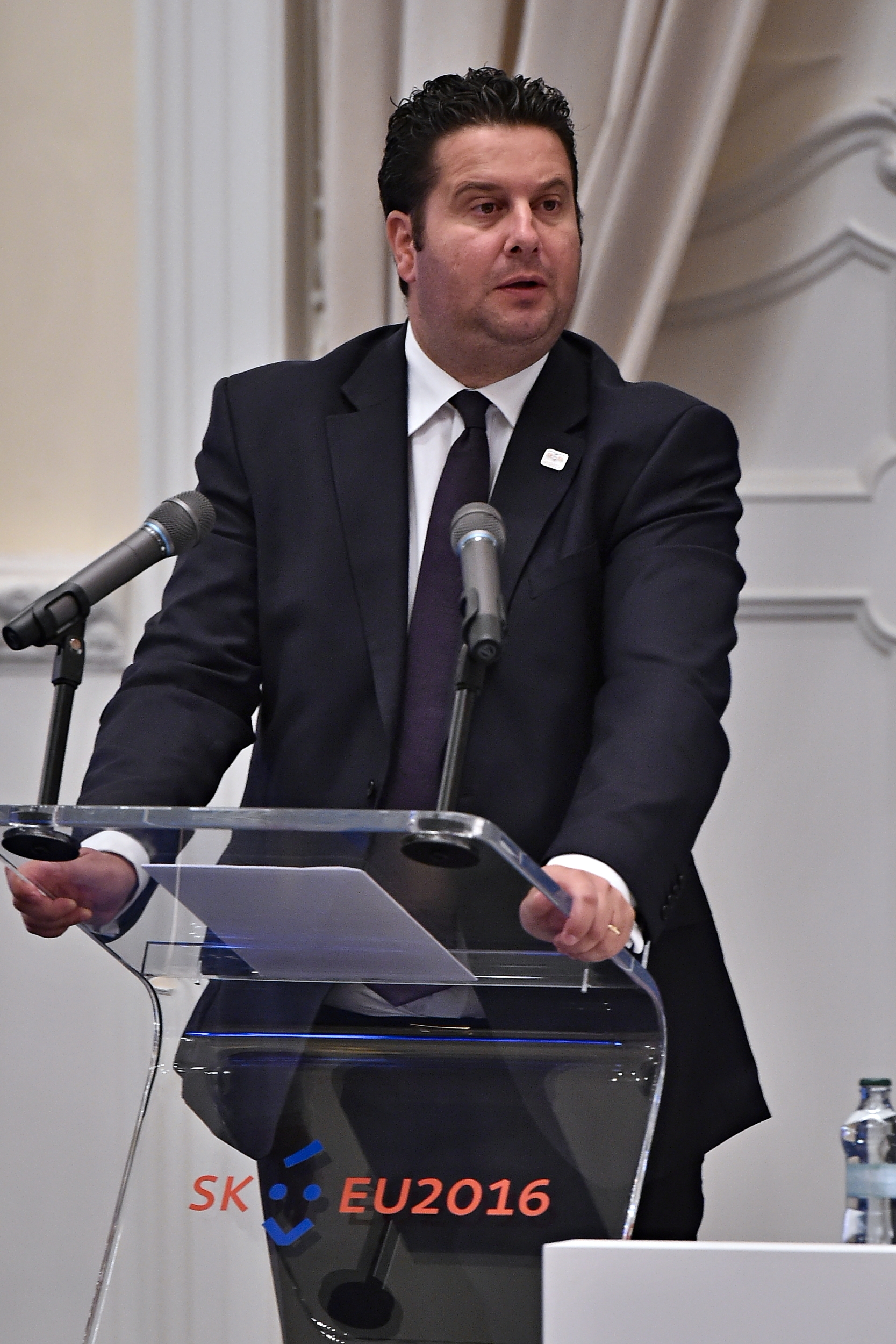
- Zammit Lewis in 2016

Commissioner of Laws
- Incumbent
- Assumed office 16 October 2026
- Preceded by: Antonio Mizzi

Minister for Justice and Governance
- In office 15 January 2020 – 20 February 2022
- Prime Minister: Robert Abela
- Preceded by: Owen Bonnici
- Succeeded by: Jonathan Attard

Minister for European Affairs and Equality
- In office 25 July 2019 – 13 January 2020
- Prime Minister: Joseph Muscat
- Preceded by: Helena Dalli
- Succeeded by: Evarist Bartolo as Minister for European and Foreign Affairs

Minister for Tourism
- In office 29 March 2014 – 1 May 2017
- Prime Minister: Joseph Muscat
- Preceded by: Karmenu Vella
- Succeeded by: Konrad Mizzi

Parliamentary Secretary for Competitiveness and Economic Growth
- In office 13 March 2013 – 29 March 2014
- Prime Minister: Joseph Muscat

Member of Parliament
- In office 9 March 2013 – 30 May 2026
- Constituency: District 8

Personal details
- Born: 21 June 1973 (age 53) Pietà, State of Malta
- Party: Labour Party
- Education: Bachelor of Laws and Doctorate of Laws at the University of Malta
- Website: edwardzammitlewis.com

Edward Zammit Lewis MP (born 21 June 1973 in Pietà) is a Maltese politician within the Labour Party, and a former member of Parliament and Minister.

== Biography ==
=== Studies and personal life ===
Edward Zammit Lewis attended St Aloysius' College, where he got to know Joseph Muscat, and received his Bachelor of Laws and Doctorate of Laws at the University of Malta.

He is married to Elena Farrugia, a notary, with whom he has a daughter.

=== Lawyer's practice ===
Edward Zammit Lewis served as President of the Labour Youth Forum (Forum Żgħażagħ Laburisti) for two consecutive years. In 1997, he was elected as local councillor for the Labour Party in Attard.

Until 2013, he practised as a lawyer at the Courts of Malta, including as a counsel to the Labour Party. Then party leader Joseph Muscat appointed Zammit Lewis to represent the party in the debate on the rent law reform amendments in 2009.

=== Member of Parliament and Minister ===
==== Muscat governments ====
At the March 2013 elections, won by the Labour Party, Zammit Lewis was elected a Member of Parliament for District 8. He was appointed Parliamentary Secretary for Competitiveness and Economic Growth.

From April 2014 till June 2017, he served as Minister for Tourism, also responsible for Air Malta (which Zammit Lewis unsuccessfully attempted to sell to Alitalia) and for the film industry in the 1st Muscat cabinet.

Zammit Lewis was re-elected at the 2017 election via a casual election following a seat vacancy on District 8. He was not re-appointed to Cabinet. In the following two years, his law firm received several direct orders from governmental bodies including Identity Malta, the Lands Authority, and the National Development and Social Fund. Zammit Lewis also served as consultant for then-energy minister Konrad Mizzi.

In July 2019, Zammit Lewis returned to Cabinet and was appointed Minister for European Affairs and Equality in the 2nd Muscat cabinet, replacing Helena Dalli who had been appointed European commissioner. During his tenure, Zammit Lewis employed Saviour Balzan as public relations manager.

==== Abela governments ====
From January 2020 till 2022, Zammit Lewis served as Minister for Justice, Governance and Equality in the government led by Robert Abela. During this tenure, Zammit Lewis oversaw the introduction of judicial reforms to comply with the recommendations of the Venice Commission to strengthen the rule of law.

Abela did not reappoint Zammit Lewis to government following the 2022 Maltese general election.

In June 2024, he was nominated by Robert Abela as judge for Malta at the EU General Court. In December 2024, the EU General Court rejected his nomination.

In October 2026, Zammit Lewis was appointed Commissioner of Laws by the Robert Abela cabinet, succeeding Antonio Mizzi. The position brings a remuneration of some €30,000 per year, as well as an official car and driver The commissioner of laws is responsible for reviewing and improving the consistency of Maltese legislation, including identifying legal provisions that may conflict with one another or with human rights protections.

== Controversies ==
Zammit Lewis is considered very close to former Maltese prime minister Joseph Muscat, whom he knows since the times of St Aloysius' College. He was part of Muscat's inner circle of aides, also accompanying the prime minister on family holidays, including a stay at a Hilton Hotel in France in 2017, which was paid for by Yorgen Fenech, later accused of masterminding the 2017 assassination of Daphne Caruana Galizia.

In January 2019, Zammit Lewis mocked Simon Busuttil's calls for an investigation into the company 17 Black in private messages to the company's owner Yorgen Fenech. In the messages, Zammit Lewis also mocked Labour Party supporters and referred to them as dim-witted (Maltese: ġaħan). After these messages were revealed to the public in 2021, the NGO Repubblika and the political party AD+PD called for Zammit Lewis' resignation, and Leader of the Opposition Bernard Grech announced his intention to call for a motion of no confidence in him in parliament. Zammit Lewis refused to resign, claiming he had already made public his acquaintance with Yorgen Fenech.

In September 2019, Yorgen Fenech offered Zammit Lewis to employ his supporters within his Tumas Group. Such arrangements had already occasionally taken place since 2014, when Zammit Lewis was minister of tourism. Zammit Lewis stated that this is a "normal practice among politicians" to help their constituents.
