= Marlene Mizzi =

Maltese politician

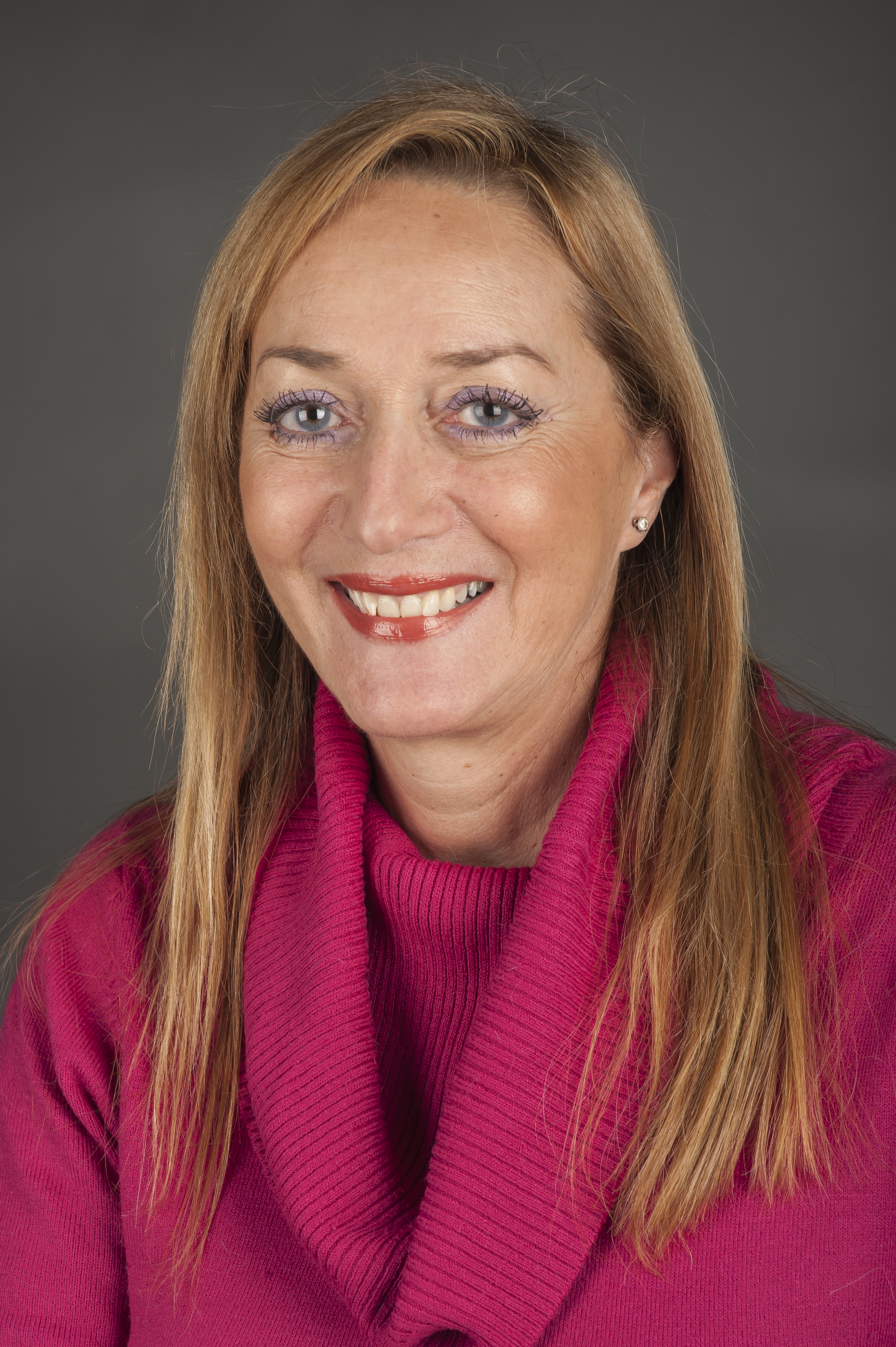

Member of the European Parliament for Malta
- In office 24 April 2013 – 2 July 2019
- Preceded by: Edward Scicluna

Personal details
- Born: 24 December 1954 (age 71) Rabat, Malta
- Party: Labour (PL)
- Website: mizzimarlene.com

Marlene Mizzi (born 24 December 1954, Rabat, Malta) is a Maltese politician and former Member of the European Parliament. She currently serves as the Maltese ambassador to Sweden and Norway. She was a member of the Labour Party and sat within the Progressive Alliance of Socialists and Democrats in the European Parliament. She served as an MEP between 2013 and 2019.

== Background ==
The daughter of John Cacciottolo and Josephine Micallef, she is married to Judge Emeritus Antonio Mizzi. They have one daughter, Alexandra, who is a lawyer and served as secretary of Film Finance Malta Ltd, the public company in charge of disbursing funds to the film industry.

Marlene Mizzi graduated with an honours degree in economics in 1976, continuing her studies at the Maastricht School of Management, where she read for a M.Phil. degree, specialising in corporate governance.

From 1997 to 2005, Marlene Mizzi served as Chairman of Sea Malta Co Ltd., Malta's national shipping line.

== Political career ==
On 24 April 2013, Mizzi was elected as Malta's first woman Member of the European Parliament, in a casual election, replacing Edward Scicluna. During her first year in parliament, she served as vice-chairwoman of the Committee on Economic and Monetary Affairs, under the leadership of chairwoman Sharon Bowles. Following the 2014 European elections, Mizzi became vice-chairwoman of the Committee on Petitions and a member of the Committee on the Internal Market and Consumer Protection. In 2016, she was named the parliament’s rapporteur on standardization.

Mizzi was a strong proponent of women's rights. In 2016 she hosted a women's rights discussion at American Embassy in Malta. She hosted a conference on female entrepreneurship in the European Parliament in Brussels. The goal of the conference was to promote inclusive female entrepreneurship and provide a better entrepreneurial environment for women.

Marlene Mizzi was a member of Group of the Progressive Alliance of Socialist and Democrats, a Vice-President of the Petitions Committee, a Member of the Internal Market and Consumer Protection Committee and substitute member of the Culture, Education and Sports Committee. In 2016-2017 Marlene Mizzi was an Ambassador for the Erasmus for Young Entrepreneurs Programme.

In addition to her committee assignments, Mizzi served as a member of the parliament’s delegation to the Parliamentary Assembly of the Mediterranean since 2013. She was also a member of the European Parliament Intergroup on the Welfare and Conservation of Animals.

Mizzi did not seek re-election to the Parliament in 2019.

In 2020, Mizzi was appointed as non-resident Ambassador of Malta to Sweden and Norway.
