= Administrative tribunals of Malta =

The administrative tribunals of Malta (or specialised tribunals) are a host of 40-50 adjudicatory bodies deciding on disputes involving the public administration of the Republic of Malta.

== Description ==
In addition to the ordinary courts, Malta has a number of tribunals dealing with various areas of administrative law, such as employment, immigration, competition, and social security. They are typically competent to hear appeals from decisions of administrative authorities. These tribunals include notably:

- Police Licenses Appeals Tribunal
- Prison Appeals Tribunal
- Building and Construction Tribunal
- International Protection Appeals Tribunal
- Industrial Tribunal
- Arbiter & Patents Tribunal
- Administrative Review Tribunal
- Information and Data Protection Appeals Tribunal
- Partition of Inheritances Tribunal
- Small Claims Tribunal
- Environment and Planning Review Tribunal
- Commercial Sanctions Tribunal
- Financial Services Tribunal
- Consumer Claims Tribunal

Many of these tribunals are appointed through a procedure involving the executive power, with chair and members of the tribunals appointed from among lawyers upon proposal of the Cabinet or of the competent Minister.

Some tribunals' decisions can be appealed on substance, and others only on point of law - usually to the Court of Appeal. Some administrative tribunals do not have further judicial review avenues, such as the Immigration Appeals Board; their decisions are final and cannot be appealed further, if not at constitutional level for breach of human rights.

In Elton Tajana v. Commissioner of Police (CA) (20 Jul 2020) (177/14), the Court of Appeal confirmed that Art.469A is to be interpreted in the sense that "only a final and binding decision... is subject to judicial review" of administrative action.

== Historical background ==
According to Tonio Borg, in a modern State not all disputes related to public administration can be referred to the Courts, and a certain number have been traditionally referred to "so-called administrative tribunals". In Malta, these included e.g. the Rent Regulation Board (1931) and the Rural Leases Control Board (1967).

In the United Kingdom, the 1957 Franks Committee report clarified that such organs with judicial powers should not be deemed as part of the public administration (subject to Government) but rather "regarded as machinery provided by the Parliament for adjudication", and therefore should conform to principles of openness, publicity of proceedings, reasoning behind decisions, fairness and equality of arms.

According to Borg, "the main attributes of [administrative] tribunals are that they are therefore independent from the administration, decising cases definitely between the parties, reaching a binding decision... Their procedure is as similar as pssible to that before a court of law and they have a permanent existence established by law".

== 2009 reform ==
Specialised tribunals in Malta proliferated over time, staffed by practising lawyers appointed by the Government.

In 2009, the Administrative Justice Act (AJA, chapter 490 of the Laws of Malta), drafted by prof. Kevin Aquilina, aimed at establishing common rules applicable to all tribunals, to ensure procedural fairness. According to Tonio Borg, the AJA may be deemed as "a statutory interpretation of the rules of natural justice that, by analogy, binds any public authority, officer or tribunal in deciding cases affecting the rights of any person".

The AJA also established an Administrative Review Tribunal (ART), chaired by a sitting or former member of the judiciary. The ART was meant to gradually take over and absorb the competence of the various specialised tribunals. However, this process was stalled in the following years. As a consequence, while the ART has acquired competence in the judicial review of the decisions of certain public authorities (e.g. Malta's Lands Authority), and certain tribunals have become obsolete (e.g. the Telecommunication Appeals Board and the Communications Appeals Board), most other administrative tribunals remain operative.

== Need for further reforms ==
In the following years, the work of several Maltese administrative tribunals was flagged as problematic in terms of both independence of their members, and quality of their decisions. This led to repeated interventions by the Courts to redirect the tribunals (in those cases where judicial review was allowed), or to repeated complaints by lawyers and civil society, up to appeals to Malta's Constitutional Court and to the European Court of Human Rights.

These issues concerned in particular the Industrial Tribunal, the Environment and Planning Review Tribunal (EPRT), the Public Contracts Review Board (PCRB) and the Financial Services Tribunal (FST), as well as the Immigration Appeals Board (IAB).

Industrial Tribunal

Newspapers reported that Industrial Tribunal chairpersons had abstained from hearing cases on 45 occasions in 2013, fuelling lawyers’ complaints that the tribunal lacked impartiality and made their clients feel disadvantaged. Six of the 10 tribunal chairpersons presiding over the various industrial tribunals were found to have direct or indirect links to the government and Malta's General Workers’ Union.

In 2023, the Union of Professional Educators argued that since all three members of the Industrial Tribunal were appointed by government entities and held other public officers, they were not independent or impartial. The members of the tribunal expressed concern about what they described as a “surprise attack” which “personally” targeted them and wrote to the President and Prime Minister to ask for “protection, help and assistance” after being personally identified.

Finally, in June 2015, Malta's Constitutional Court held that the composition of the Industrial Tribunalwas in breach of the principle guaranteeing a fair hearing, in particular as it had to always include a member representing the Government. Yet, legislative changes lagged behind. The law has been modified since.

Environment and Planning Review Tribunal (EPRT)

In 2020 it was revealed that the ‘independent’ tribunal tasked with hearing appeals against Planning Authority decisions had been chaired by a PA employee. Upon his appointment to the Environment and Planning Review Tribunal (EPRT) in June 2013, chairman Martin Saliba had reached an agreement with the PA that allowed him to stay on as an employee within the authority on unpaid leave. The agreement meant he could return to the PA on the same pay grade once his term on the tribunal was up. Veteran architects said they were incredulous to see Saliba’s dual role as both judge and an employee of the authority being judged. NGOs considered court appeals against EPRT rejected decisions between 2013 and 2019. In an editorial, the Times of Malta stated that “The potential conflict of interest in having an employee chair the tribunal set up to hear appeals filed, against decisions of his own employer, is plainly evident... The tribunal chairman’s potential conflict of interest should have been understood and flagged from the start.”

In 2022, a Planning Authority employee was transferred to the 'independent' planning appeals board with a written guarantee that he could return to the authority after his stint with the tribunal ended, raising conflict of interest concerns. A former EPRT chairman had also benefitted from a similar arrangement with the PA himself; his replacement also took up chairing the tribunal while being an authority employee on unpaid leave. Veteran architect Alex Torpiano questioned how the EPRT could even pretend to be independent with such arrangements in place. Lawyer Claire Bonello said the arrangement was a clear conflict of interest.

In 2023, experts noted that the Environment and Planning Review Tribunal too often misinterpreted the law, leading to several decisions being then overturned (months or years later) by the Law Courts. The Malta Independent noted that “The problems in the tribunal are clearly systemic.”

Public Contracts Review Board (PCRB)

In 2025, the opposition claimed that government changed secondary legislation via Legal Notice 47 of 2025 to permit the Prime Minister to discretionarily appoint additional PCRB board members, creating risks of political manipulation and undermining the board's independence. The reports also referred to judicial concerns about conflicts of interest in procurement appeals. The government claimed that such changes only aimed at preventing delays and took into account potential conflicts of interest.

Financial Services Tribunal (FST)

In 2026, Malta's Constitutional Courts found that the Financial Services Tribunal failed the test of independence and impartiality because its members are appointed by the finance minister for three-year terms, with no security of tenure. The tribunal also lacks full jurisdiction, and any further appeal from a tribunal decision to Law Courts is limited to points of law.

Immigration Appeals Board (IAB)

In October 2024, the European Court of Human Rights established that the Immigration Appeals Board - and by extension all other similarly composed specialised tribunals - does not have the required independence and impartiality to be considered as a court of law. Key findings included the lack of a proper appointment procedure of its members and the absence of selection criteria based on merit. The Court found that Malta will need to enact legislation to bring the Immigration Appeals Board in conformity with the standards of independence and impartiality as stipulated by the European Convention on Human Rights.

== 2026 reform ==
The Venice Commission flagged already in 2018 that specialised tribunals do not enjoy the same level of judicial independence as the ordinary judiciary, which risks being undermined by their expansion, with the danger of parallel jurisdictions."

In the context of the October 2021 EU Recovery and Resilience Plan (RRP), Malta committed to a review of the independence of specialised tribunals, including as regards the involvement of the executive in the appointment of their members. In May 2026, the Government submitted a draft bill to the Venice Commission, which issued an urgent opinion in July 2026. The reform would apply to 13 administrative tribunals: the Environment and Planning Review Tribunal, the Consumer Claims Tribunal, the Commercial Sanctions Tribunal, the Industrial Tribunal, the Information and Data Protection Appeals Tribunal, the Patents Tribunal, the Police Licences Appeals Tribunal, the Prison Appeals Tribunal, the Building and Construction Tribunal, the International Protection Appeals Tribunal, the Inheritance Partition Tribunal, the Small Claims Tribunal and the Financial Services Tribunal. The Venice Commission put forward seven key recommendations, notably regretting the limited scope of the reform, which ‘would mean that the majority of existing administrative tribunals in Malta would not be covered by the new appointment regime' (§60).

The Maltese government amended the draft bill, taking into account certain recommendations from the Venice Commission, notably as regards the composition of the appointment commission. The Venice Commission, in its urgent opinion, noted that these amendments “appear to address several important concerns” and “represent a significant step in the right direction”, while listing a series of elements on which “further analysis of the administrative justice system will be required” to “review how these current reforms operate in practice” (§96).

Legislative amendments were adopted on 27 July 2026, providing that appointments to principal administrative tribunals shall be made by the President of Malta acting on the advice of an independent commission. The reform applies to 13 tribunals, and does not address the issue of judicial review of decisions of these tribunals.

On 9 October 2026, the Commission for Appointments and Discipline within Administrative Tribunals was appointed by the President of Malta on the advice of the Cabinet. It will be chaired by former judge Antonio Mizzi, alongside Joseph M. Buttigieg, Christine Schembri, David Matrenza and Tonio Portughese.

== List of administrative tribunals in Malta ==
Other Administrative tribunals not listed in the Administrative Justice Act
No.	Name of tribunal	Legal basis	Membership	Judicial review	Status	Notes
0	Administrative Review Tribunal (ART)	Administrative Justice Act	The ART chair must be a sitting or former member of the judiciary and their removal is subject to safeguards comparable to those applying to a magistrate. The ART chair is appointed upon the Prime Minister’s advice, and the appointment of his two assistants is not subject to a public call. ART panels are chaired since February 2026 by five magistrates: Victor Axiak, Brigitte Sultana, Joseph Gatt, Claudio Zammit and Franca Giordmaina. They were joined in July 2026 by Natalino Caruana Debrincat.		Active	The ART reviews decisions taken by the Maltese public administration in a broad range of areas, such as tax assessments, licensing and regulatory matters.
1	Building and Construction Tribunal	Building and Construction Authority Act (Cap.623)	Dr Christopher Louis Vella, Chair; Arch. Samuel Formosa and Inġ. Johann Psaila, members; effective 10 November 2024 for three years			Subject to the 2026 reform
2	Commercial Sanctions Tribunal	Public Procurement Regulations (S.L. 601.03)				Subject to the 2026 reform
3	Patents Tribunal (formerly Arbiter & Patents Tribunal)	Art.58A of the Patents and Designs Act (Cap. 417)				Included in the 2026 reform
4	Competition and Consumer Appeals Tribunal					Formerly Commission for Fair Trading. Abolished in 2019; its functions were transferred to the Civil Court. Still listed in the 2018 Venice Commission Opinion

Administrative tribunals listed in the First Schedule to Malta's Administrative Justice Act
No.	Name of tribunal	Legal basis	Membership	Judicial review	Status	Notes
1	Commission (Marriage Legacies)	Marriage Legacies Act (Cap. 3), art. 3	As provided by the enabling Act; composition not specified in the AJA Schedule.	No general appeal route established by the Schedule; check the enabling Act and the applicability of judicial review under article 469A of Cap. 12.	To be verified	Part A.
2	Board (Lepers Ordinance)	Lepers Ordinance (Cap. 45), art. 2(8)	As provided by the Ordinance.	The Second Schedule identifies inferior appellate competence for the Lepers Ordinance; see also the applicable statutory provisions.	Historical; operation to be verified	Part A.
3	Rent Regulation Board	Reletting of Urban Property (Regulation) Ordinance (Cap. 69), art. 16	Chaired by a magistrate; appointments and constitution are governed by the enabling legislation.	Statutory remedies depend on the applicable tenancy legislation; ordinary judicial review is distinct from an appeal on the merits.	Active	Chaired by Magistrate Natalino Caruana Debrincat since July 2026.
4	Communications Appeal Board	Utilities and Services (Regulation of Certain Works) Act (Cap. 81), art. 4	As provided by the legislation establishing the Malta Communications Authority and the Board.	Statutory appeal/review route depends on the applicable communications legislation.	To be verified	Part A; the Schedule cross-refers to the Communications Appeal Board.
5	Board of Reference	Agricultural Produce (Export) Ordinance (Cap. 85), art. 18; Potato Export Regulations (S.L. 85.01), reg. 27	As prescribed by the subsidiary legislation.	Depends on the applicable export regulations; the Schedule does not specify a general route.	To be verified	Listed under primary and subsidiary legislation.
6	Land Arbitration Board	Land Acquisition (Public Purposes) Ordinance (Cap. 88), art. 23; Government Lands Act (Cap. 573)	Chaired by a magistrate under the current land legislation.	Statutory remedies depend on the applicable land-acquisition regime; judicial review is a separate question.	Active	Chaired by Magistrate Natalino Caruana Debrincat since July 2026.
7	General Services Board	Department of Health (Constitution) Ordinance (Cap. 94), art. 44	As prescribed by the Ordinance.	No general appeal route established by the AJA Schedule; verify the enabling legislation.	To be verified	Part A.
8	Board of Special Commissioners for Land Valuation	Developed Land Valuation Ordinance (Cap. 110), art. 9	As prescribed by the enabling legislation.	Specific appeal and review provisions require confirmation from the operative legislation.	To be verified	Part A.
9	Boards or tribunals for offences under subsidiary legislation	Supplies and Services Act (Cap. 117), art. 3(1)(e)	Depends on the subsidiary legislation establishing the particular body.	Depends on the particular enabling instrument and offence.	Instrument-specific	A category of bodies rather than one uniquely named tribunal.
10	Rent Regulation Board	Housing Act (Cap. 125), arts. 8(6) and 12(1)	See entry 3.	See entry 3; the applicable tenancy provision determines the remedy.	Active	A separate Schedule entry referring to the same Board.
11	Police Board	Police Act (Cap. 164), art. 48	As prescribed by the applicable Police Act.	The applicable statutory appeal and judicial-review provisions must be checked.	To be verified	Not to be confused with the Police Licences Appeals Tribunal.
12	Ports Disputes Board	Port Workers Ordinance (Cap. 171), arts. 10 and 12	As prescribed by the Ordinance.	No general route specified in the Schedule; check the operative provisions.	Historical; operation to be verified	Part A.
13	Board of Custodians	Enemy Property Act (Cap. 179), art. 4	As prescribed by the Act.	The Second Schedule identifies inferior appellate competence for the Enemy Property Act; verify the relevant appeal provision.	To be verified	Part A.
14	Rural Leases Control Board	Agricultural Leases (Reletting) Act (Cap. 199), art. 5	Adrian Bugeja Douglas, Ryan Cilia and Dr Charles Grech added to the list of persons competent in agricultural matters, for two years until 18 April 2026	Statutory appeal or review depends on the applicable provision.	To be verified	Part A.
15	Financial Services Tribunal	Central Bank of Malta Act (Cap. 204), art. 36A	Composition and appointment are governed by the applicable financial-services legislation.	Statutory appeal provisions apply under the relevant financial-services law; the precise route is enactment-specific.	Active; verify current jurisdiction. The same tribunal appears under several enactments.	In Feb 2024, the Minister for Finance and Employment appointed Ian Stafrace as Chair and Nicholas Valenzia and Joseph Azzopardi as members for three years.
16	Authority established under subsidiary legislation (disabled persons' employment)	Disabled Persons Employment Act (Cap. 210), art. 13	As provided by the relevant subsidiary legislation.	The Schedule describes an appeal to an authority; the exact procedure depends on the subsidiary legislation.	To be verified	The Schedule does not give the authority a distinct tribunal name.
17	Public Transport Labour Board	Public Transport (Regulation of Employment) Act (Cap. 214), art. 3	As prescribed by the applicable transport and employment legislation.	Statutory remedies depend on the operative transport legislation.	To be verified	The Schedule refers to the Board established under the Malta Transport Authority Act.
18	Immigration Appeals Board	Immigration Act (Cap. 217), art. 25A	The Board operates through statutory divisions; composition is governed by the Immigration Act and the Immigration Appeals Board (Division) Regulations.	The statutory appeal is governed by the Immigration Act; judicial review and constitutional remedies are separate questions.	Active	Subject of the 2024 ECtHR ruling in J.B. v. Malta, yet to be implemented. Division regulations were amended in 2025.
19	Aviation Safety Board	Civil Aviation (Air Operators Certificate) Act (Cap. 218), art. 9	As prescribed by the aviation legislation.	Specific appeal and review provisions require confirmation from the operative legislation.	To be verified	Part A.
20	Communications Appeals Board	Post Office Act (Cap. 254), art. 28	As prescribed by the communications legislation.	Statutory appeal/review depends on the applicable postal or communications provision.	To be verified	A 2025 draft bill proposed deleting the AJA Schedule reference as the body “no longer operates.”
21	Mental Health Review Tribunal	Mental Health Act (Cap. 262), art. 38			Abolished in October 2014 by the updated Mental Health Act (Cap. 525 of the Laws of Malta). Its functions were subsumed by the Commissioner for Mental Health	Still listed in the AJA First schedule, Part A.
22	Building Price Control Tribunal	Building (Price Control) Act (Cap. 288), art. 9	As prescribed by the Act.	No general appeal route specified by the AJA Schedule; check the enabling Act.	To be verified	Part A.
23	Commissioners for Justice	Commissioners for Justice Act (Cap. 291), art. 3	Commissioners are selected from persons holding a law degree and appointed for three-year terms.	Appeals from decisions are possible on points of law.	Active	The Courts of Justice confirms the qualifications, term and appeal route.
24	Partition of Inheritances Tribunal	Partition of Inheritances Act (Cap. 308), art. 4	As prescribed by the Act.	The applicable statutory appeal and judicial-review routes require confirmation.	To be verified	Part A.
25	Umpire	Social Security Act (Cap. 318), arts. 107 and 128	As prescribed by the social-security legislation.	Statutory remedies depend on the relevant social-security provision.	To be verified	Part A.
26	Appeals Board	Business Promotion Act (Cap. 325), art. 28	As prescribed by the Act.	Statutory appeal/review depends on the applicable provision.	To be verified	The Schedule also refers to this Board under the Malta Freeports Act.
27	Scholastic Tribunal	Education Act (Cap. 327), art. 42	As prescribed by the Education Act.	The Second Schedule identifies inferior appellate competence for the Education Act; verify the applicable right of appeal.	To be verified	Part A.
28	Financial Services Tribunal	Malta Financial Services Authority Act (Cap. 330), art. 21	As prescribed by the financial-services legislation.	Statutory appeal provisions apply under the relevant enactment.	Active; verify current jurisdiction	Same tribunal as entry 15.
29	Financial Services Tribunal	Trusts and Trustees Act (Cap. 331), art. 55	As prescribed by the relevant legislation.	Statutory appeal provisions apply under the relevant enactment.	Active; verify current jurisdiction	Same tribunal as entry 15.
30	Public Transport Labour Board	Malta Transport Authority Act (Cap. 332), art. 30	As prescribed by the applicable transport legislation.	Statutory remedies depend on the operative transport law.	To be verified	Same Board as entry 17.
31	Appeals Board under the Business Promotion Act	Malta Freeports Act (Cap. 334), art. 29(2)	The Board constituted under article 28 of the Business Promotion Act.	Depends on the statutory appeal provision applicable to the decision.	To be verified	The Schedule expressly cross-refers to the Business Promotion Act Board.
32	Customs Valuations Appeals Board	Import Duties Act (Cap. 337), art. 9	As prescribed by the Act.	The Second Schedule identifies inferior appellate competence for the Import Duties Act; check the relevant appeal provisions.	To be verified	Part A.
33	National Employment Authority	Employment and Training Services Act (Cap. 343), art. 3	As prescribed by the Act.	No general appeal route specified in the Schedule; verify the operative employment legislation.	To be verified	Part A.
34	Financial Services Tribunal	Financial Markets Act (Cap. 345), art. 42	As prescribed by the financial-services legislation.	Statutory appeal provisions apply under the relevant enactment.	Active; verify current jurisdiction	Same tribunal as entry 15.
35	Environment and Planning Review Tribunal (EPRT)	Development Planning Act (Cap. 356), art. 15; Environment Protection Act (Cap. 435), art. 16	In January 2025 Joseph Borg was appointed Chair and Alicia Borg appointed member for five years. In May 2026, Alexander Zammit was appointed to the Supplementary Panel for five years.		Active	Listed in the AJA as Planning Appeals Board. PAB renamed EPRT after the 2010 reform (EPRT Act Cap. 551). AJA not updated. Subject to the 2026 reform
36	Board of Special Commissioners for Duty on Documents and Transfers	Duty on Documents and Transfers Act (Cap. 364), art. 57	As prescribed by the tax legislation.	The Second Schedule sets out appellate competence and monetary thresholds for this jurisdiction.	To be verified	Part A.
37	Financial Services Tribunal	Investment Services Act (Cap. 370), art. 19	As prescribed by the financial-services legislation.	Statutory appeal provisions apply under the relevant enactment.	Active; verify current jurisdiction	Same tribunal as entry 15.
38	Financial Services Tribunal	Banking Act (Cap. 371), art. 10	As prescribed by the financial-services legislation.	Statutory appeal provisions apply under the relevant enactment.	Active; verify current jurisdiction	Same tribunal as entry 15.
39	Board of Special Commissioners for Income Tax purposes	Income Tax Management Act (Cap. 372), art. 34	As prescribed by the tax legislation.	Statutory appeal provisions apply; consult the Income Tax Management Act and the Second Schedule to the AJA.	To be verified	Part A.
40	Financial Services Tribunal	Financial Institutions Act (Cap. 376), art. 21	As prescribed by the financial-services legislation.	Statutory appeal provisions apply under the relevant enactment.	Active; verify current jurisdiction	Same tribunal as entry 15.
41	Consumer Claims Tribunal	Consumer Affairs Act (Cap. 378), art. 16	Composition and appointment are governed by the Consumer Affairs Act.	Statutory appeal provisions apply as specified by the Act.	To be verified	Part A.
42	Small Claims Tribunal	Small Claims Tribunal Act (Cap. 380), art. 3	Presided over by an adjudicator appointed from among advocates for a five-year term.	Appeal lies to the Court of Appeal in the cases specified by the Act.	Active	The Courts of Justice confirms the composition and appeal route.
43	Appeals Board	Controlled Companies (Procedures for Liquidations) Act (Cap. 383), art. 7	As prescribed by the Act.	Specific appeal provisions require confirmation from the operative legislation.	To be verified	Part A.
44	Commissioner	Private Guards and Community Officers Act (Cap. 389), art. 11	A statutory commissioner; composition is not specified in the AJA Schedule.	Depends on the relevant statutory decision and appeal provisions.	To be verified	The Schedule names a Commissioner rather than a multi-member tribunal.
45	Excise Tax Tribunal	Customs and Excise Tax Act (Cap. 395), art. 47	As prescribed by the Act.	Specific statutory appeal and judicial-review provisions require confirmation.	To be verified	Part A.
46	Communications Appeals Board	Electronics Communications (Regulation) Act (Cap. 399), art. 16	As prescribed by the communications legislation.	Statutory appeal/review depends on the applicable communications provision.	To be verified	Same communications appeal body as entries 4 and 20.
47	Financial Services Tribunal	Insurance Business Act (Cap. 403), art. 35	As prescribed by the financial-services legislation.	Statutory appeal provisions apply under the relevant enactment.	Active; verify current jurisdiction	Same tribunal as entry 15.
48	Value Added Tax Appeals Board	Value Added Tax Act (Cap. 406), art. 43	As prescribed by the VAT legislation.	Statutory appeal provisions apply under the Act; further review depends on the applicable law.	To be verified	Part A.
49	Tourism Appeals Board	Malta Travel and Tourism Services Act (Cap. 409), art. 13	As prescribed by the Act.	Specific appeal and review provisions require confirmation from the operative legislation.	To be verified	Part A.
50	International Protection Appeals Tribunal (IPAT)	International Protection Act (Cap. 420), art. 5	A full-time chairperson and at least two part-time members; statutory qualifications and appointment requirements apply.	The Tribunal hears statutory appeals, including appeals on facts and law in specified cases; further remedies depend on the applicable law.	Active	Until 2020 (Cap.420) known as Refugees Appeals Board.
51	Resources Appeals Board	Malta Resources Authority Act (Cap. 423), art. 32	As prescribed by the applicable legislation.	Statutory appeal/review depends on the relevant resources-regulation provisions.	To be verified	Check subsequent changes to the resources regulatory framework.
52	Health and Safety Tribunal	Occupational Health and Safety Authority Act (Cap. 424), art. 21		Specific statutory appeal and judicial-review provisions require confirmation.		Listed in AJA First Schedule, Part A, as Occupational Health and Safety Appeals Board. Reformed in 2024 as Health and Safety Tribunal
54	Appeals Board	Wine Act (Cap. 436), art. 4	As prescribed by the Act.	Specific appeal and review provisions require confirmation.	To be verified	Part A.
55	Information and Data Protection Appeals Tribunal	Data Protection Act (Cap. 440), art. 48	In August 2023, Anna Mallia was appointed Chair, Noel Camilleri as Substitute Chair, and Charles Cassar and David Bezzina as members, for three years.			Listed in AJA First Schedule under the old name of Data Protection Appeals Tribunal
56	Licensing Appeals Board	Trading Licences Act (Cap. 441), art. 8				Part A.
57	Co-operatives Board	Co-operative Societies Act (Cap. 442), art. 3	As prescribed by the Act.	Specific statutory remedies require confirmation.	To be verified	Part A.
58	Producer Organisations Appeals Board	Producer Organisations Act (Cap. 447), art. 18	As prescribed by the Act.	Specific statutory appeal and judicial-review provisions require confirmation.	To be verified	Part A.
59	Financial Services Tribunal	Special Funds (Regulation) Act (Cap. 450), art. 54	As prescribed by the financial-services legislation.	Statutory appeal provisions apply under the relevant enactment.	Active; verify current jurisdiction	Part B; same tribunal as entry 15.
60	Mutual Recognition of Qualifications Appeals Board	Mutual Recognition of Qualifications Act (Cap. 451), art. 7	As prescribed by the Act.	Statutory appeal and judicial-review provisions require confirmation.	To be verified	Part B.
61	Industrial Tribunal	Employment and Industrial Relations Act (Cap. 452), art. 73	Chairs (appointed by the Prime Minister): Joseph Delia, Doreen Parnis, Edmund Tabone and Harold Walls, effective 12 November 2025 for five years. Panel members representing employers and workers appointed in April 2026.	The statutory appeal route is governed by the Employment and Industrial Relations Act; it is not interchangeable with general judicial review.	Active	In Nov 2025, PM Robert Abela appointed Joseph Delia, Doreen Parnis, Edmund Tabone and Harold Walls as chairs for five years.
62	Sports Appeals Board	Sports Act (Cap. 455), art. 47	As prescribed by the Act.	Specific statutory appeal and judicial-review provisions require confirmation.	To be verified	Part B.
63	Medicines Review Board	Medicines Act (Cap. 458), art. 21	As prescribed by the Act.	The Schedule identifies an appeal to the Board from findings of the Medicines Authority; further review depends on the applicable law.	To be verified	Part B.
64	Eco-Contribution Appeals Board	Eco-Contribution Act (Cap. 473), art. 26	As prescribed by the Act.	Statutory appeal and judicial-review provisions require confirmation.	To be verified	Part B.
65	Financial Services Tribunal	Prevention of Financial Markets Abuse Act (Cap. 476), art. 23	As prescribed by the financial-services legislation.	Statutory appeal provisions apply under the relevant enactment.	Active; verify current jurisdiction	Same tribunal as entry 15.
66	Financial Services Tribunal	Securitisation Act (Cap. 484), art. 19(14)	As prescribed by the financial-services legislation.	Statutory appeal provisions apply under the relevant enactment.	Active; verify current jurisdiction	Same tribunal as entry 15.
67	Financial Services Tribunal	Insurance Intermediaries Act (Cap. 487), art. 2	The cited statutory entry is repealed by Act XV of 2009.	No current appeal route should be inferred from this repealed entry.	Repealed entry	The AJA Schedule expressly records the repeal.
68	Board of Film and Stage Censors	Cinema and Stage Regulations (GN 430 of 28 September 1937), reg. 42	As prescribed by the applicable regulations.	The current appeal and review provisions require confirmation.	Historical status to be verified	Part B.
69	Appeals body under the Civil Explosives Regulations	Civil Explosives Regulations (S.L. 33.04), Second Schedule, paragraph 5 of Module B	The Schedule requires provision for an appeal but does not identify a distinct named tribunal.	Depends on the appeal mechanism prescribed by the applicable regulations.	Unclear	Part B.
70	Board of Reference	Potato Export Regulations (S.L. 85.01), reg. 27	As prescribed by the Regulations.	Depends on the applicable export regulations.	To be verified	Same Board as entry 5.
71	Police Licences Appeals Tribunal	Licences Procedures Regulations (S.L. 128.02), reg. 6	As prescribed by the Regulations.	Statutory appeal and any subsequent judicial review depend on the applicable licensing legislation.	To be verified	Part B.
72	Public Contracts Appeals Board	Public Service (Procurement) Regulations (S.L. 174.02), reg. 15	As prescribed by the applicable procurement regulations.	The applicable procurement appeal framework must be consulted.	Successor/current status to be verified	Read alongside the Public Contracts Review Board entry.
73	Public Contracts Review Board	Public Procurement Regulations (S.L. 174.04), reg. 34	Composition is governed by the applicable procurement legislation.	Statutory procurement-review and appeal mechanisms apply.	Current status to be verified	Part B.
74	Postal Services Appeals Board	Postal Services Appeals Board (Rules of Procedure) Regulations (S.L. 254.12)	As prescribed by the applicable regulations.	Specific appeal and review route requires confirmation.	To be verified	Part B.
75	Appeals Tribunal (prisons)	Prison Regulations (S.L. 260.03), reg. 79	As prescribed by the Prison Regulations.	Specific statutory appeal and review provisions require confirmation.	To be verified	Part B.
76	Petitions Board	Petitions (Local Tribunals) Regulations (S.L. 291.04), reg. 3	As prescribed by the Regulations.	Specific appeal and review provisions require confirmation.	To be verified	Part B.
77	University Disciplinary Board	Assessment Test Regulations (S.L. 327.85), reg. 6	As prescribed by the Regulations.	University-specific appeal and judicial-review provisions require confirmation.	To be verified	Part B.
78	Tribunal under the Licensing of Private Medical Clinics Regulations	Licensing of Private Medical Clinics Regulations (S.L. 458.23), reg. 5(2)	As prescribed by regulation 5(2).	Specific appeal and review provisions require confirmation.	To be verified	Part B.
79	Tribunal for private medical diagnostic laboratories	Licensing of Private Medical Diagnostic Laboratories Regulations (S.L. 458.25), reg. 5(2)	The tribunal appointed under regulation 5(2) of S.L. 458.23.	Specific appeal and review provisions require confirmation.	To be verified	Cross-refers to the tribunal listed in entry 78.
80	Authority for Transport in Malta	Placing of Billboards and Advertising on the Road Regulations (S.L. 499.32), reg. 9A	The Schedule names the Authority for Transport in Malta, rather than a separately named tribunal.	The applicable administrative and court-review routes require confirmation.	Active authority; tribunal classification unclear	Included because it is expressly listed in Part B of the First Schedule.
