= Commissioner of Laws =

- Coat of Arms of the Republic of Malta
- Incumbent; Edward Zammit Lewis since 16 October 2026
- Appointer: Joseph Muscat as the Prime Minister of Malta

The Commissioner of Laws (also Commissioner of Law and Commissioner for Laws) is an office in Malta that was established by the 1980 Revisions of Statutory Laws Act.

The first commissioner was Franco Debono, whose appointment was widely publicised in the Maltese media. His appointment by the Labour led administration was lambasted by the Leader of the Opposition Lawrence Gonzi, as his party was not consulted beforehand while others argued Debono's past as a rebel MP should have motivated the government to pick a "more unifying figure."

According to Labour MP Owen Bonnici in 2013, the responsibilities of the post include working to remove conflicting, unconstitutional and human rights-breaching laws.

In June 2019, former judge Antonio Mizzi was appointed by the government to succeed Debono.

In October 2026, Edward Zammit Lewis replaced Mizzi.

== See also ==
- Law commission
