= Victor Axiak =

Maltese judge

Victor George Axiak (born 20 August 1981) is a Maltese Magistrate.

== Studies and lawyer's practice ==
Axiak graduated as a lawyer in 2005 and continued his studies in taxation law at the University of Malta. He then practised as a private lawyer in commercial and civil law.

== Judicial career ==
Axiak was appointed to the magistracy in 2019 and has presided over cases involving criminal proceedings, legal professional obligations and the interpretation of laws governing court proceedings.

In a May 2022 case, Axiak dismissed contempt-of-court proceedings against editors of Malta Today, and called on the Parliament to update the relevant legislation as “In the year 2022, it hardly makes sense that an order banning publication be publicised only by being affixed to the door of the courtroom.” “The court feels that at least such an order should be formally served on our country’s media companies.” “Even better would be a system where the general public would be made aware of the Court’s order… by having it published on the court website and, if necessary, in leading newspapers.”

In two 2022 cases, Axiak ruled that Malta's Law Enforcement System Agency (LESA) should have been issuing fines against e-scooter companies' representatives in their professional rather than in their personal capacity. This led to hundreds of parking tickets being struck off the system. The ruling was deemed as likely to set a precedent and to be applicable to all categories of motor vehicles.

In two libel judgments from 2023, Axiak ruled in favour of former minister Konrad Mizzi and former communications coordinator Lindsey Gambin in cases concerning a blog post by the late journalist Daphne Caruana Galizia, awarding each claimant €1,000 in damages, although the magistrate recognised that it was “difficult if not impossible” for Caruana Galizia’s heirs to corroborate the story after her death, not knowing her sources.

In a February 2026 ruling (Brannon v. Montalto), Axiak highlighted that the absence of regulated tariffs for criminal legal fees in Malta has, over the years, given rise to “excesses and serious abuses by a minority of unscrupulous lawyers who bite much more than they can chew”.

In February 2026, together with four other magistrates, Axiak was appointed by the Maltese government to chair the panels of the Administrative Review Tribunal.

== See also ==
- Judiciary of Malta
