= 2003 Maltese general election =

← 1998	12 April 2003	2008 →

All 65 seats in the House of Representatives 33 seats needed for a majority
- Turnout: 96.95%
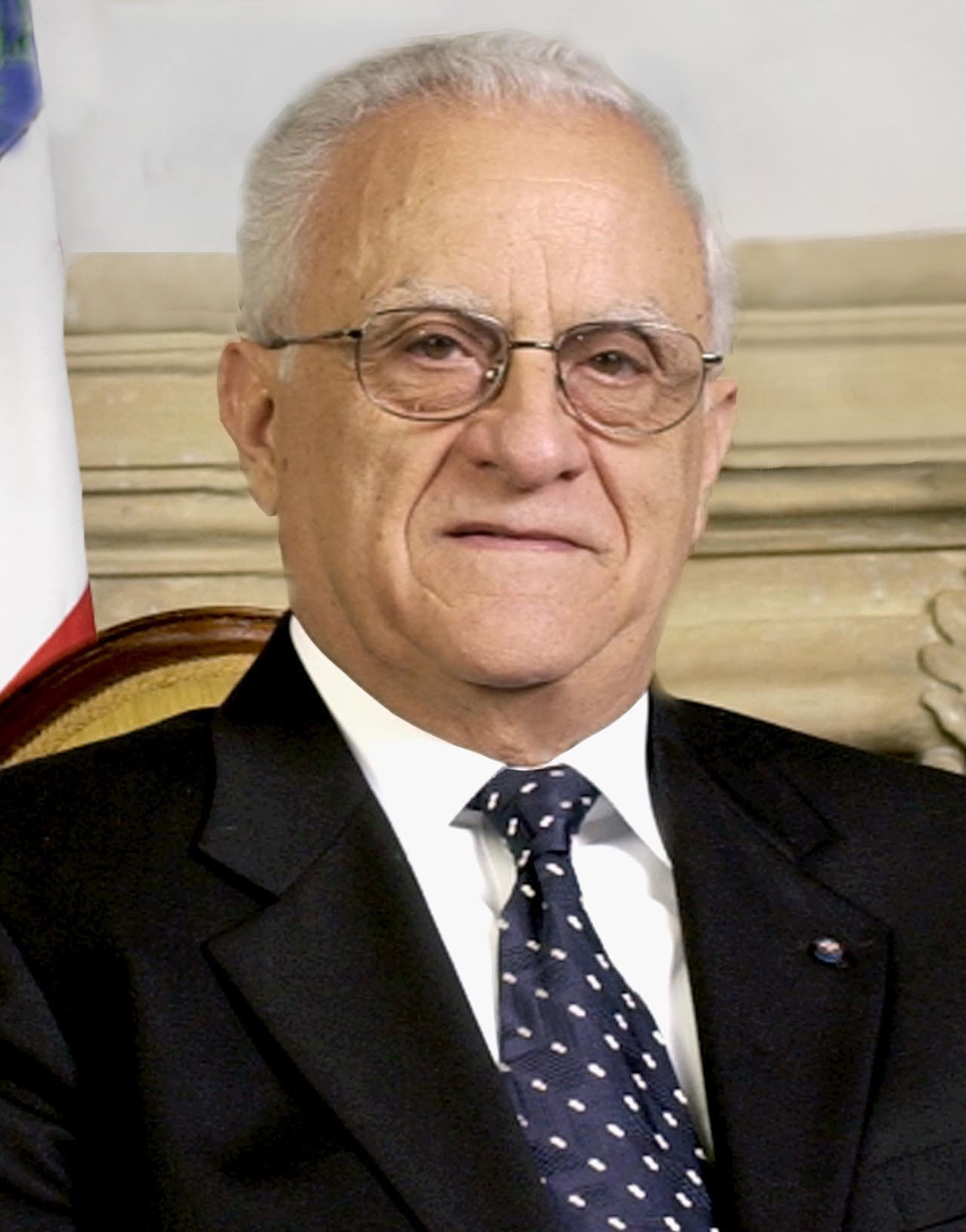

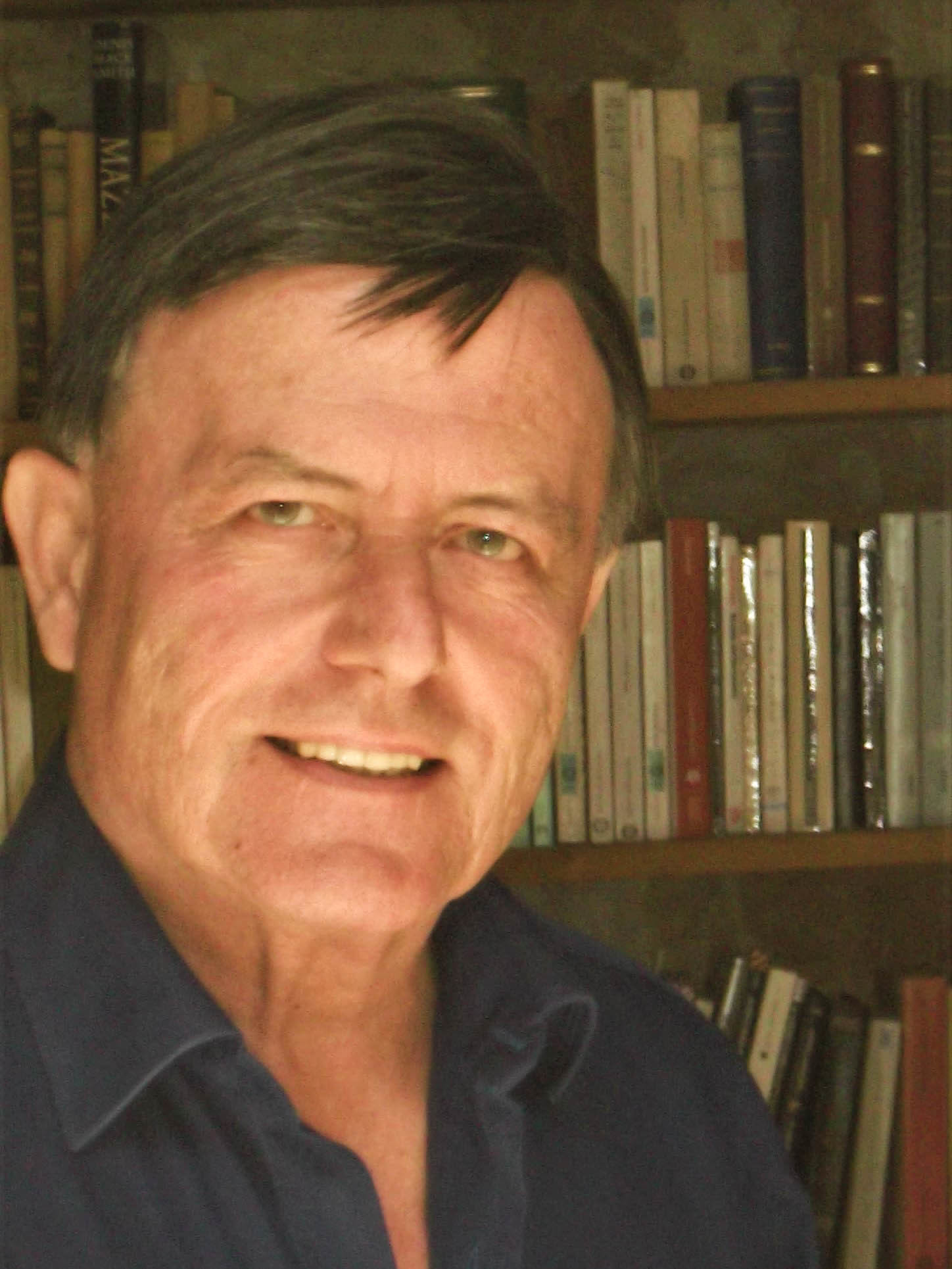
	First party	Second party
Leader	Eddie Fenech Adami	Alfred Sant
Party	Nationalist	Labour
Last election	51.81%, 35 seats	46.97%, 30 seats
Seats won	35	30
Seat change	Steady	Steady
Popular vote	146,172	134,092
Percentage	51.79%	47.51%
Swing	▼0.02pp	▲0.54pp
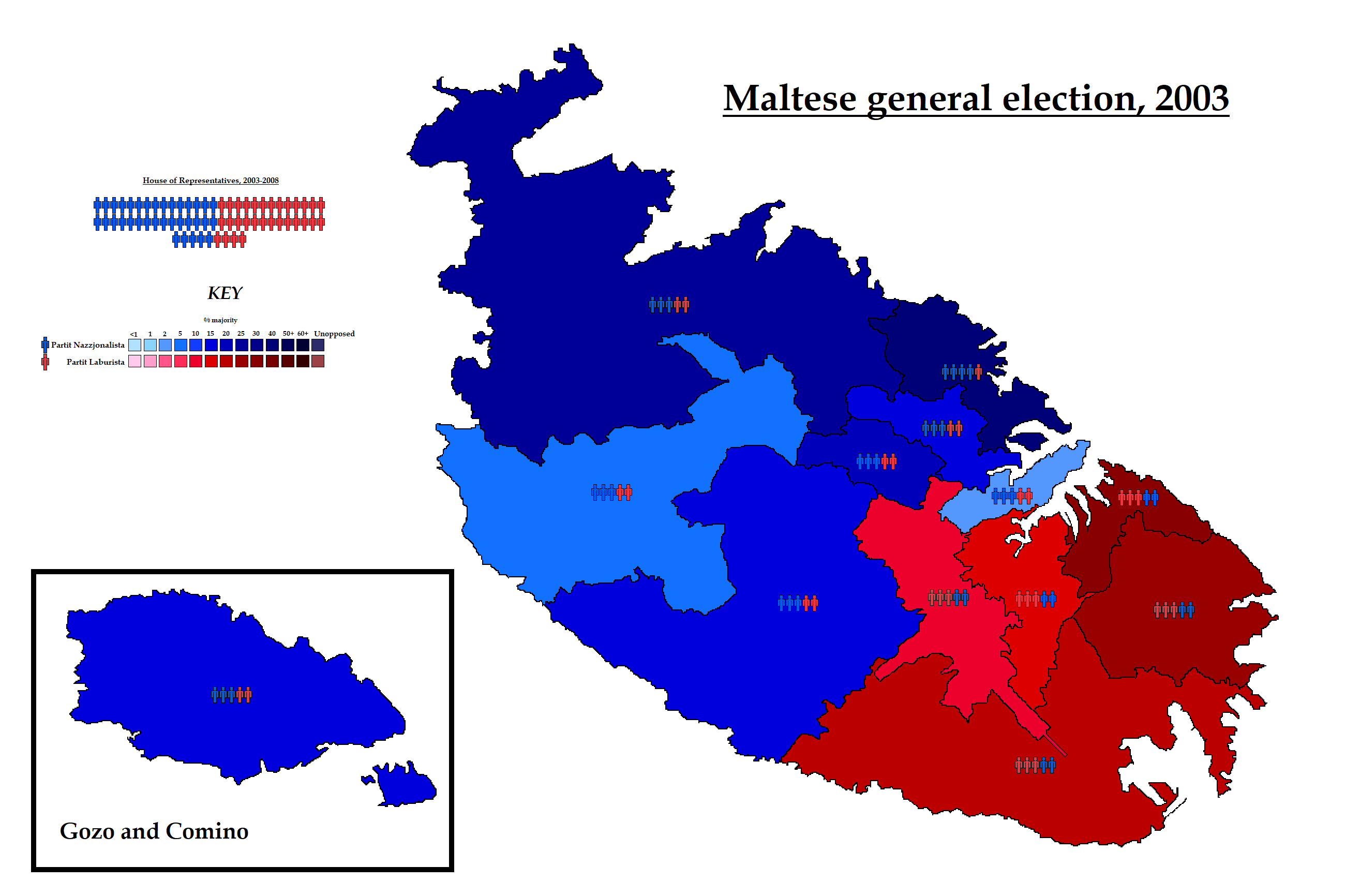
Prime Minister before election
Eddie Fenech Adami
Nationalist
Elected Prime Minister
Eddie Fenech Adami
Nationalist

General elections were held in Malta on 12 April 2003. The result was a victory for the Nationalist Party, which won 35 of the 65 seats in Parliament.

== MPs who stood down ==
- Rita Law (Labour Party)

== Results ==
Party	Votes	%	Seats	+/–
Nationalist Party	146,172	51.79	35	0
Malta Labour Party	134,092	47.51	30	0
Democratic Alternative	1,929	0.68	0	0
Independents	20	0.01	0	0
Total	282,213	100.00	65	0
Valid votes	282,213	98.98		
Invalid/blank votes	2,909	1.02		
Total votes	285,122	100.00		
Registered voters/turnout	294,106	96.95		
Source: Nohlen & Stöver
