= 1998 Maltese general election =

← 1996	5 September 1998	2003 →

All 65 seats in the House of Representatives 33 seats needed for a majority
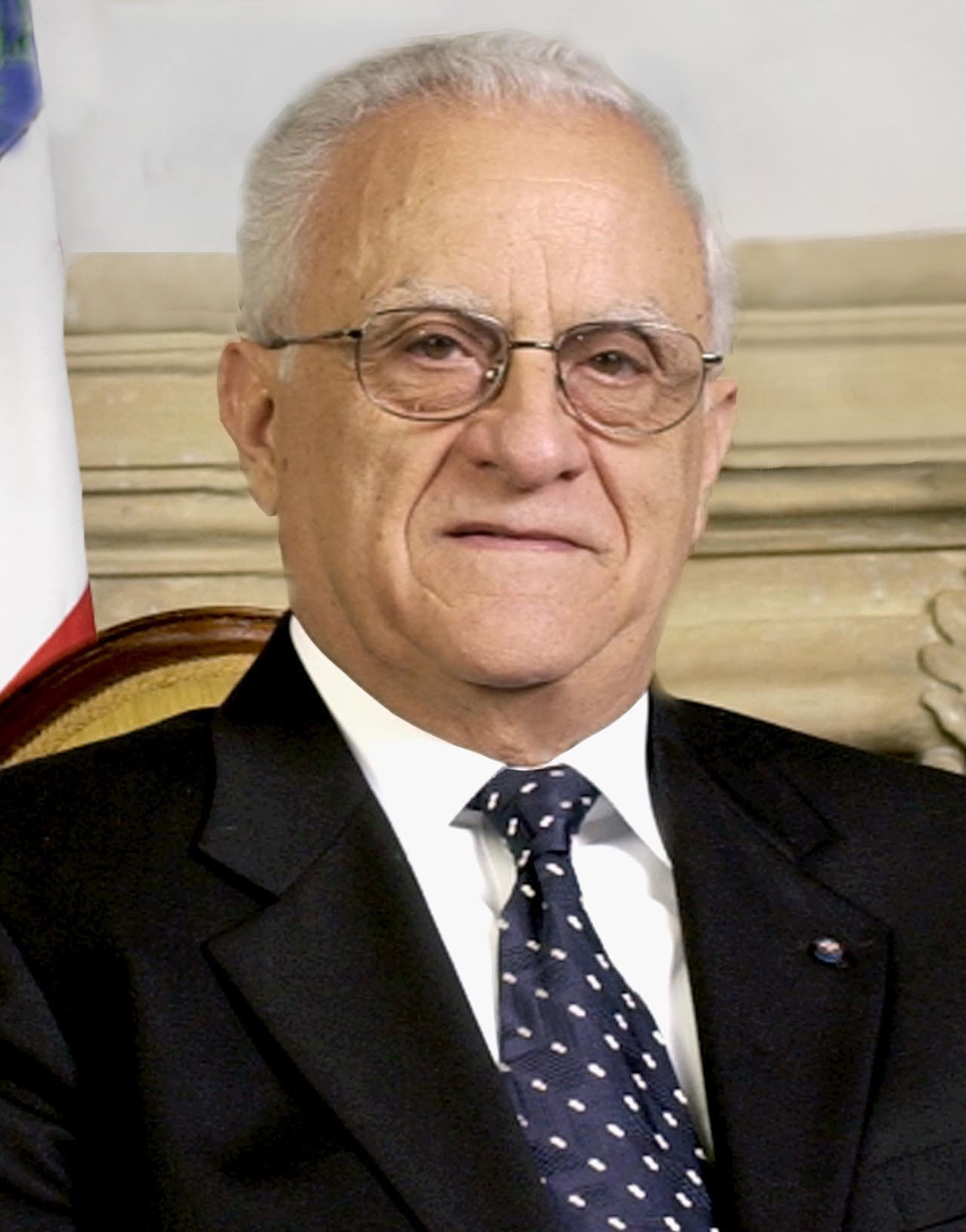

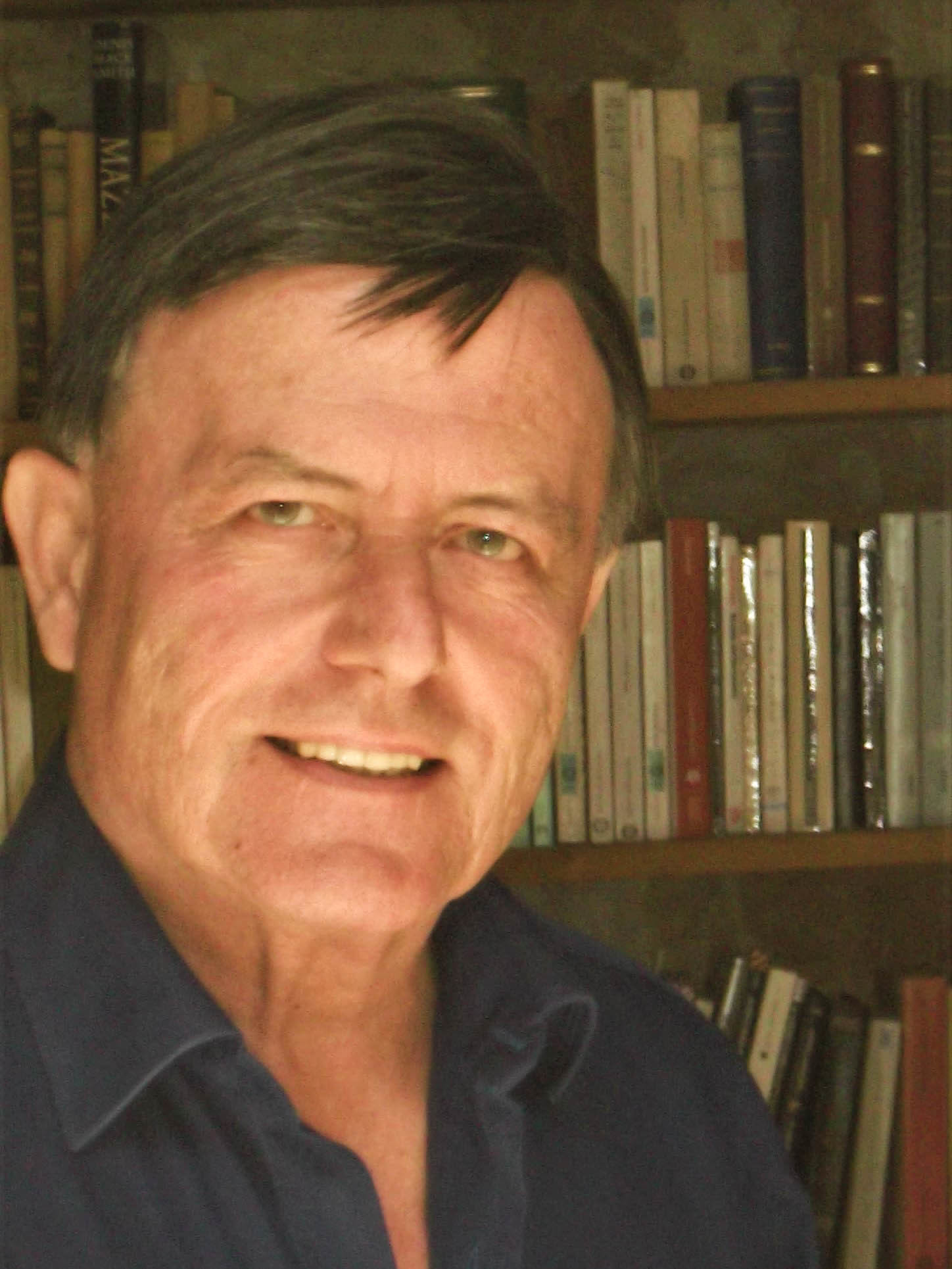
	First party	Second party
Leader	Eddie Fenech Adami	Alfred Sant
Party	Nationalist	Labour
Last election	47.80%, 34 seats	50.72%, 35 seats
Seats won	35	30
Seat change	▲1	▼5
Popular vote	137,037	124,220
Percentage	51.81%	46.97%
Swing	▲4.01pp	▼3.75pp
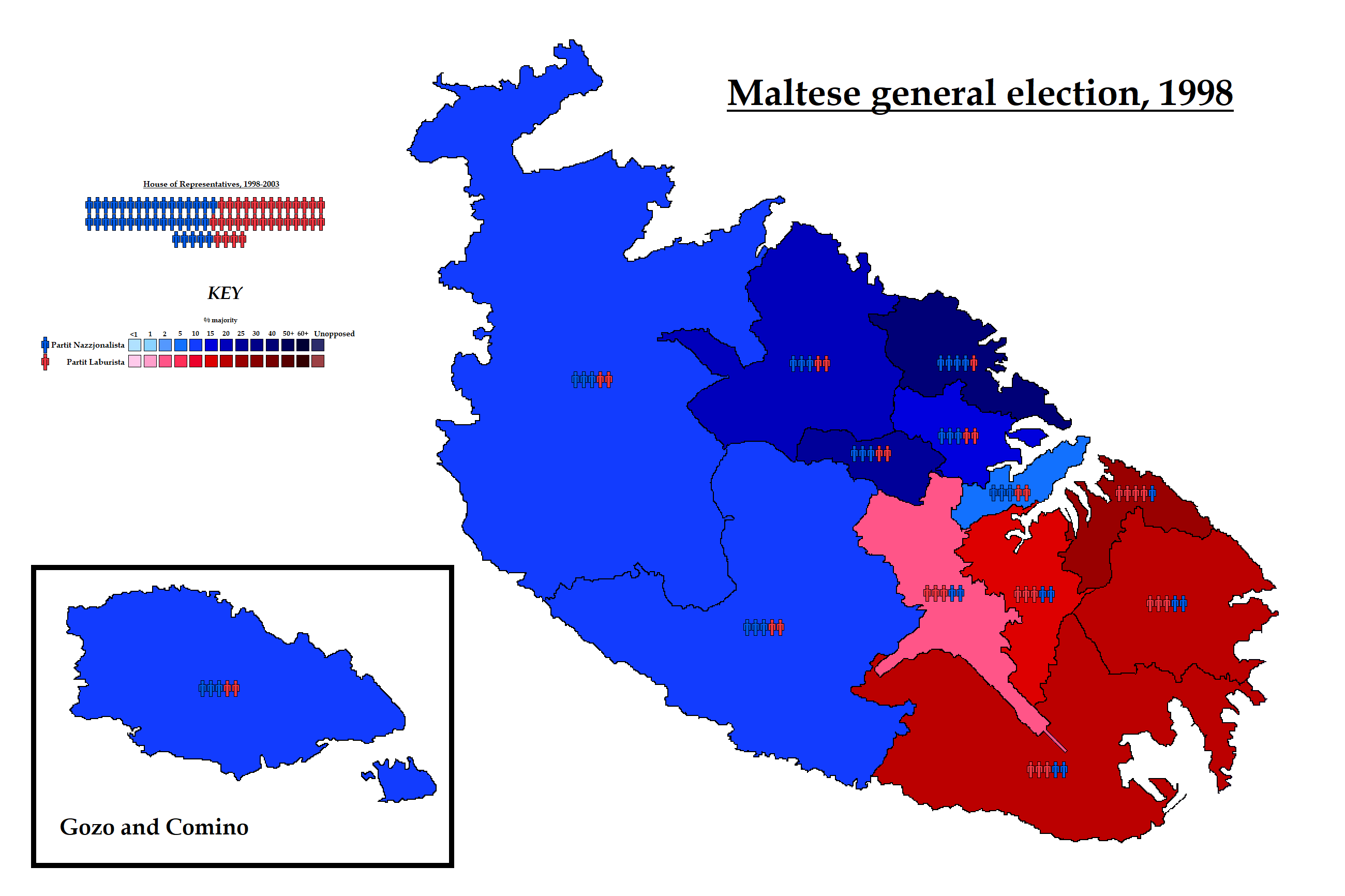
Prime Minister before election
Alfred Sant
Labour
Elected Prime Minister
Eddie Fenech Adami
Nationalist

General elections were held in Malta on 5 September 1998. The result was a victory for the Nationalist Party, which won 35 of the 65 seats.

== Results ==
Party	Votes	%	Seats	+/–
Nationalist Party	137,037	51.81	35	+1
Malta Labour Party	124,220	46.97	30	–5
Democratic Alternative	3,209	1.21	0	0
Independents	27	0.01	0	0
Total	264,493	100.00	65	–4
Valid votes	264,493	98.63		
Invalid/blank votes	3,667	1.37		
Total votes	268,160	100.00		
Registered voters/turnout	281,078	95.40		
Source: Nohlen & Stöver
