= Crown Colony of Malta =

British colony in Europe from 1813 to 1964

Coordinates: 35.8986°N 14.5140°E

Crown Colony of the Island of Malta and its Dependencies Kolonja tal-Gżira ta' Malta u l-Gżejjer li jagħmlu Magħha (Maltese) Colonia dell'Isola di Malta e sue Dipendenze (Italian)
- 1813–1964
- Flag (1943–1964) Colonial badge (1943–1964)
- Anthem: L-Innu Malti (Maltese) "The Maltese Hymn" Royal anthem "God Save the King" (1813–1837; 1901–1952) "God Save the Queen" (1837–1901; 1952–1964)
- Europe in 1815, Malta in dark green, United Kingdom in cyan

- Europe during the Cold War, Malta in dark green, United Kingdom in cyan
- Status: British colony
- Capital: Valletta
- Common languages: English (official); Italian (official until 1934); Maltese (majority; official since 1934)
- Religion: Roman Catholicism
- Demonym: Maltese
- Monarch
  - 1813–1820 (first): George III
  - 1952–1964 (last): Elizabeth II
- Governor
  - 1813–1824 (first): Sir Thomas Maitland
  - 1962–1964 (last): Sir Maurice H. Dorman
- Prime Minister
  - 1921–1923 (first): Joseph Howard
  - 1962–1964 (last): Giorgio Borġ Olivier
- Legislature: Parliament
  - Upper house: Senate (to 1933)
  - Lower house: Legislative Assembly
- History
  - Established: 23 July 1813
  - Treaty of Paris: 30 May 1814
  - Independence: 21 September 1964

Population
  - 1821: 119,000
- Currency: Maltese scudo and various other currencies (1813–1825); Pound sterling (1825–1964)
Preceded by	Succeeded by
Malta Protectorate	State of Malta

The Crown Colony of the Island of Malta and its Dependencies (commonly known as the Crown Colony of Malta or simply Malta) was the British colony in the Maltese islands, that has become the modern Republic of Malta. It was established when the Malta Protectorate was transformed into a British Crown colony in 1813, and this was confirmed by the Treaty of Paris in 1814. The colony gained independence in 1964.

== Establishment and early years (1813–1824) ==
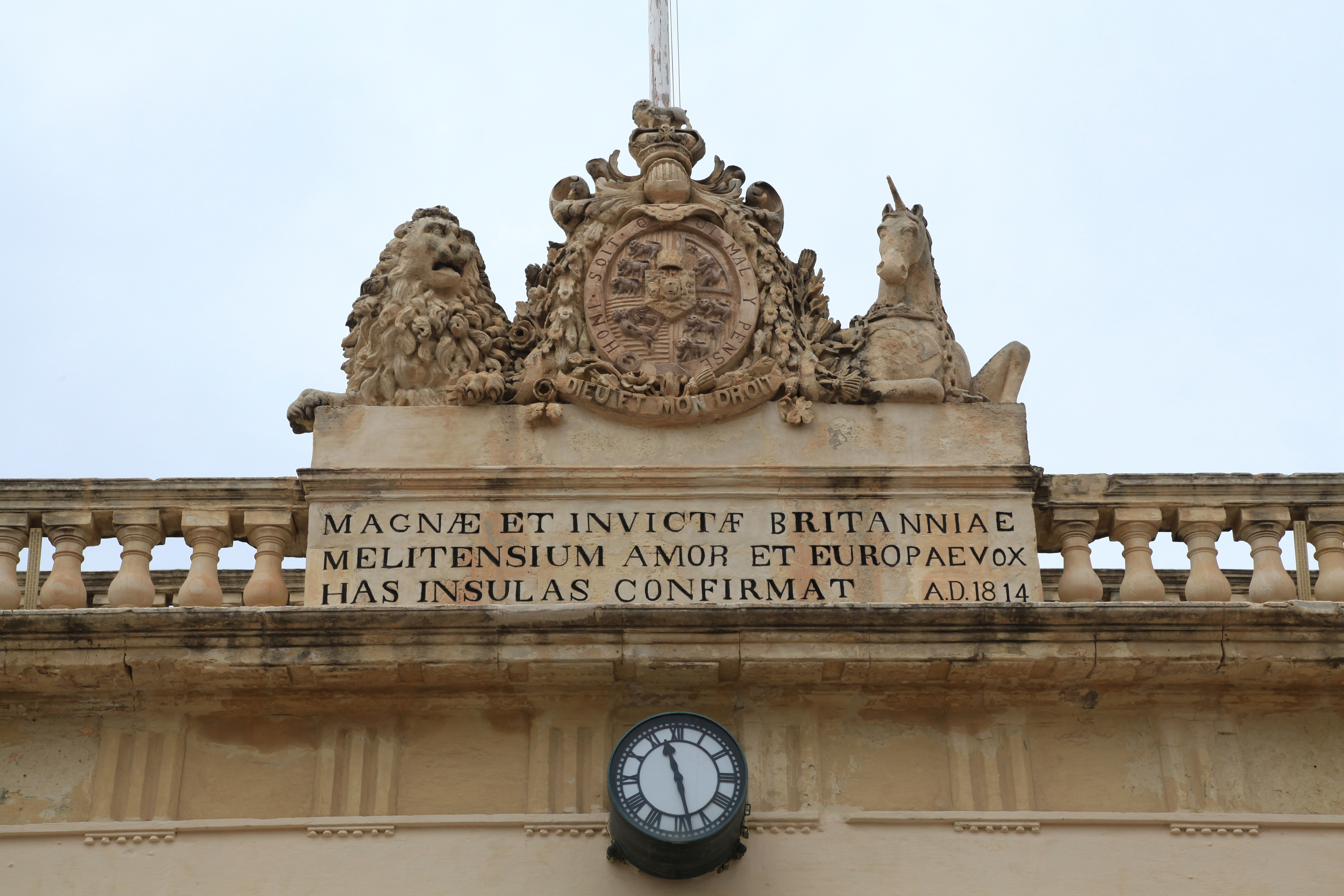
The British coat of arms on the Main Guard building in Valletta. The building now houses the Office of the Attorney General.

From 1530 to 1798, Malta had been ruled by the Order of Saint John. The Order was ousted during the War of the Second Coalition and Malta was occupied by Napoleon. The Maltese rebelled after a couple of months of French rule and asked Britain for help. Eventually, the French capitulated in 1800 and Malta voluntarily became a British protectorate. Britain was then supposed to evacuate the island according to the terms of the Treaty of Amiens of 1802, but failed to keep this obligation – one of several mutual cases of non-adherence to the treaty, which eventually led to its collapse and the resumption of war between Britain and France a year later.

Malta became a Crown Colony on 23 July 1813, when Sir Thomas Maitland was appointed as Governor of Malta. That year, Malta was granted the Bathurst Constitution. Malta's status as a Crown Colony was confirmed by the Treaty of Paris of 1814, which was itself reaffirmed by the Congress of Vienna of 1815.

The plague broke out in Malta in March 1813, when a British merchant ship infected with the disease arrived from Alexandria. The disease began to spread especially in Valletta and the Grand Harbour area, and when Governor Maitland arrived, stricter quarantine measures were enforced. The plague spread to Gozo by January 1814, but the islands were free of the disease by March of that year. Overall, 4,486 people were killed which amounted to 4% of the total population.

After the eradication of the plague, Maitland made several reforms. He was autocratic since he refused to form an advisory council made up of Maltese representatives, and so he was informally known as "King Tom". He formed the Malta Police Force in 1814, while the local Italian-speaking Università was dissolved in 1819. Various reforms were undertaken in taxation and the law courts as well. Maitland remained Governor until his death on 17 January 1824.

== 19th and early 20th centuries (1824–1914) ==
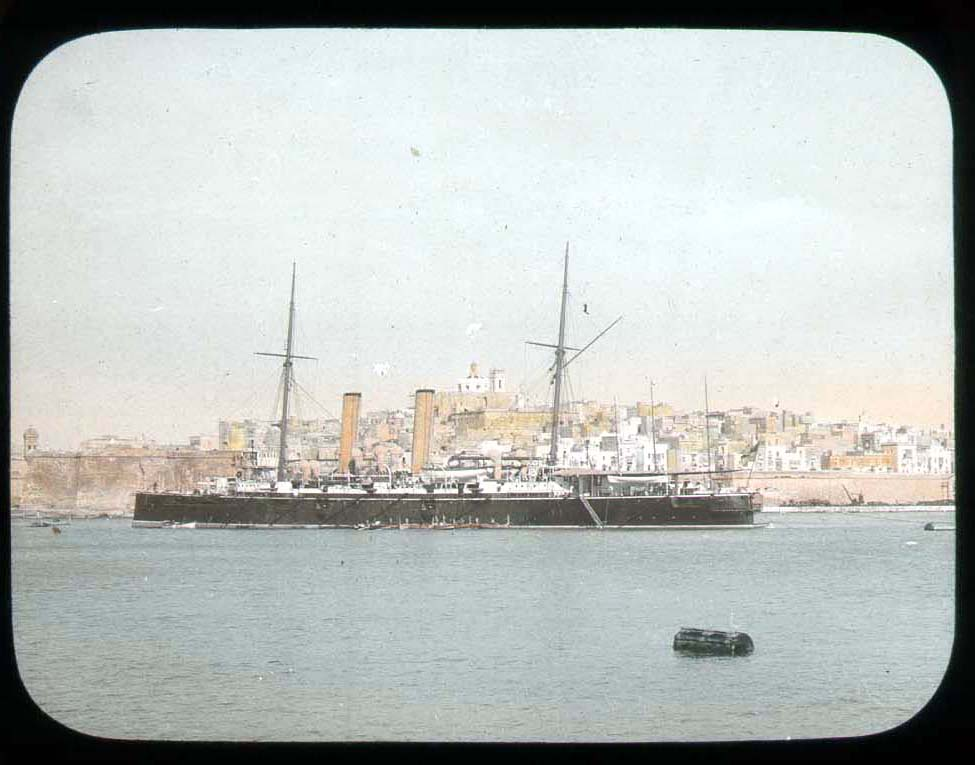
British warship in the Grand Harbour in 1896

In 1825, the Maltese scudo and the other circulating currencies at the time were officially replaced by the pound sterling, with the lowest-valued coin being a one-third farthing coin minted at irregular intervals, the last such issue occurring in 1913, keeping alive the tradition of the Maltese "grano", equal to one-twelfth of a penny. Despite this, scudi and other foreign coinage continued to circulate in limited amounts, and the last scudi were withdrawn over 60 years later in October and November 1886.

During the Greek War of Independence, Malta became an important base for British, French and Russian naval forces, especially after the Battle of Navarino of 1827. The local economy improved and there was a boom in business, but shortly after the war ended in 1832 there was an economic decline.

The year 1828 saw the revocation of the right of sanctuary, following the Vatican Church-State proclamation. Three years later, the See of Malta was made independent of the See of Palermo. In 1839, press censorship was abolished, and the construction of the Anglican St Paul's Pro-Cathedral began.

Following the 1846 Carnival riots, in 1849 a Council of Government with elected members under British rule was set up. In 1870 a referendum was held on ecclesiastics serving on Council of Government, and in 1881 an Executive Council under British rule was created; in 1887, the Council of Government was entrusted with "dual control" under British rule. In 1878 a Royal Commission (the Rowsell-Julyan-Keenan Commission) recommended in its report the Anglicisation of the educational and judicial systems. A backlash came in 1903, with the Return to the 1849 form of Council of Government under British rule.

Despite this, home rule was refused to the Maltese until 1921, and the locals sometimes suffered considerable poverty. This was due to the island being overpopulated and largely dependent on British military expenditure which varied with the demands of war. Throughout the 19th century, the British administration instituted several liberal constitutional reforms which were generally resisted by the Church and the Maltese elite who preferred to cling to their feudal privileges. Political organisations, like the Nationalist Party, were created to protect the Italian language in Malta.

The last quarter of the century saw technical and financial progress in line with the Belle Epoque: the following years saw the foundation of the Anglo-Egyptian Bank (1882) and the beginning of operation of the Malta Railway (1883); the first definitive postage stamps were issued in 1885, and in 1904 tram service begun. In 1886 Surgeon Major David Bruce discovered the microbe causing the Malta Fever, and in 1905 Themistocles Zammit discovered the fever's sources. Finally, in 1912, Dun Karm Psaila wrote his first poem in Maltese.

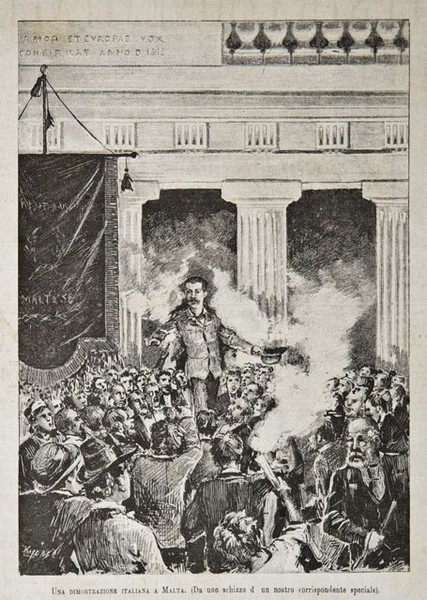
A pro-Italian demonstration in front of the Main Guard, 1883

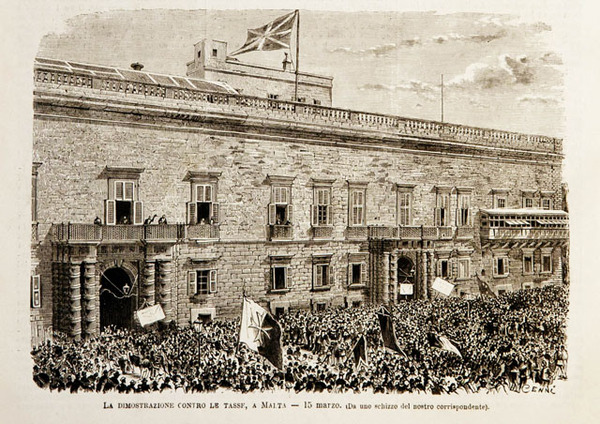
Protests against the bread tax, 1880s

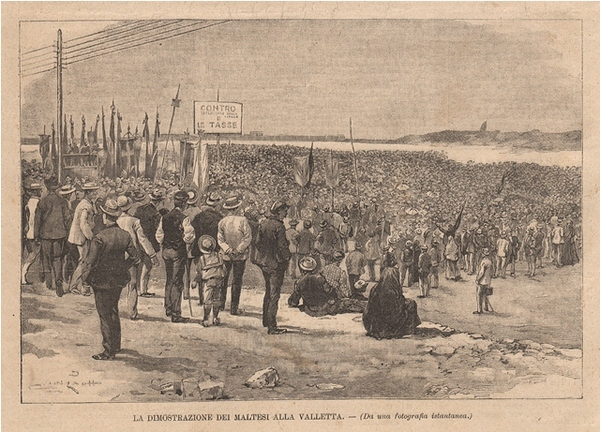
Anti-tax demonstrations in the 1880s

== World War I and the Interwar period (1914–1940) ==
During World War I, Malta became known as the Nurse of the Mediterranean due to the number of wounded soldiers who came to be treated.

In 1919, the Sette Giugno riots over the excessive price of bread led to greater autonomy for the locals during the 1920s. After Filippo Sciberras had convened a National Assembly, in 1921 self-government was granted under British rule. Malta obtained a bicameral parliament with a Senate (later abolished in 1949) and an elected Legislative Assembly. Joseph Howard was named Prime Minister. In 1923 the Innu Malti was played for the first time in public, and the same year Francesco Buhagiar became Prime Minister, followed in 1924 by Sir Ugo Pasquale Mifsud and in 1927 by Sir Gerald Strickland.

The 1930s saw a period of instability in the relations between the Maltese political elite, the Maltese church, and the British rulers; the 1921 Constitution was suspended twice. First in 1930–32, following a clash between the governing Constitutional Party and Church and the latter's subsequent imposition of mortal sin on voters of the party and its allies, thus making a free and fair election impossible. Again, in 1933 the Constitution was withdrawn over the Government's budgetary vote for the teaching of Italian in elementary schools. Malta thus reverted to the Crown Colony status it held in 1813.

Before the arrival of the British, the official language for hundreds of years, and one of the educated elite had been Italian, but this was downgraded by the increased use of English. In 1934, English and Maltese were declared the sole official languages. That year only about 15% of the population could speak Italian fluently. This meant that out of 58,000 males qualified by age to be jurors, only 767 could qualify by language, as only Italian had until then been used in the courts.

In 1936 the Constitution was revised to provide for the nomination of members to Executive Council under British rule, and in 1939 to provide again for an elected Council of Government under British rule.

== World War II and aftermath (1940–1947) ==
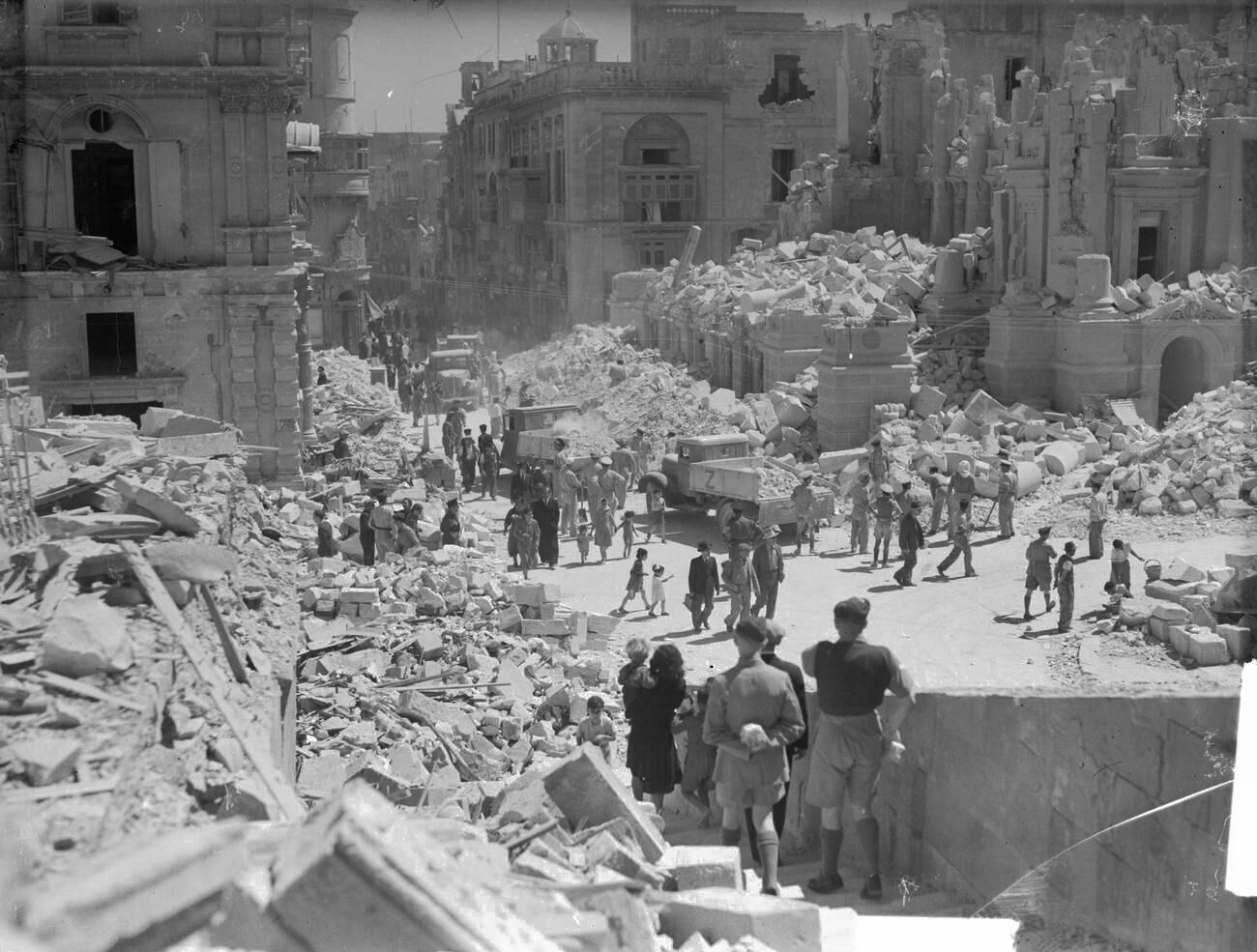
Service personnel and civilians clear up debris on the heavily bombed Strada Reale in Valletta on 1 May 1942

Before World War II, Valletta was the location of the Royal Navy's Mediterranean Fleet's headquarters. However, despite Winston Churchill's objections, the command was moved to Alexandria, Egypt, in April 1937 fearing it was too susceptible to air attacks from Europe. At the time of the Italian declaration of war (10 June 1940), Malta had a garrison of less than four thousand soldiers and about five weeks of food supplies for the population of about three hundred thousand. In addition, Malta's air defences consisted of about forty-two anti-aircraft guns (thirty-four "heavy" and eight "light") and four Gloster Gladiators, for which three pilots were available.

Being a British colony, situated close to Sicily and the Axis shipping lanes, Malta was bombarded by the Italian and German air forces. Malta was used by the British to launch attacks on the Italian navy and had a submarine base. It was also used as a listening post, reading German radio messages including Enigma traffic.

The first air raids against Malta occurred on 11 June 1940; there were six attacks that day. The island's biplanes were unable to defend due to the Luqa Airfield being unfinished; however, the airfield was ready by the seventh attack. Initially, the Italians would fly at about 5,500 m, then they dropped down to three thousand metres (to improve the accuracy of their bombs). Major Paine stated, "[After they dropped down], we bagged one or two every other day, so they started coming in at [six thousand metres]. Their bombing was never very accurate. As they flew higher it became quite indiscriminate." Mabel Strickland would state, "The Italians decided they didn't like [the Gladiators and AA guns], so they dropped their bombs twenty miles off Malta and went back."

By the end of August, the Gladiators were reinforced by twelve Hawker Hurricanes which had arrived via HMS Argus. During the first five months of combat, the island's aircraft destroyed or damaged about thirty-seven Italian aircraft. Italian fighter pilot Francisco Cavalera observed, "Malta was really a big problem for us—very well-defended."

On Malta, 330 people had been killed and 297 were seriously wounded from the war's inception until December 1941. In January 1941, the German X. Fliegerkorps arrived in Sicily as the Afrika Korps arrived in Libya. Over the next four months, 820 people were killed and 915 seriously wounded.

On 15 April 1942, King George VI awarded the George Cross (the highest civilian award for gallantry) "to the island fortress of Malta – its people and defenders". Franklin D. Roosevelt arrived on 8 December 1943, and presented a United States Presidential Citation to the people of Malta on behalf of the people of the United States. He presented the scroll on 8 December but dated it 7 December for symbolic reasons. In part, it read: "Under repeated fire from the skies, Malta stood alone and unafraid in the center of the sea, one tiny bright flame in the darkness – a beacon of hope for the clearer days which have come." The complete citation now stands on a plaque on the wall of the Grand Master's Palace on Republic Street in the town square of Valletta.

In 1942, the Operation Pedestal convoy arrived in Grand Harbour, and the following year Franklin D. Roosevelt and Winston Churchill visited Malta. King George VI also arrived in Grand Harbour for a visit.

During the Second World War, Ugo Pasquale Mifsud and George Borg Olivier were the only remaining Nationalist members of parliament of Malta. Ugo Mifsud fainted after delivering a very passionate defence against the deportation to concentration camps in Uganda of Enrico Mizzi and 49 other Maltese Italians accused of pro-Italian political activities. He died a few days later.

The Allies launched their invasion of Sicily from Malta in 1943. After the Cassibile armistice in the same year, the Italian Fleet surrendered to the Allies in Malta. In 1945, Churchill and Roosevelt met in Malta prior to the Yalta Conference with Joseph Stalin.

The 1946 National Assembly resulted in the 1947 constitution, with the restoration of self-government, and Paul Boffa became the fifth Prime Minister of Malta.

== Home rule to Independence (1947–1964) ==
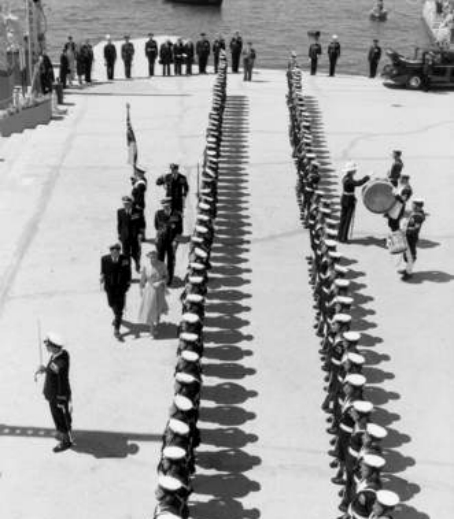
Queen Elizabeth II visiting RAF Hal Far in 1954

After the Second World War, the islands achieved self-government, with the Malta Labour Party (MLP) of Dom Mintoff seeking either full integration with the UK or else self-determination (independence), and the Partit Nazzjonalista (PN) of Giorgio Borġ Olivier favouring independence, with the same "dominion status" that Canada, Australia and New Zealand enjoyed. Meanwhile, after the 1948 Red Flag Incident, in 1949 Britain signed the North Atlantic Treaty and joined NATO.

After the 1952 accession of Queen Elizabeth II, in December 1955 a Round Table Conference was held in London, on the future of Malta, attended by the new PM Dom Mintoff, Borġ Olivier and other Maltese politicians, along with the British Colonial Secretary, Alan Lennox-Boyd. The British government agreed to offer the islands three seats of their own in the British House of Commons. In addition, the Home Office would take over responsibility for Maltese affairs from the Colonial Office. Under the proposals, the Maltese Parliament would also retain responsibility over all affairs except defence, foreign policy, and taxation. The Maltese were also to have social and economic parity with the UK, to be guaranteed by the British Ministry of Defence (MoD), the islands' main source of employment.

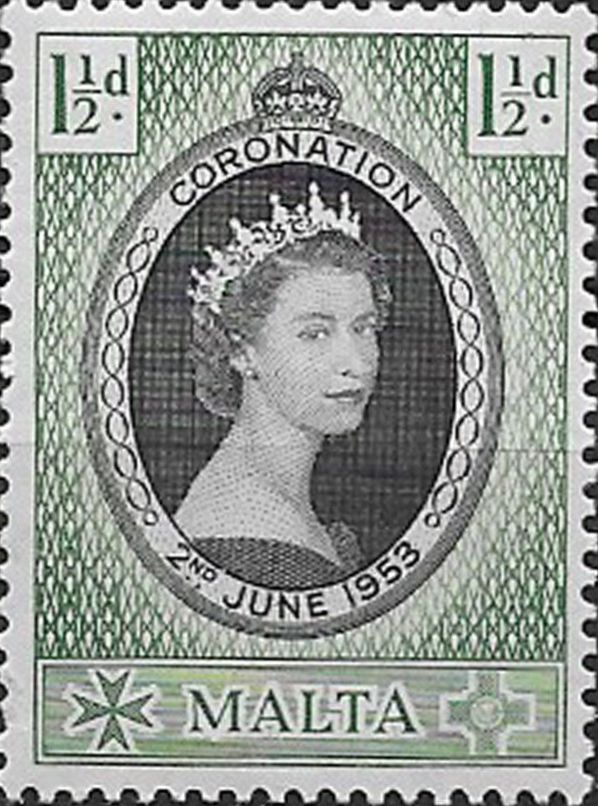
A 1953 Malta stamp with a portrait of Queen Elizabeth II

A UK integration referendum was held on 11 and 12 February 1956, in which 77.02 per cent of voters were in favour of the proposal, but owing to a boycott by the Nationalist Party, only 59.1 per cent of the electorate voted, allowing the opposition to claim that the result was inconclusive.

There were also concerns expressed by British MPs that the representation of Malta at Westminster would set a precedent for other colonies, and influence the outcome of general elections.

In addition, the decreasing strategic importance of Malta to the Royal Navy meant that the British government was increasingly reluctant to maintain the naval dockyards. Following a decision by the Admiralty to dismiss 40 workers at the dockyard, Mintoff declared that "representatives of the Maltese people in Parliament declare that they are no longer bound by agreements and obligations toward the British government" (the 1958 Caravaggio incident) In response, the Colonial Secretary sent a cable to Mintoff, stating that he had "recklessly hazarded" the whole integration plan.

Under protest, Mintoff resigned as Prime Minister, while Borġ Olivier declined to form an alternative government. This led to the islands being placed under direct colonial administration from London for the second time, with the MLP abandoning support for integration and now advocating independence. In 1959, an Interim Constitution provided for an Executive Council under British rule.

While France had implemented a similar policy in its colonies, some of which became overseas departments, the status offered to Malta from Britain constituted a unique exception. Malta was the only British colony where integration with the UK was seriously considered, and subsequent British governments have ruled out integration for remaining overseas territories, such as Gibraltar.

In 1961, the Blood Commission provided for a new constitution allowing for a measure of self-government. Giorgio Borġ Olivier became Prime Minister the following year when the Stolper report was delivered. Malta became independent on 21 September 1964.

Flag of Malta in the 19th century

Flag (1875–1898)

Flag (1898–1923)

Flag (1923–1943)

Flag (1943–1964)
Unofficial flag prior to 1943

Unofficial flag (1943–1964)
