= 1939 Maltese general election =

- 22–24 July 1939
- 10 seats in the Parliament of Malta; 6 seats needed for a majority
| Party | Leader | Vote % | Seats | +/– |
|---|---|---|---|---|
| Constitutional | Gerald Strickland | 54.51 | 6 | −4 |
| Nationalist | Ugo Pasquale Mifsud | 33.06 | 3 | −18 |
| Labour | Paul Boffa | 8.82 | 1 | 0 |
This lists parties that won seats. See the complete results below.
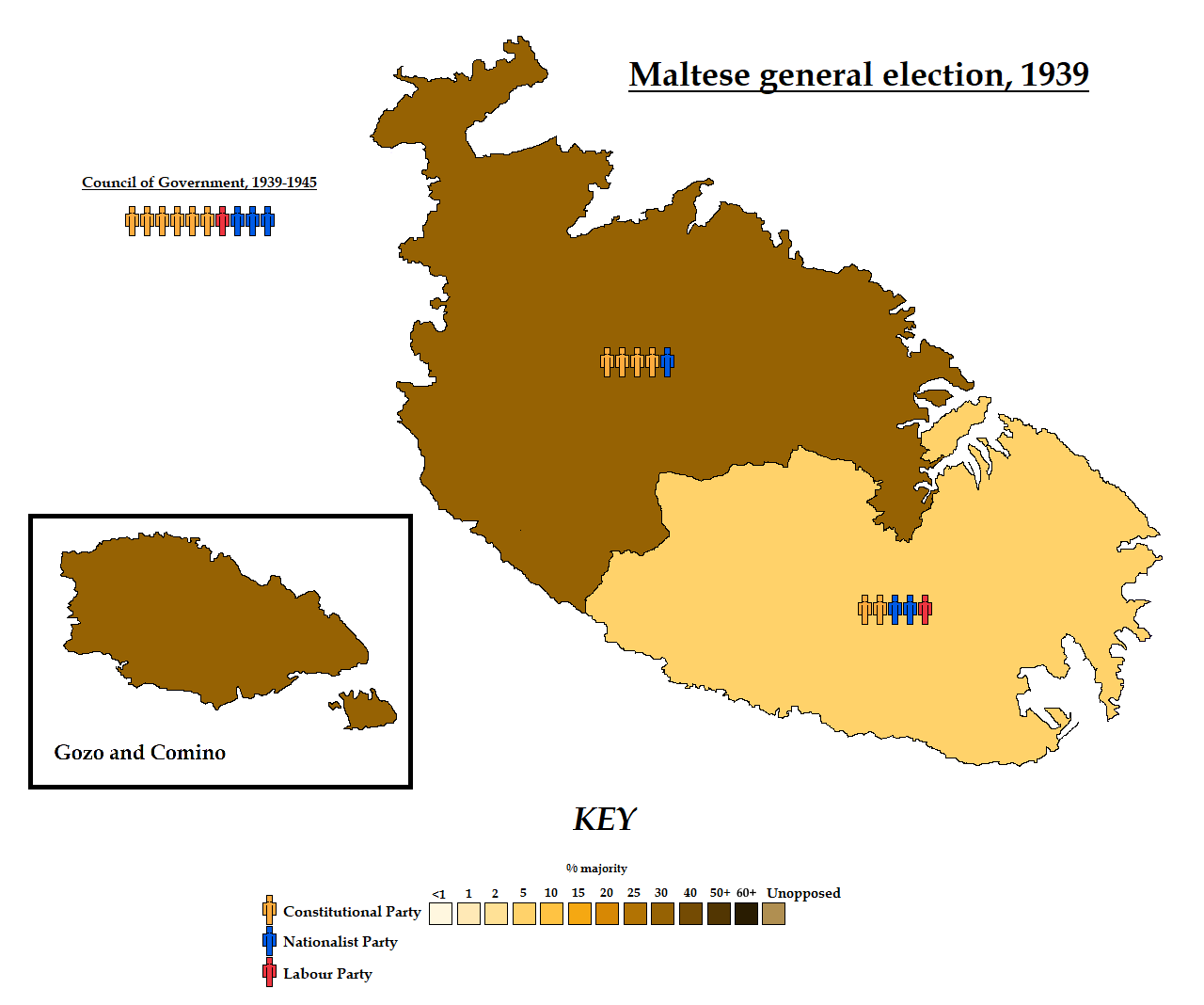

General elections were held in Malta between 22 and 24 July 1939. The Constitutional Party emerged as the largest party, winning six of the ten seats.

== Electoral system ==
The elections were held using the single transferable vote system, whilst suffrage was limited to men meeting certain property qualifications. The number of seats was reduced from 32 to 10.

== Results ==
| Party | Votes | % | Seats | +/– |
|---|---|---|---|---|
| Constitutional Party | 19,156 | 54.51 | 6 | –4 |
| Nationalist Party | 11,618 | 33.06 | 3 | –18 |
| Labour Party | 3,100 | 8.82 | 1 | 0 |
| Independents | 1,265 | 3.60 | 0 | 0 |
| Total | 35,139 | 100.00 | 10 | –22 |
| Valid votes | 35,139 | 98.96 | | |
| Invalid/blank votes | 371 | 1.04 | | |
| Total votes | 35,510 | 100.00 | | |
| Registered voters/turnout | 47,306 | 75.06 | | |
Source: Nohlen & Stöver
