= Augusto Bartolo =

Maltese journalist, politician and judge

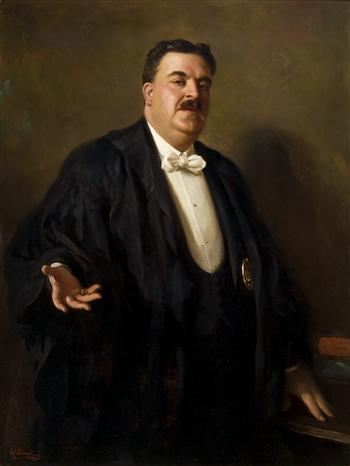
Portrait by Edward Caruana Dingli

Judge Sir Augusto Bartolo

Sir Augusto Bartolo (1883 – 20 February 1937), sometimes known as Augustus Bartolo, was a Maltese journalist, politician and judge.

== Biography ==
He took an active role in the process of the Maltese constitutional and political development. Being pro-British Bartolo was against the Italian irredentist claim over Malta. However, in his political life he opposed the Anglicisation of Maltese culture, performed back then by the Prime Minister of Malta, Sir Gerald Strickland. Augusto Bartolo and Gerald Strickland were both founders of the Constitutional Party. The political party supported the English language during the language question in Malta with Bartolo having showed equal support to both English and Italian, and Strickland English and Maltese. Bartolo took a prominent role in the early governance of Malta working to bring social reforms.

Bartolo studied law becoming a lawyer, and later a prominent judge in Malta. He was an editor of the Malta Chronicle. During his political life he was a senator (when Malta still had a senate) and later became the Minister for Public Instruction and Migration in Malta, serving a crucial role when significant percentage of the Maltese population emigrated to British colonies of the time. One of his residences was the notable Villa Guardamangia which was later the temporal official residence of some members of the British royal family when residing in Malta.

He is buried at the cemetery of Santa Maria Addolorata ("Our Lady of Sorrows") in Paola, the largest graveyard of the country. A street in Ta' Xbiex is named after him as Sir Augustus Bartolo Street.
