= Paul Boffa =

Maltese politician (1890–1962)

Sir Paul (Pawlu) Boffa
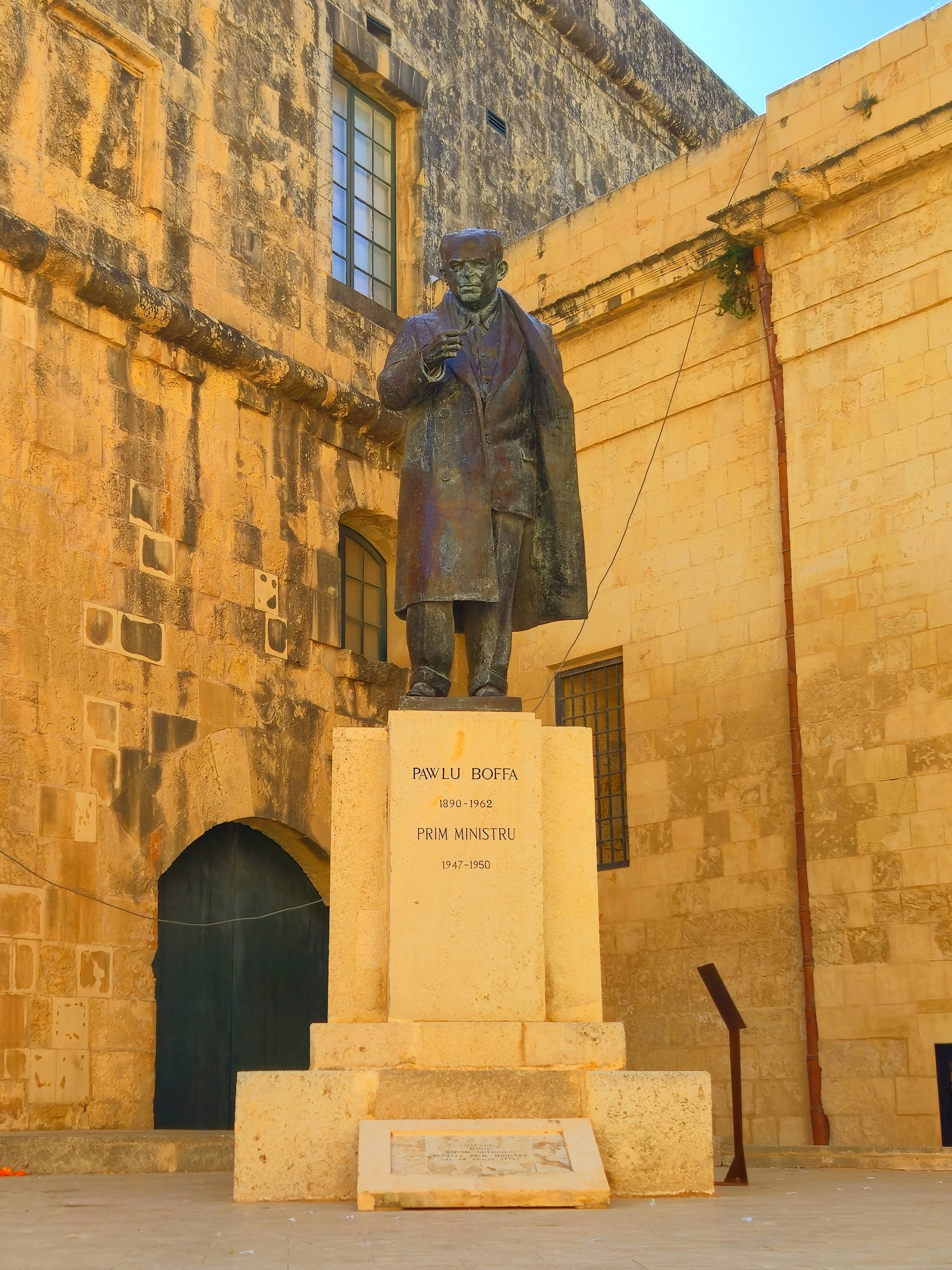
- Statue of Sir Paul Boffa in Castille Square, Valletta, 2026

5th Prime Minister of Malta
- In office 4 November 1947 – 26 September 1950
- Monarch: George VI
- Governor: Sir Francis Douglas; Sir Gerald Creasy
- Preceded by: Position re-established
- Succeeded by: Enrico Mizzi

3rd Leader of the Malta Labour Party
- In office 29 November 1928 – 16 October 1949
- Preceded by: Michael Dundon
- Succeeded by: Dom Mintoff

Personal details
- Born: 30 June 1890 Birgu, Malta
- Died: 6 July 1962 (aged 72) Paola, Malta
- Party: Labour Party
- Other political affiliations: Malta Workers Party (1949-1955)
- Spouse: Genoveffa Cecy
- Children: 4
- Education: University of Malta
- Profession: Politician; medical doctor

Sir Paul Boffa, OBE (30 June 1890 – 6 July 1962), was a Maltese politician and medical doctor who served as prime minister in the Colony of Malta after self-rule was reinstated by the British colonial authorities, following the end of the Second World War. He was created a Knight Bachelor by Queen Elizabeth II in 1956.

== Life ==
Born in Vittoriosa on 30 June 1890, Paul Boffa was educated at the Lyceum and at the University of Malta from where he graduated as a medical doctor in 1912. During World War I, he served with the Royal Army Medical Corps in Malta, Salonika and on hospital ships. After the war he set up in private practice in Paola.

In 1921, he married Genoveffa Cecy and had two sons and two daughters: Salvino (a.k.a. Vivi), Hilda, Joseph (a.k.a. Profs), Carmelina (a.k.a. Melina). He died at his home in Paola and is buried at the All Souls Cemetery in Tarxien.

=== King George V (KGV) Memorial Hospital ===
In 1976, the King George V (KGV) Memorial Hospital, a memorial to the seamen of the Merchant Navy who had died in WWl, was renamed the Sir Paul Boffa Hospital.

The hospital, opened in 1922 as a memorial to the men of the British Merchant Navy who'd died in World War I, damaged severely by aerial bombing 1942, was rebuilt in 1948 under the premiership of Paul Boffa, in 1976 renamed Sir Paul Boffa Hospital. It served as Malta's main oncology hospital until the opening of the Sir Anthony Mamo Oncology Centre. Some wards were used to treat infectious diseases. Later, those services were transferred to Mater Dei Hospital. Its last major use was for COVID-19 patients. In May 2025, it was announced that the hospital would be renamed the Floriana Health Centre.

== Politics ==
Paul Boffa entered politics when Malta was granted self-government in 1921 and joined the Labour Party in 1923. He was returned to Legislative Assembly under the Amery-Milner Constitution in 1924, 1927 and 1932 and elected Leader of the Labour Party in 1927. The Labour and the Constitutional Parties formed an electoral agreement (known as the "Compact") for the 1927 elections. Thanks to this the Constitutional Party was able to form a government with the support of Labour although this was not a coalition in the true sense of the word as Labour refused to assume any ministerial portfolios. In 1932 Boffa was the only Labour Party candidate elected to the Legislative Assembly until it was dissolved in 1933. He was nominated as a member of the Executive Council from 1936 to 1939 and was elected, again as the sole Labour representative, to the Council of Government in 1939.

During the World War II, Boffa served with distinction as district Commissioner and ARP Medical Officer in the Cottonera, Paola, Tarxien and Luqa areas. He was awarded the OBE in 1941.

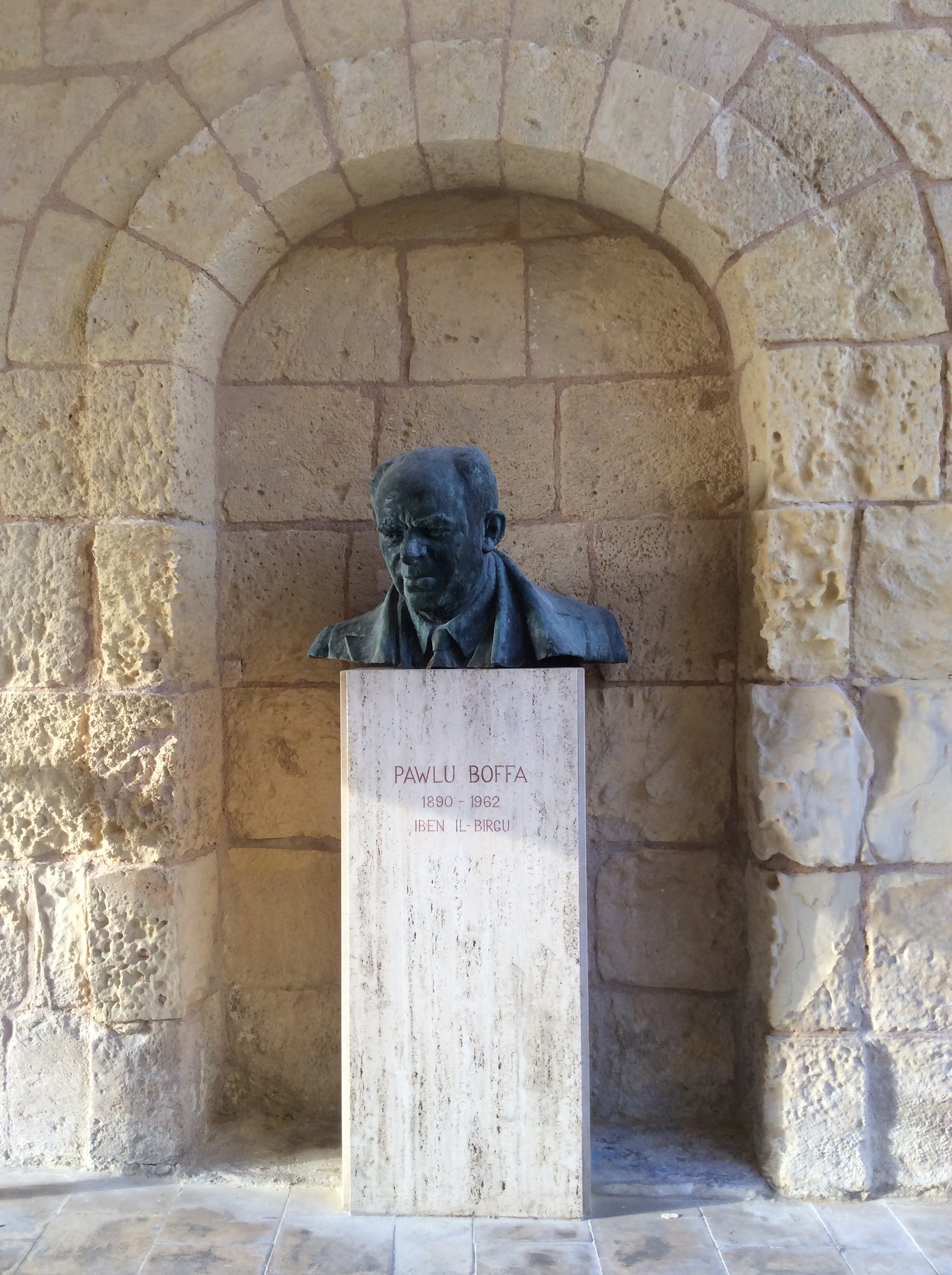
Pawlu Boffa Monument at Birgu entrance

In the 1945 elections, Boffa was again elected in the Labour Party's interests. He reached the peak of his political career in November 1947, when he became the first Labour Prime Minister leading a majority government of 24 Labour members. In 1949, following the Labour Party's ultimatum to Britain concerning financial help, the Labour Party split up; but Boffa continued as prime minister. He later founded and led the Malta Workers' Party (MWP). The MWP lost the 1950 Elections.

Boffa was re-elected to the legislature in 1951 and again in 1953. Though he never again held the Prime Minister's office, he joined a coalition government with the Nationalist Party led by Giorgio Borġ Olivier. In this cabinet, Boffa assumed the portfolio of Health and Social Services. The MWP did not contest the 1955 elections and in that year, he resigned from parliament for health reasons. He nonetheless retained an interest in politics, and was nominated Honorary President of the Christian Workers' Party (CWP).

Boffa was created a Knight Bachelor in the 1956 New Year's Honours List in recognition of distinguished public services. He was also awarded the 1914-18 Star, the General Service Medal, the Victory Medal, the Coronation Medal and the Defence Medal.

Boffa was instrumental in obtaining recognition of the Maltese language in the law courts and the introduction of compulsory primary education and old-age pensions as well as the granting of the vote to women.

== See also ==
- Prime Minister of Malta
- List of prime ministers of Malta

Party political offices
Preceded by Michael Dundon	Leader of the Malta Labour Party; 1947–1950	Succeeded by Dom Mintoff
Political offices
Preceded by office abolished (1933-1947)	Prime Minister of Malta; 1947–1950	Succeeded by Enrico Mizzi
