= Governor Strickland =

Governor Strickland may refer to:

- Gerald Strickland, 1st Baron Strickland (1861–1940), Governor of the Leeward Islands, of Tasmania, of Western Australia, and of New South Wales for various periods between 1902 and 1917
- Ted Strickland (born 1941), 68th Governor of Ohio from 2007 to 2011
