= Constitutional Party (Malta) =

Constitutional Party Partit Kostituzzjonali
- Leader: Gerald Strickland
- Founded: 2 September 1921
- Dissolved: 1946 (original); 1953
- Merger of: Anglo-Maltese Party; Maltese Constitutional Party
- Succeeded by: Progressive Constitutional Party
- Ideology: Monarchism; Progressive conservatism Maltese integration with Britain

Party flag

The Constitutional Party (Maltese: Partit Kostituzzjonali) was a pro-British political party in Malta. It had representatives in the Maltese Legislative Assembly and Council of Government between 1921 and 1945, and again between 1950 and 1953, forming a government between 1927 and 1930 with the support of the Labour Party. A splinter group, the Progressive Constitutionalist Party was represented in Parliament between 1962 and 1966. The party was very much centred on the figure (and wealth) of its long-time leader Lord Strickland, with party supporters colloquially known in Maltese as "Stricklandjani".

== History ==
=== Foundation ===
The party was formed in 1921, in time for the first elections to the Legislative Assembly. It was a merger of Strickland's Anglo-Maltese Party and the Maltese Constitutional Party of Augusto Bartolo, editor of the Malta Chronicle. The predecessor parties had only recently been founded and the choice to merge was strategic: they were both pro-British and, united, they stood a better chance against the Nationalists.

Despite this, the merger still came as a surprise as there were some personality difference. Strickland had been Principal Government Secretary who had become unpopular for raising taxes through Orders in Council, something of which Bartolo was highly critical. It was rumoured that Strickland threatened Bartolo that he would use his personal wealth to create a paper that would kill off the Chronicle if the merger did not come about. Strickland was to make the threat true years later with the creation of Progress Press and the publication of the dailies Il-Berqa (in Maltese) and the Times of Malta which did, eventually, kill off the Chronicle.

=== Early years ===
The party did surprisingly well in the first elections, considering that everyone thought that Strickland's previous unpopularity would harm his chances. In the elections to the Legislative Assembly it obtained 25.31% of the first preference votes, and won 7 of the 32 seats. Strickland was appointed Leader of the Opposition.

While still remaining in opposition, the party made considerable gains in the 1924 elections, winning 33.95% of the vote and 10 seats, emerging as the joint-largest party with the Maltese Political Union which, until then, had been the largest party in the Assembly. The party also won two of the four seats in Gozo, which was considered an incredible feat.

With the coalition between the Maltese Political Union and the Democratic Nationalist Party and their eventual merger into the Nationalist Party, some sort of rapprochement between the Constitutionals and Labour, the other party in the Assembly, was inevitable. The parties agreed to an electoral alliance known as the "Compact" for the 1927 elections. Labour's and the Constitutional's similar stances on various policy-areas (such as public education) made this alliance more workable.

=== In government ===
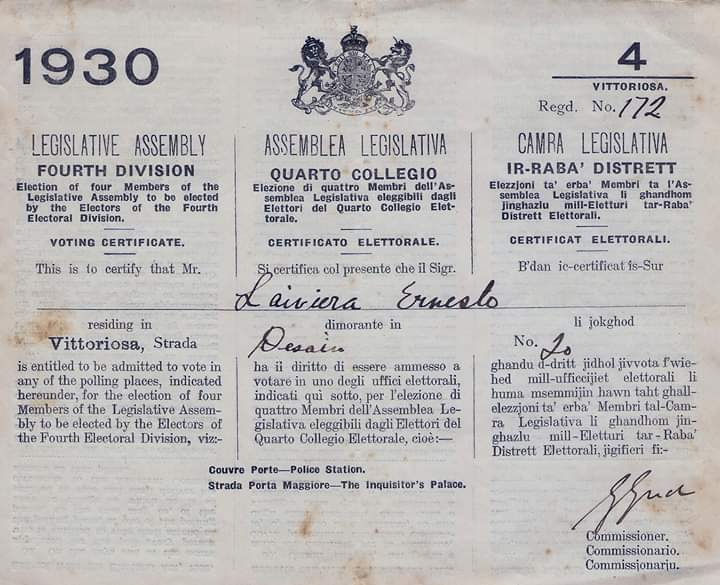
Voting document for the cancelled 1930 elections in Malta

The party obtained a relative majority of 15 seats out of 32 in the 1927 elections. Labour was invited to participate in a coalition. The offer was declined but, in terms of the "Compact" agreement, the three Labour MPs supported the government giving it a majority. The government, however, lacked a majority in the Senate which, at the time, could still reject money bills. After a protracted battle, letters patent were issued, amending the Constitution, so that bills could be carried by a simple majority of both Houses combined.

The other major battle of this government was with the Church. There had been a long buildup to the crisis. The Church was perceived as being sympathetic to the Nationalist Party and the Progress Press papers lost no opportunity in condemning the behaviour of priests particularly in Gozo.

A trivial incident led to things boiling over. The government decided to intervene when a superior at the Franciscan convent in Valletta (who happened to be an Italian by the name of Padre Carta) decided to send to Italy Rev. Micallef, a Maltese priest under his responsibility. Strickland's papers alleged that this amounted to exile of a Maltese and was due to Micallef's pro-Strickland sympathies.

In the feast of Christ the King of 1930 the Bishop's sermon (in Italian) was interrupted by Labour and Constitutional supporters who clamoured for Maltese. This was a signal and outside St John's Co-Cathedral pro- and anti-Church crowds verbally confronted each other. Tensions rose as the different factions shouted "Viva Calles!" and "Viva Kristu Re!" in reference to the contemporary anti-clerical policies of Plutarco Calles and the resistance put up by the Cristeros in Mexico.

On 1 May 1930, as the elections approached, Bishops Dom Mauro Caruana and Mikiel Gonzi issued a pastoral letter imposing mortal sin and an interdict on voters of the Constitutional Party and its allies (taken to refer to Labour). This gave the pretext to the colonial authorities to claim that a free and fair election was not possible in the circumstances and, therefore, to suspend the constitution. Strickland and his ministers were held on as a caretaker government.

=== In opposition ===
The suspension of the Constitution was to last three years. During this time a royal commission visited Malta and interviewed the parties concerned. In its final report the commission sharply rebuked Strickland, and recommended some changes to ameliorate Church-State relations.

The scene was set for elections in 1932. Technically, the prohibition for Catholics to vote Constitutional and Labour was still in place. Only on the eve of the election did Strickland ask for forgiveness and, although this was granted and the interdict lifted, it was too late to have much impact on the electoral result. The Constitutional Party gained 10 seats out of 32 (down from 15); its ally, the Labour Party, managed to elect only its leader Paul Boffa. Strickland was sworn in as Leader of the Opposition.

The Nationalists' stint in government was to be short lived. The following year, the constitution was again suspended when the government in its financial estimates increased funding for the teaching of Italian. With Mussolini's growing ambitions in the Mediterranean the Colonial authorities saw this as a threat on the domestic front and dismissed the government. Strickland argued that, as leader of the second largest party in the Assembly, he was supposed to be summoned and requested to try to form a government. The matter was the subject of a lengthy legal case which went all the way to the Privy Council. Strickland's plea was not upheld.

=== Council of Government ===
A constitution was given in 1936 which created a Council of Government, of which less than half were elected representatives. The first election under this constitution was held in 1939. With a strong anti-Italian and pro-British sentiment prevailing, the Constitutional Party elected six councillors to the Nationalists' three and Labour's one.

Strickland died in 1940 to be succeeded as party leader by Robert Galea.

=== Post-war ===
The Constitutional Party did not contest the 1945 elections, and the following year it was dissolved.

In 1950 it was resurrected by Galea and Mabel Strickland. In the 1950 elections it ran on a platform opposing tax rises and accusing Labour of being infiltrated by Communists. It won four seats, which it retained in the elections the following year. However, Mabel Strickland had to resign after her the publishing company won a major government contract. Strickland was also at odds with the other party MPs who, in the emerging two-party system, tended to side with Labour leader Mintoff.

Mabel Strickland went on to form the splinter Progressive Constitutionalist Party but neither party gained seats in the general election of 1953. After this defeat the Constitutional Party was dissolved.

== Electoral results ==
Election	Leader	Votes	%	Seats	+/–	Position	Government
1921	Gerald Strickland	5,183	25.3	7 / 32	▲7	▲2nd	Opposition
1924	Gerald Strickland	8,172	34.0	10 / 32	▲3	▲1st	Opposition
1927	Gerald Strickland	14,290	41.5	15 / 32	▲5	1st	Coalition
1932	Gerald Strickland	15,023	31.1	10 / 32	▼5	▼2nd	Opposition
1939	Gerald Strickland	19,156	54.4	6 / 10	▼4	▲1st	Majority
Did not contest the 1945 and 1947 elections.
1950	Robert Galea	10,584	10.0	4 / 40	▼2	▼4th	Opposition
1951	Robert Galea	9,150	8.1	4 / 40	Steady	4th	Opposition
1953	Robert Galea	1,374	1.2	0 / 40	▼4	▼5th	Extra Parliamentary

== Leaders ==
- 1921-40 Gerald Strickland
- 1940-53 Robert Galea
