= Interdict =

Type of ban within Catholic canon law

In Catholic canon law, an interdict (/ˈɪntərdɪkt/) is an ecclesiastical censure, or ban that prohibits certain persons or groups from participating in particular rites, or that the rites and services of the church are prohibited in certain territories for a limited or extended time.

== Definition ==
An interdict is a censure, or prohibition, excluding the faithful from participation in certain holy things, such as the Liturgy, the sacraments (excepting private administrations of those that are of necessity), and ecclesiastical burial, including all funeral services.

The prohibition varies in degree, according to the different kinds of interdicts. Interdicts are either local or personal. The former affect territories or sacred buildings; the latter directly affect persons. A general local interdict is one affecting a whole territory, district, town, etc., and this was the ordinary interdict of the Middle Ages; a particular local interdict is one affecting, for example, a particular church. A general personal interdict is one falling on a given body or group of people as a class, e.g. on a chapter, the clergy or people of a town, or a community; a particular personal interdict is one affecting certain individuals as such, for instance, a given bishop, a given cleric.

Interdict differs from excommunication, in that it does not cut one off from the communion of the faithful. It differs from suspension also in that the latter affects the faculties of clerics, while the interdict affects the access of the faithful to religious rites. While the clergy cannot exercise their functions towards those under interdict, or in interdicted places or buildings, their powers are not directly affected, as happens in case of suspension.

== 1917 Code of Canon Law ==
=== Distinctions ===
Only the Holy See was empowered to impose a general interdict on a diocese or State or a personal interdict on the people of a diocese or country, but bishops too could impose a general interdict on a parish or on the people of a parish or a particular interdict on a place (such as a church or oratory, an altar or a cemetery) or a person.

=== Effects ===
A local interdict forbade general public celebration of sacred rites. Exceptions were made for the dying, and local interdicts were almost entirely suspended on five feasts of the year: Christmas Day, Easter Sunday, Pentecost, Corpus Christi and the Assumption of Mary.

Those who were under personal interdict were forbidden to be at any religious rite except preaching of the word of God. While mere attendance by them did not require that they be expelled, those well known to be under interdict were to be prevented from taking any active part.

== 1983 Code of Canon Law ==
An interdict today has the effect of forbidding the person concerned to celebrate or receive any of the sacraments, including the Eucharist, or to celebrate the sacramentals. One who is under interdict is also forbidden to take any ministerial part (e.g., as a reader if a layperson or as a deacon or priest if a clergyman) in the celebration of the Eucharist or of any other ceremony of public worship.

These are the only effects for those who have incurred a latae sententiae interdict, namely, one incurred automatically at the moment of committing the offence for which canon law imposes that penalty. For instance, a priest may not deny Holy Communion publicly to those who are under merely automatic interdict, even if he knows they have incurred this kind of penalty – unless the reason for the interdict is known publicly and is persistent, in which case (though not technically due to the interdict) the concerned people are to be denied Holy Communion by force of can. 915.

However, in the case of a ferendae sententiae interdict, one incurred only when imposed by a legitimate superior or by sentence of an ecclesiastical court, those affected are barred from Holy Communion (see canon 915), and if they violate the prohibition against taking a ministerial part in celebrating the Eucharist or some other ceremony of public worship, they are to be expelled or the sacred rite suspended, unless there is a grave reason to the contrary. In the same circumstances, local ordinaries and parish priests lose their right to assist validly at marriages.

An automatic (latae sententiae) interdict is incurred by anyone using physical violence against a bishop, a person who, not being an ordained priest, attempts to celebrate Mass, or who, though unable to give valid sacramental absolution, attempts to do so, or hears a sacramental Confession. Automatic interdict is also incurred by anyone falsely accusing a priest of soliciting sexual favours in connection with Confession or attempting to marry while having a perpetual vow of chastity.

An interdict is also the censure that canon law says should be imposed on someone who, because of some act of ecclesiastical authority or ministry, publicly incites to hatred against the Holy See or the Ordinary, or who promotes or takes up office in an association that plots against the Church, or who commits the crime of simony.

== Notable local canonical interdicts ==
=== Norway ===
- Pope Innocent III placed the Kingdom of Norway under interdict in October 1198. Although King Sverre forged letters to show the interdict had been lifted, he and his subjects technically remained under interdict until Sverre's death in 1202.

=== England ===
- Pope Eugene III placed the kingdom of England under Papal Interdict in 1148 as king Stephen prohibited the bishops of England to attend a synod held in Rheims and punished Theobald Archbishop of Canterbury for attending. This interdict was lifted in 1151.
- Pope Innocent III placed the kingdom of England under an interdict for six years between March 1208 and July 1214, after King John refused to accept the pope's appointee Stephen Langton as Archbishop of Canterbury.

=== Scotland ===
- Following the rejection by Robert the Bruce (crowned King of Scotland in 1306) of papal mediation between England and Scotland, Pope John XXII placed Scotland under interdict in 1317 or 1318 because of continuing Scots raids into England; in 1328 the same Pope lifted the interdict in the light of the Treaty of Edinburgh–Northampton.

=== Hungary ===
- The town of Buda was placed under interdict by papal legate Niccolò Boccasini in 1303, who was sent there to build support for Charles of Anjou, Pope Boniface VIII's favoured candidate for the Hungarian Crown. The burghers of Buda retaliated by excommunicating the Pope and all his loyal bishops and priests.

=== Italy ===
- Rome itself was placed under interdict by Pope Adrian IV in 1155 a result of a rebellion led by the preacher, Arnold of Brescia.
- Pope Gregory XI placed the city of Florence under interdict in March 1376 during the War of the Eight Saints.
- Pope Sixtus IV decreed an interdict against the Republic of Florence in 1478 in response to the hanging of Bishop Francesco Salviati after his involvement in the Pazzi conspiracy.
- On 23 June 1482, Pope Sixtus IV decreed an interdict against the Republic of Venice, unless it abandoned within 15 days its siege of Ferrara. The Venetians managed to evade it by an appeal to a future council.
- On 27 April 1509, as he entered the War of the League of Cambrai, aiming to recover papal control of the Romagna, where Venice had seized several cities in 1503, Pope Julius II placed Venice under interdict until it accepted peace terms on 14 February 1510, when it was lifted.
- The Venetian Interdict of 1606–1607 is a better-known and more lengthy case. Pope Paul V placed the Republic of Venice under interdict in 1606 after the civil authorities jailed two priests.
- In 1909, the town of Adria in Italy was placed under interdict for 15 days after a local campaign against the move of a bishop.

=== Malta ===
- On 1 May 1930, the bishops of Malta published a Pastoral letter which placed voters of the progressive Compact parties (Constitutional Party, Labour Party) under interdict. This intervention in politics led to Governor Du Cane proclaiming a state of emergency and cancelling the 1930 Election on the basis that the elections were not free due to the interdict. This interdict was eventually lifted on June 3, 1932, however the Church still advised against voting for the Compact parties in the 1932 elections, leading to a win by the Nationalist Party.
- On 8 April 1961, the bishops of Malta personally interdicted the entire executive of the Malta Labour Party. Following this, the bishops would also impose the mortal sin on supporters of the Labour Party, specifically readers, distributors of and advertisers in the Party papers and voters and candidates of the Party. The 1962 elections were fought with the interdict still in place, with a clear proof of this being MLP supporters being buried in an unconsecrated part of the Addolorata Cemetery (known as the "Miżbla"), absolution being denied to supporters of the MLP, and Church bells ringing during MLP meetings in order to attempt at censoring Dom Mintoff and his party. These conditions led to a win by the Nationalist Party and the other parties who were in the anti-Communist coalition known as the "Umbrella Coalition". The Interdict was only lifted on 4 April 1969, with the help of Mgr. Emanuel Gerada, leading to the Church and the MLP reaching a formal peace.

=== France ===
- Pope Innocent III put the whole Kingdom of France under interdict on 13 January 1200 to force Philip II of France to take his wife Ingeborg of Denmark back. After a reconciliation ceremony, the interdict was lifted on 12 September 1200.

=== United States ===
- In 1955, white parishioners had refused a black priest entry to a chapel about 20 miles from New Orleans. Archbishop Joseph Rummel placed that chapel under interdict.

== Notable personal canonical interdicts ==
Bishop René Henry Gracida of Corpus Christi, Texas, interdicted a Roman Catholic politician in the late 20th century for supporting legal abortion; the unnamed individual died under interdict.

In June 2008, Raymond Leo Burke, in his capacity as the Archbishop of St. Louis, applied an interdict to a Sister of Charity, Louise Lears, judging her guilty of three grave canonical offenses against the Catholic Church's faith and teachings. Lears, a pastoral worker and educator, had publicly stated her belief that all of the church's ministries, including the priesthood, should be open to women. Lears received the interdict after attending an ordination ceremony, which the church does not recognize, of a woman to the priesthood at a Jewish synagogue by the WomenPriests movement.

== See also ==
- Excommunication (Catholic Church)
- Dima Yakovlev Law
- Magnitsky Act
- Magnitsky legislation
