= 1932 Maltese general election =

- 11–13 June 1932
- 32 seats in the Legislative Assembly; 17 seats in the Senate
Party	Leader	Vote %	Seats	+/–
Legislative Assembly (17 seats for a majority)
Nationalist	Ugo Mifsud	59.57	21	+8
Constitutional	Gerald Strickland	31.10	10	−5
Labour	Paul Boffa	8.57	1	−2
Senate (9 seats for a majority)
Nationalist		66.43	5	+1
Constitutional		33.57	2	−1
Appointed		–	10	0
This lists parties that won seats. See the complete results below.
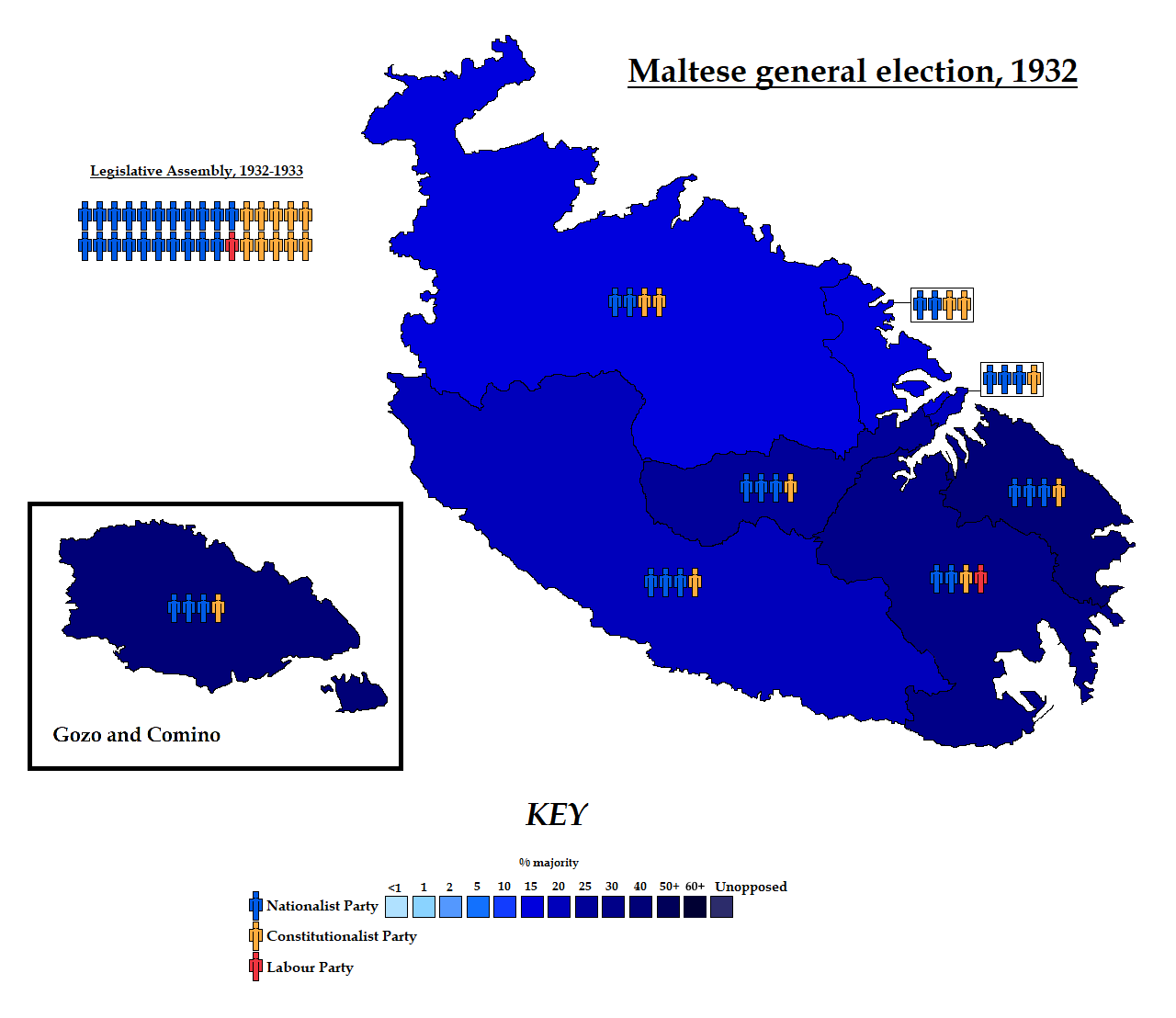
Prime Minister before	Prime Minister after
Gerald Strickland; Constitutional Party	Ugo Mifsud; Nationalist Party

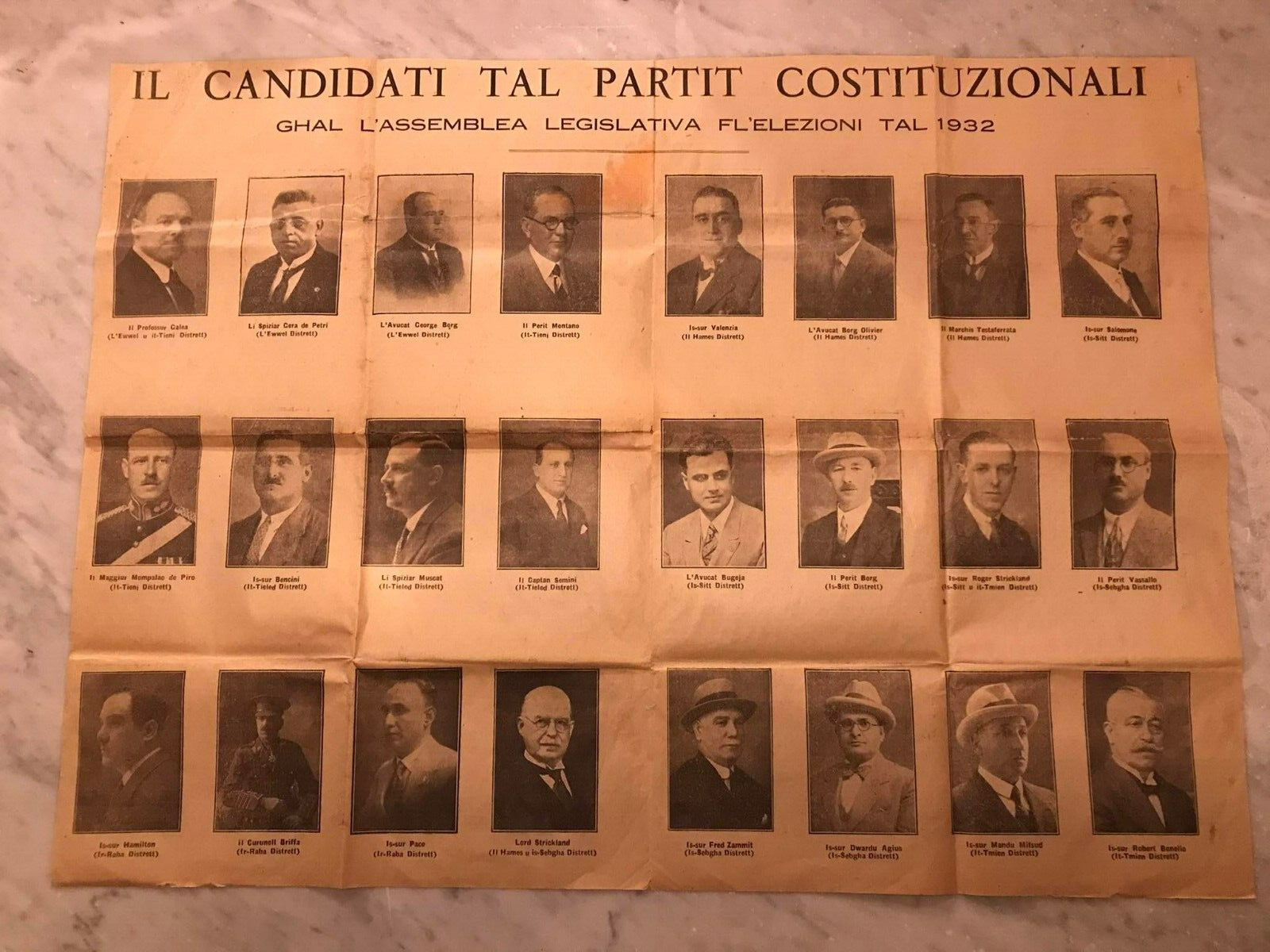
Constitutional Party election poster

General elections were held in Malta between 11 and 13 June 1932. The Nationalist Party emerged as the largest party, winning 21 of the 32 seats in the Legislative Assembly and five of the seven elected seats in the Senate.

== Electoral system ==
Members of the Legislative Assembly were elected using the single transferable vote system, whilst suffrage was limited to men meeting certain property qualifications.

== Results ==
=== Legislative Assembly ===
Party	Votes	%	Seats	+/–
Nationalist Party	28,777	59.57	21	+8
Constitutional Party	15,023	31.10	10	–5
Labour Party	4,138	8.57	1	–2
Independent Labour Party	238	0.49	0	New
Independents	129	0.27	0	–1
Total	48,305	100.00	32	0
Valid votes	48,305	99.27		
Invalid/blank votes	353	0.73		
Total votes	48,658	100.00		
Registered voters/turnout	52,610	92.49		
Source: Nohlen & Stöver

=== Senate ===
Party	First count		Second count		Seats	+/–
Party	Votes	%	Votes	%	Seats	+/–
Nationalist Party	4,566	65.40	4,543	66.43	5	+1
Constitutional Party	2,416	34.60	2,296	33.57	2	–1
Appointed members					10	0
Total	6,982	100.00	6,839	100.00	17	0
Source: Schiavone
