= 1927 Maltese general election =

- 7–9 August 1927
- Legislative Assembly
- All 32 seats in the Legislative Assembly; 17 seats needed for a majority
Party	Leader	Vote %	Seats	+/–
Constitutional	Gerald Strickland	41.49	15	+5
Nationalist	Ugo Mifsud	41.58	13	−2
Labour	William Savona	14.55	3	−4
Independents	–	2.39	1	+1
This lists parties that won seats. See the complete results below.
- Senate
- 7 of the 17 seats in the Senate
Party	Vote %	Seats	+/–
Nationalist	60.17	4	0
Constitutional	39.83	3	+1
This lists parties that won seats. See the complete results below.
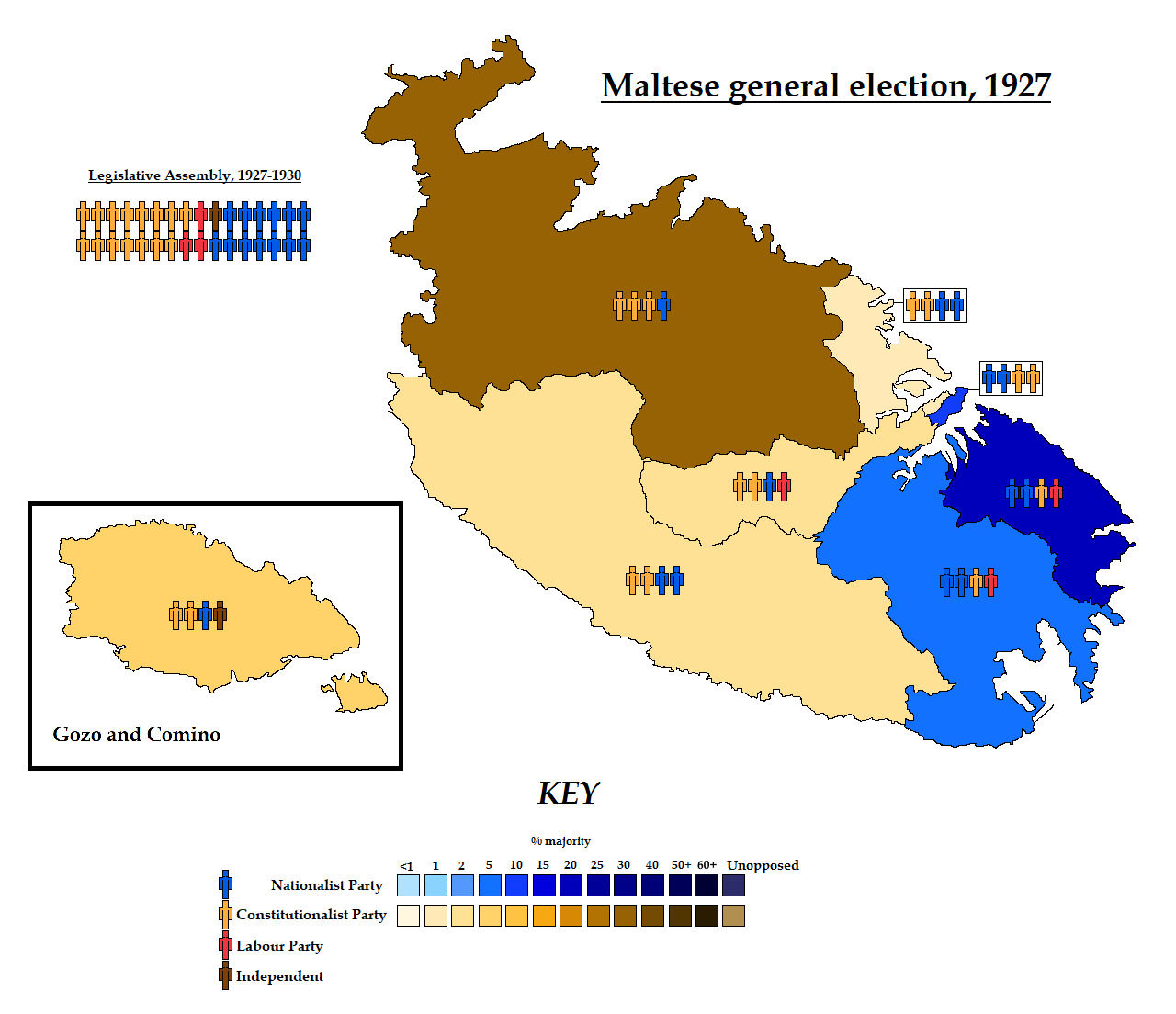
Legislative Assembly results by constituency
Prime Minister before	Prime Minister after
Ugo Mifsud; Nationalist	Gerald Strickland; Constitutional Party

General elections were held in Malta between 7 and 9 August 1927. Although the Nationalist Party received the most votes, the Constitutional Party emerged as the largest party, winning 15 of the 32 seats in the Legislative Assembly. The Nationalist Party remained the largest party in the Senate with four of the seven elected seats.

== Electoral system ==
The elections were held using the single transferable vote system, whilst suffrage was limited to men meeting certain property qualifications.

== Results ==
=== Legislative Assembly ===
Party	Votes	%	Seats	+/–
Nationalist Party	14,321	41.58	13	–2
Constitutional Party	14,290	41.49	15	+5
Labour Party	5,011	14.55	3	–4
Independents	822	2.39	1	+1
Total	34,444	100.00	32	0
Valid votes	34,444	99.20		
Invalid/blank votes	277	0.80		
Total votes	34,721	100.00		
Registered voters/turnout	44,089	78.75		
Source: Nohlen & Stöver

=== Senate ===
Party	First count		Second count		Seats	+/–
Party	Votes	%	Votes	%	Seats	+/–
Nationalist Party	2,410	58.07	2,230	60.17	4	0
Constitutional Party	1,654	39.86	1,476	39.83	3	+1
Labour Party	86	2.07			0	–1
Appointed members					10	0
Total	4,150	100.00	3,706	100.00	17	0
Source: Schiavone
