= 1945 Maltese general election =

- 10–12 November 1945
- 10 seats in the Parliament of Malta; 6 seats needed for a majority
| Party | Leader | Vote % | Seats | +/– |
|---|---|---|---|---|
| Labour | Paul Boffa | 76.20 | 9 | +8 |
| Independent | | 23.80 | 1 | +1 |
This lists parties that won seats. See the complete results below.
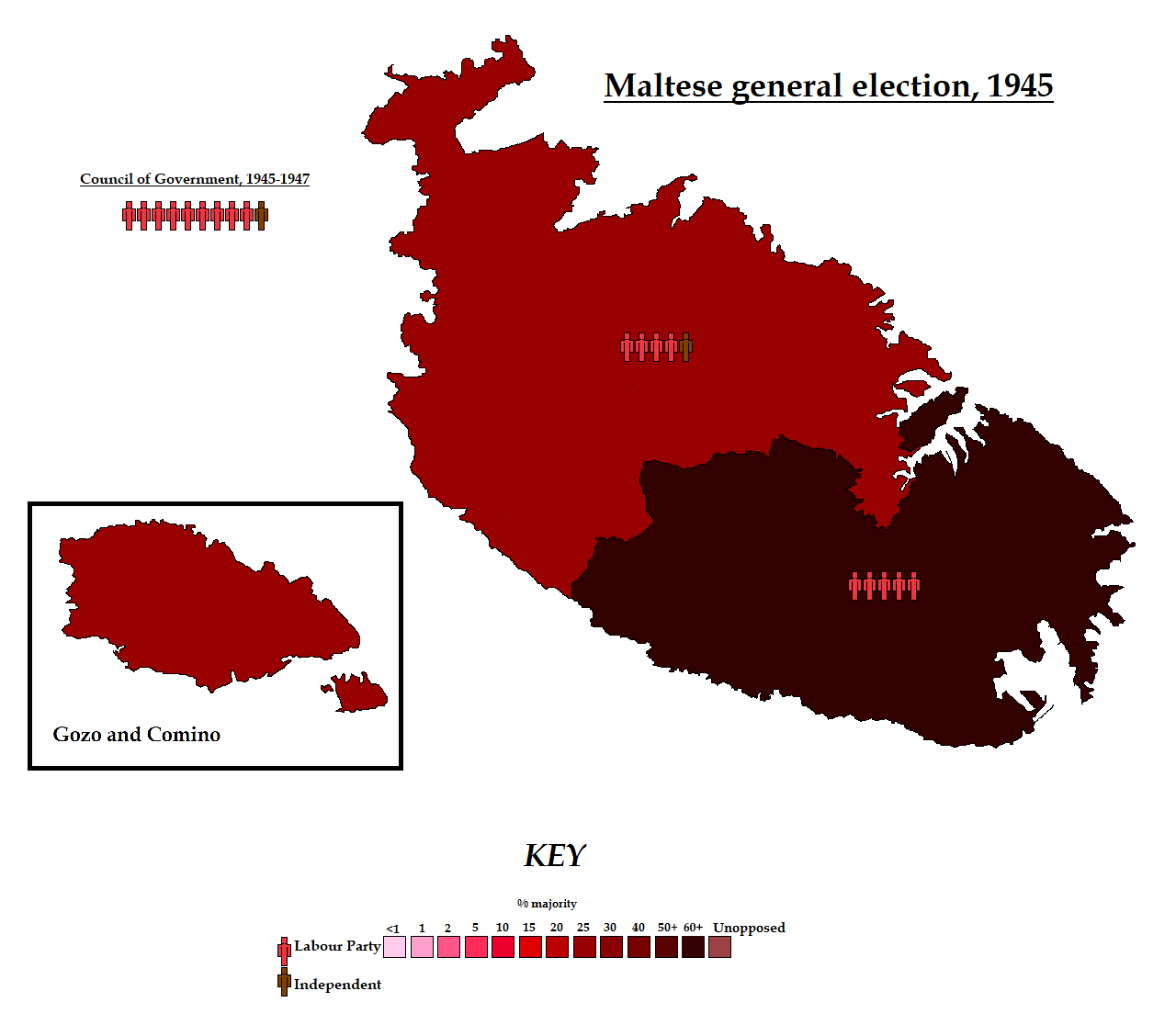

General elections were held in Malta between 10 and 12 November 1945. The Labour Party was the only party to contest the elections, and won nine of the 10 seats.

== Electoral system ==
The elections were held using the single transferable vote system, whilst suffrage was limited to men meeting certain property qualifications.

== Results ==
| Party | Votes | % | Seats | +/– |
|---|---|---|---|---|
| Labour Party | 19,071 | 76.20 | 9 | +8 |
| Independents | 5,958 | 23.80 | 1 | +1 |
| Total | 25,029 | 100.00 | 10 | 0 |
| Valid votes | 25,029 | 97.50 | | |
| Invalid/blank votes | 643 | 2.50 | | |
| Total votes | 25,672 | 100.00 | | |
| Registered voters/turnout | 61,203 | 41.95 | | |
Source: Nohlen & Stöver
