= 1956 Maltese United Kingdom integration referendum =

- 11–12 February 1956
- "Do you approve of the proposals as set out in the Malta Government Gazette of the 10th January, 1956?"

Results
Choice	Votes	%
Yes	67,607	77.02%
No	20,177	22.98%
Valid votes	87,784	97.17%
Invalid or blank votes	2,559	2.83%
Total votes	90,343	100.00%
Registered voters/turnout	152,783	59.13%

A referendum on integration with the United Kingdom was held in Malta on 11 and 12 February 1956. The proposals were approved by 77% of those who voted, on a turnout of 59%; the low turnout was partly because of a boycott by the Nationalist Party. The proposals were never fully implemented, and the country became an independent Realm within the British Commonwealth titled the State of Malta eight years later.

== Proposals ==
Under the proposals Malta would have had three seats of its own in the British House of Commons. In addition, the Home Office would take over responsibility for Maltese affairs from the Colonial Office. The UK parliament would have control of defence and foreign affairs, and eventually direct taxation, whereas the Maltese parliament would be responsible for all other areas of public life, including education and the position of the Catholic Church. Under the text of the referendum, agreements would be made with the United Kingdom with the objective of improving wages, employment opportunities and standards of living on the islands to parity with the rest of the UK.

== Background ==
In 1953, the Maltese government under the Nationalist Party put forward proposals for Malta to be given dominion status, which the UK government rejected, instead proposing a transfer of Maltese affairs from the Colonial Office to the Home Office. Both major political parties, the Nationalist Party and the Labour Party, found the counter-proposal to be inadequate. It was instead proposed that all-party talks should take place, which began in June 1954 by which time the 1953 Maltese general election had resulted in the Maltese Labour Party winning a majority, which had been fought on the Labour Party's proposal to integrate Malta into the UK. The chair of the talks, Alan Lennox-Boyd, ruled out Dominion status for Malta but agreed that Malta required constitutional revision.

The UK government formed the Malta Round Table Conference, which in December 1955 brought forward Command paper Cmd. 9657. Lennox-Boyd, Secretary of State for the Colonies, summarised the report as having considered and rejected alternative proposals to parliamentary representation, instead suggesting that Malta be given 3 MPs on the condition that "it was for the Maltese people themselves to determine and to demonstrate clearly and unmistakably whether the proposals of the Maltese Government corresponded with their own wishes".

The Maltese government scheduled a referendum following the publishing of the report. Lennox-Boyd said that he "did [his] best to dissuade [the Maltese Prime Minister] from proceeding with the referendum", saying he felt that the referendum was "premature", and that it should not take place until the UK parliament had come to its own decision on integration first. Dom Mintoff, Prime Minister of Malta, countered that it would be advantageous for Parliament to know what Malta felt before the debate. The conference came to the conclusion that it was within the Maltese government's power to arrange for a referendum to be held.

Lennox-Boyd said a key point for the British government was whether "we make a case for Malta without it being followed by many other places".

== Question ==
Do you approve of the proposals as set out in the Malta Government Gazette of the 10th January, 1956?

Lennox-Boyd said that the proposals asked in the referendum was "to all intents [...] identical" to the Maltese government's proposals to the Malta Round Table Conference.

== Results ==
Choice	Votes	%
For	67,607	77.02
Against	20,177	22.98
Total	87,784	100.00
Valid votes	87,784	97.17
Invalid/blank votes	2,559	2.83
Total votes	90,343	100.00
Registered voters/turnout	152,783	59.13
Source: Nohlen & Stöver

== Aftermath ==
Despite the results approving further integration with the UK, the low turnout allowed the opposition to claim that the result was inconclusive.

Lennox-Boyd said to the House of Commons following the referendum "Her Majesty's Government are in favour of the proposals in the Report [...] including the recommendation for Maltese representation at Westminister [sic] [...] We accept it unconditionally". However, the Government did not feel that the referendum met the report's conditions that "demonstrate clearly and unmistakably" the Maltese people wished for integration, giving the example of Newfoundland in 1948 requiring a second referendum after the first was inconclusive.

There were also concerns expressed by some British MPs that the representation of Malta at Westminster would set a precedent for other colonies, and influence the outcome of general elections. Malta became an independent Commonwealth realm on 21 September 1964 and a republic on 13 December 1974; after the expiry of a defence agreement with the United Kingdom, the last British forces left Malta on 31 March 1979, a date now marked as Freedom Day.
