= Ugo Pasquale Mifsud =

Maltese politician (1889–1942)

Sir Ugo Mifsud
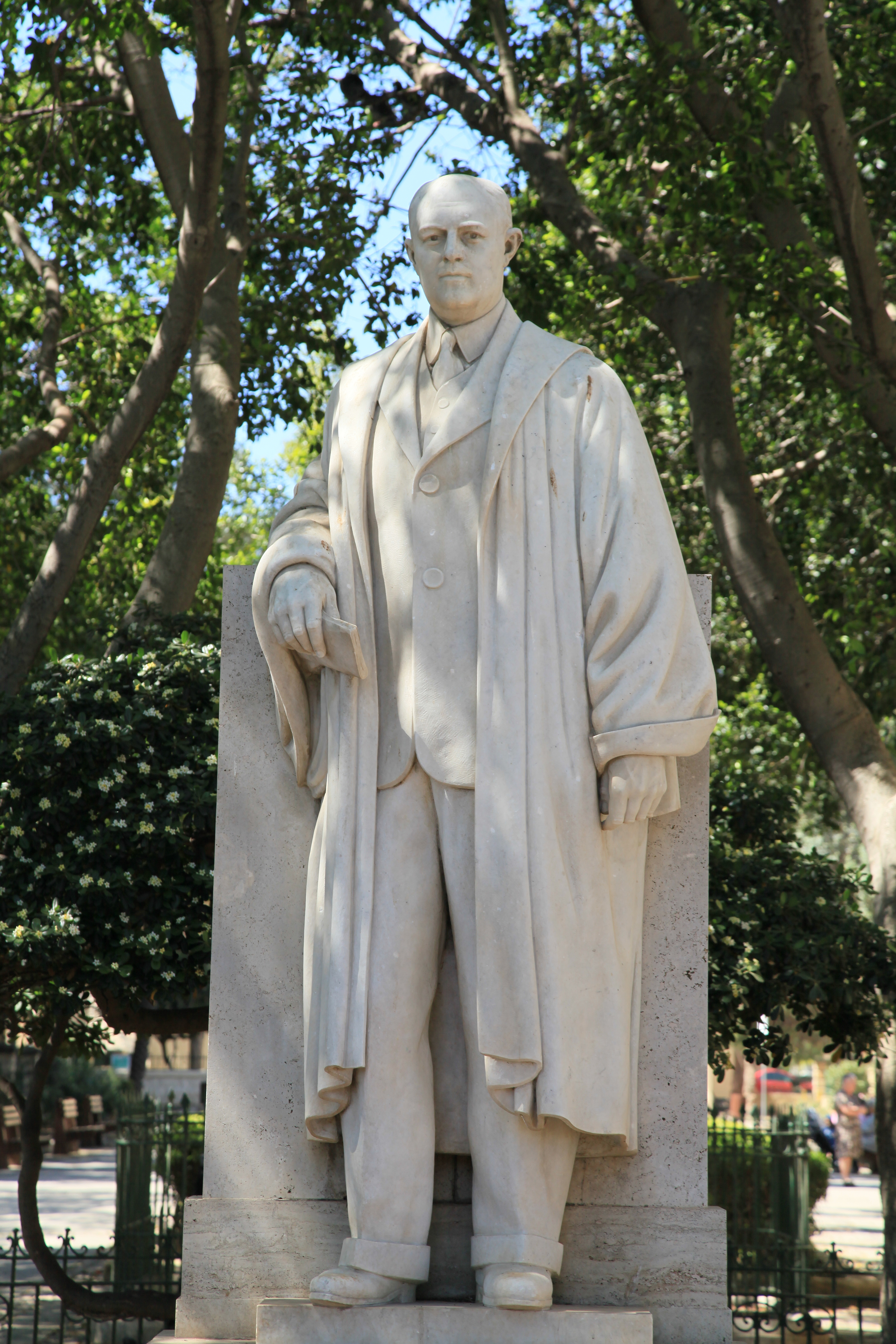
- Monument to Sir Ugo Mifsud at The Mall in Floriana

3rd Prime Minister of Malta
- In office 21 June 1932 – 2 November 1933
- Monarch: George V
- Governor: Sir David Campbell
- Preceded by: The 6th Count della Catena and 1st Baron Strickland
- Succeeded by: Position Abolished
- In office 22 September 1924 – 1 August 1927
- Monarch: George V
- Governor: Sir Walter Congreve; Sir John Philip Du Cane
- Preceded by: Francesco Buhagiar
- Succeeded by: The 6th Count della Catena

Personal details
- Born: 12 September 1889 Valletta, Crown Colony of Malta
- Died: 11 February 1942 (aged 52) Villa Francia, Lija, Crown Colony of Malta
- Party: Nationalist Party
- Spouse: Maria Francia

Sir Ugo Pasquale Mifsud (12 September 1889 – 11 February 1942) was a Maltese politician, the 3rd Prime Minister of Malta under British home rule, and the first to serve a full term in power. He held office from 1924 to 1927 and from 1932 to 1933. He was a member of the Nationalist Party and the Maltese Italian community.

== Biography ==
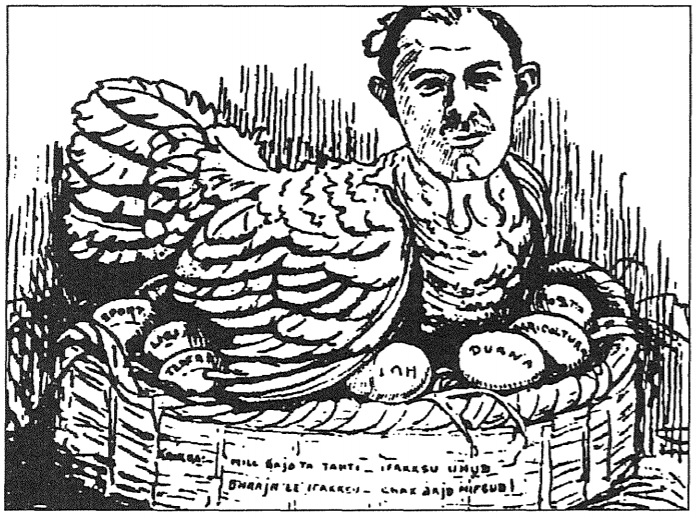
A cartoon in one of the Maltese-language newspapers in the Twenties lampooning the Nationalist prime minister, Sir Ugo Mifsud (note the play on the surname)

Born in Valletta to Judge Gio Batta Mifsud and Philomena Marianna Muscat, Ugo P. Mifsud studied at Malta's Lyceum and Royal University, graduating as a lawyer in 1910. He married Maria Beatrice ("Blanche") Francia in 1928.

Specialised in international law, Ugo P. Mifsud published in leading international journals such as the London International Law Notes and was appointed a member of the International Law Association, set up in Brussels, actively participating in its two-yearly international conferences. In 1928 Mifsud chaired the aerial and radio law committee at a conference in Warsaw, and represented Malta at a conference of the Empire Parliamentary Association in Canada. In 1934 he chaired the trade marks committee at a conference in Budapest.

When Sir Filippo Sciberras rallied a Maltese legislative assembly to draft a liberal Constitution to submit to the British colonial government, Mifsud was elected secretary of the sitting. At the 1921 elections under the Amery-Milner Constitution, Mifsud was elected to Parliament for the Unione Politica Maltese (UPM) for the Legislative Assembly.

In 1924, at 35, Mifsud succeeded to Francesco Buhagiar, becoming the youngest Prime Minister in the British Empire. Following the merger of the UPM with Enrico Mizzi's PDN, in 1926 Mifsud became co-leader of the newly formed Partito Nazionalista (PN). In the 1927 Birthday Honours he was knighted.

At the 1927 and 1932 elections Mifsud was re-elected in a landslide, holding again the premiership till 1933, when the 1921 Constitution was withdrawn by the colonial authorities.

During this term, in 1932, he travelled with a delegation to London to submit a memorandum to Sir Philip Cunliffe-Lister, Secretary of State for the Colonies, with a formal request for Malta to be placed under the Dominions Office as an independent member of the Commonwealth.

Mifsud also held several ministerial portfolios in the same period: Minister for Agriculture and Fisheries (1921–22, 1923–24), Minister for Posts (1921–22, 1923–24), Minister for Industry and Commerce (1921–24, 1932–33), Minister of Finance (1924–26), Minister of Justice (1926–27, 1932–33).

In 1939, Sir Ugo Mifsud was elected Member of the Council of Government. One of three [Nationalist Party (Malta)] members of the Council of Government members during the Second World War, he vehemently opposed the internment and illegal deportation in Uganda of his party leader and fellow colleague in the Council, Dr Enrico Mizzi, and other Maltese politicians without due process of law on suspicion of anti-British and pro-Italian activities.

On 9 February 1942, as the Council was debating, as a matter of urgency, the British Government's intention to deport these Maltese citizens, Mifsud suffered a heart attack while stressing the illegality of the government's intention. Two days later he died. He is buried at the Lija cemetery.

On the 21st anniversary of his death a marble monument at Floriana was erected to his memory.

== See also ==
- Prime Minister of Malta
- List of prime ministers of Malta
- Italia irredenta
