= Senate of Malta =

The Senate (Maltese: Senat) was the upper house of the Parliament of Malta between 1921 and 1933.

== History ==
The Amery-Milner constitution was promulgated in 1921 and provided for a bicameral Parliament with a 32-seat Legislative Assembly and a 17-seat Senate. The Assembly would be elected every three years and the Senate every six years.

The Senate consisted of seven elected members and ten appointed members. The elected members were elected in two districts using a two-round system. The appointed members represented five groups; the clergy, the nobility, graduates, commerce and the Trade Union Council, with each group having two members each. During its existence, elections for the Senate took place in 1921, 1927 and 1932.

The constitution was suspended in 1933, with subsequent constitutions creating unicameral legislatures.

== Presidents ==
Name	Term
Max Debono	28 October 1921–August 1927
Igino De Piro D'Amico	23 August 1927–October 1932
Luigi Preziosi	17 October 1932–1933
Source: Pirotta
