= Gerald Strickland, 1st Baron Strickland =

Maltese-British politician (1861–1940)

The Right Honourable The Lord Strickland GCMG
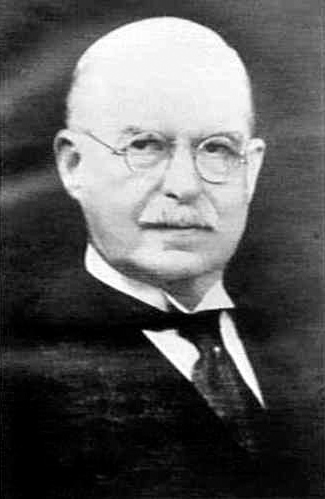
- Lord Strickland in the 1930s

4th Prime Minister of Malta
- In office 9 August 1927 – 21 June 1932
- Monarch: George V
- Governor: Sir John Du Cane; Sir David Campbell
- Preceded by: Sir Ugo Mifsud
- Succeeded by: Sir Ugo Mifsud

23rd Governor of New South Wales
- In office 14 March 1913 – 27 October 1917
- Premier: James McGowen; William Holman
- Preceded by: Lord Chelmsford
- Succeeded by: Sir Walter Davidson

15th Governor of Western Australia
- In office 31 May 1909 – 16 March 1913
- Premier: Newton Moore; Frank Wilson; John Scaddan
- Preceded by: Sir Frederick Bedford
- Succeeded by: Sir Harry Barron

9th Governor of Tasmania
- In office 28 October 1904 – 20 May 1909
- Premier: John Evans
- Preceded by: Sir Arthur Havelock
- Succeeded by: Sir Harry Barron

Member of Parliament for Lancaster
- In office 20 October 1924 – 9 February 1928
- Preceded by: John O'Neill
- Succeeded by: Robert Tomlinson
- Majority: 4,158 (13.1%)

Personal details
- Born: 24 May 1861 Valletta, Malta
- Died: 22 August 1940 (aged 79) Attard, Malta
- Resting place: St Paul's Cathedral, Mdina
- Party: Constitutional Party
- Other political affiliations: Conservative Party
- Spouses: Edeline Sackville (m. 1891–1918) Margaret Hulton (m. 1926–1940)
- Children: 8
- Education: Trinity College, Cambridge

Gerald Paul Joseph Cajetan Carmel Antony Martin Strickland, 6th Count della Catena, 1st Baron Strickland, GCMG (24 May 1861 – 22 August 1940), usually known between 1897 and January 1928 as Sir Gerald Strickland, was a Maltese and British politician and, eventually, peer, who served as Prime Minister of Malta, Governor of the Leeward Islands, Governor of Tasmania, Governor of Western Australia and Governor of New South Wales, in addition to sitting in the House of Commons and later in the House of Lords in the Parliament of the United Kingdom.

== Early life ==
Strickland was born in Valletta, the son of naval officer Commander Walter Strickland, from the ancient English Strickland family of Sizergh, and Maria Aloysia Bonici-Mompalao, the niece and heiress of Sir Nicholas Sceberras Bologna, fifth Count della Catena in Malta, whom Gerald succeeded in 1875. He was educated at St Mary's College, Oscott, and Trinity College, Cambridge (BA, LLB). Upon graduating, he was admitted to Inner Temple in 1887 entitled to practise as a barrister-at-law. He gained the rank of major in the service of the Royal Malta Militia.

Elected in 1886 to the council of the government of Malta, Strickland began to take an active part in Maltese politics at an early age and in December 1887, he accompanied Dr. Fortunato Mizzi – founder of the Maltese Nationalist Party – to the first Colonial Conference in London to submit a scheme for a legislative assembly. The result was that the new Maltese Constitution of December 1887 was largely based on the joint Strickland-Mizzi proposals. In the following year, he was appointed as Assistant Secretary to Malta in 1888 and held the office of Chief Secretary of Malta in 1889, a post which he held till July 1902 when to avert more troubles in Malta which were created by his orders-in-council to increase taxation, he was appointed as Governor of the Leeward Islands in the Caribbean.

Sir Gerald and Lady Edeline Strickland left Southampton for Antigua in September 1902, and took up residence at Government House, St Johns on arrival. He was appointed as Governor of Tasmania in 1904, serving as such until 1909, and then as Governor of Western Australia from 1909 to 1913. In the early years consequent upon Australian Federation, he was involved in the delicate matter of State rights and the developing nature of the appointment, role and salaries of governors. Appointed as Governor of New South Wales in March 1913, on 30 May 1913 he was made a Knight Grand Cross of the Order of St Michael and St George (GCMG). He was a supporter of the Eugenics Education Society.

== Political career ==
In 1917, Strickland returned to Malta and, after the grant of Self-Government, formed the Anglo-Maltese Party in 1921, which soon afterward amalgamated with the Maltese Constitutional Party to become the Constitutional Party under his leadership. Strickland was the leader of the Opposition between 1921 and 1927. In 1924, he won the seat of Lancaster for the Conservatives in the United Kingdom House of Commons. He left the House of Commons in 1928 upon being made a peer.

After the 1927 election, Strickland had a majority in the Legislative Assembly and became Head of the Ministry (the fourth Prime Minister of Malta) from August 1927 until 1932. Amongst the most important events of his government were the commencement of building works for St. Luke's Hospital in Gwardamanġia and his clash with the Senate, which led to the issue of Letters Patent which curtailed its powers and his concurrent clash with the ecclesiastical authorities.

On 1 May 1930, Sir Mauro Monsignor Caruana, Titular Archbishop of Rhodes and Bishop of Malta, and Mikiel Monsignor Gonzi, Bishop of Gozo, issued a pastoral letter, read in all the churches of Malta and Gozo. In it, Archbishop Caruana and Bishop Gonzi declared that whoever voted for the Constitutional Party and its former coalition partner, the Labour Party, committed a mortal sin. That year he narrowly avoided assassination.

This mortal sin was also committed by those who read Strickland's newspapers, printed by his Progress Press, namely the Daily Malta Chronicle and Ix-Xemx. He subsequently began publishing Il-Progress and Il-Berqa. The clash between the Catholic bishops and the Constitutional Party led to the suspension of the Maltese Constitution following consultations between the British Governor and London.

Between July 1932 and November 1933, Strickland was again the leader of the Opposition, and after the grant of a new Constitution in 1939, he became the leader of the elected majority in the Council of Government.

== Personal life ==
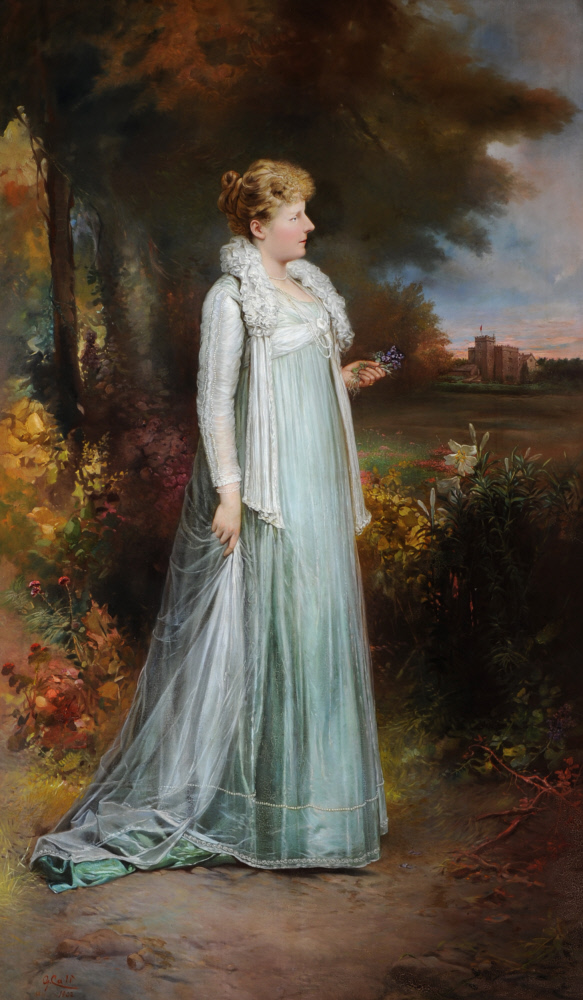
Lady Edeline Sackville in a painting by Giuseppe Calì

Strickland married Lady Edeline Sackville-West (1869–1918), the daughter of the 7th Earl De La Warr and the Honourable Constance Mary Elizabeth Cochrane-Wishart-Baillie, on 26 August 1891. They had six daughters, and two sons. Both their sons and one daughter died at an early age. Their first daughter married Henry Hornyold, became known as Mrs Hornyold-Strickland and chaired the Conservative Party Conference in 1947. Strickland and Lady Edeline had the following children:

- Reginald Strickland (1893–1893)
- Hon. Mary Christina Strickland (1895–1970)
- Hon. Cecilia Victoria Strickland (1897–1982)
- Hon. Mabel Edeline Strickland OBE (1899–1988)
- Walter Strickland (1901–1902)
- Margaret Angela Strickland (1903–1903)
- Hon. Henrietta May Strickland (1905–1975), who married Robert Tatton Bower
- Hon. Dr. Constance Teresa Strickland LMSSA (1911–1979)

On 31 August 1926, following the death of Lady Edeline in 1918, Strickland married Margaret Hulton, daughter of the newspaper proprietor Edward Hulton in the same church as his earlier wedding. She was made a Dame Commander of the Order of the British Empire (DBE) in the 1937 Coronation Honours. Strickland was appointed a Companion of the Order of St Michael and St George (CMG) in 1889, for rendering invaluable services during a severe cholera epidemic. He was promoted to Knight Commander of the Order of St Michael and St George in 1897. He was raised to the Peerage of the United Kingdom as Baron Strickland, of Sizergh Castle in the County of Westmorland, on 19 January 1928. He died at Villa Bologna, his residence in Attard, and is buried in the family crypt at St. Paul's Cathedral, Mdina.

== Honours ==
Knight Grand Cross of the Order of St Michael and St George (GCMG)	1913
Knight Commander of the Order of St Michael and St George (KCMG)	1897
Companion of the Order of St Michael and St George (CMG)	1889
King George V Coronation Medal	1911
King George V Silver Jubilee Medal	1935

== Bibliography ==
- Burkes Peerage, Baronetage and Knightage of the UK (106th ed.) (London 2002).
- Carnwath, Joan (2004). "Strickland, Gerald Paul Joseph Cajetan Carmel Antony Martin, Baron Strickland (1861–1940)". Oxford Dictionary of National Biography (online ed.). Oxford University Press. doi:10.1093/ref:odnb/36350. (Subscription, Wikipedia Library access or UK public library membership required.)
- Giles Ash, S., "The Nobility of Malta", Publishers Enterprises Group (PEG Ltd 1988).
- Koster, A., Prelates and politicians in Malta, (Amsterdam University 1977).
- Montalto, J., The Nobles of Malta-1530–1800, Midsea Books Ltd, Malta, 1980.
- York, Barry (October 2008). "His Excellency Sir Gerald Strickland, Count della Catena KCMG, BA, LLB". National Library of Australia News. XIX (1): 3–6.

Government offices
Preceded by Sir Walter Hely-Hutchinson	Chief Secretary of Malta; 1889–1902	Succeeded by Sir Edward Merewether
Preceded by Sir Henry Jackson	Governor of the Leeward Islands; 1902–1904	Succeeded by Sir Courtenay Knollys
Preceded by Sir Arthur Havelock	Governor of Tasmania; 1904–1909	Succeeded by Sir Harry Barron
Preceded by Sir Frederick Bedford	Governor of Western Australia; 1909–1913	Succeeded by Sir Harry Barron
Preceded by The Lord Chelmsford	Governor of New South Wales; 1913–1917	Succeeded by Sir Walter Davidson
Party political offices
New political party	Leader of the Constitutional Party; 1921–1940	Succeeded by Robert V. Galea
Political offices
New office	Leader of the Opposition of Malta; 1921–1927	Succeeded by Ugo Pasquale Mifsud
Preceded by Ugo Pasquale Mifsud	Prime Minister of Malta; 1927–1932	Succeeded by Ugo Pasquale Mifsud
Preceded by Ugo Pasquale Mifsud	Leader of the Opposition of Malta; 1932–1933	Vacant Constitution suspended Title next held by Enrico Mizzi
Parliament of the United Kingdom
Preceded by John Joseph O'Neill	Member of Parliament for Lancaster; 1924–1928	Succeeded by R. Parkinson Tomlinson
Titles of nobility
Preceded by Nicola Sceberras Bologna	Count of Catena; 1875–1940	Succeeded by Thomas Hornyold-Strickland
