= List of Maltese monarchs =

The Royal Standard of Malta during the reign of Elizabeth II, Queen of Malta

Cross of the Knights Hospitaller, called the Maltese Cross

The Mediterranean islands of Malta and Gozo had been ruled by Phoenician, Byzantine and Roman aristocrats, before passing to various European monarchies and eventually a republican government. Foreign monarchical rule over Malta lasted a total of 874 years. The Crown of Malta was patriated from that of the British for the first time in 1964 with the achievement of independence and abolished in 1974 with the establishment of the Republic of Malta.

The history, languages and culture of Malta and Sicily share many key events, including occupation by the Fatimids and an invasion by Roger I of Sicily in 1091. The islands parted ways in a decisive and permanent manner in 1799, when Malta became a British Crown colony. British colonial rule over Malta lasted 165 years. For an additional 10 years, Malta retained the British monarch as its independent head of state. Malta adopted a republican constitution on 13 December 1974, ending the monarchy altogether, and joined the European Union on 1 May 2004.

== Kingdom of Sicily and County of Malta ==
Flag of the Sovereign Military and Hospitaller Order of the Knights of St. John of Jerusalem, of Rhodes and of Malta

From the years 1090 and 1530, the Maltese Islands were a non-autonomous part of the Kingdom of Sicily and thus had the same sovereign. At this time the Nobility of Malta resided in or around Mdina. A strong cultural (and, to a lesser extent, political) connection to Sicily survived from 1530 to 1798 throughout the 268-year rule over Malta by the Knights Hospitaller.

In terms of the regional divisions of the islands, Malta Island was part the Valle di Mazzara province, Gozo was part of the Valle di Demona province and Comino was part of the Valle di Noto province.

=== Counts of Malta ===
- Roger I of Sicily (1091–1101), conqueror of Malta
- Simon of Sicily (1101–1105)
- Roger II of Sicily (1105–1154)
- William I of Sicily (1154–1166)
- William II of Sicily (1166–1189)
- Tancred of Sicily (1189–1190)
- Margaritus of Brindisi (1192–1197)
- Guglielmo Grasso (c.1197–1203)
- Enrico "Pescatore" (c.1203–1232)
- Nicoloso (c.1232–1266)
- Charles I of Naples (direct rule 1266–1282), usurper during the Sicilian vespers; with Nicoloso as claimant (1266–1281)
- Andreolo da Genova (1282–1300), with Roger de Flor as claimant (1285–1296)
- Roger of Lauria (1300–1305)
- Lukina de Malta and her husband Guglielmo Raimondo I (1305–1320)
- Guglielmo II (c.1320–1330)
- Alfonso Federigo d'Aragona (c.1330–1349)
- Pietro Federigo d'Aragona (c.1349–1350)
- Louis of Sicily (direct rule 1350–1355)
- Frederick the Simple (direct rule 1355–1360), with Niccolo Acciaioli as claimant (c.1357–1360)
- Guido Ventimiglia (c.1360–1362)
- Frederick the Simple (direct rule 1362–1366)
- Manfredo III Chiaramonte (c.1366–1370)
- Guglielmo III d'Aragona (c.1370–1377)
- Luigi Federigo d'Aragona (1377–1382)
- Manfredo III Chiaramonte (1382–1391)
- Elizabetta Peralta Chiaramonte (c.1391–1392)
- Guglielmo Raimondo III Moncada (c.1392–1393)
- Artale II Alagona (c.1393–1396)
- Guglielmo Raimondo III Moncada (c.1396–1397)
- Maria of Sicily (direct rule 1397–1401) with her husband Martin I of Sicily (direct rule by jure uxoris 1397–1409)
- Martin of Aragon (direct rule 1409–1410)
- Ferdinand I of Aragon (direct rule 1412–1416)
- Alfonso V of Aragon (direct rule 1416–1420)
- Antonio de Cardona (c.1420–1425)
- Gonsalvo Monroy (c.1426–1428),
- Alfonso V of Aragon (1428–1458)
- John II of Aragon (1458–1479)
- Ferdinand II of Aragon (1479–1516)
- Charles V, Holy Roman Emperor (1516–1530)

== Knights Hospitaller (1530–1798) ==
Although the Knights Hospitaller ruled Malta as sovereign princes, they held that privilege as a fiefdom, paying a tribute of the Maltese Falcon annually to the Viceroys of Sicily, payable on the feast of All Souls' Day.

- See: List of grand masters of the Knights Hospitaller

== France ==
- Occupied by French First Republic (1798–1800)

== British Crown (1799–1964) ==
=== House of Hanover ===
Name	Portrait	Birth	Marriage(s)	Death
George III; 1799–1820		4 June 1738; Norfolk House son of Frederick, Prince of Wales and Princess Augusta of Saxe-Gotha	Charlotte of Mecklenburg-Strelitz; St James's Palace; 8 September 1761; 15 children	29 January 1820; Windsor Castle aged 81
George IV; 29 January 1820–1830		12 August 1762; St James's Palace son of George III and Charlotte of Mecklenburg-Strelitz	(2) Caroline of Brunswick; St James's Palace; 8 April 1795; 1 daughter	26 June 1830; Windsor aged 67
William IV; 26 June 1830–1837		21 August 1765; Buckingham Palace son of George III and Charlotte of Mecklenburg-Strelitz	Adelaide of Saxe-Meiningen; Kew Palace; 13 July 1818; 2 children	20 June 1837; Windsor Castle aged 71
Victoria; 20 June 1837–1901		24 May 1819; Kensington Palace daughter of Prince Edward Augustus, Duke of Kent and Strathearn and Princess Victoria of Saxe-Coburg-Saalfeld	Albert, Prince Consort; St James's Palace; 10 February 1840; 9 children	22 January 1901; Osbourne House aged 81

=== House of Saxe-Coburg-Gotha ===
Name	Portrait	Birth	Marriage(s)	Death
Edward VII; 22 January 1901–1910		9 November 1841; Buckingham Palace son of Victoria and Albert, Prince Consort	Alexandra of Denmark; Windsor Castle; 10 March 1863; 6 children	6 May 1910; Buckingham Palace aged 68

=== House of Windsor ===
The house name Windsor was adopted in 1917, during the First World War. It was changed from Saxe-Coburg-Gotha because of wartime anti-German sentiment. The heirs of Elizabeth II, by royal proclamation, will remain part of the House of Windsor (even though their legal surname is Mountbatten-Windsor).

Name	Portrait	Birth	Marriage(s)	Death
George V 6 May 1910–1936		3 June 1865; Marlborough House son of Edward VII and Alexandra of Denmark	Mary of Teck; St James's Palace; 6 July 1893; 6 children	20 January 1936; Sandringham House aged 70
Edward VIII; 20 January – 11 December 1936		23 June 1894; Richmond son of George V and Mary of Teck	Wallis Simpson; France; 3 June 1937 no children	28 May 1972; Paris aged 77
George VI; 11 December 1936–6 February 1952		14 December 1895; Sandringham House son of George V and Mary of Teck	Elizabeth Bowes-Lyon; Westminster Abbey; 26 April 1923; 2 children	6 February 1952; Sandringham House aged 56
Elizabeth II; 6 February 1952–1964		21 April 1926; Mayfair daughter of George VI and Elizabeth Bowes-Lyon	Prince Philip, Duke of Edinburgh; Westminster Abbey; 20 November 1947; 4 children	8 September 2022 Balmoral Castle aged 96

== Maltese Crown (1964–1974) ==
Name	Portrait	Birth	Marriage(s)	Death
Elizabeth II; Queen of Malta (Reġina ta' Malta); 1964–1974 (Monarchy abolished on 13 December 1974)		21 April 1926; Mayfair daughter of George VI and Elizabeth Bowes-Lyon	Prince Philip, Duke of Edinburgh; Westminster Abbey; 20 November 1947; 4 children	8 September 2022 Balmoral Castle aged 96

When Malta acquired independence from the United Kingdom on 21 September 1964, Elizabeth II became the head of state and Queen of Malta. On 13 December 1974, Malta became a republic, abolishing the monarchy and establishing the President of Malta as the nation's head of state.

== See also ==
- History of Malta
  - Timeline of Maltese history
- List of heads of state of Malta
- List of governors of Malta
- List of prime ministers of Malta
