= Timeline of Maltese history =

This is a timeline of Maltese history, comprising important legal and territorial changes and political events in Malta and its predecessor states. To read about the background to these events, see History of Malta. See also the list of monarchs of Malta and list of governors of Malta (until its independence in 1964) and list of heads of state of Malta. See also History of banking in Malta.

Outline of Maltese History
Prehistory

Human history in Malta prior to the invention of writing.

Millennia: 3rd–4th⁣⁣⁣⁣ · 6th

Punic Period

Iron Age during which the Phoenicians and Carthaginians influenced the Western Mediterranean.

Centuries: 10th BC · 9th BC · 8th BC · 7th BC · 6th BC · 4th-5th BC

Roman Era

The Punic Wars between Rome and Carthage established Rome as a dominant power in the Mediterranean, until its collapse in 476 AD.

Centuries: 3rd BC · 2nd BC · 1st BC · 1st AD · 2nd AD · 3rd AD · 4th AD

Medieval Era

The Middle Ages or mediaeval period followed the fall of the Western Roman Empire to the Renaissance and the Age of Discovery.

Centuries: 5th · 6th - 8th · 9th · 10th · 11th · 12th · 13th · 14th · 15th

Knights of Malta era

The Renaissance and the Age of Discovery in Malta is characterised by the arrival of Hospitaller Knights in 1530 till the French occupation in 1798.

Centuries: 16th · 17th · 18th

British Empire Era

During the 19th and early 20th centuries, Malta was part of the British Empire until its independence in 1964.

Centuries:19th · 20th

Independent Malta

Malta gained its independence on 21st September 1964.

Centuries: 20th · 21st

== Prehistory ==
This period refers to human history in Malta prior to the invention of writing.

=== 6th millennium BC ===
Year	Event
5900 BC	DNA analysis has revealed that the first inhabitants originated from various European and African regions of the Mediterranean around 5900 BC. Most of the conifer forest that dominates the islands is cleared for mixed farming with fire and grazing and replaced by herbaceous vegetation, including Plantago lanceolata, Rumex, Asphodelus and Thelygonum.

=== 3rd - 4th millennium BC ===
Year	Event
3850 BC to 2350 BC	In 3850 BC, a second colonisation arrived from Sicily and remained on the island for 1,500 years. More intensive agriculture, with a higher focus on cereals. Construction of the megalithic temples of Ġgantija, Ħaġar Qim, Mnajdra, Ta' Ħaġrat, Skorba, Tarxien and Tas-Silg and the Ħal Saflieni Hypogeum.

== Punic Period ==
This period refers to the period when Phoenicians and Carthaginians influenced the Western Mediterranean during the Iron Age.

=== 10th century BC ===
Year	Event
1000 BC	The colonisation of the Maltese Islands by the Phoenicians begins. Earliest evidence of commerce and increased contacts with surrounding Mediterranean cultures. The Phoenicians were present on Malta, which they called Ann, before the end of the 2nd millennium BC.

=== 8th century BC ===
Year	Event
720 BC	A Phoenician colony, Maleth, is founded in present-day Cospicua in the Grand Harbour Malta.

=== 7th century BC ===
Year	Event
700 BC	A Punic temple, dedicated to the mother goddess Astarte, is built over the remains of the Tas-Silġ megalithic temples. (to 200 BC)

=== 6th century BC ===
Year	Event
539 BC	Cyrus the Great, founder of the Persian Empire, conquers Phoenicia.

=== 4th - 5th century BC ===
Year	Event
480 BC	The islands come under the control of Carthage, a former Phoenician colony, and rapidly develop into a Carthaginian naval base, also shown by numerous Carthaginian coins found in Malta. A number of Greek coins from Athens and Corinth indicate a peaceful coexistence with Greeks in Malta and trade with Greek settlements in Eastern Sicily.

== Roman Era ==
The Punic Wars between Rome and Carthage established Rome as a dominant power in the Mediterranean, until its collapse in 476 AD.

=== 3rd century BC ===
The First Punic War lasted between 264 BC to 241 BC, while the Second Punic War was between 221 BC and 202 BC. During the First Punic War, Malta was raided by the Romans but remained under Carthaginian control.

Year	Event
218 BC	Invasion of Malta by Titus Sempronius Longus, the Roman historian Livy records that the local garrison surrendered without a fight.
218 BC	Malta is incorporated into the Roman Republic, within the province of Sicily.
218 BC	Beginnings of the Maltese textile industry.

=== 2nd century BC ===
Year	Event
200 BC to 100 BC	A Roman temple, dedicated to the goddess Hera, is built over the remains of the Tas-Silġ megalithic temples. The Cippi of Melqart, a pair of Phoenician marble cippi, are dedicated to the god Melqart by inscriptions in Ancient Greek and Phoenician, probably at the Temple of Hercules at Marsaxlokk. Their subsequent discovery in the late 17th century was key to the modern understanding of the Phoenician language. The Cippi and numerous coins evidence a strong Punic and Greek culture present on the islands. Commencement of a rapid rise in the Mediterranean sea level from around 2.5 meters below current levels to present levels, over the subsequent four hundred years.
150 BC to 146 BC	Third Punic War.

=== 1st century ===
Year	Event
41	The Maltese are granted municipal privileges by Rome.
60	Saint Paul shipwrecked on the island.
60	Saint Publius Prince of Malta. First Bishop of Malta.

=== 2nd century ===
Year	Event
117 to 138	Malta becomes a municipium during the reign of Hadrian.

=== 4th century ===
Year	Event
395	Western Roman rule over Malta, following the final division of the Roman Empire. (to 454)
400	A Western Roman church is built over the remains of the Tas-Silġ megalithic temples. (to 600)

== Medieval Era ==
The Middle Ages or mediaeval period followed the fall of the Western Roman Empire to the Renaissance and the Age of Discovery.

=== 5th century ===
Year	Event
454	Malta is occupied by the Vandals.
464	Malta is occupied by the Goths.

=== 6th - 8th century ===
Year	Event
533	Belisarius restores the Maltese Islands to the Byzantine Empire for the next three hundred years.

=== 9th century ===
Year	Event
870	Malta is conquered by Aghlabid Arabs.
870	The fortified Roman settlement of Melita, on the highlands in the centre of Malta, is reduced in size, further fortified, and renamed Medina, precursor to the Medieval city of Mdina.
870	The Arabs construct a fort on the site of present-day Fort St Angelo.
870	Improved agriculture and irrigation systems are introduced, including the 'noria' or waterwheel; cotton and citrus fruits are introduced to Malta.

=== 10th century ===
Year	Event
909	Fatimids conquered Malta.

=== 11th century ===
Year	Event
1053–54	The Byzantine Empire unsuccessfully attempts to recapture the islands.
1091	The Norman Count Roger I of Sicily invades Malta and the Muslim inhabitants negotiate a peaceful surrender. Gozo is sacked by the Normans.

=== 12th century ===
Year	Event
1122	Arab uprising against the Normans in Malta.
1127	Norman control over Malta is consolidated under Roger II of Sicily.
1127	A Norman governor is installed, and Norman soldiers are garrisoned in Malta's three main castles.
1127	Christianity re-established as the Islands' dominant religion.
1144	Second attempt by the Byzantine Empire to recapture the Islands.
1154	The Catholic Church in Malta is incorporated into the See of Palermo.
1192	Margaritus of Brindisi was created first Count of Malta, perhaps for his unexpected success in capturing Empress Constance contender to the Sicilian throne. (to 1194, forfeited by House of Hohenstaufen)
1194	Malta and Sicily are ruled by the Swabians (House of Hohenstaufen). (to 1266)

=== 13th century ===
Year	Event
1223	The exile to Malta of the entire male population of the town of Celano (Italy).
1224	Expulsion of all Muslims from Malta and Sicily.
1240	Stationing of a Norman and Sicilian (Swabian) Garrison on Malta in 1240
1266	Malta and Sicily are ruled by the Angevins. (to 1283)
1283	Malta and Sicily are ruled by the Crown of Aragon. (to 1530)

=== 14th century ===
Year	Event
1350	Grant in fief of lands 'Diar el Bniet' by Louis of Sicily (House of Aragon) to Francesco Gatto on 4 January 1350, by a privilegium given at Messina, the fief having reverted to the Crown after it had been held by Michele Bava.
1350	First Incorporation of the Maltese Islands into the Royal Domain (Kingdom of Sicily). (to 1357)
1356	Giacomo Pelegrino is noted as 'Capitano della Verga' ('Hakem').
1397	Second Incorporation of the Maltese Islands into the Royal Domain (Kingdom of Sicily). (to 1420)
1397	Establishment of the Università, a form of local government, in Malta.

=== 15th century ===
Year	Date	Event
1419		The Militia List is drawn up, giving information about the population of Malta in the Middle Ages.
1420		The 'Consiglio Popolare' is mentioned when King Alphonsus of Aragon mortgaged the islands to Antonio Cardona.
1425		Uprising by the Maltese against Don Gonsalvo Monroy during his absence from the island, Count of Malta.
1425		His wife Donna Costanza is held hostage in the Castellamare (Fort St Angelo)
1425		Monroy appears before the Court of Sicily demanding that the strongest possible measures be taken against the insurgents.
1425		The Maltese insurgents repel an attempt by the Viceroy of Sicily to bring the island to order
1425		Maltese representatives appear before the same Court, offering to "redeem" the Islands by repaying the 30,000 florins originally paid by Monroy for his fiefdom over Malta, and asking King Alfonso to incorporate the Islands into his Royal Domains
1425		Monroy agrees to the terms but demands hostages to be held for as long as his wife is held in Malta. The impasse is resolved when Antonio Inguanez offers his two sons as hostages
1425		Negotiations drag on for several months during which only 10,000 florins are collected and the negotiated time elapses. However Monroy dies retaining for his heirs only a third of the sum collected and ordering that another third be returned to the Maltese. The last third he left to the King to be spent on strengthening the fortifications of Malta.
1425		Impressed by the loyalty of his Maltese subjects, the King declares Malta to be the most notable gem in his Crown. The old capital city of Mdina acquires the name Città Notabile, as a result.
1425		The Maltese do not submit to Aragonese rule until the Magna Charta Libertatis granting them their new rights is delivered to them
1427	3 January	King Alfonso incorporates Malta to the Crown of Aragon (Kingdom of Sicily), and promises never to grant Malta as a fief to any third party.
1429		The Hafsid Berbers attempt to capture Malta.
1436		In the 'Rollo' (inventory) of the benefices of the churches and chapels in Malta and Gozo, held by Bishop de Mello, ten established chapels are mentioned: The Cathedral of Mdina and the Church of San Lorenzo a Mare (Birgu), the 'Nativity of the Virgin' (Naxxar), 'Saint Helen' (Birkirkara), 'Saint George' (Qormi), 'Assumption of the Virgin Mary (Bir Miftuh/Gudja ), Saint Philip of Aggira (Zebbug), 'Saint Nicholas of Bari' (Siggiewi), 'Saint Catherine of Alexandria' (Zejtun and Zurrieq), Saint Domenica' (Dingli), and 'the Nativity of the Virgin' (Mellieha).

== Knights of Malta era ==
The Renaissance and the Age of Discovery in Malta is characterised by the arrival of Hospitaller Knights in 1530 till the French occupation in 1798.

=== 16th century ===
Year	Date	Event
1522		Suleiman I drives the Military Hospitaller Knights of St. John of Jerusalem out of Rhodes.
1530	26 October	In an effort to protect Rome from Islamic invasion, Emperor Charles V grants the Maltese Islands to the Knights of St. John of Jerusalem in perpetual fief.
1531		The Knights stage their first attacks from their new naval base in Malta, forming part of a Christian fleet under the command of Admiral Andrea Doria in attacks on the Turks at Modone, on the Ottoman fort at Coronna and, in 1535, on Tunis.
1533		The Ottomans and Barbary corsairs attack Gozo.
1535		First known celebration of Carnival in Malta.
1540		The Ottomans and Barbary corsairs under the command of Dragut attack Gozo, and 50 Gozitans are enslaved.
1541		The Ottomans and Barbary corsairs attack Gozo.
1544		The Ottomans and Barbary corsairs under the command of Dragut attack Gozo. Dragut's brother is killed during a counterattack led by Governor of Gozo Giovanni Ximenes.
1545		The Ottomans and Barbary corsairs attack Gozo.
1546		The Ottomans and Barbary corsairs attack Gozo.
1547		The Ottomans and Barbary corsairs attack Gozo and attempt an invasion of Malta at Marsaxlokk under the command of Dragut.
1550	June	Andrea Doria and Claude de la Sengle, bailli of the French langue of the Knights, capture and massacre the population of Mahdia, in Tunisia. (to September)
1551	May	An Ottoman fleet under the command of Sinan Pasha, Salah Rais and Dragut commences a series of attacks on eastern Sicily and Malta, in revenge for the events in Mahdia.
1551	18 July	The Ottoman fleet arrives in Malta and lands some 10,000 men at Marsa Muscietto. They reconnoiter Birgu and stage a short-lived siege on Mdina, but retreat and abandon the island by 21 July.
1551	22 July	Invasion of Gozo: The Ottoman fleet lands on Gozo and starts bombarding the island's Castello on 24 July.
1551	26 July	Governor of Gozo Galatian de Sesse surrenders the Castello to Sinan Pasha; the majority of the island's inhabitants (some 5,000 to 7,000 people) are enslaved and are taken to North Africa and later to Constantinople.
1551	30 July	The Ottomans sail south to Tripoli, and besiege the city which was held by the Hospitallers.
1551	15 August	Governor Gaspard de Vallier surrenders Tripoli to the Ottomans and negotiates a truce that ensures safe passage to Malta for the Knights of the garrison, but excludes the Maltese, Calabrian and Rhodian soldiers, who are auctioned off into slavery.
1551		Pope Julius III suggests that the Knights should abandon Malta, and retreat to Messina or Syracuse.
1552	14 January	Construction of Fort Saint Elmo, in what later became Valletta, commences.
1552		Construction of Fort Saint Michael, in Senglea.
1552	April	Fearing further razzias by Turks and Barbary corsairs, one thousand Maltese flee Malta, seeking refuge in Sicily.
1553		Charles V offers Mahdia to the Order of Saint John but the Order decline, so he orders the destruction of the city.
1553		Juan de Vega prohibited exportation of wheat to Malta so mills were built to prevent starvation.
1557	21 August	Jean Parisot de Valette is elected Grand Master of the Knights of Malta.
1560		The Knights of Malta escalate their corsairing activities in the western Mediterranean. (to 1565)
1560		Barbary corsairs attack Gozo.
1561		The Holy Inquisition is established in Malta. Domenico Cubelles is the first Inquisitor.
1563		Barbary corsairs attack Gozo.
1564	December	The Ottoman war council in Constantinople decrees that Malta is to be invaded and conquered.
1565	30 March	Ottoman fleet leaves Constantinople for Malta; Queen Elizabeth remarks: "If the Turks should prevail against the Isle of Malta, it is uncertain what further peril might follow to the rest of Christendom."
1565	9 April	The Spanish Viceroy of Sicily, Don García de Toledo y Osorio, a tours the Island's fortifications; he promises the Knights that in the coming invasion they need only hold out until June, when he would bring his armada back to assist Malta.
1565	16 April	Evacuation to Sicily of "a great number of people" from Malta, including large numbers of Maltese nobility, in anticipation of the imminent invasion. (to 13 May)
1565	18 May	Ottoman armada sighted off the coast of Malta, signalling the start of the Great Siege of Malta.
1565	19 May	A storm prevents the Turkish fleet from landing at Marsaxlokk; the vessels are sheltered in Ġnejna Bay and at Għajn Tuffieħa.
1565	20 May	The Turkish fleet anchors at Marsaxlokk, moved to Żejtun and sets up camp at Marsa.
1565	23 June	Fort St. Elmo falls to the Turks.
1565	23 June	Turkish commanders order all the dead Knights found in St. Elmo to be beheaded; their mutilated bodies are floated across Grand Harbour on planks towards the bastions of Senglea and Birgu.
1565	29 June	Four galleys land in the north of Malta, bringing 600 soldiers, 42 knights, 56 gunners and numerous volunteers, to reinforce the Island's defences; they walk to Mdina by night, and then on to Birgu the following morning.
1565	3 July	The Turkish fleet is transported on rollers, overland, from Marsamxett Harbour to Grand Harbour, in preparation for an assault on Senglea. (to 12 July)
1565	8 July	The Turkish forces are reinforced with the arrival of 29 vessels and 2,500 warriors accompanied by the Bey of Algiers.
1565	9 July	Reinforcements sent by Viceroy Don García de Toledo fail to make harbour, as a result of the fall of Fort St. Elmo, and return to Sicily.
1565	12 July	Senglea is besieged.
1565	7 September	Don Garcia's reinforcements, known as the Grande Soccorso ("great relief"), finally arrive,
1565	11 September	Turkish forces retreat from Malta.
1566	28 March	The founding of Malta's new capital city, Valletta. A general strengthening of Malta's fortifications is undertaken.
1572		Barbary corsairs attack Gozo.
1574		Barbary corsairs attack Gozo.
1583	18 October	Barbary corsairs from Bizerte attack Gozo, sack Rabat, and enslave 70 people.
1592	7 May	A plague epidemic begins, killing around 3,000 people until its end in September 1593.
1598		Barbary corsairs attack Gozo.
1599		Barbary corsairs attack Gozo.

=== 17th century ===
Year	Date	Event
1605		Garzes Tower built
1610	16 February	Wignacourt towers built (to 1620)
1614	6 July	Razzia by the Ottoman Empire.
1615	21 April	Wignacourt Aqueduct inaugurated
1616		William Lithgow reports that on a visit to Malta he "saw a Spanish soldier and a Maltese boy burnt in ashes, for the public profession of sodomy". The following day more than one hundred young men flee to Sicily for fear of suffering a similar fate.
1623		A plague outbreak kills around 40 people.
1634	12 September	A gunpowder factory explosion in Valletta kills 22 people.
1637		Lascaris towers built (to 1652)
1655		A plague outbreak kills 20 people.
1658	March	De Redin towers built (to 1659)
1667		Sopu Tower built
1670	15 June	Fort Ricasoli built (to 1693)
1675	24 December	A plague epidemic begins, killing around 11,300 people until its end in August 1676.

=== 18th century ===
Year	Date	Event
1710		First grant in favour of locals (including a woman) of a title of nobility to have been created by the Grand Masters. On 24 December 1710, Grand Master Perellos granted the title of Baron of Gomerino jointly to Paolo and Beatrice Testaferrata.
1715		Many coastal batteries and redoubts are built
1720		Perellos Tower built
1723	14 September	Fort Manoel built (to 1755)
1732	9 January	The Manoel Theatre (then known as the Teatro Pubblico) opens in Valletta with a performance of Scipione Maffei's classic tragedy Merope.
1733	7 July	Barbary corsairs from Sfax land at Ramla Bay, Gozo and enslave a family of 8 people.
1749	29 June	Conspiracy of the Slaves
1758		Fort Chambray built
1760		After the death of the Baron Paolo Testaferrata, the office of 'Depositario' within the Inquisition was continued by his widow Vincenza Matilde Testaferrata. With the exception of a short period, she remained in office until 1778.
1775	8 September	Rising of the Priests
1792		Fort Tigné built
1797		By a Papal brief dated 3 March 1797, Bishop Vincenzo Labini and all his successors in the diocese of Malta, were given the title of 'Bishop of Malta and Archbishop of Rhodes'. This privilege was suppressed in 1928, and the title was changed to 'Archbishop, Bishop of Malta'.
1798	9 June	Napoleon invades Malta. Mdina (Notbile) capitulates on 10 June. The act of capitulation of Mdina is signed on the one part by Vincenzo Barbara representing the French Republic and the Hakem together with the jurats representing the people.
1798	12 June	The Order capitulates. The Act of capitulation of Malta is signed on 12 June by on the one part by Napoleon on behalf of the French Republic, on the other six signed on behalf of the Order, the people of Malta and the King of Spain.
1798	12 June	The Commission of Government is appointed. General Claude Henri Belgrand de Vaubois is appointed Military Governor. The islands are divided into 12 municipalities.
1798		Slavery, the Roman Inquisition, and all titles of nobility are abolished in Malta.
1798	October	Tsar Paul I of Russia become de facto Grand Master of the Order, and orders the creation of a "Throne of Malta," in the Vorontsov Palace in St. Petersburg (now on display in the State Hermitage Museum).
1798	28 October	The French forces in Gozo surrender and the island becomes independent. First petition for the establishment of a separate Roman Catholic diocese on Gozo, led by Archpriest Saverio Cassar sent a day later.
1799		Maltese uprising against the French following extensive pillaging of Maltese churches and cathedrals. Britain takes Malta under its protection, in the name of the Kingdom of the Two Sicilies. The Union Jack flies over Valletta for the first time, alongside the Neapolitan flag.
1800	4 September	The French surrender. General Vaubois surrendered and with Rear Admiral Villeneuve, Major General Pigot and Captain Martin, signed the articles of Capitulation. Although 20,000 Maltese died during the uprising, not one Maltese was present to sign the document. Malta and Gozo become a Protectorate.

== British Empire Era ==
During the 19th and early 20th centuries, Malta was part of the British Empire until its independence in 1964.

=== 19th century ===
Year	Date	Event
1801		Tsar Paul I of Russia demands the return of Malta to the Knights. A Statue of the great German leader is established for peace amends
1801		Ball was appointed Civil Commissioner in May 1803 and immediately instructed the removal of Neapolitan forces from the Island.
1801	24 June	Admiral Sir Alexander Ball is sent to Malta as Plenipotentiary Minister of His British Majesty for the Order of Saint John, with orders to evacuate the British forces from the Islands, and to prepare for their return to the Knights of St. John.
1802		First Declaration of Rights issued in Malta: Dichiarazione dei Diritti degli Abitanti di Malta e Gozo, including the right to freedom of conscience under the rule of law.
1802		Under the Peace of Amiens, Britain is ordered to return Malta to the Knights of St John, but facing imminent hostilities by Napoleonic France, Britain chooses not to comply.
1806	18 July	A gunpowder magazine explosion in Birgu kills around 200 people.
1807	4 April	Beginning of the Froberg mutiny at Fort Ricasoli.
1809	23 June	The first Maltese bank, the Anglo Maltese Bank, was formed by Maltese and British Merchants under the Governance of Rear Admiral Sir Alexander Ball.
1809		Ball dies in October and is succeeded by the military commander, Major-General Hildebrand-Oakes.
1812	1 May	Formation of second Maltese bank, the Banco Di Malta, which was also known as Banco Maltese.
1813	28 March	A plague epidemic begins, killing around 4,500 people until its end in May 1814.
1813	23 June	Civil Commissioner Sir Hildebrand-Oakes is replaced by Sir Thomas Maitland, the first to be described by the British as 'Governor'. Malta becomes a crown colony.
1813		Malta is granted the Bathurst Constitution.
1814		Under the Treaty of Paris, and subsequently ratified by the Congress of Vienna, Malta status as a British Crown Colony is confirmed.
1814		The Grand Harbour becomes an important shipping waystation, eventually serving as the headquarters for the Mediterranean Fleet. (to 1930)
1831	20 June	The diocese of Malta is separated from that of Palermo.
1835		Malta was granted a Constitution providing for a Council of Government of seven members of whom three were to be nominated Maltese representatives.
1836	30 December	Second petition for a separate Roman Catholic diocese for Gozo is presented to Pope Gregory XVI.
1849		Malta was granted a Constitution providing for a Council of Government of eighteen members of whom eight were to be elected by the people.
1853		The Crimean War; Malta serves as a hospital base for wounded combatants, and acquires the nickname Nurse of the Mediterranean. (to 1856)
1855	9 June	Three Gozitan representatives personally petition Pope Pius IX for a separate Roman Catholic diocese for Gozo; the pontiff promises his support.
1860	25 October	The Colonial Office in London approves the establishment of a separate Roman Catholic diocese for Gozo.
1864	16 September	Pope Pius IX issues a papal bull entitled Singulari Amore (With remarkable love), separating the islands of Gozo and Comino from the diocese of Malta; seven days later, Michele Francesco Buttigieg is elected first Bishop of Gozo.
1869	17 November	Opening of the Suez Canal. This greatly enhanced the importance of the Grand Harbour to British merchant marine and naval shipping.
1870		J.S. Tucker proposes the construction of a railway from Valletta to Mdina.
1878		21 titles of nobility were successfully claimed by various individuals before a Royal Commission.
1880		In education, "Anglicization" of Maltese students becomes a matter of policy.
1883	28 February	The Malta Railway service is inaugurated, with service from Valletta to Floriana, Ħamrun, Msida, Birkirkara, Lija, San Antonio, Attard, Mosta (San Salvatore), and Mdina.
1885	8 September	(Otto Settembre) is recommended as a national holiday, commemorating the victory of the Knights and the Maltese over the Ottoman Empire in the Siege of Malta (1565).
1887		Constitution of 1887 provides that four members in the Council of members were to represent the clergy, the nobility and landed proprietors, university graduates and the merchants.
1890	31 March	Malta Railway Company Ltd. is declared bankrupt. The Malta Railway is closed.
1892	25 February	The Malta Railway reopens, under government management.
1900		The Malta Railway line is extended to Mtarfa Barracks.

== British Empire Era (until 1964) / Independent Malta (since 1964) ==
Malta gained its independence on 21st September 1964.

=== 20th century ===
Year	Date	Event
1905	23 February	An electric tramway service is introduced in Malta by McCartney, McElroy & Co. Ltd., connecting Valletta, the Three Cities, and Żebbuġ and Ħamrun.
1908	July	Malta Tramways Limited assumes operations of the electric tramway service.
1908	28 December	A tsunami associated with the 1908 Messina earthquake rushed into Marsamxett Harbour and damaged property in Msida.
1912		Dr. Enrico Mizzi, a staunch supporter of the italianità of Malta, proposes in a journal article that Britain could exchange Malta for Eritrea with Italy, on the understanding that Britain would be granted access to Maltese harbours and facilities. The article proposes an Italo-Maltese federation, with elected Maltese representatives in the Italian parliament.
1914		Throughout World War I, especially following the failed invasion of Gallipoli, many casualties are shipped to hospitals in Malta, resuming its role as the Nurse of the Mediterranean. (to 1918)
1917		Dr. Enrico Mizzi is court-martialled for sedition, and sentenced to one year imprisonment. His sentence is subsequently commuted, and a pardon is issued.
1919	7 June	Sette Giugno protests over increases in the price of bread. British soldiers fire on the crowd and kill four Maltese protesters, during a violent riot instigated by students. The protests lead to greater autonomy for the Maltese.
1921	14 April	Constitution of 1921 is promulgated, and it grants autonomy by providing for a bicameral legislature with the power to legislate on all matters not considered "reserved" for colonial interest.
	1 November	The first Legislature is officially opened.
1929	15 December	The Malta Tramway service is terminated.
1930		The 1921 Constitution is suspended.
1930	31 March	The Malta Railway service is terminated.
1934		English and Maltese are declared the official languages of Malta, to the exclusion of Italian which had been the primary language of government, commerce, education and culture in Malta for more than 800 years.
1935		Mussolini's Abyssinian War and intervention on the side of Franco in the Spanish Civil War ends any possibility of reconciliation between Italy and the United Kingdom. (to 1939)
1935		Tension runs high in Malta due to the possibility of Italy entering the war against the allies. (to 1939)
1940		Throughout World War II, Malta plays an important role due to the strategic location of the Grand Harbour at the crossroads of the Axis shipping lanes.
1940	30 May	Dr. Enrico Mizzi, co-leader of the Partito Nazionalista, is arrested and imprisoned in Fort San Salvatore, to secure "the public safety and the Defence of the [Maltese Islands]...in view of the hostile origin or association of Dr. Enrico Mizzi."
1940	10 June	Italy declares war on France and the United Kingdom.
1940	11 June	First air raids on Malta. Malta would go on to endure the heaviest, sustained bombing attack of the War: some 154 days and nights and 6,700 tons of bombs.
1942	February	Governor Dobbie issues a warrant for the deportation, exile and internment in Uganda of 47 Maltese (including Dr. Enrico Mizzi) who were suspected of pro-Italian sentiments. (to 8 March)
1942	9 February	In the Council of Government, Nationalist Party member Sir Ugo Mifsud gives a spirited, juridical rebuttal of Britain's policy of deporting "italo-phile" Maltese subjects; he collapses in the Chamber of Deputies, and dies two days later.
1942	April	The Court of Appeal declares that the deportation to Uganda of "pro-Italian" Maltese subjects was illegal, null, and without effect. The deportees remain in Uganda nonetheless.
1942	7 April	The Royal Opera House, Valletta, is destroyed by Luftwaffe bombers.
1942	9 April	A 200 kg bomb pierces the dome of the Rotunda of Sta. Marija Assunta, Mosta, but skids across the floor without exploding; two other bombs bounce off the roof and fail to explode; 300 people were hearing Mass inside the church at the time.
1942	15 April	The George Cross is awarded to Malta by King George VI, so as to "bear witness to the heroism and devotion of its people".
1942	15 August	With the people of Malta near starvation after two years of virtually constant bombardment, Operation Pedestal brings the "Santa Marija Convoy" to Malta, saving the Islands from a planned surrender to the Axis powers.
1943	6 June	The 21st Engineer Aviation Regiment of the USAAF arrives on Gozo to construct a landing strip at Xewkija in preparation for the Allied invasion of Italy; the airfield is constructed in 18 days.
1943	9 July	(Operation Husky); 2,760 ships and major landing craft converge in a rendezvous near Malta in preparation for the Allied invasion of Sicily, under the command of U.S. General Dwight D. Eisenhower, who was stationed in the Lascaris War Rooms, in Valletta.
1943	8 September	On the national holiday that commemorates the lifting of the Siege of Malta (1565), Italy announces its unconditional surrender to the Allied forces, thus ending the second Siege of Malta (1940).
1943	11 September	Admiral Andrew Browne Cunningham signals to the British Admiralty: "Be pleased to inform Their Lordships that the Italian battle fleet now lies at anchor under the guns of the fortress of Malta."
1943	29 September	The Italian fleet's surrender in Malta is signed by U.S. General Dwight D. Eisenhower and Italian Marshal Pietro Badoglio.
1944		The diocese of Malta is elevated to a Metropolitan See by Pope Pius XII.
1945	30 January	Malta Conference (1945); President Franklin D. Roosevelt of the United States and Prime Minister Winston Churchill of the United Kingdom meet on Malta to plan the final campaign against the Germans with the combined Chiefs of Staff, and to prepare for the Yalta Conference. (to 3 February)
1945	8 March	The Maltese exiles are repatriated from Uganda.
1946		A National Assembly is created.
1947		Restoration of Self-Government.
1947		Malta receives £30 million to assist with post-War reconstruction.
1955	December	A Round Table Conference is held in London, on the future of Malta.
1956	14 February	A referendum is held on the integration of Malta into the United Kingdom: 75% vote 'Yes'; however, the result is deemed to be questionable due to a boycott by 40% of the electorate in response to concerns raised by opposition parties and by the Catholic Church.
1957		Closure of the British naval docks in Grand Harbour has a devastating effect on the Maltese economy, leading to high unemployment at a time when a quarter of the workforce was employed in defence related activities.
1958		Talks between Valletta and Whitehall regarding the integration proposal break down.
1958		The United Kingdom imposes direct colonial rule over Malta.
1959		Malta is granted an Interim Constitution, providing for the creation of an Executive Council.
1961		The State of Malta is created pursuant to the Blood Constitution, which provides for a measure of self-government.
1961		Gozo is granted a local government system. (to 1973)
1964	21 September	Malta is granted independence from the United Kingdom as a Constitutional Monarchy, with Queen Elizabeth II as its Head of State.
1964	21 September	The Duke of Edinburgh represents The Queen at the Independence celebrations, which were held just six months following the birth of Prince Edward.
1964	1 December	Malta joins the United Nations.
1965		Malta joins the Council of Europe.
1970		Malta becomes an Associate member of the European Community.
1971		Capital punishment for murder abolished.
1972		Malta enters into a Military Base Agreement with the United Kingdom and other NATO countries.
1972	16 May	Malta adopts the Maltese pound.
1973		Malta decriminalises homosexuality.
1974	13 December	Malta becomes a Republic, with the last Governor-General, Sir Anthony Mamo, serving as its first President. Malta remains a member of the Commonwealth of Nations.
1975	25 June	Malta withdraws recognition of titles of nobility.
1979	31 March	Freedom Day, Termination of the Military Base Agreement. The Duke of Edinburgh oversees the departure of the last British forces from Malta.
1981	21 December	In the national election, the Malta Labour Party remained in Government notwithstanding the fact that 51% of the electorate voted in favour of the Partit Nazzjonalista. In the wake of this result, the constitution is amended to provide a mechanism whereby the party with a majority of the popular vote would be awarded a sufficient number of additional seats to give it a legislative majority.
1990	16 July	Malta applies to join the European Union.
1993		Local Councils are re-established in Malta.
1996	October	The new Labour government suspends Malta's EU application.
1998	September	The new Nationalist government reactivates Malta's EU application.
2000		Capital punishment abolished from military code of Malta.

=== 21st century ===
Year	Date	Event
2003	8 March	A referendum regarding Malta joining the European Union results in 143,094 votes cast in favour and 123,628 against
2003	16 April	Malta signs accession treaty to the European Union.
2004	1 May	Malta joins the European Union.
2008	1 January	Malta adopts the euro, which replaces the Maltese lira.
2011	28 May	Malta votes in favour of divorce in a referendum. Parliament approved the law on 25 July and the law came into effect on 1 October.
2016	24 October	Worst civil aviation crash of the islands, the 2016 Malta Fairchild Merlin crash, occurred.
2020		The COVID-19 pandemic strikes in Malta.
