= Charles Bonham-Carter =

British Army officer and Governor of Malta (1876–1955)

General Sir Charles Bonham-Carter GCB CMG DSO
- Sir Charles Bonham-Carter
- Born: 25 February 1876; Kensington, London, England
- Died: 21 October 1955 (aged 79); Petersfield, Hampshire, England
- Military career
- Allegiance: United Kingdom
- Branch: British Army
- Service years: 1896–1940
- Rank: General
- Service number: 6465
- Unit: Queen's Own Royal West Kent Regiment
- Commands: Territorial Army (1933–1936); 4th Infantry Division (1931–1933); 129th Infantry Brigade (1921–1924); 2nd Battalion, Royal Dublin Fusiliers (1919–1921)
- Conflicts: Second Boer War; First World War; Second World War
- Awards: Knight Grand Cross of the Order of the Bath; Companion of the Order of St Michael and St George; Companion of the Distinguished Service Order; Mentioned in Despatches; Army Distinguished Service Medal (United States); Legion of Honour (France)
- Other work: Governor of Malta (1936–40)

General Sir Charles Bonham-Carter, GCB, CMG, DSO (25 February 1876 – 21 October 1955) was a British Army officer and later Governor of Malta.

== Early life ==
He was born on 25 February 1876 in Kensington, London, into the prominent British Bonham Carter family, the ninth of eleven children of Henry and Sibella Charlotte Bonham-Carter. His father was a director of an insurance company. He was educated at Clifton College near Bristol and then the Royal Military College, Sandhurst.

== Military career ==
Bonham-Carter was commissioned into the British Army as a second lieutenant in the Queen's Own Royal West Kent Regiment on 29 February 1896, and was promoted to a lieutenant on 10 July 1898. Serving in the 2nd Battalion of his regiment, he was in early 1900 posted to South Africa for active service in the Second Boer War. Together with 1030 officers and men of the battalion, he left Southampton on the SS Bavarian in March 1900, and on arriving in South Africa was part of the 17th Brigade, 8th Division. He took part in operations in the Orange Free State (later Orange River Colony) from April to November 1900, including the battles of Biddulphsberg (29 May 1900) and Wittebergen (July 1900), then transferred to the Cape Colony, South of Orange River, from late 1900. While in South Africa he was promoted to captain on 16 November 1901 and transferred to the Royal Warwickshire Regiment. He attended Staff College, Camberley in 1903.

After serving as a brigade major he went to the British Army Staff College in Camberley and joined the British Expeditionary Force (BEF) to France as a regimental officer. He held a number of staff posts, including that of GSO2 in May 1915, in France and in January 1916 became GSO1 of the 7th Division in place of John Gathorne-Hardy. Between 1917 and 1918 he was Brigadier General Staff (Training) at the General Headquarters, despite opposition he started programmes to train the men in general and vocational subjects. He was appointed a Companion of the Distinguished Service Order and the American Distinguished Service Medal for his work and was mentioned in despatches five times. He was also appointed a Companion of the Order of St Michael and St George and in January 1918 was made a brevet colonel.

After the war Bonham-Carter served in Turkey and India, was promoted to major general in May 1926, and in 1927 became Director of Staff Duties at the War Office. In June 1931 he moved to become General Officer Commanding the 4th Division in Colchester. In October 1933 he was promoted to lieutenant general and became director general of the Territorial Army, taking over from General Sir William Thwaites. He held this position until 1936. He was promoted to general on 12 October 1937.

== Malta ==
In 1936 Bonham-Carter was appointed Governor and Commander in Chief of Malta following the death of General Sir David Campbell. It was a time of political unrest on the island and a constitutional body was formed to find a more representative form of self-government, the earlier constitution having been suspended. The subsequent changes overseen by Bonham-Carter were to create something more representative and acceptable to the population. Although a strong supporter of the need to defend the islands after war was declared in 1939, by October 1940 he had become ill and had to resign his post, effective 11 October 1940.

He was appointed Colonel of The Queen's Own Royal West Kent Regiment in 1936, a post he held until 1946.

== Retirement ==
Bonham-Carter took a number of posts in retirement including chairman of the Royal School, Bath, chairman of the Royal School for Soldier's Daughters in Hampstead. He was also a governor of his old school Clifton College. He died at home in Petersfield, Hampshire, on 21 October 1955.

== Family ==
Bonham-Carter married first, at Drogheda on 22 February 1902, Gladys Beryl Coddington, daughter of Colonel Arthur Blayney Coddington, and they had two sons. Following a divorce in 1909 he married Gabrielle Madge Jeanette Fisher in 1911 and they had a son, Victor Bonham-Carter. His brothers included Sir Edgar Bonham Carter and Sir Maurice Bonham Carter, the latter of whom is the grandfather of actress Helena Bonham Carter.

== Honours ==
- 1917 – Companion of the Distinguished Service Order
- 14 July 1917 – Brevet Colonel Charles Bonham-Carter, DSO, Royal West Kent Regiment given permission to wear the Croix d'Officer of Légion d'honneur awarded by the President of the French Republic for distinguished service rendered during the course of the campaign.
- 1919 – Companions of the Order of St Michael and St George
- 12 July 1919 – Brevet Colonel (temporary Brigadier-General) Charles Bonham-Carter, CMG, DSO, Royal West Kent Regiment is given permission to wear the American Distinguished Service Medal awarded by the President of the United States for distinguished service rendered during the course of the campaign.
- 1926 Birthday Honours - Companion of the Order of the Bath (CB)
- 1941 – Knight Grand Cross of the Order of the Bath

== Memorial ==
There is a memorial to him in St Mary's Church, Buriton.

Military offices
Preceded by Archibald Cameron	GOC 4th Division; 1931–1933	Succeeded by John Brind
Government offices
Preceded by Sir David Campbell	Governor-General of Malta; 1936–1940	Succeeded by Sir William Dobbie
