= List of governors of Malta =

Governor of Malta
- Coat of arms of the governor of Malta
- Style: His Excellency
- Residence: Grandmaster's Palace, Valletta
- Appointer: King/Queen of the United Kingdom
- Precursor: Civil Commissioner of Malta
- Formation: 5 October 1813
- First holder: Sir Thomas Maitland
- Final holder: Sir Maurice Dorman
- Abolished: 21 September 1964
- Succession: Governor-General of Malta

The governor of Malta (Maltese: Gvernatur ta' Malta) was an official who ruled Malta during the British colonial period between 1813 and 1964. This office replaced that of the civil commissioner. Upon the end of British rule and the creation of the State of Malta in 1964, this office was replaced by the governor-general, who represented the British monarch and not the government of the United Kingdom as did the governor. The office of Governor-General was itself abolished in 1974 and replaced by the post of president when Malta became a republic.

== The governor ==
The governor, appointed by the British monarch (on the advice of the prime minister), maintained executive power in Malta throughout British rule. He was head of the executive council and the pre-independence government of Malta.

The governor was the most powerful official in Malta.

The governor was initially supported by a lieutenant-governor. For example, from ca. 1813 to ca. 1820, Major-General Sir William Hutchinson served as lieutenant governor. After the death of the Marquess of Hastings in 1826, the British government decided to downgrade the post of Governor to Lieutenant-Governor, with a reduced allowance. Sir Frederick Ponsonby was formally designated Lieutenant-Governor and Commander of the Malta Garrison.

== List of governors (1801–1964) ==
Name (Birth–Death)	Portrait	Term of office	
Lieutenant-General; Sir Thomas Maitland (1759–1824)		5 October 1813	17 January 1824
General; Francis Rawdon-Hastings, 1st Marquess of Hastings (1754–1826)		22 March 1824	28 November 1826
Major-General; Alexander George Woodford (1782–1870); Acting Governor		28 November 1826	15 February 1827
Major-General; Sir Frederick Ponsonby (1783–1837)		15 February 1827	May 1835; De jure until 30 September 1836
George Cardew (1785–1857); Acting Governor		May 1835	4 July 1836
Colonel; Thomas Evans (1776–1863); Acting Governor		4 July 1836	30 September 1836
Lieutenant-General; Sir Henry Bouverie (1783–1853)		1 October 1836	1843
General; Sir Patrick Stuart (1777–1855)		1843	October 1847
Richard More O'Ferrall (1797–1880)		October 1847	13 May 1851
General; Robert Ellice (1784–1856); Acting Governor		13 May 1851	27 October 1851
Major-General; Sir William Reid (1791–1858)		27 October 1851	1858
Lieutenant-General; Sir John Le Marchant (1803–1874)		1858	15 November 1864
Lieutenant-General; Sir Henry Knight Storks (1811–1874)		15 November 1864	15 May 1867
General; Sir Patrick Grant (1804–1895)		15 May 1867	3 June 1872
General; Sir Charles van Straubenzee (1812–1892)		3 June 1872	13 May 1878
General; Sir Arthur Borton (1814–1893)		10 June 1878	April 1884
General; Sir Lintorn Simmons (1821–1903)		April 1884	28 September 1888
Lieutenant-General; Sir Henry Torrens (1823–1889)		28 September 1888	1 December 1889
General; Sir Henry Augustus Smyth (1825–1906)		1890	1893
General; Sir Arthur Lyon Fremantle (1835–1901)		1893	6 January 1899
General; Sir Francis Grenfell (The 1st Baron Grenfell from July 1902) (1841–1925)		6 January 1899	1903
General; Sir Charles Clarke, 3rd Baronet, (1839–1932)		1903	1907
General; Sir Henry Grant (1848–1919)		1907	1909
General; Sir Leslie Rundle (1856–1934)		1909	February 1915
Field Marshal; Paul Methuen, 3rd Baron Methuen (1845–1932)		February 1915	May 1919
Field Marshal; Herbert Plumer, 1st Baron Plumer (1857–1932)		1919	1924
General; Sir Walter Congreve (1862–1927)		29 June 1924	28 February 1927
General; Sir John Du Cane (1865–1947)		28 February 1927	1931
General; Sir David Campbell (1869–1936)		June 1931	12 March 1936
General; Sir Charles Bonham-Carter (1876–1955)		12 March 1936	1940
Lieutenant-General; Sir William Dobbie (1879–1964)		April 1940	May 1942
Field Marshal; John Vereker, 6th Viscount Gort (1886–1946)		May 1942	26 September 1944
Lieutenant-General; Sir Edmond Schreiber (1890–1978)		26 September 1944	10 July 1946
Sir Francis Douglas (1889–1980)		10 July 1946	16 September 1949
Sir Gerald Creasy (1897–1983)		16 September 1949	3 August 1954
Major-General; Sir Robert Laycock (1907–1968)		3 August 1954	13 February 1959
Admiral; Sir Guy Grantham (1900–1992)		13 February 1959	2 July 1962
Sir Maurice Dorman (1902–1993)		2 July 1962	21 September 1964

== Lieutenant governors of Malta ==
Public Secretary

- Arthur Baynes 1801
- Alexander Macauley 1801
- Samuel Taylor Coleridge 1804–1805
- E. F. Chapman 1805
- Rev. Francis Laing 1811–1813

Chief Secretary

- Rev. Francis Laing 1813–1815
- Alexander Wood 1815–1817
- Richard Plasket 1817–1824
- Colonel Sir Frederick Hankey 1824–1837
- Sir Hector Greig 1837–1847
- Henry Lushington 1847–1855
- Sir Victor Houlton 1855–1883
- Sir Walter Hely-Hutchinson 1883–1884

Lieutenant Governor

- Sir Walter Hely-Hutchinson 1884–1889 (as Lieutenant Governor)
- Sir Gerald Strickland 1889–1902 (as Chief Secretary)
- Sir Edward Merewether 1902–1910 (as Lieutenant Governor and Chief Secretary)

Chief Secretary

- Major John Clauson 1911–1914
- Horace Byatt 1914–1916
- Sir William C. F. Robertson 1917–1925
- Sir Thomas Alexander Vans Best 1925–1930
- Sir Harry Luke 1930–1938
- John Adams Hunter 1938–1940
- Sir Edward St. John Jackson 1940–1943
- Sir David Campbell 1943–1952
- Trafford Smith 1952–1959
- Archibald Campbell 1959–1962

== Flag of the governor ==
Flag used from 1813 to 1875

Flag used from 1875 to 1898

Flag used from 1898 to 1943

Flag used from 1943 to 1964

== See also ==
- History of Malta
  - Timeline of Maltese history
- List of Maltese monarchs
- List of heads of state of Malta
- List of prime ministers of Malta
