= List of heads of state of Malta =

This article lists the heads of state of Malta, from independence as the State of Malta in 1964 to present.

From 1964 to 1974, Malta was a Commonwealth realm and its head of state under the Constitution of Malta was the queen of Malta, Elizabeth II – who was also simultaneously the queen of the United Kingdom and the other Commonwealth realms. She was represented in Malta by a governor-general. Malta became a republic within the Commonwealth after constitutional amendments in 1974, and the position of monarch and governor-general were replaced by the president of Malta who is indirectly elected.

== Queen of Malta (1964–1974) ==
The succession to the throne was the same as the succession to the British throne.

No.	Portrait	Monarch (Birth–Death)	Reign			Royal House	Prime Minister
No.	Portrait	Monarch (Birth–Death)	Reign start	Reign end	Duration	Royal House	Prime Minister
1		Queen Elizabeth II (1926–2022)	21 September 1964	13 December 1974	10 years, 83 days	Windsor	Borg Olivier; Mintoff

=== Governors-general of Malta ===
The governor-general of Malta was the representative of the monarch in Malta and exercised most of the powers of the monarch. The governor-general was appointed for an indefinite term, serving at the pleasure of the monarch. After the passage of the Statute of Westminster 1931, the governor-general was appointed solely on the advice of the Cabinet of Malta without the involvement of the British government. In the event of a vacancy the chief justice served as Officer Administering the Government.

Status

Denotes chief justice acting as Officer Administering the Government

No.	Portrait	Governor-General (Birth–Death)	Term of office			Monarch	Prime Minister
No.	Portrait	Governor-General (Birth–Death)	Took office	Left office	Time in office	Monarch	Prime Minister
1		Sir Maurice Dorman (1912–1993)	21 September 1964	22 June 1971	6 years, 274 days	Elizabeth II	Borg Olivier; Mintoff
2		Sir Anthony Mamo (1909–2008)	22 June 1971	5 July 1971	3 years, 174 days	Elizabeth II	Mintoff
2		Sir Anthony Mamo (1909–2008)	5 July 1971	13 December 1974	3 years, 174 days	Elizabeth II	Mintoff

== Presidents of Malta (1974–present) ==
Under the Constitution of Malta as amended in 1974, the position of President of Malta replaced the British monarch as head of state. The position of president is elected by Parliament for a five-year term. As from 1989, the president is traditionally inaugurated on April 4 of the year of the nomination and subsequent election of the president by Parliament, provided the preceding president has not resigned before their term expired. In the event of a vacancy, or for any reason the president is unable to perform the functions conferred upon them by the Constitution, those functions are performed by an acting president (Maltese: Aġent President) appointed by the prime minister, after consultation with the leader of the opposition. If there is no person in Malta so appointed and able to perform those functions, the chief justice serves as acting president.

Political parties

Labour Party (PL)
Nationalist Party (PN)

Other affiliations

Independent

Status

Denotes acting president

No.	Portrait	President (Birth–Death)	Elected	Term of office			Political party	Prime minister
No.	Portrait	President (Birth–Death)	Elected	Took office	Left office	Time in office	Political party	Prime minister
1		Sir Anthony Mamo (1909–2008)	1974	13 December 1974	27 December 1976	2 years, 14 days	Independent	Mintoff
2		Anton Buttigieg (1912–1983)	1976	27 December 1976	27 December 1981	5 years	PL	Mintoff
—		Albert Hyzler (1916–1993)	—	27 December 1981	15 February 1982	50 days	PL	Mintoff
3		Agatha Barbara (1923–2002)	1982	15 February 1982	15 February 1987	5 years	PL	Mintoff; Mifsud Bonnici
—		Paul Xuereb (1923–1994)	—	15 February 1987	4 April 1989	2 years, 48 days	PL	Mifsud Bonnici; Fenech Adami
4		Ċensu Tabone (1913–2012)	1989	4 April 1989	4 April 1994	5 years	PN	Fenech Adami
5		Ugo Mifsud Bonnici (born 1932)	1994	4 April 1994	4 April 1999	5 years	PN	Fenech Adami; Sant; Fenech Adami
6		Guido de Marco (1931–2010)	1999	4 April 1999	4 April 2004	5 years	PN	Fenech Adami; Gonzi
7		Eddie Fenech Adami (born 1934)	2004	4 April 2004	4 April 2009	5 years	PN	Gonzi
8		George Abela (born 1948)	2009	4 April 2009	4 April 2014	5 years	PL	Gonzi; Muscat
9		Marie-Louise Coleiro Preca (born 1958)	2014	4 April 2014	4 April 2019	5 years	PL	Muscat
10		George Vella (born 1942)	2019	4 April 2019	4 April 2024	5 years	PL	Muscat; Abela
11		Myriam Spiteri Debono (born 1952)	2024	4 April 2024	Incumbent (Term ends on 4 April 2029)	2 years, 175 days	PL	Abela

== Standards ==
Royal standard

Governor-General's standard

Presidential standard

== See also ==
- History of Malta
  - Timeline of Maltese history
- List of Maltese monarchs
- List of governors of Malta
- List of prime ministers of Malta
