= Gonsalvo Monroy =

Count of Malta in the 15th century

- Count of Malta
- Feudalism: 1421–1427
- Predecessor: Antonio de Cardona
- Successor: Alfonso V of Aragon
- Died: 1428
- Spouse: Lady Constance de Monroy
- Occupation: Feudal lord

Gonsalvo Monroy was an Aragonese nobleman that served as Count of Malta between 1421 and 1427.

Monroy served as a feudal lord of Malta, and was unpopular due to various heavy taxes being introduced. This may have been one of the causes for the Maltese population living in poverty during this period. The population of Gozo revolted in 1425, with the peak being reached in 1426, when the Maltese ransacked Monroy's residence in Mdina, and blocked the Castrum Maris in Birgu (where Monroy's wife, Donna Costanza, was). The Maltese people were ready to buy out the land from Monroy, and a deal was struck between Gonsalvo Monroy's administration and a Maltese nobleman, Antonio Inguanez, who offered his two sons in exchange of Lady Constance of Monroy. The sum to be paid was 30,000 florins, which however was still a hefty sum. The local population never managed to settle their debt, and Monroy relieved the debt in his will.
