= Governor-General of Malta =

Representative of the monarch

- Coat of arms of the governor-general

- Flag of the governor-general

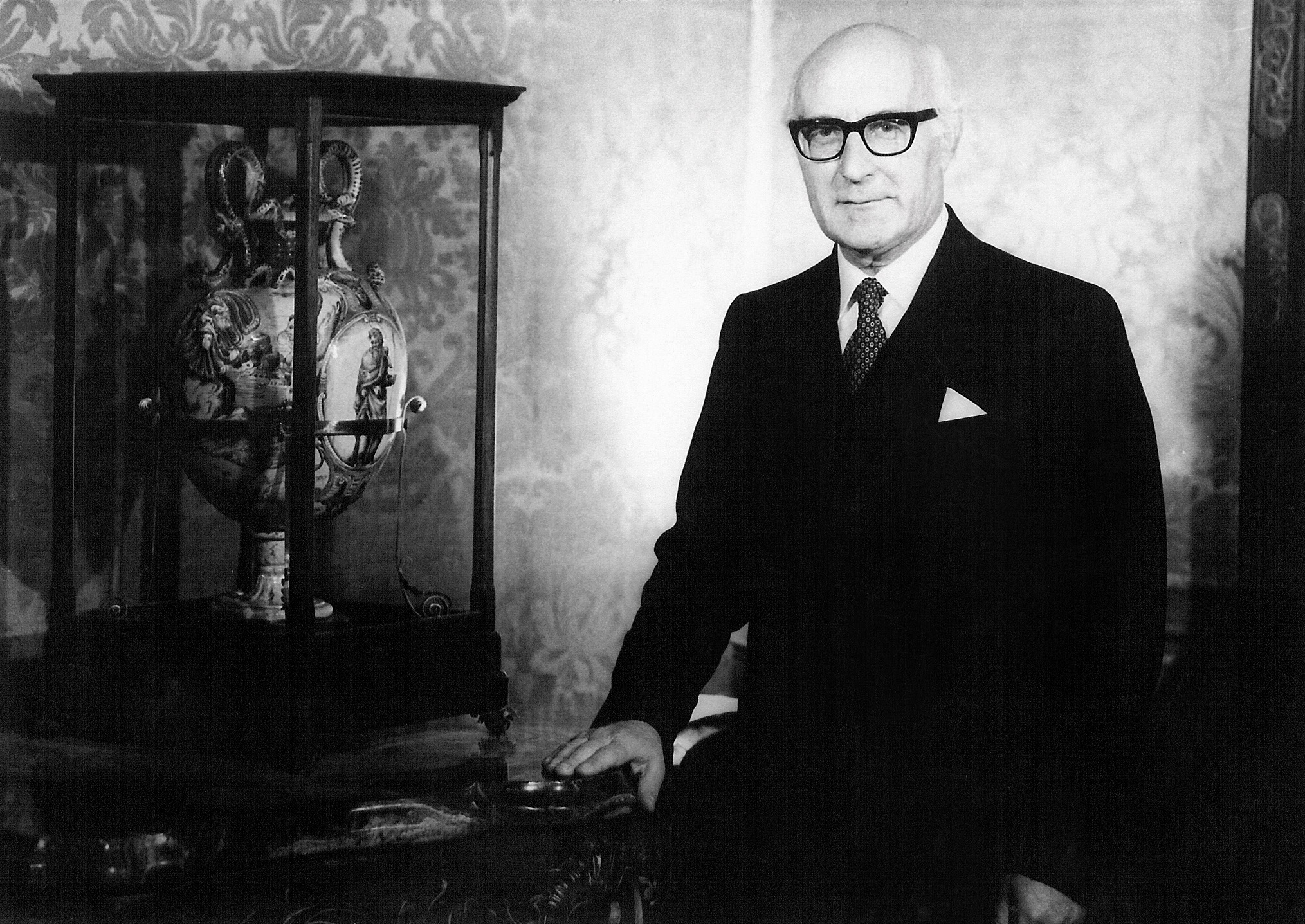
- Sir Anthony Mamo
- Style: His Excellency
- Residence: San Anton Palace
- Appointer: Monarch of Malta
- Precursor: Governor of Malta
- Formation: 21 September 1964
- First holder: Sir Maurice Dorman
- Final holder: Sir Anthony Mamo
- Abolished: 13 December 1974

The governor-general of Malta (Maltese: Gvernatur-Ġenerali ta' Malta) was the official representative of Elizabeth II, Queen of Malta, in the State of Malta from 1964 to 1974. This office replaced that of the governor, and it was replaced by that of president upon the proclamation of the Republic of Malta on 13 December 1974.

== List of governors-general (1964–1974) ==
The governor-general of Malta was the representative of the monarch in Malta and exercised most of the powers of the monarch. The governor-general was appointed for an indefinite term, serving at the pleasure of the monarch. The governor-general was appointed solely on the advice of the Cabinet of Malta without the involvement of the British government. In the event of a vacancy, the chief justice served as the officer administering the government.

Status

Denotes chief justice acting as the officer administering the government

No.	Portrait	Governor-general (Birth–Death)	Term of office			Monarch	Prime minister
No.	Portrait	Governor-general (Birth–Death)	Took office	Left office	Time in office	Monarch	Prime minister
1		Sir Maurice Dorman (1912–1993)	21 September 1964	22 June 1971	6 years, 274 days	Elizabeth II	Borg Olivier Mintoff
2		Anthony Mamo (1909–2008)	22 June 1971	5 July 1971	3 years, 174 days	Elizabeth II	Mintoff
2		Anthony Mamo (1909–2008)	5 July 1971	13 December 1974	3 years, 174 days	Elizabeth II	Mintoff

== See also ==
- List of governors of Malta
- List of presidents of Malta
- List of prime ministers of Malta
- Lists of incumbents
