= Willaston School =

School in Nantwich, England

Coordinates: 53.0650°N 2.5072°W

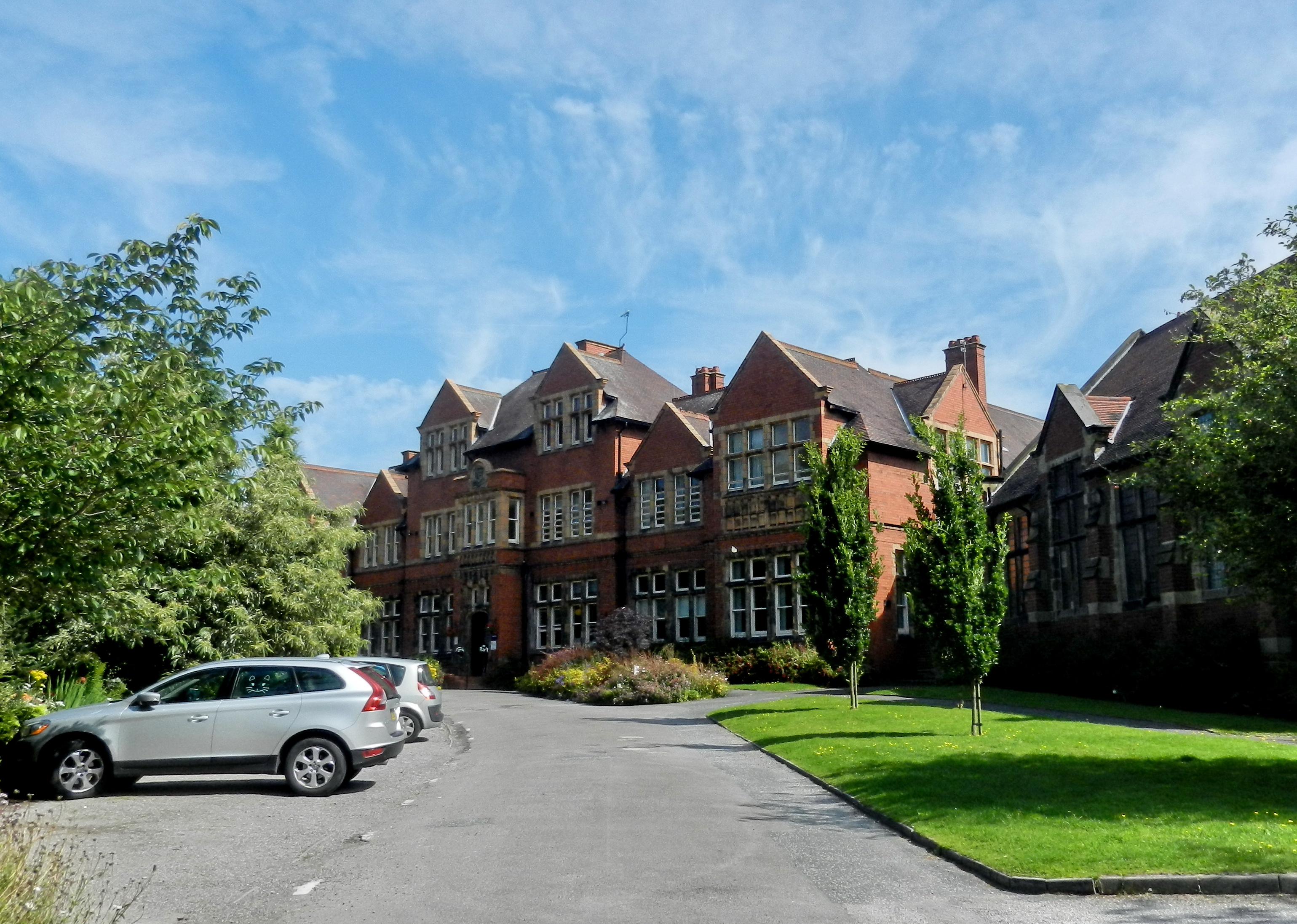
Willaston School, later Elim Bible College, in 2011

Willaston School was an educational establishment in Nantwich set up to educate the sons of impoverished Unitarian ministers. The building is currently used as accommodation for students at Reaseheath College.

Philip Barker came from a family of tanners, living at the Grove, Nantwich. In 1894 he gave provision in his will for Willaston School, which was built next to the Grove. Barker's former home became the headmaster's residence. A local MP John Brunner laid the foundation stone in 1899. The school opened in 1900 with 22 pupils, primarily drawn from Unitarian families.

== Prominent pupils ==
Willaston School had a number of prominent pupils:

- Brian Freeston, colonial governor
- Robert de Zouche Hall, colonial governor
- Alan Sterling Parkes, scientist and Fellow of the Royal Society.
- Norman Ebbutt, foreign correspondent of The Times
- William Mellor founding member of the Communist Party of Great Britain, and editor of The Daily Herald
