= Count of Malta =

Feudal title in the Kingdom of Sicily

The County of Malta was a feudal lordship of the Kingdom of Sicily, relating to the islands of Malta and Gozo. Malta was essentially a fief within the kingdom, with the title given by Tancred of Sicily the Norman king of Sicily to Margaritus of Brindisi in 1192 who earned acclaim as the Grand Admiral of Sicily. Afterwards the fiefdom was passed from nobleman to nobleman remaining as a family possession in a few instances. It was used mainly as a bargaining tool in Sicilian politics leading to a rather turbulent history. The fiefdom was elevated to a Marquisate in 1392 and either title was no longer used after 1429.

== Early period ==
The first Count of Malta was Margaritus of Brindisi, a sailor of Greek descent or origin from the city of Brindisi (Southern Italy). He was granted the fief by Tancred of Lecce, then King of Sicily, for his service as admiral for the Kingdom, known at the time as ammiratus ammiratorum. The title was granted in 1192, perhaps for his unexpected success in capturing Empress Constance the contender for Sicilian crown against Tancred. In 1194, Margaritus then lost his fiefs, including Malta, when Henry VI, Holy Roman Emperor, husband of Constance, took control of the Kingdom of Sicily by military invasion.

In 1197, on the death of Henry VI, the title was given to Guglielmo Grasso, a Genoese pirate. He was one of many North Italian and German warlords who had great interests in the new territory that was now open to them. Some accounts indicate that he was also admiral to the King of Sicily. It is also attested that he was a conspirator along with Markward von Annweiler, in an attempt to remove the young Frederick II from the throne. He was therefore in conflict with the crown. It is also attested that he was a corsair first and foremost, with the population of Malta rising up against him by 1198 on various issues.

== Genoese period ==
Henry, Count of Malta inherited the fief from Guglielmo Grasso in 1203, apparently because he was his son-in-law and the latter had no sons. He used the islands in his exploits throughout the Mediterranean, in his enterprise as a major corsair. It seems that he was employed in pirating activities against mainly Venetian and Arab vessels, but also seems to have been active in internal strife in Sicily. At around 1218 though, he was also elevated to the rank of Admiral for the King of Sicily. It seems that at around 1221 he may have lost the fief due to dispute with the crown. Whether he regained it or not is not known.

Afterwards the title and fief were regained by his son Niccolò de Malta in 1232. Throughout the period during which he used the title (1232–1266), there seem to be present in Malta a number of royal governors. They included Paulino de Malta (1239–1240) and Gililberto Abbate (1240-?). During the period of Abbate's term in office, there was written one of the most well known and important documents from the time: the report of Giliberto Abbate.,

It seems that Niccolò lost the fief in 1266, when the Kingdom of Sicily was conquered by Charles I of Anjou. The title was than re-instated to him, even though he held nominal power. Apparently it was in this period that the local nobility started to form, which is attested by a number of petitions sent to the crown. These petitions were sent by a number of distinct locals on matters of local significance.

In 1282, during the Sicilian Vespers uprising, it appears that the island was easily taken over by the Crown of Aragon, with local aid. Aragonese control initially excluded the Castrum Maris, which did not fall until 1283, following after the naval Battle of Malta. It was therefore in 1282 that Andreolo da Genova was given the title of Count of Malta. He and his family had supported the native rebels in aiding the Aragonese claimants to the Sicilian throne.

In 1300, Roger of Lauria was given the title of Count of Malta by the Kingdom of Naples, after loss of support in the King of Sicily's fleet . He had allied himself with the Angevin crown. It seems though that he never had control over the islands. They were still strictly Aragonese possessions following the Battle of Malta, which he himself had won for the Aragonese crown.

== Aragonese Sicily ==
The heir apparent of the fief was Guglielmo de Malta, nephew of Count Andreolo. Guglielmo died in 1299, leaving all possessions to his daughter Lukina. It appears that during the period between 1300 and 1320, no Count of Malta held the fief. Lukina held on to the rights she had inherited from her father, without actually holding any title or power. The most important positions were filled by natives and people appointed by the Crown.

At around 1320, Frederick III of Sicily granted the title to William II, Duke of Athens. William was Frederick's son by Eleanor of Anjou. In 1330, William invested the county of Malta to his half-brother Alfonso Fadrique.

Although no records are known to substantiate the traditional narrative, it is maintained that Alfonso held the fief until his death in 1349. At this date the fief was inherited by his son Peter Fadrique. In 1350, Louis, King of Sicily incorporated the islands to the royal domain, apparently after petitioning from the local nobility. During this period, Joanna I of Naples appointed Niccolò Acciaioli as Count of Malta. Acciaioli claimed the title until 1360.

In 1360, Frederick the Simple granted the fief to Guido Ventimiglia. By 1366, the fief was passed by the crown to Manfredi Chiaramonte. In 1370, Frederick the Simple entrusted the fief to his illegitimate son, Guglielmo d’Aragona. Manfredi Chiaramonte served as Admiral for the King of Sicily, Captain of Djerba and the Kerkenna Islands, and Count of Modica. He regained control of the County following the death of Frederick in 1377.

For much of this period, the County was de facto under the control of Giacomo de Pellegrino. Giacomo was a Messinese man who had settled in Malta. From 1356 to 1372, he held various titles and administrative positions. He also owned a lucrative cotton cloth warehouse, along with a privateering business. Giacomo took over political control of the fiefdom. He was finally removed from power following an invasion of Malta from an allied force of the Genoese and Sicilian navies. There was a 2-month siege of Mdina by both these forces and Maltese rebels. The Maltese rebels included both peasants and noblemen. Giacomo's power in local politics and administration made him many enemies on the islands. He was also considered a political enemy to the Sicilian claimants to the county, while his privateering business made him enemies in both Sicily and the Republic of Genoa.

Manfredi Chiaramonte held the fief until his death in 1391. The fief was then inherited by his eldest child Elisabetta Chiaramonte. The actual management of the County was probably undertaken by her brother Andrea Chiaramonte. Andrea Chiaramonte was executed in 1392, having been accused as a major conspirator in the anti-Aragonese unrest during the early reign of Maria, Queen of Sicily.

== Reign of Martin I of Sicily ==
All the territories that were held by the Chiaramonte family were divided by Martin I of Sicily between Guglielmo Raimondo Moncada and the Cabrera Family. During this period, the fief was elevated to a marquisate. Guglielmo Riamondo Moncada was granted the fief, because he was a great-grandson of Lukina de Malta, and a descendant of Henry, Count of Malta.

At this time, the greatest threat to the crown was Artale II Alagona. Artale was a member of the Alagona family, which was a major player in the unrest of 1377–1392. Guglielmo Raimond Moncada ceded the fiefdom back to the crown, so it could be used in negotiations with Artale II Alagona.

In 1393, the fief was transferred to Artale II Alagona. He controlled the fief until 1396, after which King Martin I once again gave the islands back to Guglielmo Riamondo Moncada. Apparently the populations of Malta and Gozo, along with the nobility, were divided on the question on who should be Marquis of Malta. This led to widespread violence throughout both islands, especially after Moncada lost the favour in Sicily. He finally lost Malta in 1397. Artale II Alagona held to the Castrum Maris until 1398.

== From 1398 to 1428 ==
From 1398 to 1420 de facto control of the islands was held by the early Universita, a local government elected by the local nobility to safe guard their rights in the islands and maintain day-to-day management. They maintained the lobby to remain part of the Crown of Aragon, which they were until 1420. Alfonso V of Aragon was in need of both money and support, since he had undertaken several Mediterranean campaigns. Consequently, he granted the islands to Gonsalvo Monroy. The contract of payment was signed, and the payment made through the Viceroy of Sicily, Antonio de Cardona on behalf of Monroy.

This agreement caused great trouble in Malta and Gozo. The islands pledged allegiance to Cardona and not Monroy, following the transfer of jurisdiction to Monroy on the 7 March 1421. Little is known about the period from 1421 to 1425. The rebellion of the Maltese and Gozitan populations of 1425-1428 is well-remembered in Malta, although it was not the first.

The initial violence erupted in Gozo and spilled into Malta by 1426. Control of the islands fell in the hands of the rebelling populations, while Monroy's garrison and wife Lady Constance de Monroy were encircled in the Castrum Maris. The tension remained until 1427 when Alfonso V decided that the Universita could buy the fief if they could pay the fee that Monroy paid in 1421. The fee amounted to 30,000 Aragonese florins over 4 months, an effectively impossible task for both the poor population of the island and the relatively wealthy local nobility. By the end of 1427 they had not collected the money and had to bargain for a new deal. Viceroy Muntayans held onto the worth of 15,000 Aragonese florins in seized Maltese assets in Sicily. Meanwhile 400 uncias were given by Francesco Gatto and Marciano Falco, local noble men. The Universita were to pay 5000 florins within a month, while the remaining 10,000 florins were to be paid by October 1428.

By the end of this deadline, the Universita still had to pay 10,000 florins. This led to a stall in negotiations, until April 1429. By this time, Gonsalvo Monroy was on his deathbed. He decided to pardon the remaining debt of 10,000 florins.

== Post-Monroy period ==
Therefore, the islands were returned to the royal domain by 1429. Whether or not this outcome was positive for the natives is debatable. In this period, the islands faced frequent corsair attacks, chronic poverty, and periodic famines. Afterwards the titles and fief of the Marquisate of Malta were never given to any individual ruler of the islands.

The period of dominion status for Malta and Gozo than came to an end in 1530 when Charles V, Holy Roman Emperor ceded the islands to the Knights Hospitaller. This started the period of Hospitaller Malta (1530–1798). The leaders of the Hospitallers agreed to pay tribute to the Viceroy of Sicily, but they were not given the title of Count or Marquise of Malta, ending the existence of the County.

== List of counts of Malta ==
- Roger I of Sicily (1091–1101), conqueror of Malta, Sicilian domain
- Simon of Sicily, count of Malta (1101–1105)
- Roger II of Sicily (1105–1154)
- William I of Sicily (1154–1166)
- William II of Sicily (1166–1189)
- Tancred of Sicily (1189–1192)
- Margaritus of Brindisi (1192–1194)
- Guglielmo Grasso (c.1197-1203)
- Enrico "Pescatore" (c.1203-1232)
- Nicoloso (c.1232-1266)
- Charles I of Naples (direct rule 1266–1282), usurper during the Sicilian vespers; with Nicoloso as claimant (1266–1281)
- Andreolo da Genova (1282–1300), with Roger de Flor as claimant (1285–1296)
- Roger of Lauria (1300–1305)
- Lukina de Malta and her husband Guglielmo Raimondo I (1305–1320)
- Guglielmo II (c.1320-1330)
- Alfonso Federigo d'Aragona (c.1330-1349)
- Pietro Federigo d'Aragona (c.1349-1350)
- Louis of Sicily (direct rule 1350–1355)
- Frederick the Simple (direct rule 1355–1360), with Niccolò Acciaioli as claimant (c.1357-1360)
- Guido Ventimiglia (c.1360-1362)
- Frederick the Simple (direct rule 1362–1366)
- Manfredo III Chiaramonte (c.1366-1370)
- Guglielmo III d'Aragona (c.1370-1377)
- Luigi Federigo d'Aragona (1377–1382)
- Manfredo III Chiaramonte (1382–1391)
- Elisabetta Chiaramonte and her brother Andrea Chiaramonte (c.1391-1392)
- Guglielmo Raimondo III Moncada (c.1392-1393)
- Artale II Alagona (c.1393-1396/1398)
- Guglielmo Raimondo III Moncada (c.1396-1397)
- Maria of Sicily (direct rule 1397–1401) with her husband Martin I of Sicily (direct rule by jure uxoris 1397–1409)
- Martin of Aragon (direct rule 1409–1410)
- Ferdinand I of Aragon (direct rule 1412–1416)
- Alfonso V of Aragon (direct rule 1416–1420)
- Antonio de Cardona (c.1420-1425)
- Gonsalvo Monroy (c.1426-1428),
- Alfonso V of Aragon (1428–1458)
- John II of Aragon (1458–1479)
- Ferdinand II of Aragon (1479–1516)
- Charles V, Holy Roman Emperor (1516–1530)

== Bibliography ==
- De Lucca Denis, Mdina A history of its urban space and architecture, Said International, 1995.
- Dalli Charles, Malta The Medieval Millennium, Malta's Living Heritage collection, Midsea Books Ltd, 2006.
- Vella Andrew P., Storja ta’ Malta, Vol. 1, Klabb Kotba Maltin, 1974.
