= Anthony Mamo =

President of Malta from 1974 to 1976

His Excellency Sir Anthony Mamo KUOM OBE QC
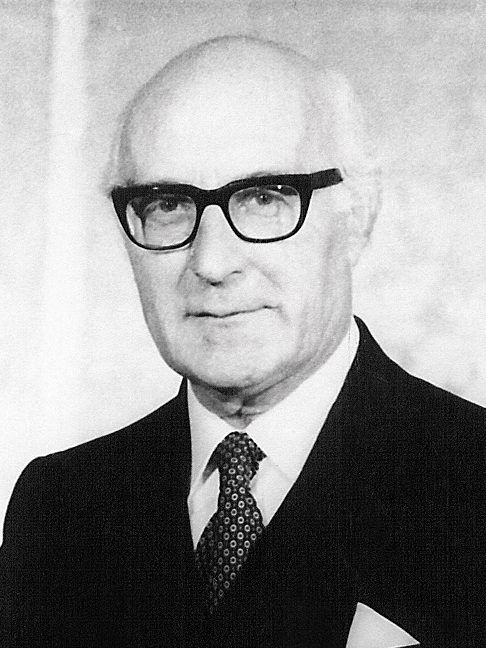

1st President of Malta
- In office 13 December 1974 – 27 December 1976
- Prime Minister: Dom Mintoff
- Preceded by: Elizabeth II as Queen of Malta
- Succeeded by: Anton Buttigieg

2nd Governor-General of Malta
- In office 22 June 1971 – 13 December 1974
- Monarch: Elizabeth II
- Prime Minister: Dom Mintoff
- Preceded by: Maurice Dorman
- Succeeded by: Position abolished (Himself as President of Malta)

Chief Justice of Malta
- In office 1957–1971
- Preceded by: Luigi Camilleri
- Succeeded by: John Cremona

Personal details
- Born: 9 January 1909 Birkirkara, Crown Colony of Malta
- Died: 1 May 2008 (aged 99) Mosta, Malta
- Party: Independent
- Spouse: Margaret Agius (m. 1939; died 2002)
- Children: 3
- Education: University of Malta

Sir Anthony Joseph Mamo (9 January 1909 – 1 May 2008) was the first president of Malta and before that was the last governor-general of the State of Malta before the country became a republic. He was also the first Maltese citizen to be appointed Governor-General, and before independence, was briefly acting governor.

== Biography ==
Mamo was born in the town of Birkirkara on 9 January 1909, the son of Joseph Mamo and Carla Brincat. He was educated at the Archbishop's Seminary and then the University of Malta, where he earned a bachelor's degree in 1931 and a doctor of laws in 1934.

He had been in private practice as an advocate for just over a year when he made the Public Service his career. In October 1936, he was appointed member of the Commission which, under the chairmanship of Judge Harding, was entrusted with the task of preparing a revised edition of all the Laws of Malta. This task took six years to complete. He was in private practice a year before joining the civil service.

In the meantime the Second World War broke out and, although the commission's work was carried on, Mamo, like so many others, gave his services for refugee work and the welfare of those hit by war.

He was Crown Counsel from 1942 and later became attorney general in 1955. From 1943, Mamo was a professor of criminal law at the University of Malta. He was appointed as Chief Justice of Malta in 1957 where he served until 1971 when he was appointed as Governor-General, the first Maltese to hold that office, serving until 13 December 1974, when Malta was proclaimed a republic. He served as president from that date until he was succeeded by Anton Buttigieg on 27 December 1976. He was given knighthood in 1959.

Mamo was married to Margaret (née Agius) from 1939 until her death in 2002. They had three children; Both were given appointments to the Venerable Order of St. John later in life; he as a Knight, and she as a Commander.

Mamo died on 1 May 2008 at the age of 99, at Casa Arkati in Mosta. An oncology center in Mater Dei Hospital was named the Sir Anthony Mamo Oncology Centre.

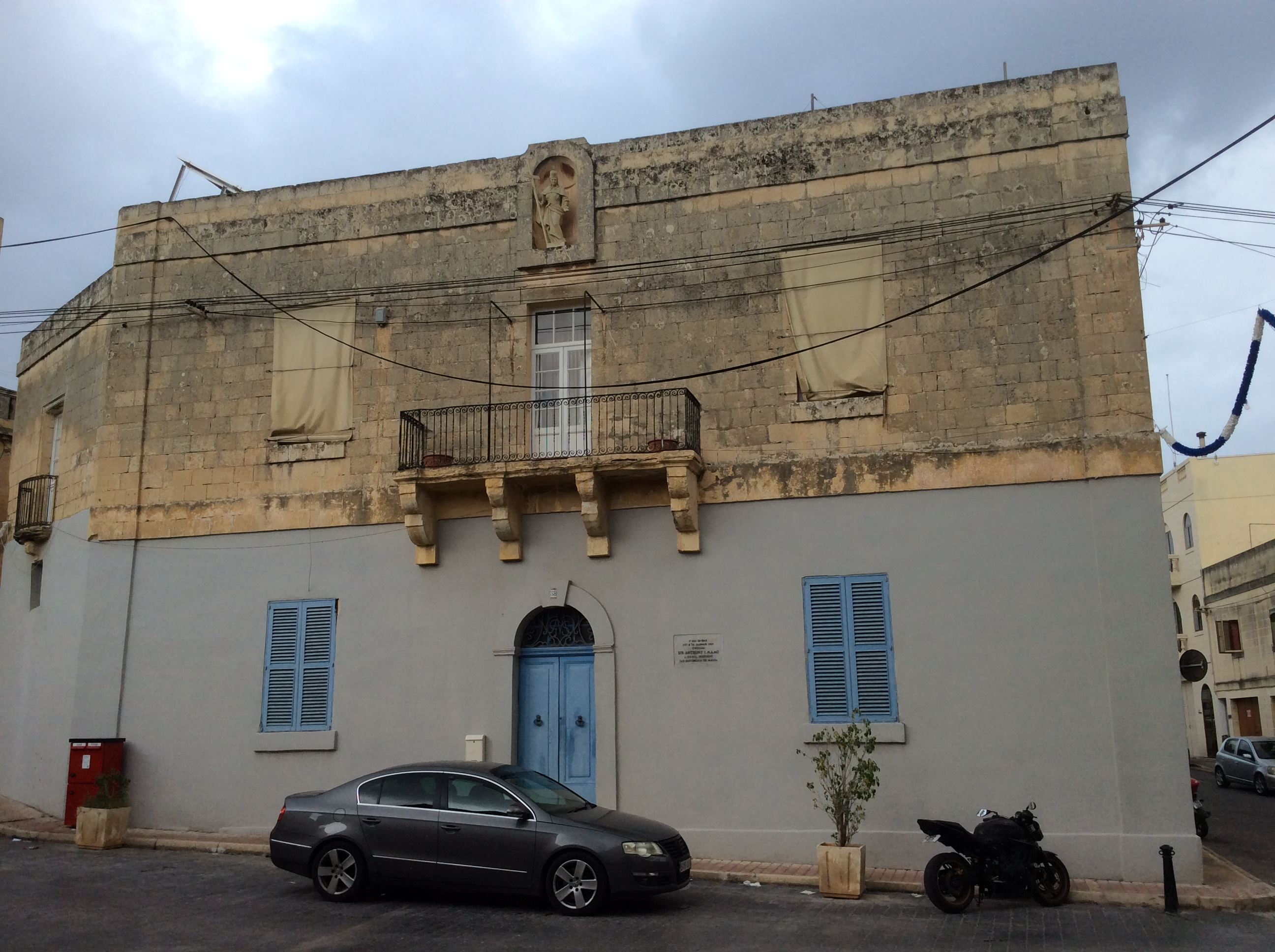
The house Mamo was born in, with a plaque noting the fact

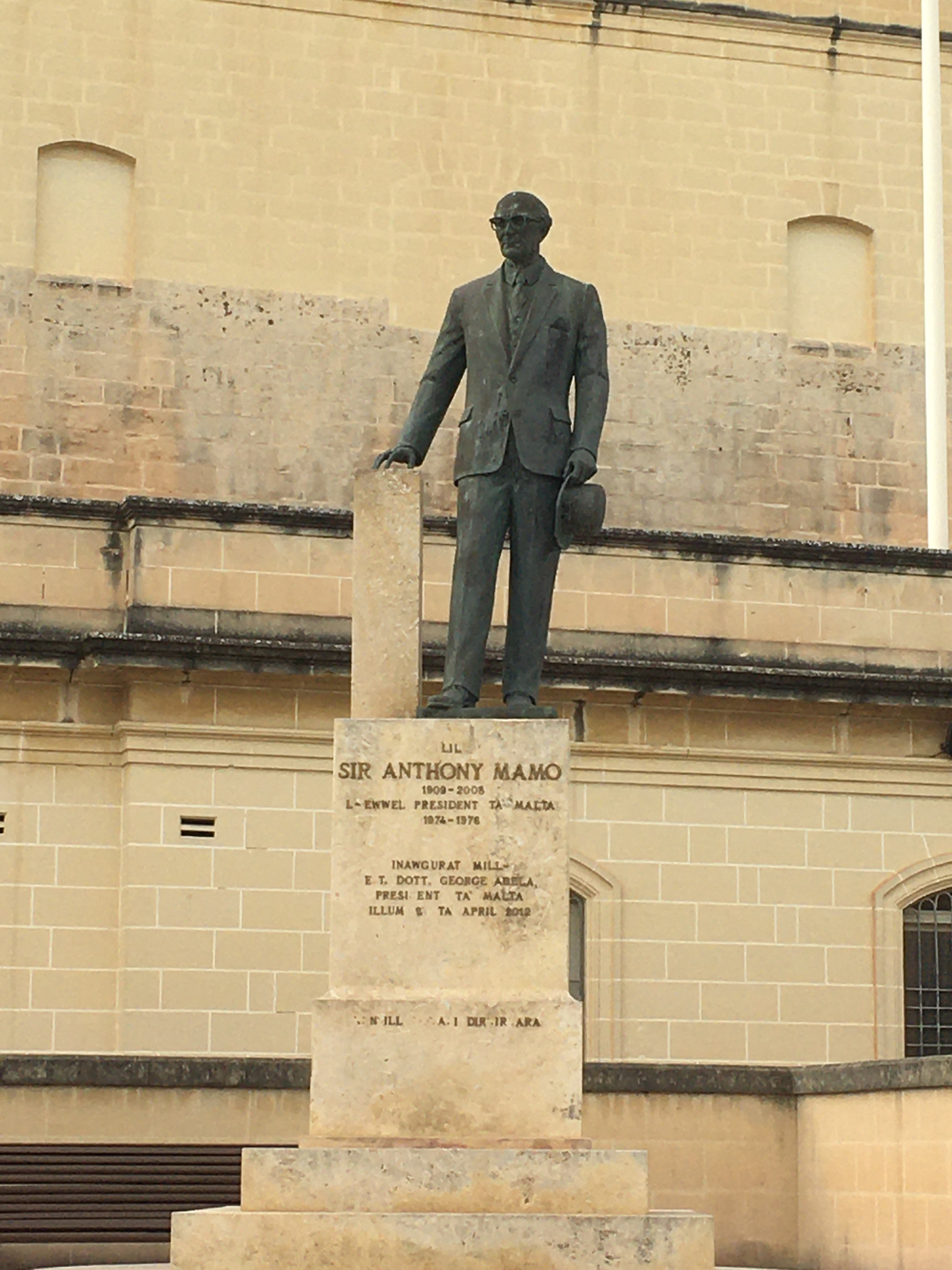
His statue behind St Helen's Basilica, Birkirkara

== Honours ==
- Malta : Companion of Honour of the National Order of Merit (06.04.90) by right as a former President of Malta
- Commonwealth of Nations :
  - Officer of the Order of the British Empire (1955 or 1957),
  - Knight Bachelor (1957 or 1959)

Government offices
Preceded by Sir Maurice Dorman	Governor-General of Malta; 1971–1974	Succeeded by Position abolished
Political offices
Preceded by Elizabeth II (as Queen of Malta)	President of Malta; 1974–1976	Succeeded by Anton Buttigieg
