= David Campbell (British Army officer) =

Governor of Malta (1869–1936)

General Sir David Campbell GCB
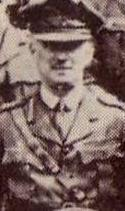
- General Sir David Campbell
- Born: 28 January 1869; County Cork, Ireland
- Died: 12 March 1936 (aged 67)
- Military career
- Allegiance: United Kingdom
- Branch: British Army
- Service years: 1889–1936
- Rank: General
- Nicknames: Soarer; Barbara
- Unit: 9th Queen's Royal Lancers
- Commands: 21st Division; Baluchistan District in India; Aldershot Command
- Conflicts: Second Boer War; First World War
- Awards: Knight Grand Cross of the Order of the Bath

General Sir David Graham Muschet Campbell, GCB (28 January 1869 – 12 March 1936) was a cavalry officer of the British Army, an amateur sportsman, and later Governor of Malta.

After home service in Britain and Ireland his regiment, 9th Queen's Royal Lancers, was posted to South Africa in 1896, and on to India in 1898, though Campbell seems to have spent some of this period in the United Kingdom. The regiment returned to South Africa following the outbreak of the Second Boer War, during which he saw his first action. By the outbreak of the First World War he was in command of the regiment. He led them in two cavalry charges in the first months of the war; the second of these saw him receive multiple wounds, one of them from a lance, making him one of the last British casualties of that weapon. In November 1914 he was promoted to command 6th Cavalry Brigade, then in May 1916 came further promotion to command 21st Division. He retained that command for the rest of the war.

Post-war, he was knighted in 1919, and went on to hold further command and administrative positions in the army. He was general officer commanding (GOC) Baluchistan, 1920–24; military secretary, 1926–27; and GOC Aldershot Command 1927–31, when he argued for the increased mechanisation of the army. He was then appointed Governor of Malta, and died shortly after resigning that office in 1936.

During the early years of his military career, Campbell was also a successful amateur National Hunt jockey, winning a number of major races; foremost amongst these was the Grand National of 1896, on The Soarer, which gave him his nickname in subsequent years (though his divisional staff referred to him as Barbara, for reasons now lost). He continued riding in military meets until the end of his army service. He was also a keen cricketer and polo player.

== Early life and career ==
Campbell was born on 28 January 1869, the son of H. Wooton Campbell, a major in the Queen's Own Cameron Highlanders. He was educated at Clifton College where he was a noted sportsman, in particular playing cricket for the First XI. He then proceeded to Royal Military College, Sandhurst, also representing them at cricket, before he was gazetted a second lieutenant in the 9th Lancers on 15 March 1889. Joining the cavalry was an expensive business. A junior officer's pay was just £95 a year, but the expenses of regimental living—such as mess bills—meant that a private income of at least £500 a year was required, in addition to a similar amount when first commissioned to buy horses, uniform and other equipment. At the time the regiment was based in Manchester, with a detachment at Seaforth Barracks, Liverpool. In April 1890 there was a major reorganisation of British Army cavalry regiments, with the establishment being increased from 488 Other Ranks and 300 horses to 628 OR and 350 horses, followed in August by a further increase to 706 OR and 424 horses. August also saw the regiment move to Ireland, initially to the Curragh, and then Dundalk; due to the reorganisation, the regiment was now seriously understrength, so a recruitment campaign was started. Campbell was promoted lieutenant on 9 December 1890. Cavalry regiments, in addition to their increase in size, also had their structure reorganised, with the main sub-unit becoming the squadron rather than the troop, each squadron being formed by the merger of two troops. The remainder of their time in Ireland was split between the Curragh and Newbridge. In addition to the restructuring, the regiment was issued with new-style equipment in August 1893.

The regiment's tour in Ireland lasted until August 1894 when it was posted to Aldershot; the regimental history describes the period as "one of the most peaceful and undisturbed in that country before or since". Over this time, Campbell had begun to make a name for himself as an amateur jockey, and on 9 March 1894 at the Grand Military Meeting at Sandown Park he won the Maiden Steeplechase on The Soarer, a horse he had acquired on the toss of a coin. Later in the year, on 27 November he won the Middlesex Steeplechase and 28 November he won the Uxbridge Handicap Steeplechase Plate, both at Kempton Park, followed by third in the Handicap Steeplechase back at Sandown Park on 7 December 1894, and back at Kempton Park, another win in the Hampton Steeplechase Handicap on Boxing Day; all these races were also on Soarer. 1895 began rather less successfully, with a fourth on Soarer in the Grand Military Gold Cup at Sandown Park on 8 March, and the next day he failed to finish in the Grand Military Handicap Steeplechase, riding Seaside, which belonged to a fellow 9th Lancers officer. Then on 30 March, at the Liverpool Spring Meeting at Aintree, he won the Champion Steeplechase, again on Soarer. A single day in 1895 also saw him win both the Irish National Hunt Cup (on Dakota) and the Irish Grand Military (on Balbrigan).

== Grand National success ==
1896 was his most successful year in sport. On 3 March he also represented the 9th Lancers at Racquets in the Grand Military Championship Challenge Cup. On 7 March he was fourth in the Grand Military Handicap Steeplechase, according to a contemporary report in The Times, this time riding Nelly Gray, a horse belonging to an officer from the 16th Lancers. However, some later sources, such as his obituary in The Times, state that he won the Grand Military that year, probably based on his own entry in Who's Who. Though he had actually sold Soarer to Hall Walker a few weeks earlier, that was still the horse he rode to his greatest victory, in the Grand National at Aintree on 27 March. The Times the following day described how he "drew to the front two fences from home and won by a length and half". It was at this point that "Soarer" became his own nickname. He also repeated his victory in the Irish National Hunt Cup (this time on Lord Arravale); and in polo, 1896 saw him on the winning side in both the Subalterns' and the Inter-Regimental tournaments, a record still unmatched at his death. In 1897, Campbell tried to repeat his Grand National triumph, once more on Soarer, but he fell on the second lap of the course at the fence after Becher's Brook, breaking his collar bone. He is also reported to have won the Grand Military in 1897 (on Parapluie).

The 9th Lancers had actually been posted to South Africa in August 1896, arriving at Durban in September, before travelling on to Pietermaritzburg and later, the then little known town of Ladysmith. A regimental depot had been established at Canterbury, comprising two officers and 106 Other Ranks; it is not clear if Campbell was one of these officers, or if he availed himself of what the regimental history calls the "large allowance of annual leave" to further his sporting career. The regiment returned to Durban in March 1898 to embark for India. They landed at Bombay (now Mumbai), and travelled from there to a base at Muttra, arriving on 10 October 1898; the remainder of the year was spent in exercises around Delhi and Aligarh. Campbell was promoted captain on 3 May 1899.

== Boer War ==
Campbell married Janet Mary Aikman, daughter of Sir Robert Aikman in Kensington in the quarter ending June 1899, and was still on leave until his recall as the regiment was being mobilised for the Second Boer War in September 1899.

He served with the regiment in South Africa 1899–1900, and was part of the force sent to relieve Kimberley, which was besieged by Boer forces. As such he took part in the battles of Belmont (22 November 1899), Enslin, Modder River (28 November 1899), and Magersfontein (11 December 1899), leading to the relief of Kimberley on 15 February 1900. He was wounded in the subsequent Battle of Paardeberg in late February 1900, and after his recovery took part in the advance on and occupation of Pretoria. For his service in South Africa, he received the brevet rank of major on 22 August 1902.

Following the war, the regiment returned to India and was stationed at Sialkot in the Punjab. Campbell was on 6 September 1902 appointed regimental adjutant, and he was promoted to the substantive rank of major on 16 March 1904. Eight years later, on 15 March 1912, he was promoted to lieutenant-colonel and took command of the regiment.

== First World War ==
In the early days of the First World War he led his regiment, with two squadrons of the 4th Dragoon Guards, in a charge at Elouges on 24 August 1914, during the Battle of Mons "against six battalions of German infantry and six batteries of guns". He later participated in the final "lance on lance" action of the war on 7 September 1914 at Moncel when he led a charge of two troops of B Squadron of his regiment and overthrew a squadron of the 1st Guard Dragoons. In this second charge, Campbell was wounded several times; the medical officer of the 4th Dragoon Guards, Captain Arthur Osburn, found him sprawled in a field of clover and treated him for "a revolver wound in his leg, a lance wound in his shoulder, and a sword wound in his arm". Despite this, Campbell told the doctor "I've just had the best quarter of an hour I've ever had in my life!"

In November 1914 Campbell was promoted to the temporary rank of brigadier general to command the 6th Cavalry Brigade, taking over from Ernest Makins. He was promoted again, to brevet colonel, in February 1915.

He remained in this post until May 1916 when further promotion came his way when he took command of the 21st Division, succeeding Major General Claud Jacob, who later became a field marshal. He retained that command for the rest of the war, becoming "the fifth-longest serving divisional commander in the BEF". His divisional staff, which included Harold Franklyn, a future full general and commander of the 5th Infantry Division during the Second World War, gave him the further nickname of "Barbara", the reason for which is no longer known. He was promoted to major general in January 1917.

== Post-war ==
After the War he became general officer commanding Baluchistan District in India in 1920. He was promoted to lieutenant general on 1 January 1924 and was appointed military secretary in 1926 before becoming general officer commanding-in-chief (GOC-in-C) of Aldershot Command in March 1927, taking over from General Sir Philip Chetwode, later a field marshal.

He was promoted to general in June 1930. After serving on half-pay from June 1931, he went on to be Governor and Commander-in-Chief Malta from 1931 to 1936. His governorship was a stressful time. Political tensions between pro-British and pro-Italian parties on the island led to him dissolving the elected assembly and returning Malta to direct rule, a situation which would last until after the Second World War. One of the houses at Saint Edward's College, a private school for boys founded by the Strickland family in 1929 was named in his honour. The other two were Congreve and Ducane, also named after Governors of Malta. Ill-health forced him to resign in 1936, and he died shortly afterwards, on 12 March 1936.

== Sources ==
- Sheppard, (Major) Eric William OBE MC (1939). The Ninth Queen's Own Royal Lancers 1715–1936. Aldershot: Gale & Pollen, Ltd.
- Holmes, Richard (2005) [2004]. Tommy:the British soldier on the Western Front 1914–1918. London: Harper Perennial. ISBN 0-00-713752-4.

Military offices
Preceded by Claud Jacob	GOC 21st Division; 1916–1919	Post disbanded
Preceded by Sir William Peyton	Military Secretary; 1926–1927	Succeeded by Sir Gerald Boyd
Preceded by Sir Philip Chetwode	GOC-in-C Aldershot Command; 1927–1931	Succeeded by Sir Charles Harington
Government offices
Preceded by Sir John Du Cane	Governor of Malta; 1931–1936	Succeeded by Sir Charles Bonham-Carter
