= Norman Ebbutt =

British journalist

Norman Ebbutt (1894–1968) was a British journalist. In 1925 he was sent to Berlin, where he became chief correspondent for The Times of London. He warned of Nazi warmongering but The Times censored his reports to promote appeasement. He was expelled by the Nazis in August 1937, following accusations of espionage.

== Early life ==
Ebbutt was educated at Willaston School. In 1910, at the age of 16, Ebbutt spent six months teaching English to adults at the School of languages in Duisburg, Germany. The following year he had his first job in journalism, becoming second correspondent in Paris for The Morning Leader (later Daily News and Leader). Before returning to England in 1913, he spent some time in Finland and Russia.

== Times reporter ==
He got a job with The Times in August 1914 but left a few months later to join the R.N.V.S. as temporary Lieutenant for the duration of the first world war, returning to The Times in 1919 to work in the foreign sub editors department. In 1925, he was sent to Berlin, where he became chief correspondent.

During his time in Berlin, Ebbutt became well acquainted with top government officials and counted Chancellor Heinrich Brüning among his friends, and developed a reputation for accurate reporting and intelligent analysis. He was distrustful of Hitler and disliked the Nazis. In April 1933 he wrote in The Times:

It would have been astounding if Herr Hitler had not, in his speeches as Chancellor, professed a peaceful foreign policy... But this does not prove that the underlying spirit of the new Germany is a peaceful one. All evidence available to the observer on the spot indicates that this Germany, in its present mood, is inspired by the determination to recover almost all it has lost and that it has little hope of doing so by peaceful means in the long run... Influential Germans do not see 10 years elapsing before the war they regard as natural or inevitable breaks out in Europe. One may hear five or six years mentioned."

Later journalist and author Douglas Reed described the article as "a masterpiece of careful political forecasting, based on expert knowledge." However, Ebbutt felt his message about the real mood of Germany was not being fully conveyed to the British public, because of The Times and its editor Geoffrey Dawson. Dawson was closely allied with Prime Minister Neville Chamberlain, and pushed hard for the Munich Agreement in 1938. Candid news reports by Ebbutt from Berlin that warned of warmongering were rewritten in London to support the appeasement policy. American William Shirer, a fellow correspondent in Berlin who praised Ebbutt as "by far the best correspondent here", summed up:

The trouble for Ebbutt was that his newspaper, the most esteemed in England, would not publish much of what he reported. The Times in those days was doing its best to appease Hitler and to induce the British government to do likewise. The unpleasant truths that Ebbutt telephones nightly to London from Berlin were often kept out of the great newspaper.

Ebbutt was eventually expelled under a supposed charge of "espionage" in retaliation to the expulsion of three German nationals from England. Ebbutt always denied the charge. Joseph Goebbels, the propaganda minister, sent a warning to all other foreign journalists not to attend his departure at Berlin station, saying that their presence there would be an unfriendly act. Despite these warnings, around fifty people turned up to say goodbye to him, including Shirer, who described Ebbutt as "terribly high-strung, but moved by our sincere...demonstration of farewell."

After only a month back in England, Norman Ebbutt suffered a severe stroke, which ended his career as a journalist. He was 43 years old.

== Later life ==
The stroke took Ebbutt's power of speech and writing, and he recovered only slowly and incompletely, cared for by his second wife, Gladys. They had difficulty supporting themselves on Ebbutt's meagre Times pension, until he received a second pension by the post-war German government as a victim of Nazi persecution.

Ebbutt died at the age of 74 in 1968.
