= Robert de Zouche Hall =

UK colonial governor and historian

Sir Robert de Zouche Hall GCMG KStJ

Governor of Sierra Leone
- In office December 1952 – 1 September 1956
- Monarch: Elizabeth II
- Preceded by: George Beresford-Stooke
- Succeeded by: Maurice Henry Dorman

Personal details
- Born: 27 April 1904 London, England
- Died: 19 March 1995 (aged 90) Gisborne, New Zealand

Sir Robert de Zouche Hall, GCMG (27 April 1904 – 19 March 1995) was an English colonial governor. He served in Sierra Leone and Tanganyika. Robert was born in Liverpool, from parents Arthur William Hall & Beatrice Margaret Hall (née de Zouche).

Hall was educated at Willaston School.

Hall was Governor of Sierra Leone from December 1952 to 1 September 1956. Robert de Zouche Hall reduced the income requirement for women from £100 to £60 per year in order to qualify for the franchise. This dramatically increased the portion of women in the country who were able to vote. A year after leaving office, when Hall was asked if he supported Sierra Leone becoming an independent country he said he did, he also opposed South Africa's policy of Apartheid.

He was appointed Knight Grand Cross of the Order of Saint Michael and Saint George on 1 June 1953 as part of the 1953 Coronation Honours.

When on leave from Tanganyika Hall was involved in the setting up of the Vernacular Architecture Group. After his service in Sierra Leone he retired to Somerset, and became Secretary of the Vernacular Architecture Group from 1959 to 1972 and its President from 1972 to 1973. He compiled and edited the Group's first Bibliography.

In 1973 he moved from the United Kingdom to New Zealand. He settled in Gisborne. From 1975 until 1980, he took charge of building up the historical resources and archives at the Gisborne Museum. He studied the early Pākehā settlement and relationship with the Māori, looking at how land was acquired and developed in the Poverty Bay region.

Robert was buried in Taruheru Cemetery, New Zealand and shares a gravestone with his wife Lady Lorna Dorothy Hall who died in 2006.

Photographs by de Zouche Hall are held and being digitised at The Courtauld, London, UK.

== Works ==
- R de Z Hall (ed). A Bibliography on Vernacular Architecture, David and Charles, 1972.
- Maori Lands in Turanga
- Gisborne Township
- Te Hau Ki Turanga
