= State of Malta =

European country from 1964 to 1974

Coordinates: 35°53′N 14°27′E

State of Malta Stat ta' Malta
- 1964–1974
- Flag Coat of arms
- Motto: Virtute et constantia (Latin) "Strength and persistence"
- Anthem: L-Innu Malti (Maltese) "The Maltese Hymn"
- Location of Malta in dark green
- Capital: Valletta
- Demonym: Maltese
- Government: Unitary parliamentary constitutional monarchy
- Queen
  - 1964–1974: Elizabeth II
- Governor-General
  - 1964–1971: Maurice Henry Dorman
  - 1971–1974: Anthony Mamo
- Prime Minister
  - 1964–1971: George Borg Olivier
  - 1971–1974: Dominic Mintoff
- Legislature: Parliament
- Historical era: Cold War
  - Independence: 21 September 1964
  - Republic: 13 December 1974
- Currency: Sterling (1964–1972); Maltese pound (1972–1974)
Preceded by	Succeeded by
Crown Colony of Malta	Malta

The State of Malta (Maltese: Stat ta’ Malta), commonly known as Malta, existed between 21 September 1964 and 13 December 1974. It is the predecessor to the modern-day Republic of Malta.

The Crown Colony of Malta became independent under the Malta Independence Act 1964 (c. 86) passed by the British Parliament. Under the new Constitution of Malta, approved in a referendum held in May of that year, Queen Elizabeth II became the Queen of Malta. Her constitutional roles were delegated to the governor-general of Malta. Between 1964 and 1974, Elizabeth II visited Malta once, in November 1967.

== Governors-general ==
The following governors-general held office in Malta between 1964 and 1974:

1. Sir Maurice Henry Dorman (21 September 1964 – 4 July 1971)
2. Sir Anthony Mamo (4 July 1971 – 13 December 1974)

== Prime ministers ==
The following held office as prime minister (and head of government) of the State of Malta during this period:

1. Giorgio Borġ Olivier (21 September 1964 – 21 June 1971)
2. Dom Mintoff (21 June 1971 – 22 December 1984)

== Transition to republic ==
On 13 December 1974, following amendments to the Constitution by the Labour government of Dom Mintoff, the monarchy was abolished and Malta became a republic within the Commonwealth with the function of head of state vested in a president appointed by Parliament. The last governor-general, Sir Anthony Mamo, was appointed the first president of Malta.
