= Andrea Chiaramonte =

Representative of the Sicilian nobility

Andrea Chiaramonte (???? – 1 June 1392) was a representative of the Sicilian nobility in the 14th century.

Andrea Chiaramonte was given the County of Modica, which included the municipalities of Modica, Ragusa, Scicli, Pozzallo, Ispica, Chiaramonte Gulfi, Comiso, Giarratana, Monterosso Almo. He was the lord of Caccamo, Castronovo, of the castle of Palma di Montechiaro, and of the castle of Mussomeli. He also inherited the title of Count of Malta and Gozo from his father Manfredi Chiaramonte. He established his court at the Palazzo Steri in Palermo.

Andrea succeeded Manfredi as the seventh count of Modica, and continued the policy of aversion to the Aragonese of Sicily. When Martin I became king of Sicily following his marriage to Maria di Sicilia, he then reconquered the island militarily, the Chiaramontes found themselves together with the Alagonas alone to face the Catalan army of Bernat (or Bernardo) Cabrera.

Andrea, defeated and betrayed, was captured on May 17 along with Manfredo Alagona, and the archbishop of Palermo. He was sentenced to death for the felony of rebellion, and executed by beheading on 1 June 1392 in Palermo in front of the Steri palace.

With him, the Chiaramonte family diminished as their assets were confiscated and divided between Guglielmo Raimondo II Moncada, the Sidoti and Landolina.
