= Guglielmo Grasso =

Genoese Merchant, Pirate, and Admiral

Guglielmo Grasso Count of Malta
- Died: 1201
- Spouse: Cara Campanaria
- Military career
- Allegiance: Kingdom of Sicily
- Service years: 1194-1201
- Rank: Admiral

Guglielmo Grasso, sometimes anglicized William Grassus (Note: His name may be anglicized William Grassus, William Crassus, or William Grasso. In Latin it is Guillelmus Crassus.) (died 1201), was a Genoese merchant, pirate and admiral.

As a trader serving Genoa's leather sector, Grasso was active in the eastern Mediterranean. Around 1192, he turned to piracy in Byzantine waters. A string of high-profile attacks—including the slaughter of three embassies (two Byzantine, one Ayyubid) and unarmed civilians in Rhodes—forced Genoa to disown him. He reappeared in the service of the Emperor Henry VI in the Kingdom of Sicily in 1194 and was rewarded with the County of Malta and the rank of ammiratus (admiral). He lost his county in an uprising in 1198 and briefly returned to Genoa. He was back in Sicily in 1199 taking part in the civil war over the regency for Henry's young heir. After a change of allegiance, he was captured by his former allies and imprisoned in 1200. Genoese efforts to procure his release were rebuffed and he died in prison. Nevertheless, his son-in-law managed to succeed him in Malta.

== Merchant ==
Grasso's origins are obscure. (Note: Karl Hopf identified him with a son of Margaritus and hypothesised that he may have been the same person as the admiral Guglielmo Porco. Both identifications cannot be accepted.) His surname originated as a nickname (meaning "fat") and was very common in Liguria, which has made it difficult to identify him with confidence in the surviving documentation. He was probably born around the middle of the 12th century into a family of the middle class. The earliest reference to him is as a witness to a document of 8 October 1186. He had a daughter who was married to Enrico Pescatore in 1202.

Grasso married Cara Campanaria, as is known from the agreement he made with her mother Richelda and brother Guglielmo concerning her dowry on 17 March 1196. This agreement is preserved in the cartulary of the monastery of San Siro in Genoa. It gives Grasso's birthplace as Nervi, which serves to distinguish him from a contemporary of the same name from Savona. (Note: Cornelio Desimoni mistook the Savonese Guglielmo Grasso for the admiral, thereby giving him a wife named Romana.)

A document of 25 February 1190 shows Grasso involved in the importation of pelts from Ceuta and the Byzantine Empire. In a series of documents between April and September 1191, he is shown with a partner, Gualtiero di Voltri, entering into business with some of the leading Genoese merchants of the day, Oberto de Valdettaro and Guglielmo Rataldo. His business seems to have been the importation of raw pelts for the tanning sector. These interests eventually took him to the eastern Mediterranean, possibly in search of alum.

== Pirate ==
At some point, for reasons unknown, Grasso abandoned commerce for piracy. The most likely explanation is a severe financial reversal. Moreover, relations between the Italian merchants and Byzantium were near a low point after the Byzantine massacre of the Latins in 1182. Whatever the cause, after 1191 Grasso and his fleet preyed on shipping in the Aegean Sea. He was especially active off the coast of Pamphylia and Isauria, but he also made a landing on Rhodes, murdering the unarmed inhabitants and stealing their goods, as recorded by Jacopo da Varazze and Jacopo Doria. One of his lieutenants was Forte, a citizen of Pisa from Bonifacio, a major centre of piracy. The names of two of his other Pisan captains are known, Gerardo Roto and Guido Zaco.

In 1192, emboldened by success, Grasso intercepted a Venetian convoy coming from Ayyubid Egypt with a Byzantine embassy returning with ambassadors from the sultan, Saladin. (Note: This attack has sometimes been connected to the Third Crusade, ongoing at the time, and the fears in the West that Byzantium was in league with Saladin.) After pretending to be in need of food, his men overran the Venetian ships. The Italians on board and their goods, however, were spared. Those of the rest were seized and the ambassadors, both Byzantine and Egyptian, all killed. The gifts intended for the Emperor Isaac II Angelos, valued at 6,675 hyperpers, were also seized. These included, jewels, spices, gold, perfumes, horses, mules and wild animals from Libya for the imperial hunting reserve. Some goods belonging to the emperor's brother, Alexios, were likewise taken. Grasso then seized a vessel coming from Longobardia (southern Italy) carrying a Byzantine embassy. The envoys, including the bishop of Paphos, were killed, although a Pisan knight named Pipino was spared. The total seized in these two raids amounted to 96,000 hyperpers. In response, Isaac wrote official protests to Genoa and Pisa (Note: Isaac's letter to Genoa is dated November 1192.) and ordered the Genoese ships and warehouses in Constantinople plundered. To stop this, the republic agreed to pay damages for Grasso's acts and confirmed that if they ever found him they would turn him over to the empire for punishment. (Note: Genoa also paid a 20,000-hyperper advance on the damages. Two ambassadors, Guglielmo Tornello and Guido Spinola, who had only recently negotiated a treaty with Byzantium returned to Constantinople to negotiate another one. They told the emperor that Grasso had been banished from the city.)

There are no records of Grasso's whereabouts or activities for 1193 through 1195. Possibly he joined his flotilla to that of the pirate Gafforio, who was very active in these years. He reappears in Genoa at the time of his marriage in 1196.

== Admiral ==
Grasso entered the service of the Emperor Henry VI, during the latter's conquest of the kingdom of Sicily in 1194. He remained with Henry even after there was a falling out between the emperor and his Genoese allies. Henry made him admiral of the fleet and count of Malta. He succeeded another Genoese, Margaritus, who was deposed and arrested sometime after December 1194. He witnessed an imperial charter in September 1197 as "count of Malta and of the whole kingdom admiral". (Note: In Latin, comes Malte totius regni ammiratus.)

After the death of the emperor on 28 September 1197, the people of Malta and Gozo rebelled, forcing Grasso to abandon his islands. Henry's successor was the child Frederick II and the regency was held by his widow, Constance, who took back Malta and Gozo into the royal demesne. Although Constance praises the faithfulness of the Maltese and Gozitans in a surviving charter of November 1198, it is more likely that they operated out of hostility "to an unfamiliar feudal lord" than respect for Constance's rights. (Note: Constance's bilingual Latin–Arabic charter has been published and translated. Grasso's name appears in the Latin version, but not the Arabic. Constance marks "how faithfully and constantly [the whole people of the entire island of Malta and of the entire island of Gozo, our loyal Christian and Saracen subjects alike] entered our service against our enemy William Crassus".)

Grasso subsequently returned to Genoa. It was there (Note: Thomas Van Cleve places the meeting in Salerno.) in 1199 that he was met by Henry VI's former seneschal, Markward of Anweiler, who was vying for the Sicilian regency with Pope Innocent III after Constance's death. Grasso participated in Markward's landing at Trapani, which caused Innocent to condemn him as a brigand. (Note: Innocent in a letter to the Sicilian bishops called Grasso non marinus latrunculus, sed latronem.) After Markward's defeat near Monreale in July 1200, Grasso switched sides. Innocent III confirmed his offices and titles (previously revoked by Constance) and granted commercial privileges to Genoa, an indication that Grasso may perhaps have been following queues from the republic. In any case, he does not appear to have actually returned to Malta after 1198.

A few months his defeat, Markward captured Palermo and Grasso became his prisoner. (Note: Enrico Basso has Grasso captured at the fall of Palermo, but Donald Matthew places his imprisonment only after he quarrelled with Markward sometime before September 1202.) Genoa sent a ship bearing the consul Guglielmo Embriaco to procure his release, but Markward refused. Grasso died in prison in 1201. In 1202, the tide turned against Markward and the Sicilian chancellor, Walter of Palearia, confirmed Grasso's titles to his heir, Enrico Pescatore. Enrico was in control of Malta by 1203.
