= Henry, Count of Malta =

Count of Malta

Enrico da Castello (fl. July 1205–1228, died c. 1230), known as the corsair Enrico Pescatore or simply "il Pescatore" (i.e., the fisherman), was a Genoese adventurer, privateer, and pirate active in the Mediterranean at the beginning of the thirteenth century. His real name is said to have been Erico or Arrigo di Castro or del Castello di Candia.

In the corsairies circle known as "il Pescatore" (in English: the Fisherman), was born Enrico da Castello, per historical records considered from Genoa, as a descendant of the da Castello family, of Fulcone di Castello. Henrico became Count of Malta and Malea (in Morea), and Lord of Gozo (in Malta). Son-in-law of Guglielmo Grasso, relative of Alamanno da Costa. Enrico was a Corsair, a descendant of the noble Genoese family of Di Castello. In 1204, the Pisans occupied Syracuse. The Genoese prepare to reconquer the city, which has been granted to them by Emperor Frederick Barbarossa; to this end, they connect with the corsair "il Pescatore", Enrico da Castello. The corsair Pescatore moved forces from Malta, commanding 20 ships and many galleys; he captured near the port 2 large ships (the “Florio” and the “Rosa”) from Ranieri di Manente, who arrived to assist the Pisans. Enrico Pescatore entered the port and besieged Syracuse with ladders and other war machines. After seven days, he gained control of the city with the help of Alamanno da Costa. In July 1205, he arrived in Messina with Guglielmo Porco and Alamanno da Costa's son Benvenuto. Together, they surprise the Pisan Count Benedetto, who was travelling to Palermo in search of reinforcements. In the fighting, more than 70 Pisans died, and the opposing captain was made prisoner. Only Paganello di Porcaria manages to escape. Enrico da Castello, as corsair il Pescatore, gained increasing authority in the court of Palermo, quickly becoming one of the most influential members of the Kingdom of Sicily's government. He eventually settled as Count of Malta.

== Count of Malta, title historical overview ==
The title Count of Malta was created by Tancred of Sicily some years before, for Margaritus of Brindisi, and then was taken over by Emperor Henry VI, Tancred's opponent in Southern Italy and Sicily. Henry’s irregular acquisition of the title is attributed to his relationship as son-in-law to the previous holder, Guglielmo Grasso, Henry VI's and then Emperor Frederick II’s admiral, around 1204.

From 1206, Pescatore took control of large parts of Crete. After the dissolution of the Byzantine Empire by the Fourth Crusade, the island of Crete was initially allotted to Boniface of Montferrat, who soon accepted an offer from Enrico Dandolo and sold his rights to Venice. As Venice was not prepared to enforce its control over the island, Pescatore seized the opportunity and landed on Crete. However, Venice responded by sending troops and Pescatore was pushed out of the island a few years later. The Genoese held onto Chania, and in 1211 his fellow Genoese, Alamanno da Costa, began a campaign against Crete.

He was employed with imperial galleys in the Eastern Mediterranean, in particular in 1225, transporting Isabella II of Jerusalem to marry the Emperor Frederick.

In 1228, Enrico left Brindisi in command of 40 galleys to transport Frederick II, heading to the Holy Land for his crusade, which was not recognised by the state of the Church. The departure from Apulia to Acre is scheduled for Easter. The city's population, incited by supporters of the papal party, chases Frederick II as he heads towards the fleet, throwing filth at him and his men. Later, Enrico followed the Emperor's fleet, who had the task of escorting Queen Isabella II of Jerusalem with his ships from Acre to Brindisi, married by proxy by Frederick II himself, to be able to adorn himself with the title of King of Jerusalem. Around 1230, Enrico da Castello died on a trip to Malta. Peire Vidal, a prominent troubadour, composed some sirventes in his honour during a visit to Sicily.

== Sources ==
- David Abulafia. Henry count of Malta and his Mediterranean activities: 1203-1230, in Italy, Sicily and the Mediterranean, 1100-1400 (1987)
- Basso, Enrico (2015). "Pescatore, Enrico". Dizionario Biografico degli Italiani (in Italian). Vol. 82: Pazzi–Pia. Rome: Istituto dell'Enciclopedia Italiana. ISBN 978-88-12-00032-6.
