= Artale II Alagona =

Italian rebel

Artale Alagona, called Artale II or Artaluccio, was a Sicilian nobleman and rebel, the eldest son of Manfredi Alagona.

Artale resisted the takeover of Sicily by Duke Martin of Montblanc and his son, King Martin I of Sicily. Although he had personal reasons for his opposition, he also had the backing of Pope Boniface IX. The revolt began in Catania before Artale moved his headquarters to Aci. By 1392, all of east central Sicily was in revolt. Expeditionary forces from Aragon were sent against him, but he resisted. On 5 July 1393, the Duke of Montblanc confiscated the county of Malta from Guglielmo Raimondo III Moncada and conferred it on Artale to induce him to make peace. On 24 July, Artale's agents accepted the handover of the island from Moncada's. Artale appointed Orlando di Castro his lieutenant on the islands, but the very next day, 25 July, the duke revoked the grant because Artale had refused to surrender Aci. Artale's agents were in control of Malta in June 1394 and, following further negotiations, his title was confirmed on 31 July. By December, he was in open revolt and the Duke of Montblanc was trying to recover the islands by force.

In 1395, Artale went abroad to seek support from the Republic of Genoa and the Duchy of Milan. Although Giangaleazzo Visconti of Milan, who had been on good terms with Artale's uncle, Artale I d'Alagona, was predisposed to assist him, the plans fell through. He returned to Sicily but was soon forced to flee. He went first to Malta, where he armed some galleys and thence to Gaeta, whence he began launching attacks on the Sicilian coast in early 1396. Having failed to rescue his wife and son trapped in Aci, he made peace with the Martins and was restored to Malta.

Artale rebelled almost immediately. In May 1396, the Duke of Montblanc was trying to recover Malta. In December, he re-granted it to Guglielmo Raimondo Moncada. Artale received assistance from Genoa, which supplied four galleys to bring him to Malta in July 1398. When his fortunes ebbed, he fled to Milan, where Giangaleazzo made him a familiaris of the ducal household. He was appointed podestà of Pavia in 1401 and of Milan in 1402.

== Bibliography ==
- Giunta, Francesco (1960). "Alagona, Artale". Dizionario Biografico degli Italiani (in Italian). Vol. 1: Aaron–Albertucci. Rome: Istituto dell'Enciclopedia Italiana. OCLC 883370.
- Luttrell, Anthony T. (1970). "The House of Aragon and Malta: 1282–1412" (PDF). Journal of the Faculty of Arts: The Royal University of Malta. 4 (2): 156–168.
- Luttrell, Anthony T. (1975). "Approaches to Medieval Malta". In Anthony T. Luttrell (ed.). Medieval Malta: Studies on Malta Before the Knights. British School at Rome. pp. 1–70. ISBN 9780904152029.
