= Maurice Henry Dorman =

British colonial administrator (1912–1993)

Sir Maurice Henry Dorman GCMG GCVO GCStJ DL
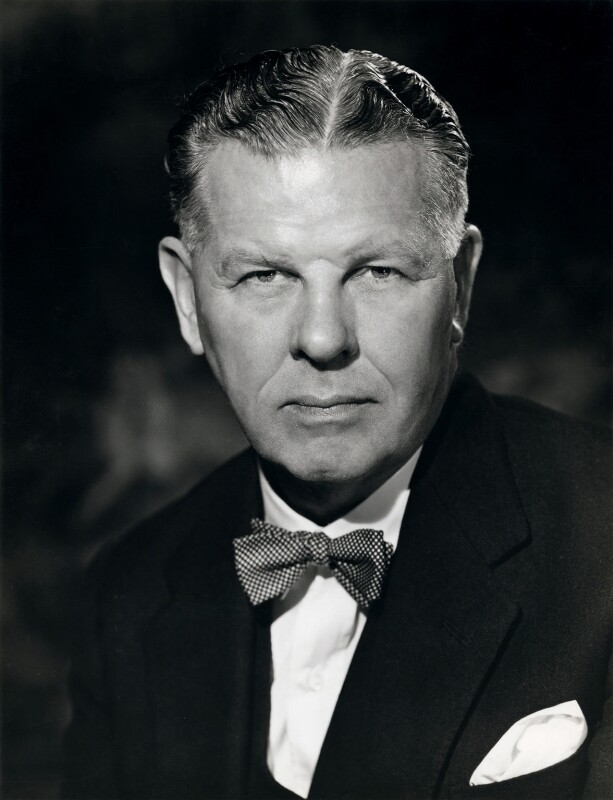

1st Governor-General of Malta
- In office 21 September 1964 – 22 June 1971
- Monarch: Elizabeth II
- Prime Minister: Giorgio Borg Olivier; Dom Mintoff
- Preceded by: Himself (as governor)
- Succeeded by: Sir Anthony Mamo

Governor of Malta
- In office 2 July 1962 – 21 September 1964
- Monarch: Elizabeth II
- Preceded by: Sir Guy Grantham
- Succeeded by: Himself (as governor-general)

1st Governor-General of Sierra Leone
- In office 27 April 1961 – 5 May 1962
- Monarch: Elizabeth II
- Prime Minister: Sir Milton Margai
- Preceded by: Himself (as governor)
- Succeeded by: Sir Henry Josiah Lightfoot Boston

Governor of Sierra Leone
- In office 1 December 1956 – 27 April 1961
- Monarch: Elizabeth II
- Preceded by: Sir Robert de Zouche Hall
- Succeeded by: Himself (as governor-general)

Personal details
- Born: 7 August 1912 Stafford, England
- Died: 26 October 1993 (aged 81)
- Spouse: Monica Dorman
- Children: 4
- Education: Magdalene College, Cambridge
- Occupation: Colonial administrator, diplomat, philanthropist

Sir Maurice Henry Dorman GCMG GCVO GCStJ DL (7 August 1912 – 26 October 1993) was a British colonial administrator and diplomat who governed the Commonwealth Realms of Tanganyika Territory, Trinidad and Tobago, Sierra Leone, and Malta.

== Early life and education ==
Maurice Henry Dorman was born in Stafford, England, on 7 August 1912. He was educated at Magdalene College, Cambridge. He married Monica Smith, with whom he had four children.

== Career ==
In the Tanganyika Territory Dorman was an administrative officer from 1935 to 1940, and Clerk of Councils from 1940 to 1945. He was the assistant to Lieutenant Governor of Malta David Campbell from 1945 to 1947. In Mandatory Palestine he was a Principal Assistant Secretary in 1947. From 1952 to 1956, he was the colonial secretary in Trinidad and Tobago.

In 1954, Dorman was selected as acting governor of Trinidad and Tobago and served until 1956. Dorman was appointed as the colonial governor of the Sierra Leone Colony and Protectorate in 1956, and was retained his position after the independence of Sierra Leone until 7 July 1962. On 21 September 1964, he became the first Governor-General of Malta and held the position until 21 June 1971. Diplomatic relations were established between West Germany and Malta during his tenure on 16 February 1965.

Dorman was a trustee of the Imperial War Museum from 1972 to 1985. He was an almoner in the Order of Saint John from 1972 to 1975. He was appointed as Bailiff Grand Cross of the Most Venerable Order of Saint John in 1978.

== Later life ==
Dorman returned to the United Kingdom after serving on the Pearce Commission and retired from governmental work. He died on 26 October 1993.

== Works cited ==
=== Books ===
- Lentz, Harris, ed. (2014). Heads of States and Governments Since 1945. Routledge. ISBN 9781134264902.

=== News ===
- Beyer, Tanja; Bonnici, Marlene (15 February 2025). "60 years of German-Maltese diplomacy". Times of Malta.
- Grey, Ralph (10 November 1993). "Obituary: Sir Maurice Dorman". The Independent. Archived from the original on 21 June 2025.

Government offices
Preceded by Sir Robert de Zouche Hall	Governor of Sierra Leone; 1956–1961	Succeeded by Independence of Sierra Leone
Preceded by Office created	Governor-General of Sierra Leone; 1961–1962	Succeeded by Henry Josiah Lightfoot Boston
Preceded by Sir Guy Grantham	Governor of Malta; 1962–1964	Succeeded by Independence of Malta
Preceded by Office created	Governor-General of Malta; 1964–1971	Succeeded by Anthony Mamo
