= Queen of Malta =

Elizabeth II's reign in Malta from 1964 to 1974

- Reġina ta' Malta
- Coat of arms of Malta

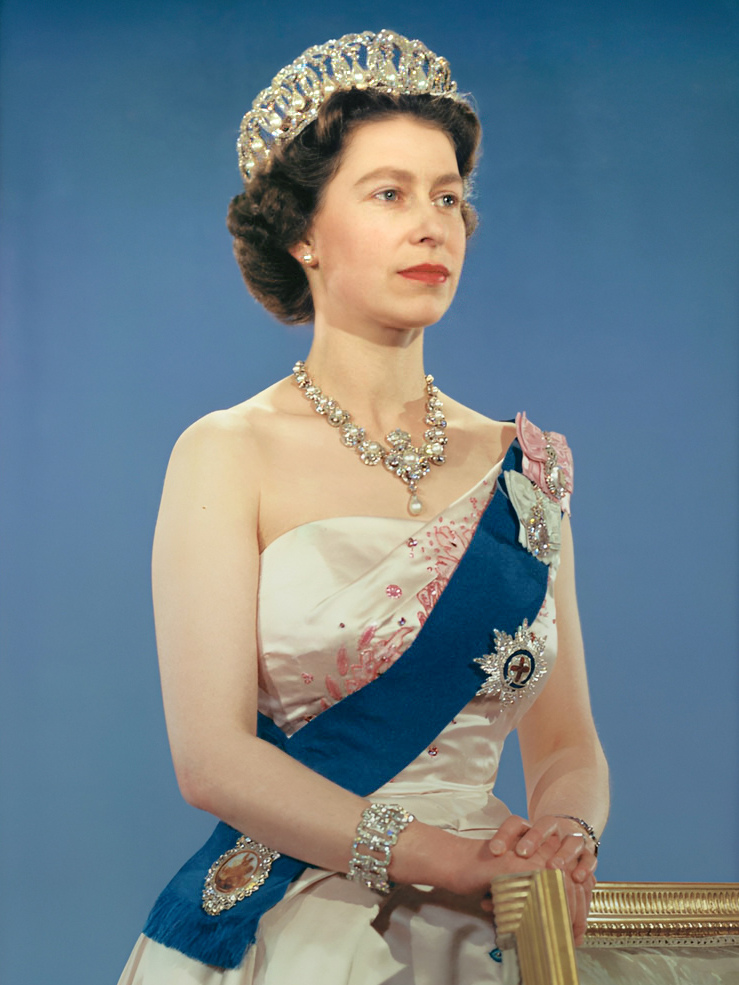
- Elizabeth II

Details
- Style: Her Majesty
- Formed: 21 September 1964
- Abolished: 13 December 1974

Elizabeth II was the only monarch of the State of Malta, which existed from 1964 to 1974. The State of Malta was an independent sovereign state and a constitutional monarchy, which shared a monarch with other Commonwealth realms, including the United Kingdom. Her constitutional duties in Malta were mostly delegated to a Governor-General.

Following an amendment to the Constitution in 1974, the monarchy was abolished, with the country becoming the Republic of Malta, and the Queen being replaced as head of state by a President, although Malta remained in the Commonwealth of Nations.

== History ==
Elizabeth II became Queen of Malta with the passage of the Malta Independence Act 1964 (c. 86). The act transformed the British Crown Colony of Malta into the independent State of Malta. The Queen's executive powers were delegated to and exercised by the Governor-General of Malta.

Elizabeth II remained the head of state of Malta until the amendment of the Constitution of Malta on 13 December 1974, which abolished the monarchy and established the Republic of Malta and the office of President of Malta.

Elizabeth II officially visited the Crown Colony of Malta in 1954 (3–7 May) and the State of Malta in 1967 (14–17 November). She referenced her 1967 visit in her Christmas Broadcast that year, saying: "Today Malta is independent, with the Crown occupying the same position as it does in the other self-governing countries of which I am Queen. This is the opening of a new and challenging chapter for the people of Malta and they are entering it with determination and enthusiasm."

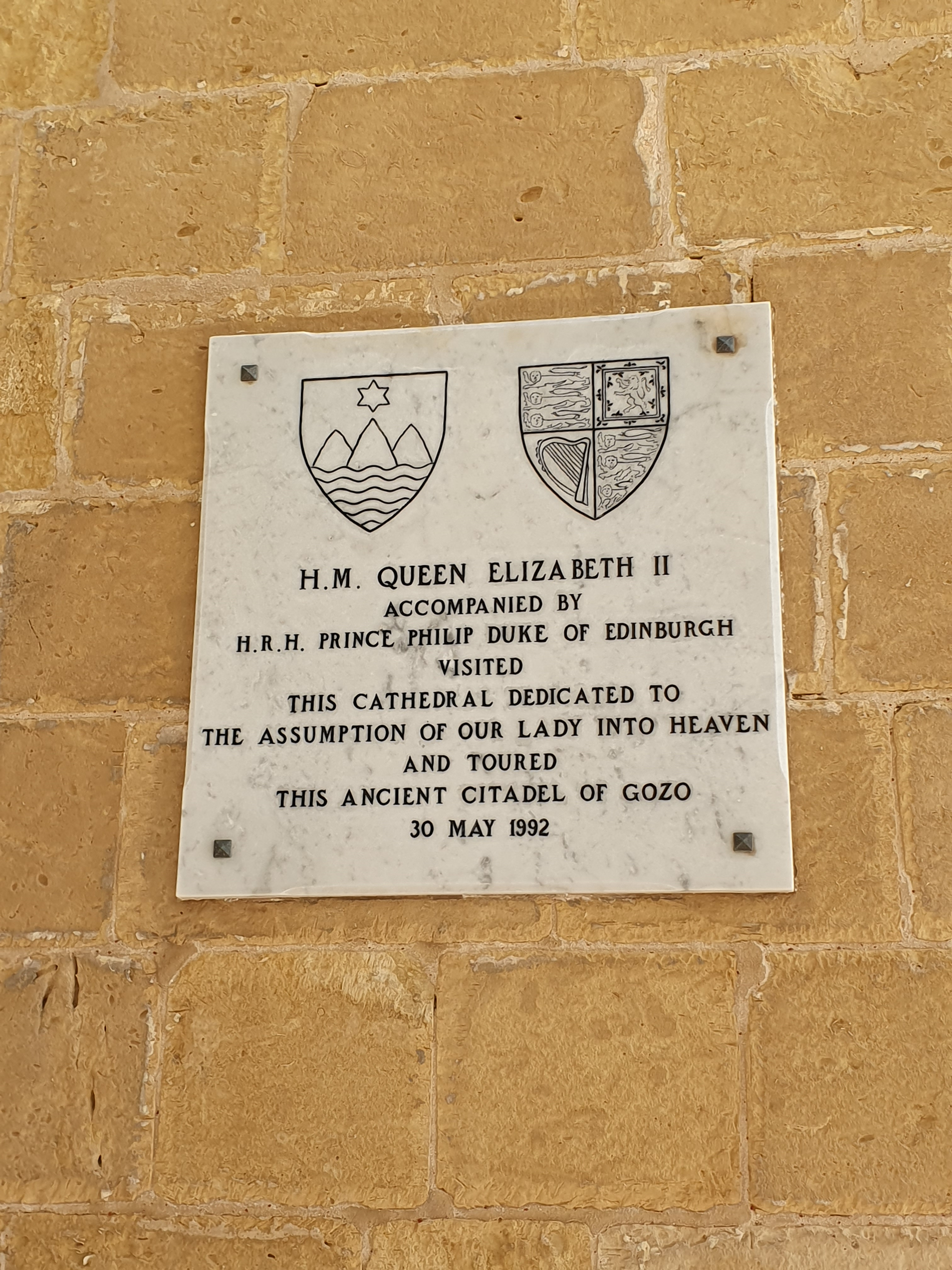
Plaque commemorating Queen's visit in Victoria (Gozo) in 1992

Prior to becoming queen she stayed on the islands four times between 1949 and 1951 to visit her husband, Prince Philip, Duke of Edinburgh, who was stationed in Malta as a serving officer in the Royal Navy.

=== Later visits ===
Elizabeth II visited Malta after it became a republic in 1992 (28–30 May), 2005 (23–26 November), and 2007 (20 November). She attended the 2015 Commonwealth Heads of Government Meeting in Malta on 26–28 November 2015, in her capacity as Head of the Commonwealth.

== Queen's Personal Flag for Malta ==
Elizabeth II had a personal flag for use in Malta, in her role as Queen of Malta. The flag was used by the Queen when she was in Malta in 1967. The Queen's flag consisted of the Coat of arms of Malta in banner form defaced with a blue disc of the letter "E" crowned surrounded by a garland of gold roses defaces the flag, which is taken from the Queen's Personal Flag.

The Queen's Personal Flag in Malta

== Styles ==
Elizabeth II had the following styles in her role as the monarch of Malta:

- 21 September 1964 – 18 January 1965:

In English: Elizabeth the Second, by the Grace of God, of the United Kingdom of Great Britain and Northern Ireland and of Her other Realms and Territories Queen, Head of the Commonwealth, Defender of the Faith
In Maltese: Eliżabetta II, Għall-Grazzja t’Alla tar-Renju Unit tal-Britannja l-Kbira u ta’ l-Irlanda ta’ Fuq u tar-Renji u t-Territorji l-Oħra Tagħha, Reġina, Kap tal-Commonwealth u Difenditriċi tal-Fidi

- 18 January 1965 – 13 December 1974:

In English: Elizabeth the Second, by the Grace of God, Queen of Malta and of Her other Realms and Territories, Head of the Commonwealth
In Maltese: Eliżabetta II, Għall-Grazzja t’Alla, Reġina ta’ Malta u tar-Renji u t-Territorji l-Oħra Tagħha, Kap tal-Commonwealth

== See also ==
- Order of St Michael and St George
