= Antonio de Cardona =

Antonio de Cardona y de Xerica-Aragon (1395 – 1458 in Naples, Italy) Viceroy of Sicily 1419–1421, son of Hugo de Cardona and Beatriz de Xerica y Martinez de Luna,

In 1400, Antonio de Cardona y de Xerica-Aragon married "Leonor Manoel de Vilhena" (born 1380)

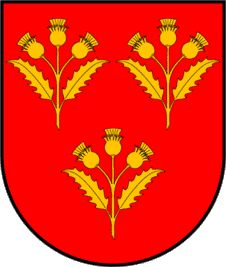
Coat of Arms of the Cardona family

They had:

- Pedro de Cardona (died 1451), 1st Count of Collisano, Knight of the Order of the Golden Fleece, married Elvira Centelles, daughter of Gilberto, had issue;
- Beatrice, married Antonio de Luna Peralta, Count of Caltabellotta;
- Ugo;
- Alfonso, Count of Reggio (died 1452), married Caterina Peralta Ventimiglia, daughter of Giovanni, Count of Burgio, had issue.

After the death of his first wife, he remarried Margherita Peralta Chiaramonte, Countess of Caltabellotta, with whom he had one son:

- Giovanni

== Sources ==
- Treccani
- Geneanet
