= List of Old Wellingtonians =

This is a list of notable Old Wellingtonians, being former pupils of Wellington College in Berkshire, England.

== Politics ==
- Hammad Azhar (1982–), Member of National Assembly of Pakistan, Federal Minister.
- David Blomfield (1934–2016), leader of the Liberal Party group on Richmond upon Thames Council, writer, book editor and local historian
- Michael Blundell (1907–1993), politician and government minister in Kenya
- Crispin Blunt (1960–), Conservative Member of Parliament for the English constituency of Reigate since 1997, and chairman of the Foreign Affairs Select Committee.
- Julian Brazier (1953–), Conservative Member of Parliament for the English constituency of Canterbury from 1987 to 2017 and former government minister
- Lord Campbell of Croy (1921–2005), British Cabinet Minister who served as Secretary of State for Scotland during the whole of Edward Heath's government
- Lord Colnbrook (1922–1996), British Cabinet Minister
- John Dugdale (1905–1963), journalist, Labour Member of Parliament for the English constituency of West Bromwich between 1941 and 1962, and former government minister
- James Malcolm Monteith Erskine (1863–1944), Anti-Waste League, Independent Conservative, and Conservative Member of Parliament for Westminster St George's, 1921–1929
- Christopher Ewart-Biggs (1921–1976), British Ambassador who was assassinated by the IRA
- Lucius Cary, 15th Viscount Falkland (1935–), Politician and former member of the House of Lords
- George Ferguson (1947–), the first elected Mayor of Bristol (2012–16)
- Thomas Galbraith, 2nd Baron Strathclyde (1960–), Former leader of the Conservative Party in the House of Lords
- Sir Edward Garnier (1952–), Conservative Member of Parliament for the English constituency of Harborough since 1992, and former Solicitor General for England and Wales
- Lord Gordon-Walker (1907–1980), British Cabinet Minister who served as Foreign Secretary under Harold Wilson
- Edward Faulks, Baron Faulks (1950–), Conservative Member in the House of Lords
- Sir Alexander Grantham, (1899–1978) British colonial administrator who governed Hong Kong
- Spencer Loch, 4th Baron Loch (1920–1991)
- Richard Luce, Baron Luce (1936–) Governor of Gibraltar and Lord Chamberlain to HM The Queen
- Antony Rivers Marlow (1940–), Conservative Member of Parliament for the English constituency of Northampton North between 1979 and 1997
- Sir Harold Nicolson (1886–1968), British diplomat, author and politician
- Sir Michael Spicer (1943–2019), Conservative Member of Parliament for the English constituencies of West Worcestershire and South Worcestershire between 1974 and 2010 and former chairman of the 1922 Committee
- Edward Stanley, 17th Earl of Derby (1865–1948), British Secretary of State for War (two separate times) and founder of the Lord Derby Cup
- Sir Edmund Stockdale (1903–1989), Lord Mayor of London
- Lord Stodart of Leaston (1916–2003), Scottish Tory politician who served under Sir Alec Douglas-Home and Edward Heath
- Robin Tilbrook (1958–), leader and founder of the English Democrats

== Religion ==
- Richard Harries, Baron Harries of Pentregarth (1936–2026) retired Church of England bishop, the 41st Bishop of Oxford from 1987 to 2006
- David Watson (1933–1984) evangelical Church of England clergyman, evangelist and author

== Royalty and nobility ==
- Victor Frederick William Cavendish-Bentinck, 9th Duke of Portland
- Prince Achileas-Andreas of Greece and Denmark, actor and grandson of Constantine II of Greece
- Prince Constantine Alexios of Greece and Denmark, artist and grandson of Constantine II of Greece
- Princess Maria Olympia of Greece and Denmark, model and granddaughter of Constantine II of Greece
- Prince Alfons of Liechtenstein (born 2001), financial analyst and grandson of Hans-Adam II
- Prince Christian Victor of Schleswig-Holstein
- Prince Francis of Teck

== Sport ==
- Henry Beaumont (1881–1964), cricketer
- Lionel Booth (1850–1912), cricketer
- Frederick Browning (1870–1929) cricketer and rackets amateur champion
- Simon Clarke (1938–2017) England rugby player and first-class cricketer
- Ben Curran (1996–) Northamptonshire Cricketer, brother of Tom and Sam
- Sam Curran (1998–) England and Surrey Cricketer, brother of Tom Curran
- Thomas Curran (1995–) England and Surrey Cricketer, brother of Sam Curran
- Ernest Denny (1872–1949), cricketer
- Paul Doran-Jones (1985–) England International Rugby player
- Sean Edwards (1986–2013) British racing driver
- Max Evans (1983–) Scotland International Rugby player
- Thom Evans (1985–) Scotland International Rugby player
- David Fasken (1932–2006), First-class cricketer
- James Haskell (1985–) England International Rugby player
- Sir Patrick Head (1946–) co-founder of the Williams Formula One team
- Percy Heath (1877–1917), cricketer
- Madison Hughes (1992–) USA International Rugby player
- James Hunt (1947–1993) 1976 F1 World Champion
- Norman Grace (1894–1975), cricketer
- Peter Gracey (1921–2006), cricketer
- Eric Grimley (1899–1969), cricketer
- Max Lahiff (1989–) Rugby union player (Bath Rugby & London Irish)
- Morgan Lake (1997–) Olympic athlete and twice World Junior Athletics Champion
- Henry Lawrence (1848–1902) England international rugby player and captain
- Rear-Admiral Spencer Login, Royal Navy (1851–1909), rugby union international who represented England in 1875
- Murray Wyatt Marshall (1873–1978), England International Rugby player and captain
- Tim Mayer (1966–) US motorsports organizer and official.
- Richard Raphael (1872–1910), cricketer
- Donald Ray (1903–1944), cricketer
- Jamie Salmon (1959–) dual rugby international (New Zealand All Blacks and England)
- James Scott Douglas (1930–1969) Scottish racing driver (and Baronet Douglas)
- Ernest Tomkins (1869–1927), cricketer
- Tom Townsend (1971–) Britain and England international bridge player and writer
- Chris Wakefield (1991–), cricketer
- Geoffrey Warren (1908–1941), cricketer
- Louis Weigall (1873–1957), cricketer
- Hugh Wilson (1972-1976), Surrey & Somerset, England reserve, cricketer
- Maximillian Wood DSO (1873–1915), cricketer
- Richard Worsley (1879–1917), cricketer
- Ed Young (1989–), cricketer
- Peter Young (1986–), cricketer

== Arts and entertainment ==
- John Addison (1920-98) film composer
- Charles Robert Ashbee (1863–1942) one of the prime movers of the English Arts and Crafts movement
- Ellie Bamber (1997–) actress
- Sir Hugh Beaver (1890–1967) founder of the Guinness Book of Records
- James Bernard (1925–2001) film composer and Academy Award winner
- Trevor Blakemore (1879–1953) poet
- Josh Bowman (1988–) star of ABC drama Revenge
- Rory Bremner (1961–) impressionist and comedian, noted for political satire
- Heather Cameron-Hayes semi-finalist of BBC1's The Voice
- Holly Cattle (1997–), actress
- Bob Carlos Clarke (1950–2006) photographer
- Richard Curle (1883–1968) author, critic and journalist
- Henry Danton (1919–2022) ballet dancer Henry Danton
- Caggie Dunlop star of E4 reality series Made in Chelsea
- Elize du Toit (1980–) actress and model best known for the Channel 4 soap opera Hollyoaks
- Hugh Ray Easton (1906-1965) stained glass artist
- Gavin Ewart (1916–1995) poet
- Sebastian Faulks (1953–) novelist whose works include Birdsong and Charlotte Gray
- Jim Field Smith (1979–) film director, writer and comedian
- Nicola Formby (1965– ) journalist
- John Gardner (1917–2011) composer
- John Keane (1954–) painter and official artist, Gulf War
- Sir Christopher Lee (1922–2015) film actor
- John Masters (1914–1983) British Army officer and novelist
- Robert Morley (1908–1992) theatre and film actor
- John Nash (1893–1977) painter and war artist
- Frederick Noad (1929–2001) guitarist, lutenist, author and teacher
- Gregory Norminton (1976–) novelist
- George Orwell (1903–1950) author of Animal Farm and Nineteen Eighty-Four (Easter Term 1917 only; in May 1917 he became a King's Scholar at Eton)
- Nerina Pallot (1974–) singer, songwriter and producer
- Harry Ricketts (1950–) writer and biographer
- Sam Sedgman (1987–), children's author
- Guy Siner (1947–) actor
- Count Nikolai Tolstoy (1935–) Russo-British historian and author
- Martin Windrow (1944–) historian
- Will Young (1979–) singer and actor

== Broadcasting ==
- Daniel Farson (1927–1997) broadcaster and writer
- Gerald Hine-Haycock (1951–) journalist, Correspondent for ITN and BBC News; Presenter for HTV West and BBC West
- Robin Oakley (1941–) journalist, Political Editor of CNN International, formerly Political Editor of the BBC
- Peter Snow (1938–) British television and radio presenter

== Military ==
- Field Marshal Sir Claude Auchinleck, British Army commander during World War II
- Field Marshal Sir Nigel Bagnall, Chief of the General Staff
- Field Marshal Sir Geoffrey Baker, Chief of the General Staff 1968 to 1971
- Brigadier John Bellman MC, Commander, Royal Artillery, Aide-de-Camp to Queen Elizabeth II
- Lieutenant General Sir Noel Beresford-Peirse, General Officer Commanding, XIII Corps and later General Officer Commander-in-Chief, Southern Army, India during the Second World War
- Air Chief Marshal Percy Bernard, 5th Earl of Bandon
- Roger Bushell, Mastermind of the Great Escape
- General Sir Christopher Deverell, Commander of the UK's Joint Forces Command and member of the UK Chiefs of Staff Committee April 2016 to May 2019.
- General Sir James Glover, Commander-in-Chief UK Land Forces 1985 to 1987
- General Sir Roland Guy, Adjutant General to the British Army 1984 to 1986
- Lieutenant Colonel Sir Wolseley Haig (1865–1938) Lieutenant-Colonel
- Blondie Hasler, Royal Marine, Cockleshell hero
- General Sir Peter Hunt, Chief of the General Staff 1973
- General Sir Charles Huxtable, Commander-in-Chief UK Land Forces 1988 to 1990
- Lieutenant General Sir Alistair Irwin, Adjutant General to the British Army 2003 to 2005
- Lieutenant General Sir Maurice Robert Johnston, Assistant Chief of the General Staff, Deputy Chief of the Defence Staff and Lord Lieutenant of Wiltshire
- Lieutenant General Sir Kenneth Loch, Director of Anti-Aircraft and Coastal Defence (1939–1941), Master-General of Ordnance, India (1944–1947), and head of the board of governors at Wellington
- General Sir Richard O'Connor, British Army general during World War II
- Major-General George Erroll Prior-Palmer, General Officer Commanding, 6th Armoured Division
- Sir John Rennie, former Director of the Secret Intelligence Service (MI6)
- General Sir Charles Richardson, Chief Royal Engineer and Master-General of the Ordnance
- Marshal of the Royal Air Force Sir John Salmond, Chief of the Air Staff
- Lieutenant General Sir Montagu Stopford, Commander of British forces during the Battle of Kohima
- Field Marshal Sir Gerald Templer, Chief of the Imperial General Staff
- General Sir Harry Tuzo, General Officer Commanding, Northern Ireland and other senior British Army commands
- Lord George Wellesley, soldier and airman, and great-grandson of the 1st Duke of Wellington
- Major-General Douglas Wimberley, British Divisional Commander in World War II

=== Victoria Cross and George Cross holders ===
Fifteen Old Wellingtonians have won the Victoria Cross; one Old Wellingtonian has won the George Cross. They are as follows:

- Victoria Cross
  - Zulu War
    - Lieutenant Henry Lysons (He later achieved the rank of colonel and was made a Companion of the Order of the Bath (CB)) (1858–1907)
  - South African War (Boer War)
    - Captain Charles FitzClarence (He later achieved the rank of brigadier general. He was killed in action, Polygon Wood, Zonnebeke, Belgium, on 12 November 1914) (1865–1914)
    - Captain Ernest Beachcroft Beckwith Towse (He later became a Knight Commander of the Royal Victorian Order (KCVO), and a Commander of the Order of the British Empire CBE) (1864–1948)
  - Third Ashanti Expedition
    - Captain Charles John Melliss, (later to become Major General Sir Charles John Melliss) (1862–1936)
  - Second Somaliland Expedition
    - Captain Alexander Stanhope Cobbe (He later achieved the rank of general) (1870–1931)
  - First World War
    - Captain John Franks Vallentin (1882–1914)
    - Lieutenant James Anson Otho Brooke VC (1884–1914)
    - Captain John Fitzhardinge Paul Butler (1888–1916)
    - Second Lieutenant Alexander Buller Turner (1893–1915)
    - Lieutenant Thomas Orde Lawder Wilkinson (1894–1916)
  - Second World War
    - Flight Lieutenant Roderick Alastair Brook Learoyd (1913–1996)
    - Commander Anthony Cecil Capel Miers (Later to become Rear Admiral Sir Anthony Cecil Capel Miers) (1906–1985)
    - Captain Patrick Porteous (1918–2000) (he later achieved the rank of colonel)
    - Lieutenant-Colonel Victor Buller Turner (brother of Alexander Buller Turner) (1900–1972)
    - Lieutenant Claud Raymond (1923–1945)
- George Cross
  - 1935 Quetta earthquake
    - Lieutenant John Cowley (Originally awarded the Albert Medal which was converted to the George Cross. He was later to become Lieutenant General Sir John Cowley)

== Other ==
- Joseph Arthur Arkwright, bacteriologist
- John Arnold
- David Boyle, British intelligence officer
- Ranald Boyle, British diplomat
- C.R. Boxer, historian
- W S Bristowe, arachnologist
- Michael Brock, British historian
- Adolphus Cambridge, 1st Marquess of Cambridge, brother of Queen Mary
- Professor Klaus Dodds, Notable Academic and Professor of Geopolitics. Royal Holloway, University of London
- Anthony Fletcher, English historian
- Nicholas Grimshaw, English architect who is behind the Eden Project
- Peter Llewellyn Gwynn-Jones, Garter Principal King of Arms, 1995–2010
- John Haycraft, founder of International House World Organisation
- Michael Knatchbull, 5th Baron Brabourne, British peer and soldier
- Patrick de Maré, psychiatrist
- Alexander Mountbatten, 1st Marquess of Carisbrooke
- Sir Rudolph Peters FRS, biochemist
- Matthew Restall, historian
- Esmond Romilly, socialist, anti-fascist, and journalist
- Richard Skemp, mathematician, psychologist and academic
- John F. C. Turner, architect and theorist

== See also ==
- Category:People educated at Wellington College, Berkshire
