= Wellington College International Shanghai =

Location
- No. 1500 Yao Long Road; Qiantan International Business Zone, Shanghai, 200124; China

Information
- Gender: Co-educational
- Age: 3 years to 18 years
- Houses: Combermere, Hill, Hopetoun, Lynedoch, Stanley, Wellesley, Hardindge, Hill
- Website: https://www.wellingtoncollege.cn/shanghai

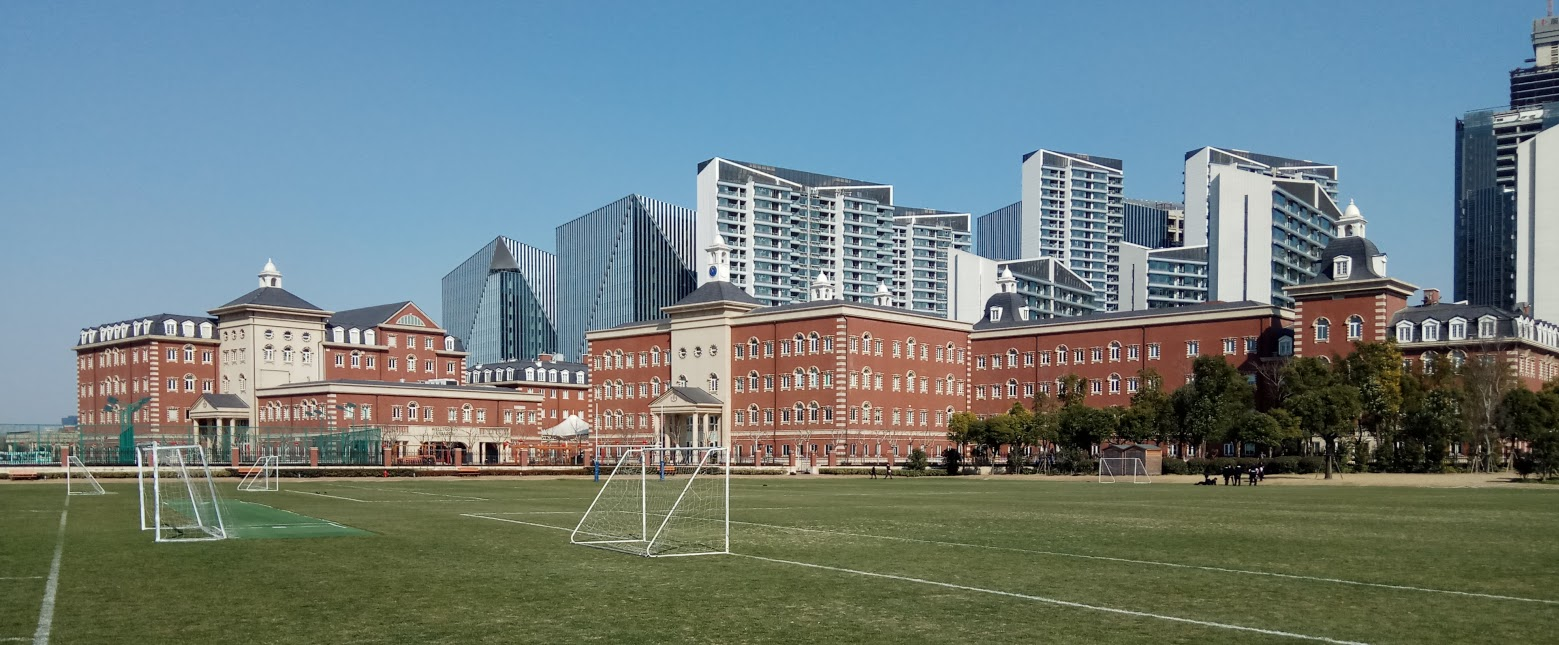
The campus located in Qiantan International Business Zone

Wellington College International Shanghai is a private K–12 school in Shanghai, China.

It is a subsidiary of Wellington College in the United Kingdom.

== Curriculum ==
Pupils at the school follow a mixture of the National Curriculum for England and the International Primary Curriculum from Pre-Nursery until Year 9, which leads to the International General Certificate of Secondary Education IGCSE in Years 10–11. In Years 12 and 13, the pupils study for the internationally recognized International Baccalaureate Diploma Programme (IBDP).

== See also ==
- Wellington College International Tianjin - Another Wellington College campus in Tianjin, China
