= Oliver Wright (diplomat) =

British diplomat

Sir Oliver Wright GCMG GCVO DSC
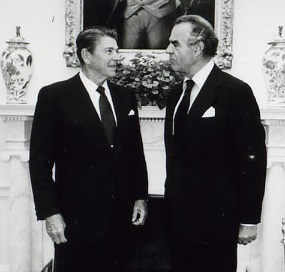
- Wright (right) in the Oval Office, 1982

British Ambassador to the United States
- In office 1982–1986
- Monarch: Elizabeth II
- Counterpart: Charles H. Price II; John J. Louis Jr.
- Preceded by: Sir Nicholas Henderson
- Succeeded by: Sir Antony Acland

Personal details
- Born: 6 March 1922 Hammersmith
- Died: 1 September 2009 (aged 87) England
- Spouse: Marjory Osborne
- Education: Solihull School; Christ's College, Cambridge

Sir John Oliver Wright GCMG GCVO DSC (6 March 1922 – 1 September 2009) was a British diplomat. He was British Ambassador to West Germany from 1975 to 1981 and British Ambassador to the United States from 1982 to 1986.

== Early life ==
Wright was born on 6 March 1921 in Hammersmith, London, England. He was the younger son of Arthur Wright, a catering manager and hotelier, and his wife, Ethel Louisa Hicks, (née Shearod). The family moved from London to the West Midlands when Wright was very young. He was educated at Solihull School, then an all-boys private school in Solihull, West Midlands. He won a scholarship to Christ's College, Cambridge. There, he studied modern languages and specialised in German and French. Following graduation, he joined the military for service during World War II.

His studies were interrupted by World War II. He served in the Royal Naval Reserve (1941–45) and was awarded the Distinguished Service Cross. Following his service he took and passed the Foreign Office exam, thus was accepted to Her Majesty's Diplomatic Service.

== Military service ==
In 1941, having completed his university degree, Wright joined the Royal Naval Volunteer Reserve.

== Diplomatic career ==
Wright's career as a Diplomat was a highly distinguished one:

- New York City (1946–47)
- Bucharest (1948–50)
- Singapore (1950–51)
- Foreign and Commonwealth Office (1952–54)
- Berlin (1954–56)
- Pretoria (1957–58)
- Imperial Defence College (1959)
- Assistant Private Secretary to Secretary of State for Foreign Affairs (1960)
- Counsellor and Private Secretary for Foreign Affairs (1963)
- Private Secretary to the Prime Minister (1964–66) (to Rt Hon. Sir Alec Douglas-Home and subsequently to Rt Hon. Harold Wilson)
- Ambassador to Denmark (1966–69)
- Deputy Home Office Representative to Northern Irish Government (Aug 1969 – Mar 1970)
- Chief Clerk, Her Majesty's Diplomatic Service (1970–72)
- Deputy Under-Secretary of State, FCO (1972–75)
- Ambassador to the Federal Republic of Germany (1975–81)
- Retired from Her Majesty's Diplomatic Service
- Re-appointed, Ambassador to Washington DC (1982–86)

Having retired from the Diplomatic Service in 1981, he was elected Master of Christ's College, Cambridge. He would have become the new Master in 1982, but was recalled to the Diplomatic Service to become British Ambassador to the United States and therefore never took up the appointment.

== Later life ==
On 1 January 1987, Wright was appointed King of Arms of the Order of St Michael and St George. This appointment is the herald, one of six officers, of the Order of St Michael and St George. In July 1996, he was succeeded in the appointment by Sir Ewen Fergusson.

== Honours and decorations ==
On 1 December 1964, he was appointed a Companion of the Order of St Michael and St George (CMG) for his services as Private Secretary to Alec Douglas-Home from 1960 to 1964. On 26 May 1978, he was appointed Knight Grand Cross of the Royal Victorian Order (GCVO). Knight Grand Cross is the highest grade within the Royal Victorian. He was appointed GCVO following the state visit undertaken by Queen Elizabeth II to West Germany between 22 and 26 May 1978.

- Distinguished Service Cross (DSC) (1944)
- Knight Commander of the Order of St Michael and St George (KCMG) (1974 Birthday Honours)
- Knight Grand Cross of the Order of St Michael and St George (GCMG) (1981)

== Offices held ==
Diplomatic posts
Preceded by Ian Samuel	Principal Private Secretary to the Foreign Secretary; 1963	Succeeded by Sir Nicholas Henderson
Preceded by Sir John Henniker-Major	British Ambassador to Denmark; 1966–1969	Succeeded by Sir Murray MacLehose
Preceded by Sir Nicholas Henderson	British Ambassador to West Germany; 1975–1981	Succeeded by Sir John Taylor
Preceded by Sir Nicholas Henderson	British Ambassador to the United States; 1982–1986	Succeeded by Sir Antony Acland
