= Reginald Hibbert =

British diplomat (1922–2002)

Sir Reginald Hibbert GCMG

United Kingdom Ambassador to France
- In office 1979–1982
- President: Valéry Giscard d'Estaing; François Mitterrand
- Preceded by: Sir Nicholas Henderson
- Succeeded by: Sir John Fretwell

Personal details
- Born: 21 February 1922 Ilford, Essex, England
- Died: 5 October 2002 (aged 80) Shrewsbury, Shropshire, England
- Spouse: Ann Alun Pugh
- Education: Worcester College, Oxford

Sir Reginald Alfred Hibbert, GCMG (21 February 1922 – 5 October 2002) was a British diplomat.

== Career ==
Reginald Hibbert was educated at Queen Elizabeth's School, Barnet, and Worcester College, Oxford, where he took a war-shortened course in modern history. After graduating in 1942 he volunteered for the army and was commissioned into the 4th Hussars (a tank regiment). In 1943 he was seconded to the Special Operations Executive and was parachuted into Albania, where he served as a liaison officer first with the nationalists, and then with the communist partisans. In 1944 he rejoined his regiment in Italy, serving as a troop commander until demobilisation. After a further year at Oxford learning Russian he entered the Foreign Service in 1946. In that year, before embarking on a more normal career, he had what he subsequently called a 'highly astonishing pupillage' as a note-taker and occasional interpreter in Russian for Ernest Bevin, the foreign secretary, in Moscow, Paris, and New York.

Hibbert served in Bucharest, Vienna, Guatemala, Ankara and Brussels before volunteering for the post of Chargé d'Affaires in Ulan Bator, Mongolia, 1964–66. He then took a sabbatical research fellowship at Leeds University before being appointed in 1967 to the office of the Commissioner-General in South-East Asia in Singapore, first as head of chancery and then as political adviser to the Commander-in-Chief, Far East. He was Minister at Bonn 1972–75; Assistant Under-Secretary of State, Foreign and Commonwealth Office 1975–76; Deputy Under-Secretary of State 1976–79; and finally Ambassador to France 1979–82. While Ambassador to France, he was known to be abrasive but his honesty was respected.

After retiring from the Diplomatic Service, Hibbert was Director of the Ditchley Foundation 1982–87. He was a Visiting Fellow of Nuffield College, Oxford, 1984–88, and Senior Associate Member, St Antony's College, Oxford, 1983–88. He was Chairman of the Franco-British Society 1990–95; President of the Féderation Britannique des Alliances Françaises, 1997–99; President of the Albanian Society of Britain, 1996–2000.

Hibbert was appointed CMG in 1966 and knighted KCMG in 1979 and GCMG in 1982. He was appointed Commandeur in the Légion d'Honneur in 1995. He was made an Honorary Resident Fellow of University College of Swansea in 1988 and an Honorary Fellow of Worcester College, Oxford, in 1991.

== Publications ==
- The Albanian National Liberation Struggle: the bitter victory, Pinter Publishers, London, 1991. ISBN 0-86187-109-X
- The Kosovo question: origins, present complications and prospects, David Davies Memorial Institute (Occasional paper no.11), London, 1999
- Letters from Mongolia (with Ann Hibbert), Radcliffe Press, London, 2005. ISBN 1-85043-578-2

Diplomatic posts
Preceded by Sir Nicholas Henderson	British Ambassador to France; 1979–1982	Succeeded by Sir John Fretwell
