= Principal Private Secretary to the Secretary of State for Foreign and Commonwealth Affairs =

The principal private secretary to the secretary of state for foreign and Commonwealth affairs is the head of the private office of the foreign minister of His Majesty's Government, and is located in the Foreign and Commonwealth Office Main Building.

== History ==
At the start of the 19th century, the foreign secretary would have had one or two private secretaries, who were often personal appointments of the office-holder. As the complexity of British foreign policy grew significantly, and consequently the size of the private office expanded to provide policy and administrative support; the chief civil servant in the private office became the principal private secretary. Today, he or she is the head of a small department, and the post is a senior and prestigious one, now typically held for a two-year term by an experienced officer from the Diplomatic Service.

The post is director grade equivalent in the Civil Service (SCS2), and also equivalent to a rear admiral in the Royal Navy and major general in the British Army. Holders of the post often go on to hold some of the most senior ambassador posts overseas, and also often honoured with a knighthood.

This list below shows holders' names as they were at the time of holding the post; details of their later careers and honours can be found in individual articles. In addition, the list includes holders of the posts of private secretary to the secretary of state for foreign affairs and then principal private secretary to the secretary of state for foreign affairs (1822–1968). The office of secretary of state for foreign and Commonwealth affairs was created in 1968, by the merger of the Foreign Office and the Commonwealth Office's secretary of state's offices.

== Principal private secretaries ==
- 1822: George Seymour
- 1822–1824: Lord George Bentinck
- 1824–1827: Augustus Stapleton
- 1827–1830: Digby Wrangham
- 1830–1833: John Walpole
- 1833–1834: Stephen Sulivan
- 1834–1835: Algernon Greville
- 1835–1840: Charles Cowper
- 1840–1841: James Howard
- 1841–1846: Clinton Dawkins
- 1846–1852: Spencer Ponsonby
- 1852: George Harris
- 1852–1853: Arthur Russell
- 1853–1857: Spencer Ponsonby (Second term)
- 1857–1858: Villiers Lister
- 1858–1859: John Bidwell
- 1859–1865: George Elliot
- 1865–1866: Villiers Lister (Second term)
- 1866–1868: Thomas Sanderson
- 1868–1870: Villiers Lister (Third term)
- 1870–1871: Robert Meade
- 1871–1874: Thomas Wetherell
- 1874–1878: Thomas Sanderson (Second term)
- 1878–1880: Philip Currie
- 1880–1885: Thomas Sanderson (Third term)
- 1885–1886: Eric Barrington
- 1886: Francis Hyde Villiers
- 1886–1892: Eric Barrington (Second term)
- 1892–1894: Francis Hyde Villiers (Second term)
- 1894–1895: Armine Wodehouse
- 1895–1905: Sir Eric Barrington (Third term)
- 1906–1907: Louis du Pan Mallet
- 1907–1915: Sir William Tyrrell
- 1915–1919: Sir Eric Drummond
- 1920–1924: Robert Vansittart
- 1924–1932: Sir Walford Selby
- 1932–1935: Horace Seymour
- 1936–1939: Oliver Harvey
- 1939–1941: Ralph Stevenson
- 1941–1943: Oliver Harvey (Second term)
- 1943–1947: Pierson Dixon
- 1947–1949: Frank Roberts
- 1949–1951: Roderick Barclay
- 1951–1954: Evelyn Shuckburgh
- 1954–1955: Sir Anthony Rumbold
- 1955–1956: Patrick Hancock
- 1956–1959: Denis Laskey
- 1959–1963: Ian Samuel
- 1963: Oliver Wright
- 1963–1965: Nicholas Henderson
- 1965–1967: Murray MacLehose
- 1967–1969: Donald Maitland
- 1969–1972: John Graham
- 1972–1975: Antony Acland
- 1975: Stephen Barrett
- 1975–1978: Ewen Fergusson
- 1978–1981: George Walden
- 1981–1984: Brian Fall
- 1984–1986: Leonard Appleyard
- 1986–1988: Anthony Galsworthy
- 1988–1990: Stephen Wall
- 1990–1993: Richard Gozney
- 1993–1995: John Sawers
- 1995–1997: William Ehrman
- 1997–1999: John Grant
- 1999–2001: Sherard Cowper-Coles
- 2001–2003: Simon McDonald
- 2003–2005: Geoffrey Adams
- 2005–2007: Peter Hayes
- 2007–2010: Matthew Gould
- 2010–2012: Lindsay Croisdale-Appleby
- 2012–2014: Thomas Drew
- 2014–2018: Martin Reynolds
- January–June 2018: Jonathan Sinclair
- June 2018–April 2019: Serena Stone
- June 2019–January 2021: Susannah Goshko
- January 2021 – 2022: Nick Catsaras
- Unknown
- c. 2023–2024: Rachel Emma-Jane King
- 2024: Caroline Hurndell

== See also ==
- Principal Private Secretary to the Prime Minister of the United Kingdom
  - Private Secretary for Foreign Affairs to the Prime Minister
