= John Fretwell =

British diplomat (1930–2017)

Sir John Fretwell GCMG

Deputy Under-Secretary of State for Foreign and Commonwealth Affairs
- In office 1987–1990
- Preceded by: Derek Thomas
- Succeeded by: John Weston

British Ambassador to France
- In office 1982–1987
- Preceded by: Reginald Hibbert
- Succeeded by: Ewen Fergusson

Personal details
- Born: 15 June 1930 Chesterfield, Derbyshire, England
- Died: 30 March 2017 (aged 86)
- Education: University of Lausanne; King's College, Cambridge

Sir John Emsley Fretwell, GCMG (15 June 1930 – 30 March 2017) was a British diplomat.

== Career ==
Fretwell was educated at Chesterfield Grammar School, the University of Lausanne and King's College, Cambridge. He served in the Royal Regiment of Artillery 1948–50 and joined the Diplomatic Service in 1953. He served in Hong Kong, Peking, Moscow and Washington, D.C., as Commercial Counsellor in Warsaw 1971–73, at the Foreign and Commonwealth Office in London as Head of the European Integration Department 1973–76 and as Assistant Under-Secretary 1976–79. He was Minister in Washington, D.C. 1980–81, British Ambassador to France 1982–87 and Political Director and Deputy to the Permanent Under-Secretary of State for Foreign and Commonwealth Affairs 1987–90.

After retiring from the Diplomatic Service, Fretwell was a member of the Council of Lloyd's 1991–92, specialist adviser to the House of Lords 1992–93 and specialist assessor for the Higher Education Funding Council 1995–96. He was also chairman of the Franco-British Society 1995–2005.

Fretwell was appointed CMG in 1975, knighted KCMG in 1982, and promoted to GCMG in 1987.

He died on 30 March 2017 at the age of 86.

== Personal life ==
In 1959 Fretwell married Mary Dubois, who as Lady Fretwell founded "Passports for Pets" to create an alternative to the quarantine system for cats and dogs entering and returning to the UK. She was appointed OBE in the 2001 New Year Honours for services to pet owners and animal welfare. They adopted Emma Jane Fretwell and Charles Benjamin Fretwell. Emma married in 1996 to Nick Plumbridge and had 3 children, which are Sir John and Lady Mary's only grandchildren, Jessica Mary Plumbridge (1997), Isobel Grace Plumbridge (1999), and Lucy Catherine Plumbridge (2001).

Diplomatic posts
Preceded by Sir Reginald Hibbert	British Ambassador to France; 1982–1987	Succeeded by Sir Ewen Fergusson
