= Ian Samuel =

British diplomat (1915–2010)

Adrian Christopher Ian Samuel CMG CVO (20 August 1915 – 26 December 2010) was a Royal Air Force pilot, British diplomat, and director of chemical and agrochemical trade associations.

== Career ==
Ian Samuel was educated at Rugby School and St John's College, Oxford. He joined the Diplomatic Service in 1938 and served brief postings in Beirut, Tunis and Trieste before volunteering for the Royal Air Force in 1940. He served in 206 Squadron of Coastal Command, and was pilot of a Flying Fortress that sank German submarine U-169 in March 1943.

After the war Samuel returned to the Diplomatic Service with postings at Ankara, Cairo and Damascus. From 1959 to 1963 he was Principal Private Secretary to the Foreign Secretary, Selwyn Lloyd, then briefly to Sir Alec Douglas-Home. In late 1963 he was appointed minister (second to the Ambassador) at Madrid. He left the Diplomatic Service in 1965 and was director of the British Chemical Engineering Contractors Association 1966–69 and of the British Agrochemicals Association 1972–78, then director-general of Groupement International des Associations Nationales de Fabricants de Produits Agrochimiques (GIFAP, now CropLife International) 1978–79.

Samuel was appointed CMG in the Queen's Birthday Honours of 1959 and CVO in the New Year Honours of 1963.

== Publications ==
- Plant Protection in Modern Agriculture (English edition, with Hans-Hermann Cramer), British Agrochemicals Association, 1979
- An Astonishing Fellow: The Life of General Sir Robert Wilson, Kensal Press, 1985, ISBN 0946041350
- A Mouthful of Ashes, The Spectator, 19 December 1987, Page 49

Diplomatic posts
| Preceded by Sir Denis Laskey | Principal Private Secretary to the Secretary of State for Foreign and Commonwealth Affairs; 1959–1963 | Succeeded by Sir Oliver Wright |
| Preceded by Peter Hope | Minister at the British Embassy, Madrid; 1963–1965 | Succeeded by Nicholas Henderson |
