= Nicholas Henderson =

British diplomat (1919–2009)

Sir Nicholas Henderson GCMG KCVO

British Ambassador to the United States
- In office 1979–1982
- Monarch: Elizabeth II
- Prime Minister: Margaret Thatcher
- Preceded by: Peter Jay
- Succeeded by: Oliver Wright

British Ambassador to France
- In office 1975–1979
- Prime Minister: Harold Wilson; James Callaghan
- Preceded by: Edward Tomkins
- Succeeded by: Reginald Hibbert

British Ambassador to West Germany
- In office 1972–1975
- Prime Minister: Edward Heath; Harold Wilson
- Chancellor: Helmut Schmidt
- Preceded by: Frank Roberts
- Succeeded by: Oliver Wright

British Ambassador to Poland
- In office 1969–1972
- Prime Minister: Harold Wilson; Edward Heath
- Preceded by: Thomas Brimelow
- Succeeded by: Frank Brenchley

Personal details
- Born: 1 April 1919
- Died: 16 March 2009 (aged 89)
- Education: Stowe School
- Alma mater: Hertford College, Oxford

Sir John Nicholas Henderson, GCMG, KCVO (1 April 1919 – 16 March 2009), known as Nicko Henderson, was a British diplomat and writer, who served as British Ambassador to the United States from 1979 to 1982.

== Life and career ==
Henderson was born in London, the only son and second of three children of Sir Hubert Henderson, a prominent political economist and later Drummond Professor of Political Economy at Oxford, and of Faith Marion Jane Henderson, née Bagenal.

Nicholas was educated at Stowe School and Hertford College, Oxford, and was the President of the Oxford Union. Childhood tuberculosis disqualified him from military service during World War II. Instead, in 1942, he joined the Cairo staff of Lord Moyne, Minister Resident in the Middle East, on a temporary basis. In 1944, he was appointed Assistant Private Secretary to the Foreign Secretary, Sir Anthony Eden, and then to Ernest Bevin.

He joined the British Diplomatic Service in 1946 and rose to become Private Secretary to the Foreign Secretary in 1963. Subsequently, he served as British Ambassador to Poland, Germany and finally France, from which post he retired in 1979 on his sixtieth birthday.

=== Valedictory dispatch and Ambassadorship to the United States ===
Upon retiring (as he thought) from the foreign service when relinquishing his post in Paris, he wrote a final dispatch titled "Britain's decline; its causes and consequences". The Economist obtained a copy and printed it in the same year, stating "The despatch does not, needless to say, reach us from him and was presumably written for very limited circulation. But it is so unusually forthright and timely, particularly in its middle and concluding passages on British policy in Europe, under governments of every stripe, as to merit publication virtually in full."

A surprise extension to Henderson's career came about because of the election of Margaret Thatcher as Prime Minister in May of that year. Thatcher invited him to return to service as Ambassador to Washington, where he served until 1982. She had first asked Edward Heath to take up the post, but he had refused the offer. Henderson was enormously popular in Washington, and he and his wife Mary formed a close personal friendship with President Ronald Reagan at a crucial time in the latter's presidency, oiling the special friendship which developed between Reagan and Margaret Thatcher. In particular, he was successful in putting forward the British side of the Falklands War in 1982, and maintaining friendly relations between the nations when that friendship was under some strain.

In retirement, Henderson wrote several books on history, and an account of his career as a diplomat, Mandarin. He held directorships of several major British companies, including the Channel Tunnel Group, Sotheby's, and Hambros. He also had close ties with the Prince of Wales, serving as Lord Warden of the Stannaries and Chairman of the Prince's Council (the body which oversees the Duchy of Cornwall) after retiring from the Diplomatic Service. He was appointed KCVO for this service to the Crown. He gave the Romanes Lecture in Oxford in 1986.

In 1951, Henderson married Mary Barber (née Cawadias), a Greek-born former war correspondent for Time-Life. She died in 2004. Their only child, Alexandra Nicolette, married the photographer Derry Moore, now the 12th Earl of Drogheda. As Alexandra Henderson, she has followed a career as a television and radio producer specialising in current affairs.

He was generally known as "Nicko (sp. "Nico" in Lady Thatcher's memoirs) Henderson" in private life.

== Bibliography ==
- Prince Eugen of Savoy. A Biography Weidenfeld & Nicolson, (1964)
- The Birth of N.A.T.O., (1982)
- The Private Office, (1984)
- Channels and Tunnels: Reflections on Britain and Abroad, (1987)
- Diplomatic Immunity: Principles, Practices, Problems by Grant V. McClanahan, with a foreword by Sir Nicholas Henderson (1989)
- Mandarin: The Diaries of an Ambassador 1969-1982, (1994)
- Old Friends and Other Instances, (2000)
- The Private Office Revisited, (2001)

== In popular culture ==
Ian Fleming, author of the James Bond series, was a friend of Henderson, and gave his name to the character "Dikko" Henderson in his final completed Bond novel, You Only Live Twice.

Henderson was portrayed by Jeremy Clyde in the 2002 BBC production of Ian Curteis's controversial The Falklands Play.

== Diplomatic posts and offices ==
Diplomatic posts
Preceded by Sir Oliver Wright	Principal Private Secretary to the Foreign Secretary; 1963–1965	Succeeded by Murray, The Lord MacLehose of Beoch
Preceded by Ian Samuel	Minister at the British Embassy, Madrid; 1965–1969	Succeeded by Thomas Keeble
Preceded by Thomas, The Lord Brimelow	British Ambassador to Poland; 1969–1972	Succeeded by Frank Brenchley
Preceded by Sir Roger Jackling	British Ambassador to West Germany; 1972–1975	Succeeded by Sir Oliver Wright
Preceded by Sir Edward Tomkins	British Ambassador to France; 1975–1979	Succeeded by Sir Reginald Hibbert
Preceded by Peter Jay	British Ambassador to the United States; 1979–1982	Succeeded by Sir Oliver Wright
Court offices
Preceded by Peter, The Marquess of Lothian	Lord Warden of the Stannaries; 1985–1990	Succeeded by John, The Lord Ashburton
