= Eric Barrington =

British civil servant (1847–1918)

Sir Bernard Eric Edward Barrington KCB (5 June 1847 – 24 February 1918) was a British civil servant who was principal private secretary to three Foreign Secretaries.

== Career ==
The Honourable Bernard Eric Edward Barrington, youngest son of William Barrington, 6th Viscount Barrington, was educated at Eton College and joined the Foreign Office (FCO) in 1867. He was private secretary to two Parliamentary Under-Secretaries of State for Foreign Affairs, Arthur Otway and Viscount Enfield, 1868–1874. In 1874 he became précis writer to the Foreign Secretary, the Earl of Derby, and continued under Derby's successor, Lord Salisbury. He accompanied Salisbury to the Congress of Berlin in 1878 and was given the diplomatic rank of Second Secretary for the purpose. When Salisbury became Prime Minister for the first time in 1885, Barrington became Principal Private Secretary to the new Foreign Secretary, Lord Iddesleigh, 1885–86. He was Principal Private Secretary to Lord Salisbury (in his role as Foreign Secretary) in 1886–92 and 1895–1900, and then to the Marquess of Lansdowne 1900–05. When Sir Edward Grey succeeded Lord Lansdowne as Foreign Secretary in December 1905 Barrington was appointed Assistant Under-Secretary for Africa, but retired in July 1907.

Save during the short period when he was attached to the special British Embassy that attended the Congress of Berlin in 1878, the whole career of Sir Eric Barrington was passed in the Foreign Office. He was a distinguished representative of the class of higher permanent officials who are the custodians of tradition and the wardens of continuity in the great Departments of State. The public at large knows little or nothing of their work. From time to time their names appear as the recipients of a C.B. or a K.C.B., but their contact with the world, outside the walls of their office, is limited and intermittent. Their names and qualities are, as a rule, far better known to foreign Governments and to foreign diplomatists than to their own fellow-countrymen. Their reward consists in the confidence of their chiefs and the esteem of their colleagues. Though they sometimes wield great influence, they have no direct responsibility, and the chief guarantee against any misuse of their powers lies in their own patriotism and conscientiousness.
— The Times, 26 February 1918

Barrington was appointed Companion of the Order of the Bath (CB) in the 1889 Birthday Honours. He was promoted to a Knight Commander (KCB) in the order in the 1902 Coronation Honours list published on 26 June 1902, and received the knighthood in a private audience with King Edward VII on 2 August, during the King's convalescence on board HMY Victoria and Albert.

Diplomatic posts
| Preceded by Thomas Sanderson | Principal Private Secretary to the Secretary of State for Foreign and Commonwealth Affairs; 1885–1886 | Succeeded by Francis Hyde Villiers |
| Preceded by Francis Hyde Villiers | Principal Private Secretary to the Secretary of State for Foreign and Commonwealth Affairs; 1886–1892 | Succeeded by Francis Hyde Villiers |
| Preceded by Armine Wodehouse | Principal Private Secretary to the Secretary of State for Foreign and Commonwealth Affairs; 1895–1905 | Succeeded by Louis du Pan Mallet |
