= Wellington College Bog =

Site of Special Scientific Interest in Berkshire, England

- Site of Special Scientific Interest
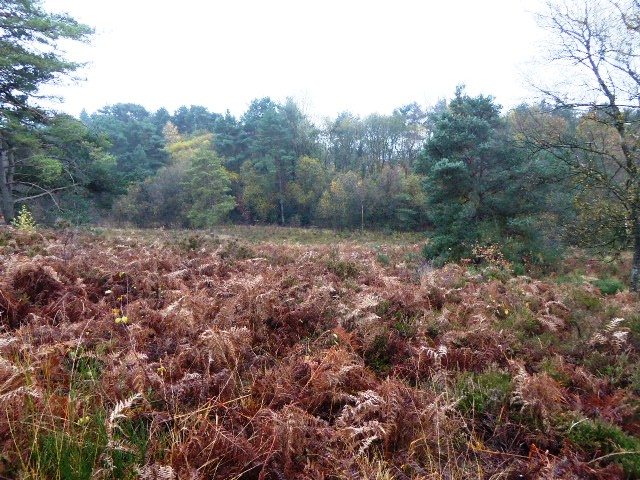

- Location within Berkshire
- Location of Wellington College Bog.
- Area of search: Berkshire
- Grid reference: SU 832 627
- Coordinates: 51.357°N 0.807°W
- Interest: Biological
- Area: 6.2 hectares (15 acres)
- Notification date: 1986
- Location map: Magic Map

Wellington College Bog is a 6.2-hectare (15-acre) biological Site of Special Scientific Interest in the grounds of Wellington College on the northern outskirts of Sandhurst in Berkshire.

The site features a valley bog, which is one of the richest in the county, in terms of bryophytes and flowering plants, containing several species which are uncommon or rare in southern Britain.

== Fauna ==
The nature reserve has the following fauna:

=== Invertebrates ===
- Bog bush cricket
- Keeled skimmer

== Flora ==
The site has the following Flora:

=== Trees ===
- Betula pubescens
- Salix cinerea
- alder buckthorn
- oak
- silver birch
- rowan
- Scots pine

=== Plants ===
- Sphagnum papillosum
- Sphagnum capillifolium
- Sphagnum magellanicum
- Sphagnum cuspidatum
- Cephalozia connivens
- Kurzia pauciflora
- Drosera rotundifolia
- Narthecium ossifragum
- Eriophorum angustifolium
- Erica tetralix
- Molinia caerulea
- Juncus acutiflorus
- Trichophorum cespitosum
- Sphagnum compactum
- Sphagnum tenellum
- Sphagnum molle
- Eleocharis multicaulis
- Carex echinata
- Rhynchospora alba
- Juncus squarrosus
- Lysimachia tenella (syn. Anagallis tenella)
- Pedicularis sylvatica
- Carex binervis
- Juncus kochii
- Cirsium dissectum
- Succisa pratensis
- Sphagnum recurvum
- Potamogeton polygonifolius
- Calluna vulgaris
- Erica cinerea
- Ulex europaeus
- Genista anglica
- Senecio sylvaticus
- Potentilla erecta
- Deschampsia flexuosa
- Danthonia decumbens
- Juncus tenuis
