= Ernest Tomkins =

English cricketer and British Army officer

Personal information
- Full name: Ernest Leith Tomkins
- Born: 15 February 1869; Rangoon, Burma, British India
- Died: 27 May 1927 (aged 58); Dieppe, Normandy, France
- Batting: Right-handed
- Role: Wicket-keeper

Domestic team information
- Years: Team
- 1899/00–1900/01: Europeans

Career statistics
Competition	First-class
Matches	2
Runs scored	67
Batting average	22.33
100s/50s	–/1
Top score	65
Catches/stumpings	3/2
- Source: ESPNcricinfo, 22 November 2022

Ernest Leith Tomkins (15 February 1869 – 17 May 1927) was an English first-class cricketer and British Army officer.

The son of Major-General William Percival Tomkins and his wife, Annie, he was born in British Burma at Rangoon in February 1869. He was educated at Wellington College, before attending the Royal Military Academy. He graduated in February 1888 as a second lieutenant into the Royal Artillery, with promotion to lieutenant in February 1891. He was seconded in September 1897 to the Indian Ordnance Department, with promotion to captain following during his secondment in October 1898. Tomkins played first-class cricket in British India as a wicket-keeper for the Europeans cricket team on two occasions against the Parsees in the Bombay Presidency Matches of 1899 and 1900. He scored 67 runs at an average of 22.33; his highest score of 65 came in the 1899 fixture, and was the second highest score of the Europeans first innings, behind J. G. Greig's 184.

Tomkins was later promoted to major in December 1908, before serving in the First World War, during which he was promoted to lieutenant colonel in February 1916. Following four years service as a regimental lieutenant colonel, he was placed on the half-pay list in January 1921 and was removed from the Reserve of Officers in March 1924, having obtained the age limit of liability to recall. Tomkins was married to Marie-Louise Marigny, a Frenchwoman. Their son, Edward, was a British diplomat. Tomkins died in France at Dieppe in May 1927.
