= Francis Hyde Villiers =

British civil servant and diplomat

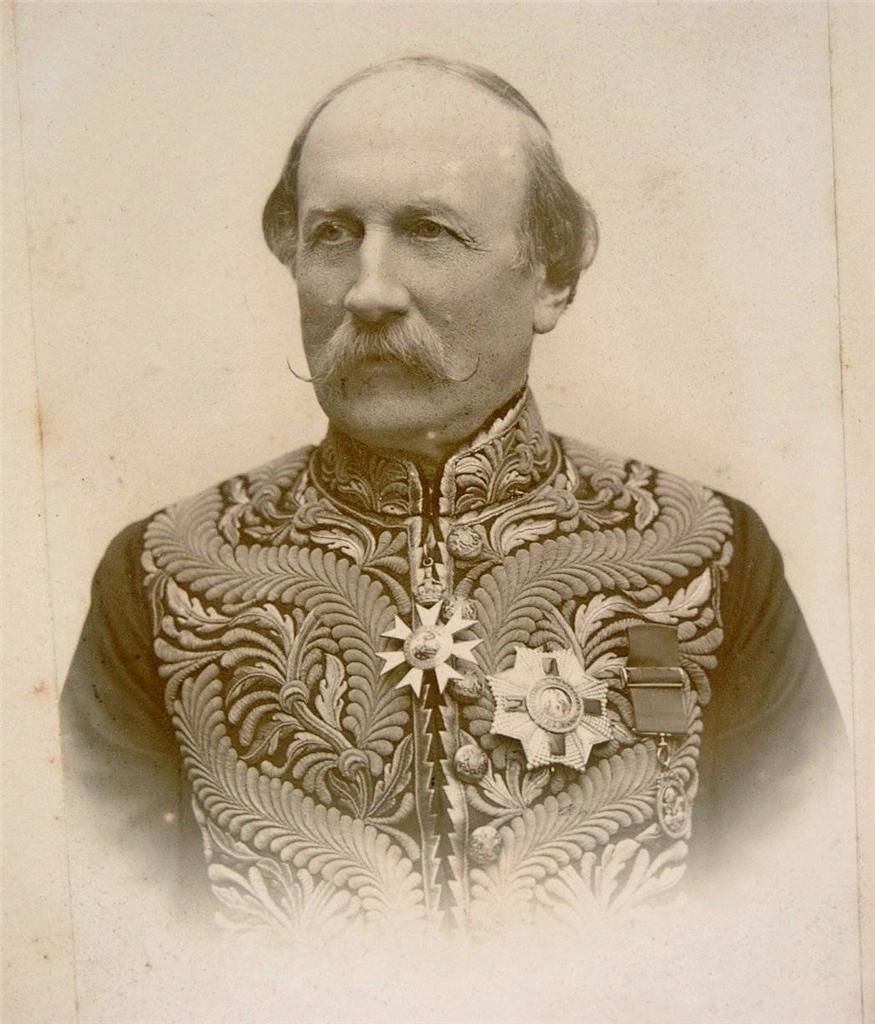
Sir Francis Hyde Villiers

Sir Francis Hyde Villiers GCMG GCVO CB PC (13 August 1852 – 18 November 1925) was a British civil servant and diplomat who was ambassador to Portugal and Belgium.

== Career ==
The youngest son of George Villiers, 4th Earl of Clarendon, Francis Villiers was educated at Harrow School and entered the Foreign Office in 1870. He was appointed Acting Second Secretary in the Diplomatic Service in 1885, and served as Private Secretary to the Foreign Secretary, Lord Rosebery, in 1886 and 1892–94, and Acting Private Secretary to Lord Salisbury in 1887. From 1896 to 1905 he was Assistant Under Secretary at the Foreign Office. In 1906 he was appointed to be Minister to Portugal, and in 1911 he was transferred to be Minister to Belgium.

When the German army invaded Belgium in 1914 the Belgian Government retreated first to Antwerp and then to Le Havre (although King Albert remained in De Panne commanding the Belgian Army) and Villiers accompanied it until the end of the war, when he returned to Brussels. After the peace treaty had been signed, the British Legation at Brussels was raised to an Embassy and Villiers was promoted to Ambassador in October 1919. He retired in August 1920.

== Honours ==
Francis Villiers was appointed CB in 1894, knighted KCMG in 1906 on his appointment to Portugal, given the additional knighthood of GCVO on the occasion of the King of Portugal's visit to England in 1909 and promoted GCMG in the New Year Honours of 1918. He was appointed to the Privy Council in August 1919.

The King of Portugal gave him the Grand Cross of the Order of Christ, and the King of the Belgians gave him the Grand Cross of the Order of Leopold.

== Offices held ==
Diplomatic posts
Preceded by Sir Eric Barrington	Principal Private Secretary to the Foreign Secretary; 1886, 1892–1894	Succeeded by Sir Eric Barrington
Preceded by Sir Martin Gosselin	Envoy Extraordinary and Minister Plenipotentiary at the Court of His Majesty the King of Portugal; 1906–1911	Succeeded by Sir Arthur Hardinge
Preceded by Sir Arthur Hardinge	Envoy Extraordinary and Minister Plenipotentiary at the Court of His Majesty the King of the Belgians; 1911–1919	Succeeded by himself, as Ambassador
Preceded by himself, as Minister	Ambassador Extraordinary and Plenipotentiary to His Majesty the King of the Belgians; 1919–1920	Succeeded by Sir George Grahame
