= Richard Skemp =

Richard Skemp FBPsS
- Born: Richard Rowland Skemp; 10 March 1919; Bristol, England
- Died: 22 June 1995 (aged 76); Coventry, England

Academic background
- Education: Hertford College, Oxford; University of Manchester
- Thesis: Investigation into difficulties in learning mathematics by children of good general intelligence (1959)

Academic work
- Discipline: Psychology
- Sub-discipline: Mathematics education; education theory; learning theory
- Institutions: University of Manchester; University of Warwick

Richard Rowland Skemp, FBPsS (10 March 1919 – 22 June 1995) was a British mathematician, psychologist and academic, who specialised in mathematical education. Having started his career as a school teacher, he became a lecturer in psychology at the University of Manchester in 1955. He was appointed Professor of Educational Theory at Warwick University in 1973 and also served as director of its Mathematics Education Research Centre from 1978 until he retired in 1986.

== Biography ==
Skemp was born on 10 March 1919 in Bristol, England. His father, Professor Arthur Rowland Skemp, had been killed in action during the First World War on 1 November 1918. As a foundation scholar, he was educated at Wellington College, then an all-boys independent school in Berkshire which had been set up for the sons of deceased army officers. He won an open scholarship in mathematics at Hertford College, Oxford, matriculating in 1937.

His university studies were interrupted by military service during the Second World War. On 24 May 1941, having trained at an Officer Cadet Training Unit, he was commissioned in the British Army as a second lieutenant to serve in the Royal Corps of Signals. He served in India and had reached the rank of captain by the end of the war.

After the end of the war, Skemp returned to Oxford to continue his studies. He graduated from the University of Oxford with a Bachelor of Arts (BA) degree in 1947. He then worked as a mathematics teacher at two private schools; first Oundle School and then at Rye St Antony School. After developing an interesting in how children learn, he returned to Oxford to undertake a second undergraduate degree in psychology in 1952. He then moved to the Department of Education, University of Manchester to undertake a Doctor of Philosophy (PhD) degree under the supervision of C. E. M. Hansel and Professor John Cohen. He completed his PhD in 1959 with a doctoral thesis titled "Investigation into difficulties in learning mathematics by children of good general intelligence".

Skemp joined the academic staff of the University of Manchester as a lecturer in psychology in 1955. He was promoted to senior lecturer in 1962. In 1973, he joined the University of Warwick as Professor of Educational Theory. He also served as director of the Mathematics Education Research Centre at Warwick from 1978 to 1986. He retired from full-time academia in 1986, but continued to lecture around the world. He was visiting professor at the University of Calgary from 1987 to 1994.

== Personal life ==
In 1961, Skemp married Valerie Watts. Together they had one son. In January 1995, Skemp was diagnosed with non-Hodgkin's lymphoma. He died on 22 June 1995, aged 76, in Coventry, England.

== Selected works ==
- Skemp, Richard R. (February 1961). "Reflective Intelligence and Mathematics". British Journal of Educational Psychology. 31 (P1): 45–55. doi:10.1111/j.2044-8279.1961.tb01701.x.
- Skemp, Richard R. (1971). The psychology of learning mathematics. Harmondsworth: Penguin Books. ISBN 9780140212105.
- Skemp, R. R. (1976). "Relational understanding and instrumental understanding" (PDF). Mathematics Teaching. 77 (1): 20–26.
- Skemp, Richard R. (1979). Intelligence, learning, and action: a foundation for theory and practice in education. Chichester: Wiley.
- Skemp, Richard R. (1989). Mathematics in the primary school. London: Routledge. ISBN 978-0415025195.
