= Wellington College International Tianjin =

British international school in Tianjin, China

- Chinese: 天津惠灵顿国际学校
- Hongqiao, Tianjin

Information
- School type: International Boarding School
- Established: 2011; 15 years ago
- Age: 2 to 18
- Language: English
- Affiliation: Wellington College
- Website: https://tianjin.wellingtoncollege.cn/

Wellington College International Tianjin
- Simplified Chinese: 天津惠灵顿国际学校
- Traditional Chinese: 天津惠靈頓國際學校
Transcriptions
Standard Mandarin
- Hanyu Pinyin: Tiānjīn Huìlíngdùn Guójì Xuéxiào

Reith Legislation British International School of Tianjin
- Simplified Chinese: 天津英思立国际学校
- Traditional Chinese: 天津英思立國際學校
Transcriptions
Standard Mandarin
- Hanyu Pinyin: Tiānjīn Yīngsīlì Guójì Xuéxiào

Wellington College International Tianjin (Chinese: 天津惠灵顿国际学校) is a British international school in Hongqiao District, Tianjin. It is affiliated with Wellington College in Berkshire, England and serves students 2-18; senior school serves ages 11–18.

On 1 February 2009 it was registered under the name "Reith Legislation British International School", but the name was changed to the current one on 13 October 2009. The school opened in 2011. The initial expected student account was 500 and the school planned to eventually have up to 1,200 students. The school was scheduled to open with A levels and offer IB diplomas after receiving permission from the International Baccalaureate Organisation. A school must already be open before receiving permission to offer IB.

== Campus ==
The campus has more than 90 classrooms, 2 swimming pools, art rooms, design rooms, a dance studio, a 500-seat theatre, and music rooms. There are also artificial sports pitches.

There are boarding facilities for senior school students. Wellington Tianjin was scheduled to initially open as only a day school, and it's now offering boarding to students above year 7.

== Demographics ==
In 2011 Warwick Mansell of The Telegraph stated that it was anticipated that the largest group of students would be of East Asian origin, including Mainland Chinese students with foreign passports, Japanese, and Koreans. People from the United Kingdom were expected to make up 15% of the student body and the school also expected to have significant numbers of other European nationalities.

== See also ==
- Wellington College International Shanghai - Another Wellington College school in China
- Wellington College Bilingual Shanghai - Another Wellington College campus in China
