= William Tyrrell, 1st Baron Tyrrell =

British civil servant and diplomat

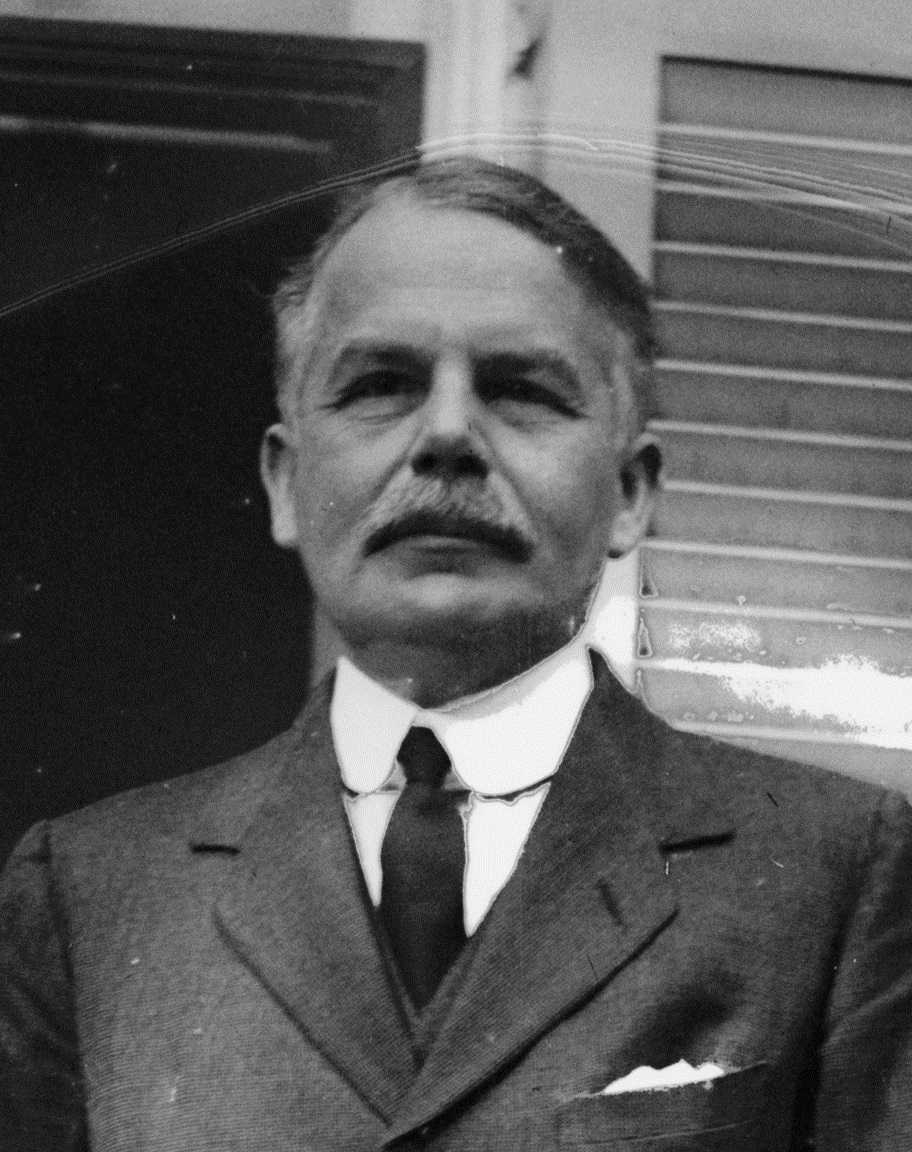
Tyrrell c. 1918-20

William George Tyrrell, 1st Baron Tyrrell, GCB, GCMG, KCVO, PC (17 August 1866 – 14 March 1947) was a British civil servant and diplomat. He was Permanent Under-Secretary of State for Foreign Affairs between 1925 and 1928 and British Ambassador to France from 1928 to 1934.

== Background and education ==
Tyrrell was the son of Sir Judge William Henry Tyrrell and his wife Julia Wakefield (daughter of Col. John Howard Wakefield and his Christian-convert wife, Maria Isobel, daughter of the Hereditary Vizier of Bushahr).

He was the nephew-in-law of Hugo Fürst Radoliński-Leszczyc von Radolin.

Tyrrell was educated in Germany (he spoke fluent German) and at Balliol College, Oxford.

== Career ==
Tyrrell served in the Foreign Office from 1889 at the British embassy in Rome. He returned firstly as precis-writer from 1905 to 1907 and later, with Louis Mallet, as private secretary to Sir Edward Grey from 1907 to 1915. He was appointed a Companion of the Order of the Bath (CB) in 1909, and a Knight Commander of the Order of St Michael and St George (KCMG) in the 1913 New Year Honours.

Tyrrell supported the Entente Cordiale with France and did not think a rapprochement with the German Empire was possible before 1914. There were secret renewal propose alliances with German Empire.

He appears to have been one of Grey's few intimates but an inherent laziness and frustration with red tape make an assessment of his influence difficult. Certainly however Tyrrell played a more important role than his title might suggest and, for example, in the autumn of 1913 he was sent to Washington as a personal ambassador by Grey to discuss the situation in Mexico following the overthrow of Francisco I. Madero.

In the spring of 1915 Tyrrell appears to have suffered an almost total breakdown (perhaps precipitated by the death of his younger son that year) and he was moved to a less stressful job at the Home Office before being made head of the Political Intelligence Department from 1916 to 1919. He was appointed a Knight Commander of the Royal Victorian Order (KCVO) in December 1919. At the Paris Peace Conference, he served on the British Empire Delegation as Lord Hardinge's assistant. He was Permanent Under-Secretary from 1925 to 1928 and British Ambassador to France from 1928 to 1934. He was promoted to Knight Grand Cross of the Order of St Michael and St George (GCMG) in the 1925 Birthday Honours, and to Knight Commander of the Order of the Bath (KCB) in the 1927 Birthday Honours. As Permanent Under-Secretary he did not think there was a military threat from the Japanese Empire and that the Soviet Union was the enemy. As Ambassador he worked for an Anglo-French agreement. He was also suspicious of Nazi Germany after Adolf Hitler's rise to power. He was sworn of the Privy Council in 1928 and made a Peer as Baron Tyrrell of Avon in the County of Southampton, in the 1929 Birthday Honours. In 1935 he was appointed President of the British Board of Film Censors, a post he held until 1947.

== Personal life ==
Lord Tyrrell married Margaret Ann, daughter of David Urquhart, in 1890. He died in March 1947, aged 80, when the barony became extinct as both his sons had been killed in the First World War.

== Notes ==
Diplomatic posts
Preceded by Sir Louis du Pan Mallet	Principal Private Secretary to the Foreign Secretary; 1907–1915	Succeeded by Eric, The Earl of Perth
Preceded by Eyre Crowe	Permanent Under-Secretary of State for Foreign Affairs; 1925–1928	Succeeded by Hon. Ronald Lindsay
Preceded by The Marquess of Crewe	British Ambassador to France; 1928–1934	Succeeded by George Clerk
Media offices
Preceded by Edward Shortt	President of the British Board of Film Censors; 1935–1947	Succeeded by Sidney Harris
Peerage of the United Kingdom
New creation	Baron Tyrrell; 1929–1947	Extinct
