= Edward Tomkins =

British diplomat (1915–2007)

Sir Edward Tomkins GCMG CVO
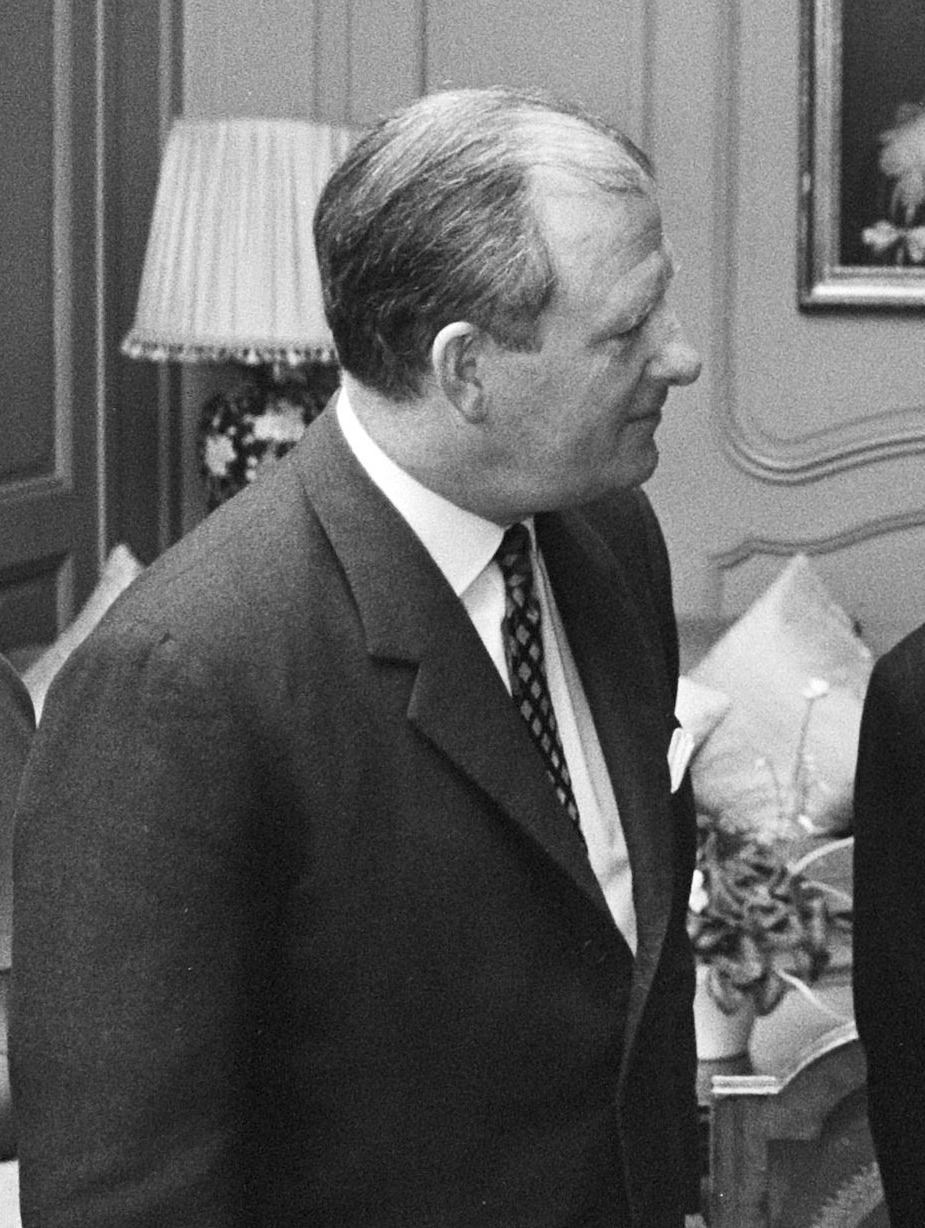
- Edward Tomkins in 1970

British Ambassador to France
- In office 1972–1975
- Preceded by: Sir Christopher Soames
- Succeeded by: Sir Nicholas Henderson

British Ambassador to the Netherlands
- In office 1970–1972
- Preceded by: Sir Peter Garan
- Succeeded by: John Barnes

Personal details
- Born: 16 November 1915 Jubbulpore, India
- Died: 20 September 2007 (aged 91) Sibbertoft, England
- Party: Conservative
- Spouse: Gillian Benson (m. 1955; died 2003)
- Education: Trinity College, Cambridge
- Occupation: Diplomat
- Awards: Croix de Guerre

Military service
- Allegiance: United Kingdom
- Branch/service: British Army
- Years of service: 1940–1944
- Unit: Intelligence Corps
- Battles/wars: Second World War

Sir Edward Emile Tomkins GCMG CVO (16 November 1915 – 20 September 2007) was a British diplomat, who served as British Ambassador to the Netherlands from 1970 to 1972, and British Ambassador to France from 1972 to 1975. He owned Winslow Hall in Winslow, Buckinghamshire, often attributed to Christopher Wren, from 1959.

== Biography ==
Tomkins was the son of Lieutenant Colonel Ernest Leith Tomkins and his French wife, and was raised partly in France and thus grew up speaking perfect French. He was educated at Ampleforth College and Trinity College, Cambridge. He joined the Diplomatic Service in 1939. After joining the Army in 1940 during World War II, he served as a liaison officer with the Free French Forces in the Middle East. He was captured by German Field Marshal Erwin Rommel in 1941 while making his way back to British lines from the battle of Bir Hakeim with French General Marie Pierre Kœnig.

He was imprisoned in Camp 41, a prisoner-of-war camp near Parma in northern Italy, alongside Pat Gibson and Nigel Strutt. Strutt was repatriated on medical grounds, and Gibson and Tomkins were moved to another camp. He and Gibson escaped from the new camp, and spent 81 days walking 500 miles (800 km) south to Bari, crossing the Apennines and German lines, to return to Allied-held territory. He was awarded the French Croix de Guerre for his services.

He returned to the Diplomatic Service in 1944, and was posted to Moscow until 1946. He returned to Whitehall in 1948, to become Assistant Private Secretary to the Foreign Secretary, serving under Ernest Bevin and then Herbert Morrison. He was First Secretary in Washington, D.C. in 1951, then in Paris from 1955, in charge of press relations. In Paris, he met Gillian Benson, daughter of Air Commodore C.E. Benson. They married in 1955.

He was appointed CVO in 1957, and CMG in 1960. After another period in London, he was Minister in Bonn, where he befriended Claus von Amsberg (later husband of Princess and then Queen Beatrix of the Netherlands). He returned to Washington as Minister in 1967.

Advanced to KCMG in 1969, he was Head of Mission and Ambassador at The Hague from 1970 to 1972, and then replaced Christopher Soames as Ambassador to France in 1972. Agence France Presse lauded his appointment an historic breakthrough in Franco-British relations – the first fluent speaker of French and Roman Catholic to hold the position, together with a record of service with the Free French Forces in North Africa. He also spoke excellent German and Italian.

Supported by British Prime Minister Edward Heath, Tomkins took a leading role in the negotiations for Britain to join the European Economic Community in 1973. He established friendly personal and working relationships with two French presidents, Georges Pompidou and Valéry Giscard d'Estaing. He retired on leaving Paris in 1975, advanced to GCMG. He became a Grand Officier of the Légion d'honneur in 1984.

Tomkins lived at the Christopher Wren-designed Winslow Hall in Buckinghamshire. He bought the derelict and about-to-be-demolished house in 1959, and he and his wife carefully restored it. They lived there from 1975 after he retired from service. Sir Edward offered the house for sale in May 2007, four months before his death, for £3,000,000, comprising six bedroom suites, two self-contained flats and surrounded by 22 acres (8.9 ha) of land.

He was elected as a Conservative member of Buckinghamshire County Council from 1977 to 1985, and became a governor of Stowe School.

In 1955 Tomkins married Gillian Benson, a daughter of Air-Commodore Constantine Benson by his wife Lady Morvyth Benson, a daughter of William Ward, 2nd Earl of Dudley. They had three children, a son and two daughters. Lady Tomkins died in 2003.

Sir Edward Tomkins died at the age of 91 in 2007, and was survived by his three children.

Diplomatic posts
Preceded by Sir Christopher Soames	British Ambassador to France; 1972–1975	Succeeded by Sir Nicholas Henderson
