= Louis du Pan Mallet =

British diplomat

Sir Louis du Pan Mallet GCMG CB PC (10 July 1864 – 8 August 1936) was a British diplomat who was Ambassador to the Ottoman Empire at the outbreak of World War I.

== Career ==
Louis du Pan Mallet was the third son of Sir Louis Mallet, a British civil servant. He was educated at Clifton College and privately before going up to Balliol College, Oxford after which he entered the Foreign Office in 1888. He served in Brazil, Rome and Cairo before holding the posts of précis writer to the Secretary of State for Foreign Affairs, Lord Lansdowne, 1902–05 and subsequently Private Secretary to Lansdowne's successor, Sir Edward Grey, 1905–07. He was assistant Under-Secretary of State, in charge of Near and Middle Eastern affairs, 1907–13.

In 1913 Mallet was appointed Ambassador at Constantinople. "The appointment caused no little surprise, as it had been expected that it would be given to a member of the Diplomatic Corps with experience of Constantinople. Conditions in Turkey had greatly changed in the past 15 years. British influence had waned, while that of Germany had increased to the point of dominance. The Secretary of State considered it wise to have an Ambassador in Constantinople without preconceptions derived from former experience there. Mallet had wide experience of foreign politics in general; and, in Sir Edward Grey's opinion, a special knowledge of the problems to be dealt with by a British Ambassador to the Porte."

Up to July 1914, Mallet's task was not difficult. Britain and Germany had both helped with the settlement after the First Balkan War and relations with the Ottoman Empire were comfortable. But he was on leave at the outbreak of World War I when Britain confiscated two Ottoman dreadnought battleships that were being built in Britain. Shortly afterwards two German battleships, Goeben and Breslau, arrived at Constantinople. As the Ottoman Empire was still officially neutral, they and their crews were transferred to the Ottoman navy. By the time Mallet reached his post, three weeks after the outbreak of war, the question of Ottoman affiliation was practically decided, although the Allied powers continued to negotiate with the Porte until the Ottomans joined the war on the side of the Central Powers, when Mallet and other Allied ambassadors had to leave Constantinople. Mallet was criticised at the time and afterwards for failing to keep the Ottoman Empire out of the war, but Germany's influence was aided by Turkey's long-running enmity with Russia, one of the Allies. Also, Mallet could only act with the concurrence of the British, French and Russian governments, whereas the German ambassador, Wangenheim, was able to act on his own initiative.

Mallet served in the Foreign Office during the war and among other tasks was a member of a government committee on prisoners of war. He was attached to the British delegation to the Paris Peace Conference, 1919, and retired in 1920.

== Personal life ==
In 1912 Mallet acquired the dilapidated 14th century Otham Manor, then known as Wardes, having 'detected amid the ruin and squalor the possibility of restoring an exceptionally fine old timber house to something like its pristine beauty'.

== Honours ==
Louis du Pan Mallet was appointed CB in 1905, knighted KCMG in the King's Birthday Honours of 1912 and promoted GCMG in the 1915 New Year Honours. He was made a Privy Counsellor in 1913.

Diplomatic posts
Preceded by Sir Eric Barrington	Principal Private Secretary to the Foreign Secretary; 1905–1907	Succeeded by Sir William Tyrrell
Preceded by Sir Gerard Lowther	Ambassador Extraordinary and Plenipotentiary to His Imperial Majesty the Sultan of Turkey; 1913–1914	Vacant First World War Title next held by Sir Somerset Gough-Calthorpe as High Commissioner at Constantinople
