= Wellington College, Berkshire =

Private school in Crowthorne, Berkshire, England

Wellington College

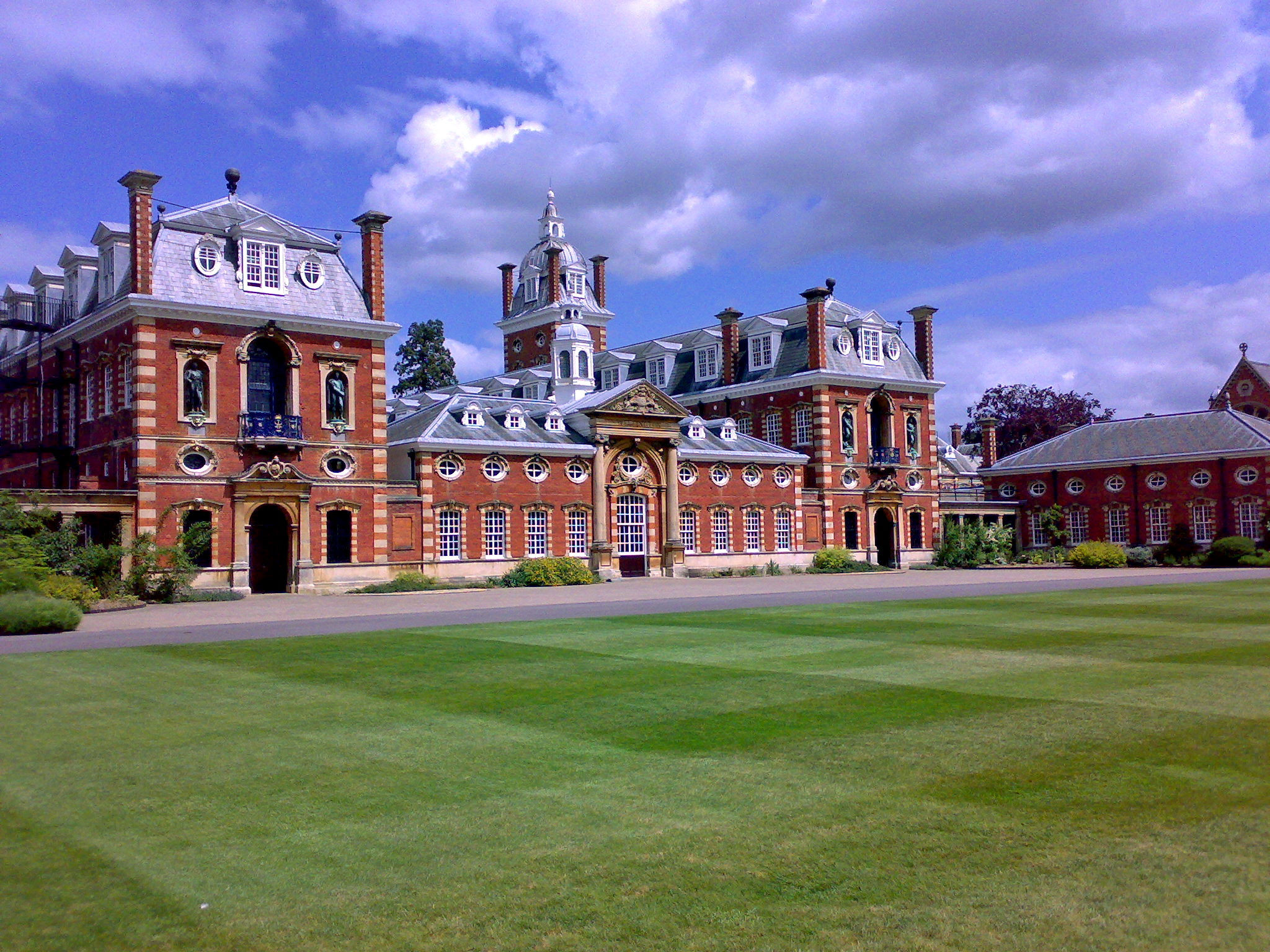

Location
- Dukes Ride; Crowthorne, Berkshire, RG45 7PU; England; 51.3643°N 0.8067°W

Information
- Type: Public school Private boarding and day school
- Motto: Virtutis Fortuna Comes ('Fortune is the companion of virtue'); Heroum Filii ('The children of heroes')
- Religious affiliation: Church of England
- Established: 1853; 173 years ago
- Founder: Queen Victoria
- Department for Education URN: 110125 Tables
- Chairman of the board of governors: William Jackson
- Master: James E. L. Dahl
- Second Master: Cressida Henderson
- Staff: 175 (approx.)
- Gender: Co-educational; The school has a 50%-50% split of girls and boys
- Age: 13 to 18
- Enrolment: 1140 pupils
- Student to teacher ratio: 6:1
- Houses: 18 (16 boarding, 2 day)
- Colours: Yellow; Light blue Orange
- Song: Heroum Filii
- Publication: The Wellingtonian
- Budget: £73,085,000 (2025)
- Revenue: £76,225,000 (2025)
- Alumni: Old Wellingtonians ("OWs")
- Campus: 400-acre (1.6 km^{2}) rural campus
- Affiliations: G30 Schools; HMC; The Rugby Group
- Website: www.wellingtoncollege.org.uk

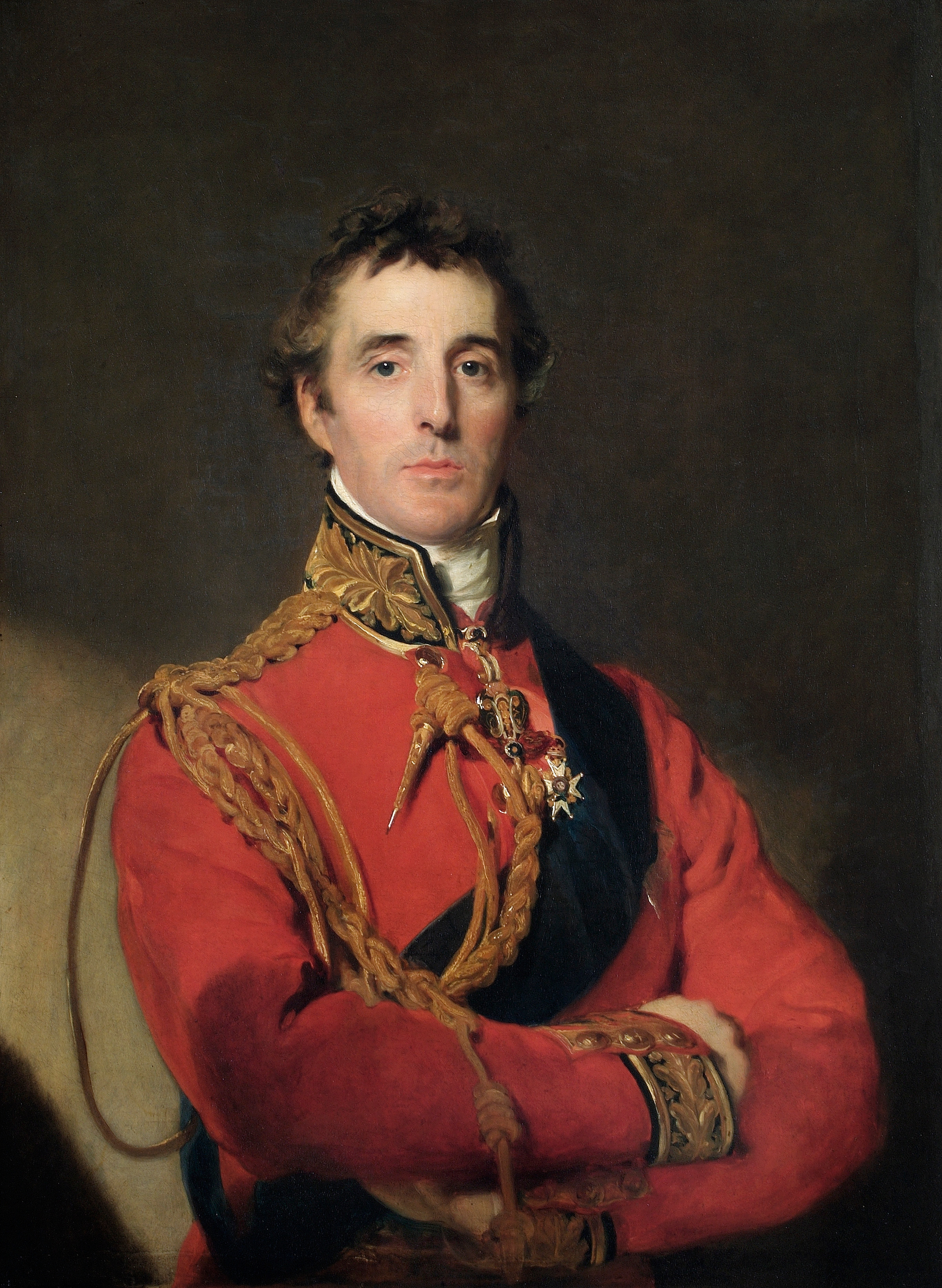
The first Duke of Wellington, Sir Arthur Wellesley, after whom the College was named

Wellington College is a co-educational public school providing education for boarding and day pupils in the village of Crowthorne, in Berkshire, in the United Kingdom. Wellington is a registered charity and currently educates roughly 1,100 pupils aged between 13 and 18. The college was built as a national monument to the military victory against Napoleon, and the political service as British Prime Minister, of the first Duke of Wellington, in whose honour it is named. It was established by Royal Charter in 1853. Queen Victoria laid the foundation stone in 1856, and inaugurated the school's public opening on 29 January 1859.

Many former Wellington pupils fought in the First World War, with a large number volunteering for military service immediately after leaving school. In all, 707 Wellington old boys lost their lives in the conflict; and according to its website, due to its strong connection with military families, a total of more than 1200 former pupils were killed in action in the two world wars.

The school is a member of the Rugby Group of 18 British public schools and is also a member of the G30 Schools group. For the academic year 2025/26, Wellington will charge boarders up to £20,750 per term (including VAT) and day pupils £15,250 per term (including VAT).

In March 2023, the school was awarded Artsmark Platinum by the Arts Council England. Since 2020, the school has continuously been listed by The Schools Index as one of the world's leading 150 schools and one of the top 30 UK senior schools.

== History ==
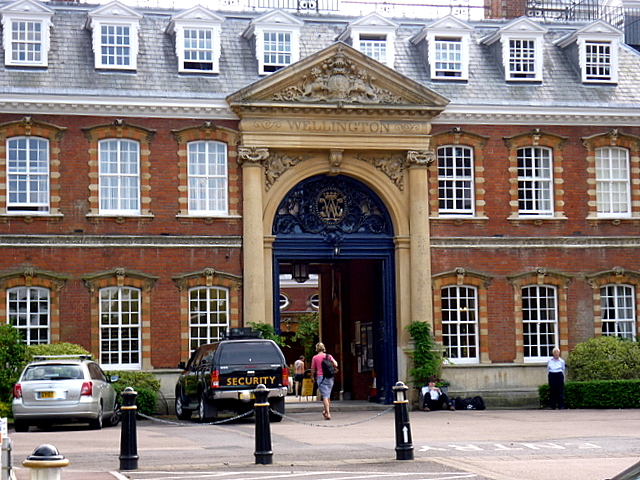
The Great Gate of Wellington College, the entrance to the Front Quad (courtyard) of the main building

Wellington College was granted a royal charter in 1853 as The Royal and Religious Foundation of the Wellington College, and was opened in 1859. Its first Master, which is the title of the headmaster, was Edward White Benson, who later became Archbishop of Canterbury. The college's Visitor was Queen Elizabeth II.

Originally, the school educated sons of deceased officers who had held commissions in the Army. In 1952 a Supplementary Royal Charter extended the privilege of eligibility to the orphan sons of deceased officers of the Royal Navy, Royal Marines and Royal Air Force. By the 1960s, the school was considering becoming co-educational, but for some years a lack of financial resources prevented it from doing so. The first nine girls were admitted into the Sixth Form in the 1975, and the school became fully co-educational in 2005. A recent change to the scheme of reduced fees early in 2006 extended the privilege to the orphan children of deceased servicemen or servicewomen of His Majesty's Armed Forces irrespective of rank, and to the orphan children of persons who, in the sole opinion of the Governors, have died in acts of selfless bravery. However, only a minority of the children at the school now come from military families.

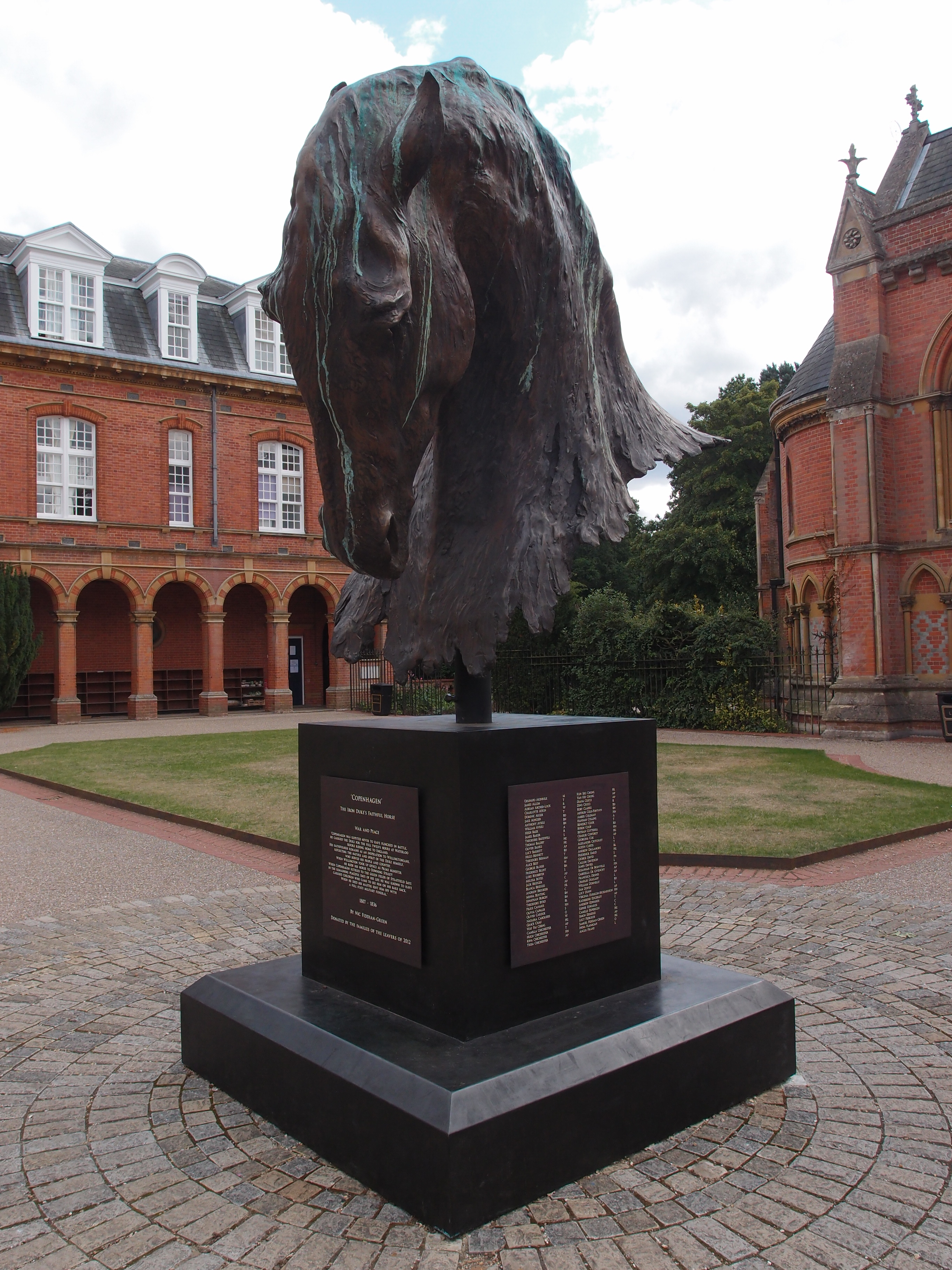
The Wellington College Memorial, featuring a modern sculpture of the head of Copenhagen, the Duke of Wellington's war horse

On 6 September 2013, readers of The Week magazine voted Wellington College "The Most Forward-Thinking School in the UK", and four days later Tatler magazine chose Wellington College as the "Best Senior School in Britain", at its Schools Awards evening in London. In 2024, Wellington College was again featured in Tatler magazine, with the Master, James Dahl, being nominated for "Best Head of a Public School".

From the commencement of the 2025-26 academic year, Wellington College became 50%-50% split between boys and girls, and in the same year it celebrated 50 years of co-education.

== 'Wellbeing' classes ==
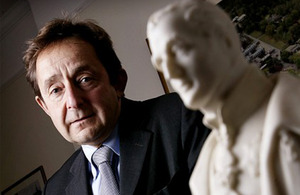
Sir Anthony Seldon, the co-founder of Action for Happiness, emphasises the need to ensure pupils' wellbeing, and as Master of Wellington College (2006–2015), implemented classes in the subject.

Following reports, in the early 2000s, that some pupils at Wellington College had been subjected to bullying, the then-new Master of the College, Sir Anthony Seldon, an author and historian, introduced 'wellbeing' classes to the curriculum, in conjunction with a team at the University of Cambridge. He felt that it was important to help his pupils find the best ways to be happy, and explained the reasons for introducing the subject to the curriculum.

=== The Wellington Academy ===
Wellington has sponsored the founding of a new independent state school in Wiltshire, The Wellington Academy, which opened in 2009, at the instigation of the former Master of the College, Sir Anthony Seldon.

=== Wellington College International ===
Wellington is in partnership with Wellington College International Tianjin, in the city of Tianjin in mainland China, modelled on the buildings and ethos of the college, and which opened in August 2011. Wellington is also partnered with Wellington College International Shanghai and Huili School Shanghai in the city of Shanghai, and Wellington College International Hangzhou and Huili School Hangzhou in the city of Hangzhou (also in mainland China), Wellington College International Bangkok in Thailand, and Wellington College International Pune in India.

== Architecture ==
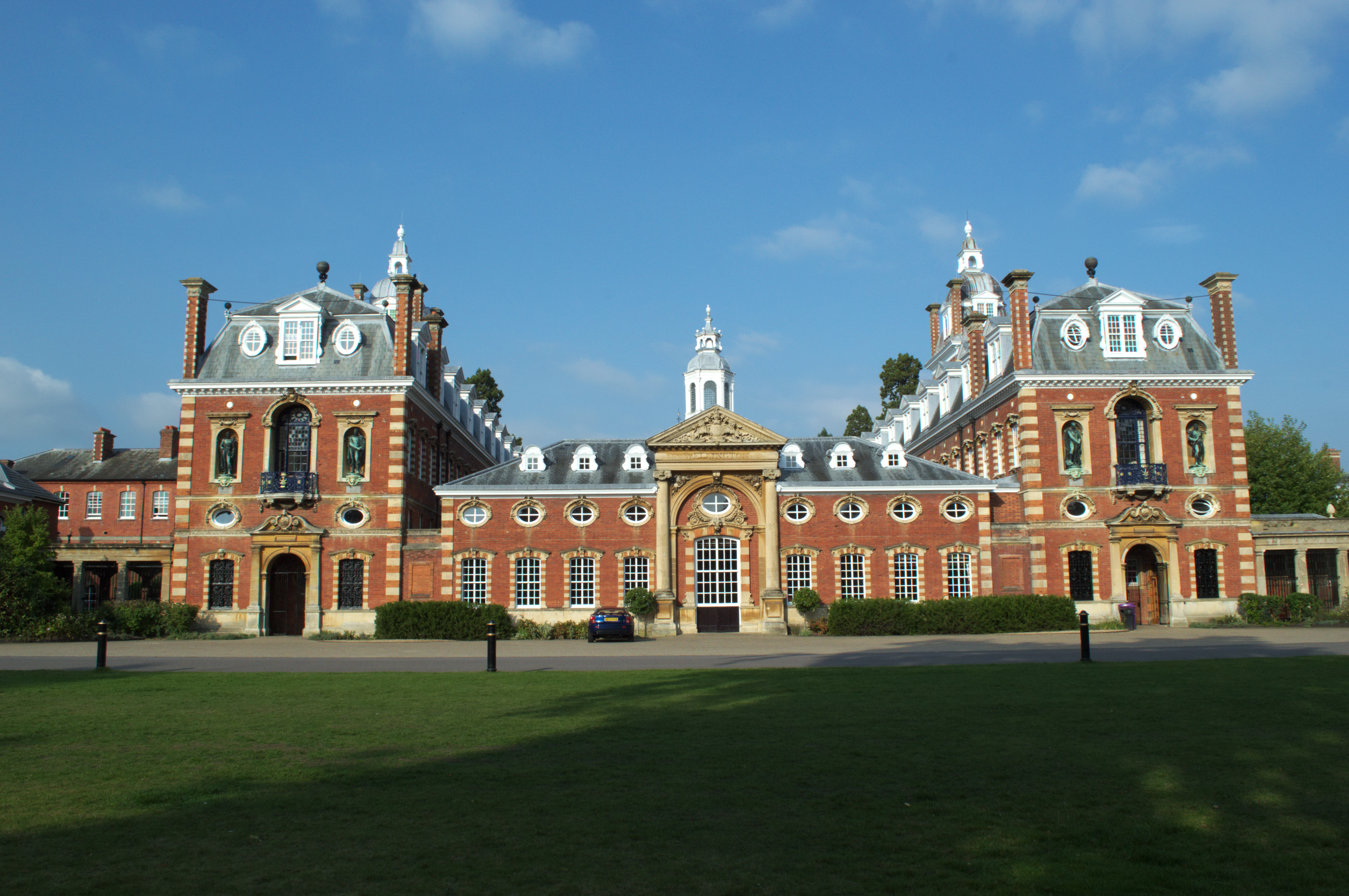
The front-facing exterior of the College, designed by John Shaw, Junior

The college buildings were designed by John Shaw, Jr., who had previously worked as an architect for Eton College. For its time, the design of the College was unusual compared to the popular form, but Prince Albert, who assisted in choosing the architect, was more interested in Shaw's classical approach, having already seen the architect's design for the old Royal Naval School in New Cross, London. The main buildings were designed in a style loosely termed "French Grand Rococo".

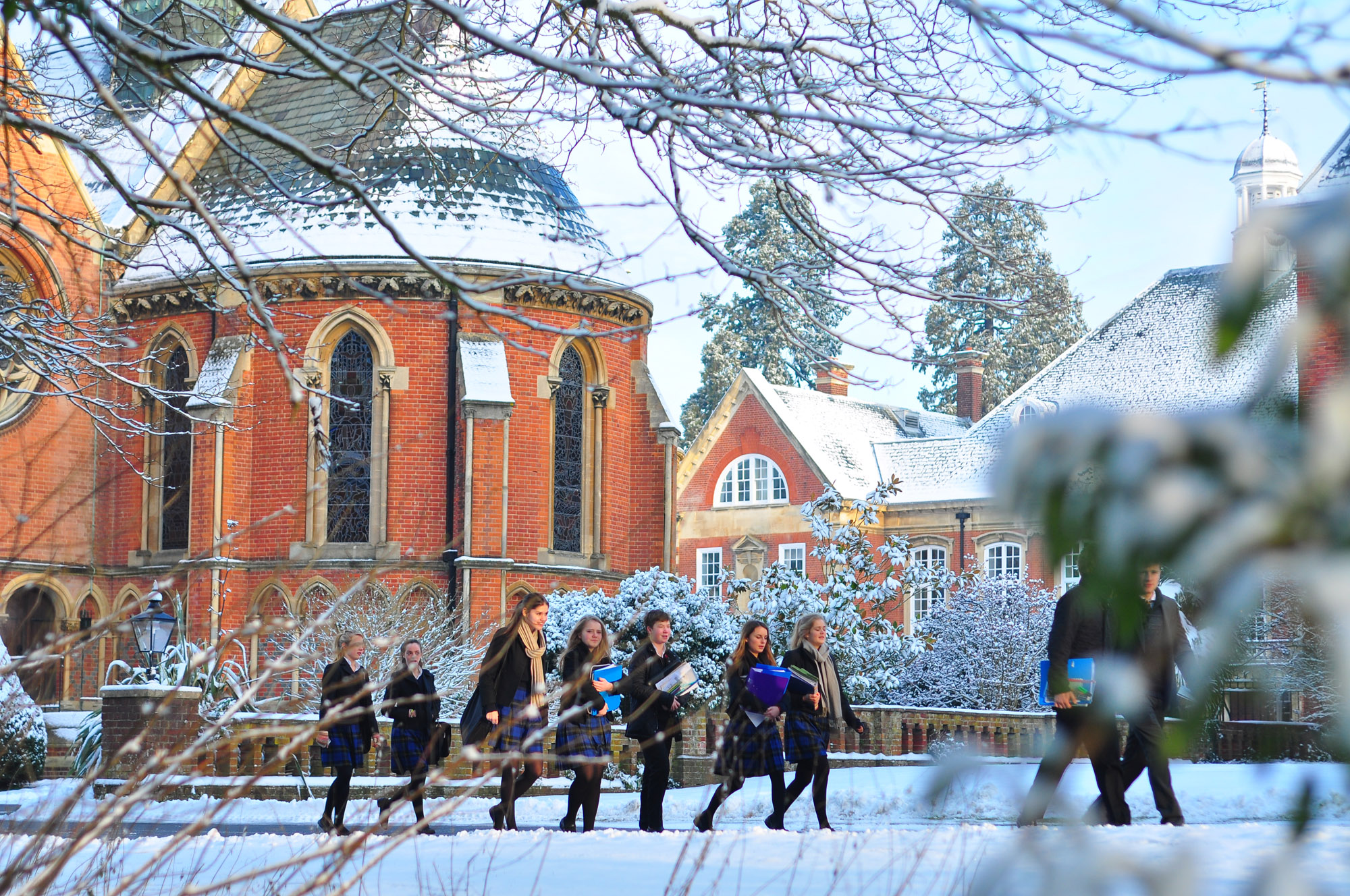
The Chapel, designed by Sir George Gilbert Scott, in the winter

The chapel, only half its originally intended size, was designed by Sir George Gilbert Scott. There have been several modern buildings, the best of which follow Shaw's grand rococo style: for example, the new Nicholson modern foreign-languages building. In 2019 the GWA Performing Arts Centre was opened, housing an auditorium with 900 seats for use by pupils and to raise funds for the Wellington College Arts Fund.

The college was used as a filming location for the Netflix series The Crown as a stand-in for Kensington Palace (designed by Sir Christopher Wren) in seasons 2, 3, 4 and 5 first as the home of Princess Margaret and then of Diana, Princess of Wales. One of the college's original mottos Heroum Filii is visible in a scene of the Queen arriving at the palace, and the college's official motto, Virtutis Fortuna Comes, is visible in a scene of the Queen leaving the palace.

== Location ==
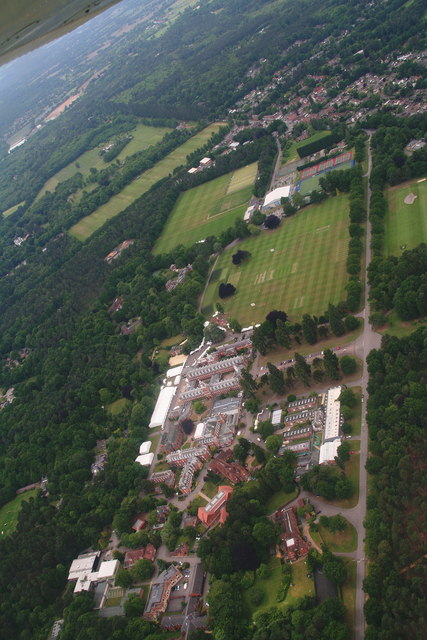
An aerial view of the College, showing part of its estate and surrounding area

Wellington College stands on a 400-acre (160 ha) estate in South-East England, near Reading and Sandhurst. The grounds of the college include two theatres, a 9-hole golf course, a science block, a language learning centre, extensive woodland, an indoor swimming pool and games courts, and many playing fields, particularly those for cricket and rugby.

The grounds include a separate Mandarin language centre, with a pagoda and Chinese water garden. The centre is believed to be the largest of its kind in the UK.

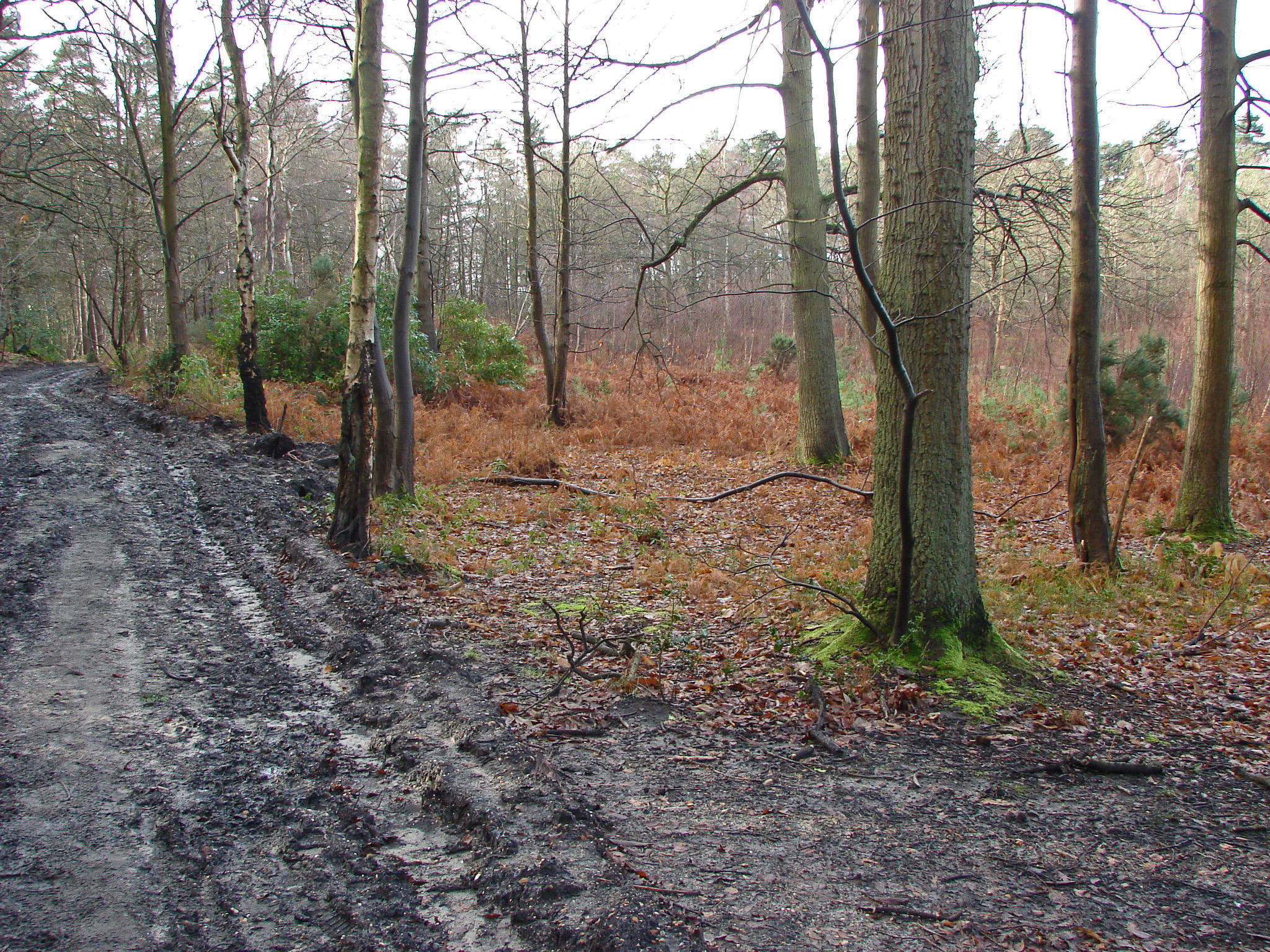
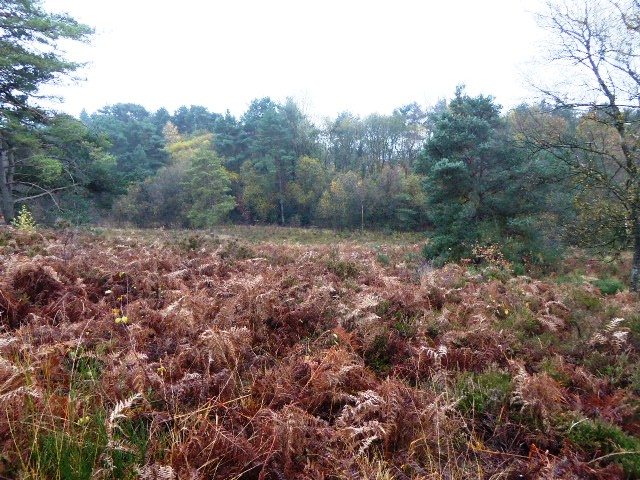
From left, the College's 91-acre local nature reserve at Edgbarrow Woods, and its 15-acre Site of Special Scientific Interest (SSSI) at Wellington College Bog, both near Sandhurst

The woodland area of the college is listed as a local nature reserve called Edgbarrow Woods. The grounds also contain a Site of Special Scientific Interest (SSSI), known as Wellington College Bog.

== Academic results ==
In 2025, at A-level, 26.2% of grades were A* and 58.7% were A*/A. Twelve pupils secured at least three A* grades. At GCSE, 9 was the most common grade, with 41.8% of all grades awarded at that level. 68.3% of grades were either 8 or 9 and 86.7% 9-7.

== Sport ==
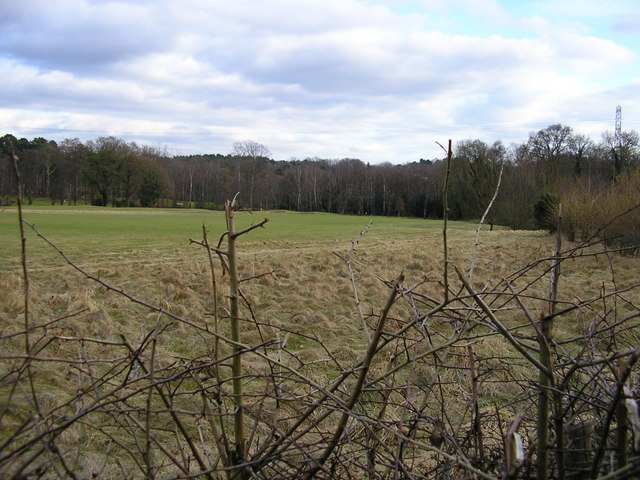
The College's onsite 9-hole Golf Course

Wellington College was one of the 21 founding members of the Rugby Football Union, and pupils at the school have historically played schoolboy rugby to the highest standard. In 2008, the College became the first school to win the Daily Mail Cup at both U15 and U18 level in the same year, beating Millfield School and St Benedict's School, Ealing in their respective finals at Twickenham on 2 April 2008.

A number of Old Wellingtonians play professional rugby union, including: James Haskell (England), Paul Doran-Jones (England), Max Lahiff (Bath Rugby and Bristol Bears), brothers Max Evans and Thom Evans (Scotland), Sam Aspland-Robinson (Harlequins), Rory Brand (London Irish), who was the College's first recipient of the Jimmy Higham Scholarship, and Madison Hughes (USA 7s).

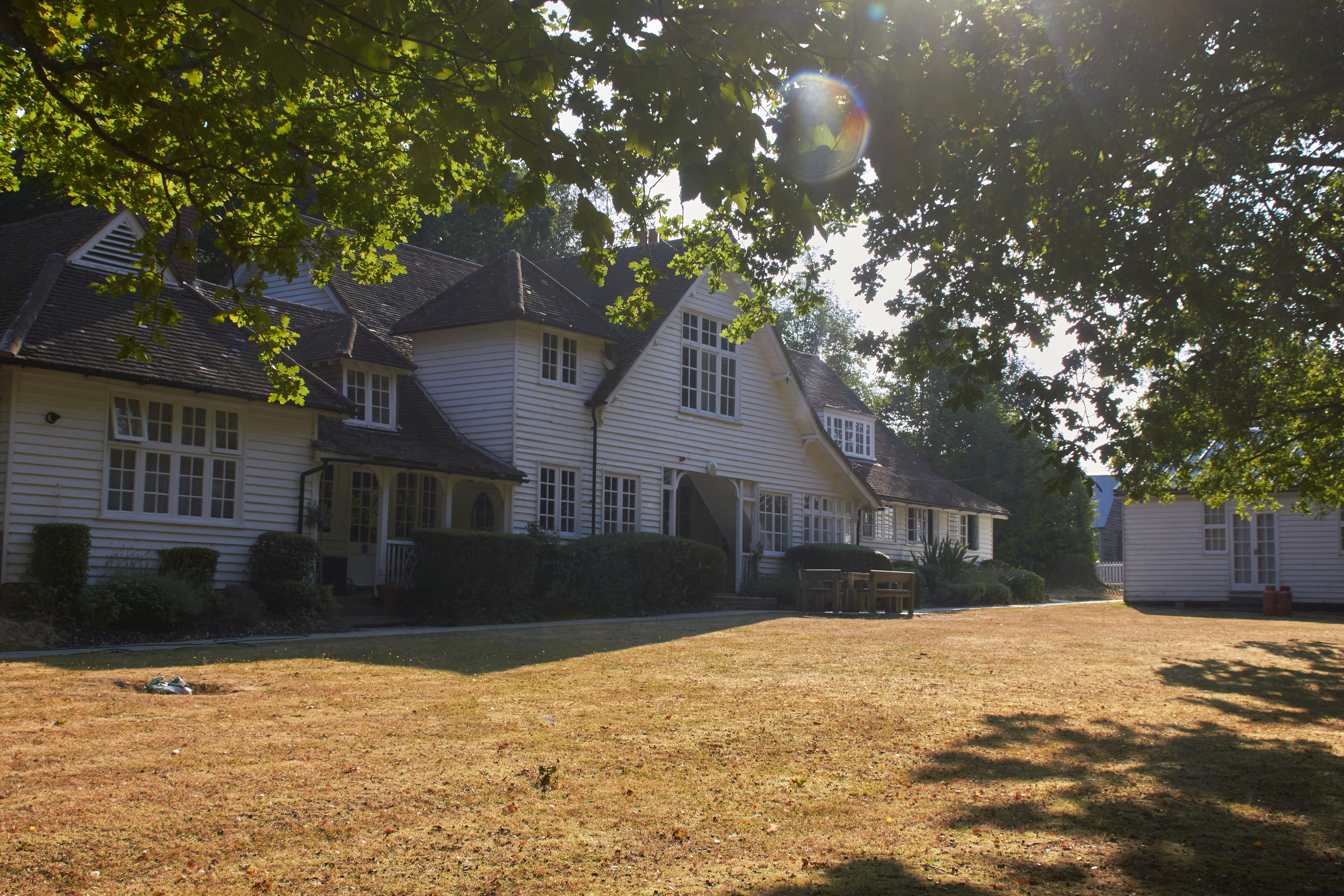
The College's Inns of Court House at the National Shooting Centre at Bisley Camp in Surrey, for use by its cadet corp during shooting competitions

The school has one of only around 20 racquets courts in the UK, one of 27 real tennis courts in the UK and until 2005 three Eton Fives courts, now a café bar as part of the sports club.

== Masters of Wellington College ==
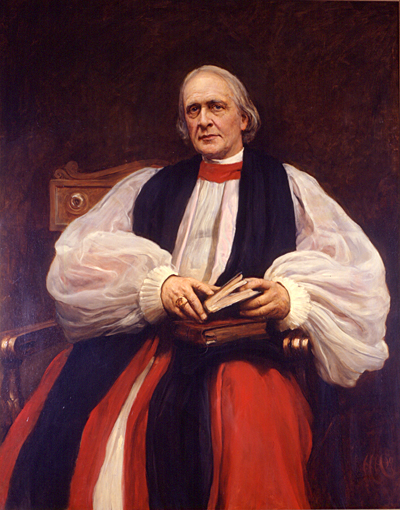
The first Master, E. W. Benson (from 1859 to 1873), by Hubert von Herkomer.

- Since 2019 James E. L. Dahl
- 2015 – 2019 Julian P. Thomas
- 2006 – 2015 Sir Anthony Francis Seldon
- 2000 – 2005 A. Hugh Monro
- 1989 – 2000 Charles Jonathan "Jonty" Driver
- 1979 – 1989 David H. Newsome
- 1966 – 1979 Frank Forman Fisher
- 1956 – 1966 Graham Henry Stainforth
- 1941 – 1956 Harry Wilfred House
- 1937 – 1940 Robert "Bobby" Paton Longden (killed at the College in a bombing raid)
- 1921 – 1937 Frederick Blagden Malim
- 1910 – 1921 William Wyamar Vaughan
- 1893 – 1910 Bertram Pollock
- 1873 – 1893 Edward C. Wickham
- 1859 – 1873 Edward White Benson

== Notable former pupils ==
- Historian P. J. Marshall
- Field marshal Sir Claude Auchinleck
- Field marshal Sir Geoffrey Baker
- Squadron leader Roger Bushell (1910–1944), mastermind of the "Great Escape"
- Military historian Sir Michael Howard
- Clergyman and author David Watson
- Architect Sir Nicholas Grimshaw
- Impressionist Rory Bremner
- Politician Hammad Azhar
- Adolphus Cambridge, 1st Marquess of Cambridge
- Theravāda Buddhist monk Ñāṇavīra Thera (born Harold Edward Musson)
- Author Sebastian Faulks
- Businessman Gerald Mordaunt Broome Salmon
- Playwright Hugh Salmon
- Language school pioneer John Haycraft
- Political journalist Robin Oakley
- Actor Sir Christopher Lee
- Liberal politician George Ferguson who became the first elected Mayor of Bristol (2012–2016)
- Writer George Orwell (Easter Term 1917 only; in May 1917 he became a King's Scholar at Eton)
- Poet Gavin Ewart
- Composer John Gardner
- World champion motor racing driver James Hunt
- Rugby union player and first-class cricketer Simon Clarke
- Former Leader of the House of Lords Lord Strathclyde
- Journalist and television presenter, Peter Snow
- The UK Pop Idol winner Will Young
- Revenge actor Josh Bowman
- BRIT Award-nominated singer, Nerina Pallot
- Rugby Union players, James Haskell and the brothers Max and Thom Evans
- Actor Robert Morley
- Actress Caggie Dunlop
- Actress Elize du Toit
- Actress Ellie Bamber
- Olympic athlete Morgan Lake
- Michael Knatchbull, 5th Baron Brabourne
- Soros family
- Getty family
- de Betak family
- de Givenchy family
- Prince Christian Victor of Schleswig-Holstein
- Prince Maurice of Battenberg
- Alexander Mountbatten, 1st Marquess of Carisbrooke
- Count Nikolai Tolstoy
- Princess Maria-Olympia of Greece and Denmark
- Prince Constantine Alexios of Greece and Denmark
- Prince Achileas-Andreas of Greece and Denmark
- Formula One Engineer Patrick Head
- Cricketer Tom Curran
- Cricketer Sam Curran

== Response to 'cartel' reports ==
In 2005 the school was one of fifty of the country's leading independent schools found guilty of running an illegal price-fixing cartel, exposed by The Times newspaper, which had allowed them to drive up fees for thousands of parents. Each school was required to pay a nominal penalty of £10,000 and all agreed to make ex-gratia payments totalling three million pounds into a trust designed to benefit pupils who attended the schools during the period in respect of which fee information was shared.

However, Jean Scott, the then-head of the Independent Schools Council, said that independent schools had always been exempt from anti-cartel rules applied to business, were following a long-established procedure in sharing the information with each other, and were unaware of the change in the law (on which they had not been consulted). She wrote to John Vickers, the OFT director-general, saying, "They are not a group of businessmen meeting behind closed doors to fix the price of their products to the disadvantage of the consumer. They are schools that have quite openly continued to follow a long-established practice because they were unaware that the law had changed."

== Houses ==
There are 18 houses at Wellington. The majority are composed of boarders with a small number of day pupils also, although two, Wellesley and Raglan, are day-pupil exclusive. Each house is either an 'in-house' or an 'out-house': in-houses are located within the main school buildings and quads while out-houses are located elsewhere on the college grounds. Each house has aspects distinguishing it from other houses, such as its own colours, insignia, and crest (with the crest of each house being incorporated into one of each of the stained glass windows of the college chapel). Each house was named in honour of a significant figure in history, usually although not exclusively figures associated with the Duke of Wellington.

House	Colours	Insignia	Gender	Boarding or Day	Named after
Anglesey	Maroon and Blue	A Star	F	Boarding	Henry Paget, 1st Marquess of Anglesey
Apsley	Blue and Black	A Pineapple	F	Boarding	Apsley House
Benson	Blue and Silver	A Rose	M	Boarding	Edward White Benson
Beresford	Medium Blue and Black	A Horseshoe	M	Boarding	William Beresford, 1st Viscount Beresford
Blücher	Black and White	A Fleur-de-lis	M	Boarding	Gebhard Leberecht von Blücher, Prince of Wahlstatt
Combermere	Gold and Brown	A Lion	F	Boarding	Stapleton Cotton, 1st Viscount Combermere
Elizabeth	Gold and Red	A Crown	M & F	Boarding (Sixth Form only)	Elizabeth II
Hardinge	Green and Brown	An Anchor	F	Boarding (No Third Form)	Henry Hardinge, 1st Viscount Hardinge
Hill	Purple and White	A Skull and Crossbones	M	Boarding	Rowland Hill, 1st Viscount Hill
Hopetoun	Yellow and Blue	A Moon and Star	F	Boarding	John Hope, 4th Earl of Hopetoun
Lynedoch	Navy Blue and Black	An Iron Cross	M	Boarding	Thomas Graham, 1st Baron Lynedoch
Murray	Purple and Black	A Moon	M	Boarding	Sir George Murray
Orange	Orange and Black	A Double-headed Eagle	F	Boarding	William, Prince of Orange, later William II of the Netherlands
Picton	Pink and Brown	An Eagle	M	Boarding	Sir Thomas Picton
Raglan	Red and Grey	A Panther	M	Day	FitzRoy Somerset, 1st Baron Raglan
Stanley	Maroon and Light Blue	A Unicorn	M	Boarding	Edward Smith-Stanley, 14th Earl of Derby
Talbot	Maroon and White	A Maltese Cross	F	Boarding	Sir Wellington Patrick Talbot
Wellesley	Pink and White	A Pelican	F	Day	Arthur Wellesley, 2nd Duke of Wellington

The Orange, Combermere, Hopetoun, Anglesey and Talbot were all formerly boys' houses but converted to girls' houses between 2005 and 2025 in order to transition the school towards a 50%-50% gender split.

== The Old Wellingtonian Society ==
The Old Wellingtonian Society is the alumni society for the college and was founded in 1890. The Old Wellingtonian Society was set up to further the interests of the college and its past and present members, and to keep former pupils in touch with each other and with the school.

== See also ==
- List of notable Old Wellingtonians
- Category:People educated at Wellington College, Berkshire
- Wellington College International Shanghai, a subsidiary school in China
- Wellington College International Tianjin, a subsidiary school in China
