= Robin Oakley =

British journalist

Robin Oakley OBE
- Born: Robert Francis Leigh Oakley; 20 August 1941 (age 84); Kidderminster, England
- Occupations: Journalist; broadcaster
- Title: Political editor of BBC News (1992–2000); European political editor of CNN International (2000–2008)

Signature
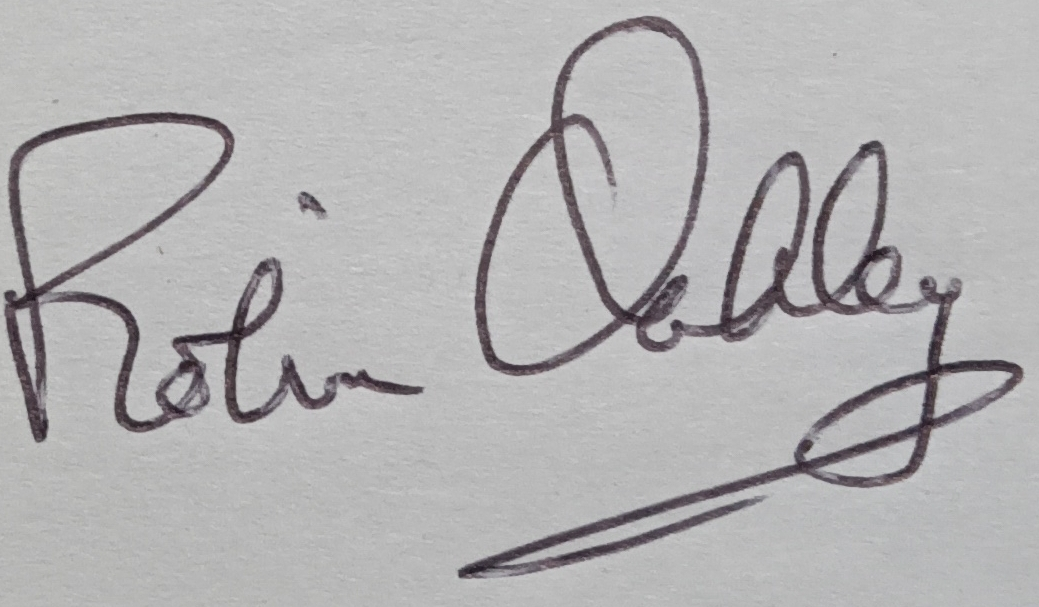

Robert Francis Leigh Oakley OBE (born 20 August 1941) is a British journalist and writer. From 1992 to 2000 he was political editor at the BBC and from 2000 to 2008 he was European political editor at CNN International.

== Early life ==
Born in Kidderminster, Worcestershire, Oakley grew up in Esher, Surrey. He was educated at Wellington College, Berkshire, and Brasenose College, Oxford.

== Career ==
He started his career on the Liverpool Daily Post where he became political editor. He was then a columnist and political editor on The Sunday Express and was assistant editor of the Daily Mail from 1981 to 1986. Between 1986 and 1992, he was a columnist and political editor for The Times. In 1992, he moved to the BBC, where he was political editor. He was succeeded as political editor in summer 2000 by Andrew Marr, despite having hoped to remain at the BBC to cover the upcoming general election. After leaving the BBC, Oakley became CNN International's European political editor.

Oakley also has an interest in horse racing, and has written the Turf column in The Spectator since 1994, as well as being the racing correspondent of the Financial Times for several years. He has written a number of books about racing.

== Honours ==
Oakley was awarded an Order of the British Empire in 2001 for his services to political journalism.

== Bibliography ==
- Oakley, Robin (2000). Valley of the Racehorse. Headline Publishing Group. ISBN 978-0747217831.
- — (2001). Inside Track. Transworld Publishers Limited. ISBN 978-0552148818.
- — (2010). Frankincense and More: The Biography of Barry Hills. Racing Post Books. ISBN 978-1-905156-79-5.
- — (2011). The Cheltenham Festival: A Centenary History. Aurum. ISBN 978 1 845136369.
- — (2012). Britain and Ireland's Top 100 Racehorses Of All Time. Icon Books. ISBN 978-1-908216-22-9.
- — (2012). Clive Brittain: The Smiling Pioneer. Racing Post Books. ISBN 978-190685-042-5.
- — (2013). Tales From The Turf: Reflections from a Life in Horseracing. Icon Books. ISBN 978-190685-066-1.
- Oakley, Robin (with Edward Gillespie) (2017). Sixty Years of Jump Racing: From Arkle to McCoy. Bloomsbury Sport. ISBN 978-1-4729-3509-0.

Media offices
Preceded by John Cole	Political editor of BBC News; 1992–2000	Succeeded by Andrew Marr
Preceded by	European political editor of CNN International; 2000–2008	Succeeded by
