= Qiantan International Business Zone (Shanghai) =

Financial district of Shanghai, China

Coordinates: 31.1622°N 121.4734°E

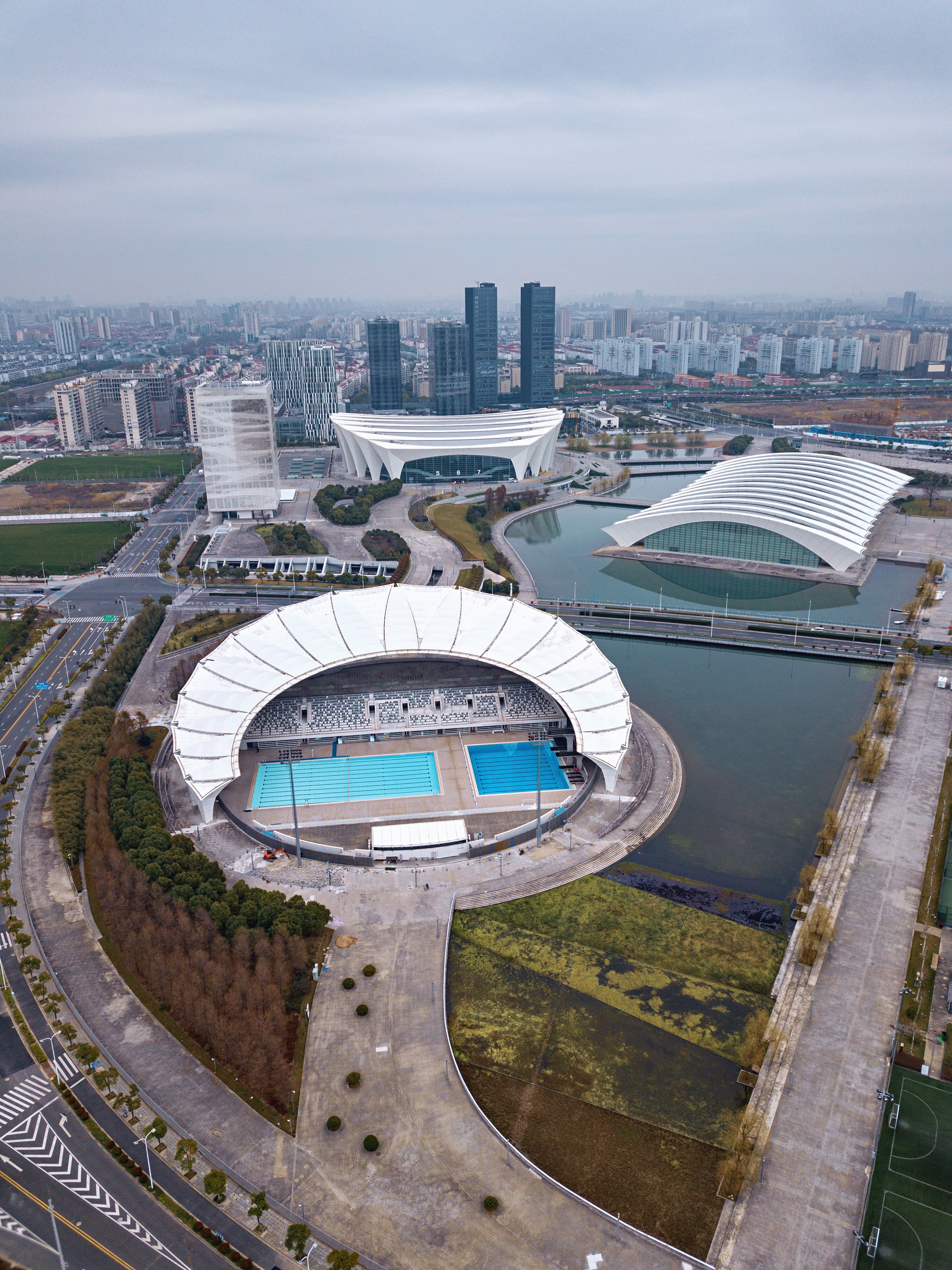

Location
- Qiantan, Pudong, Shanghai

Area
- 2.83Km2

Built
- November, 2012–Present

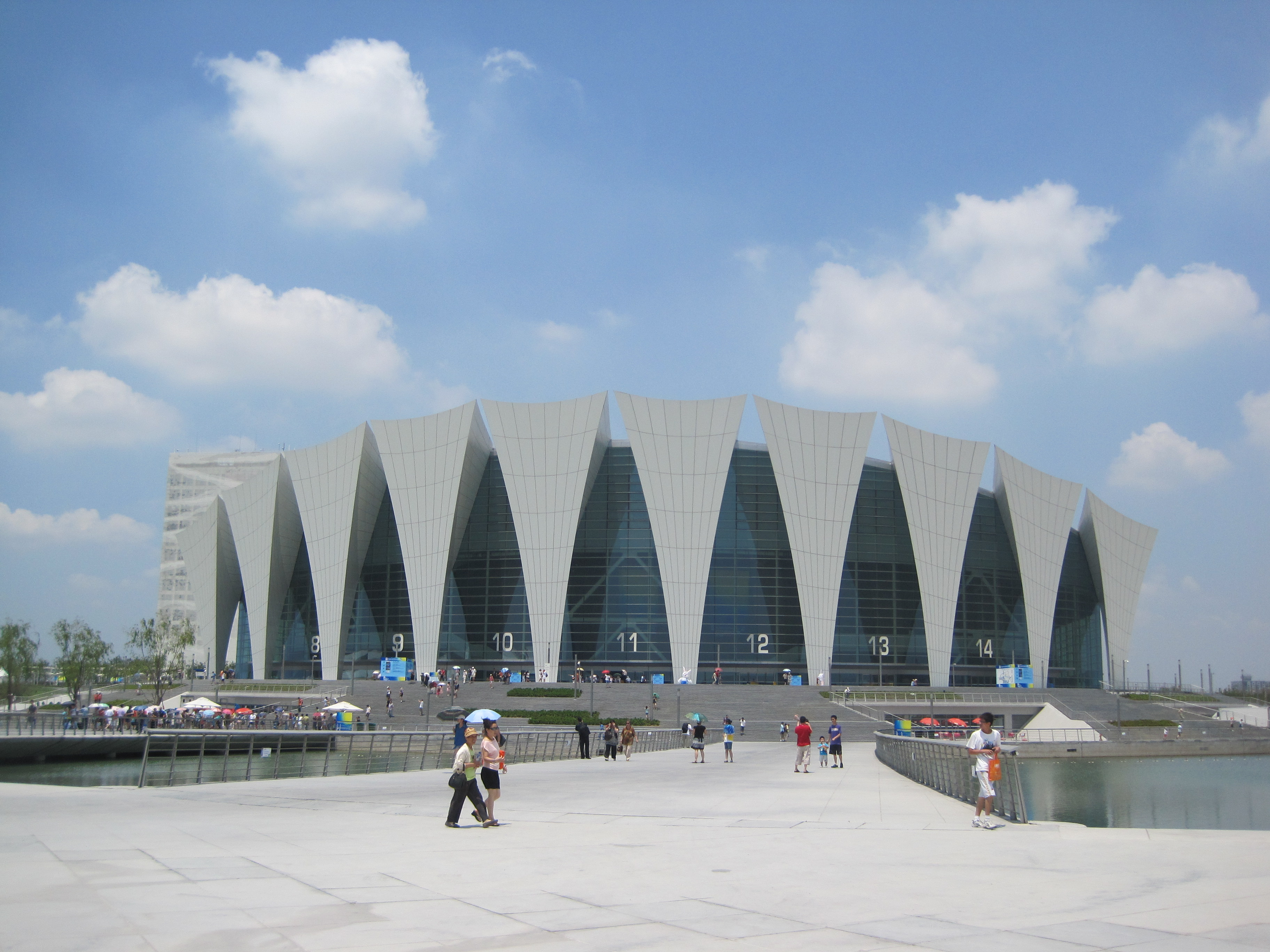
Shanghai Oriental Sports Center in Qian tan

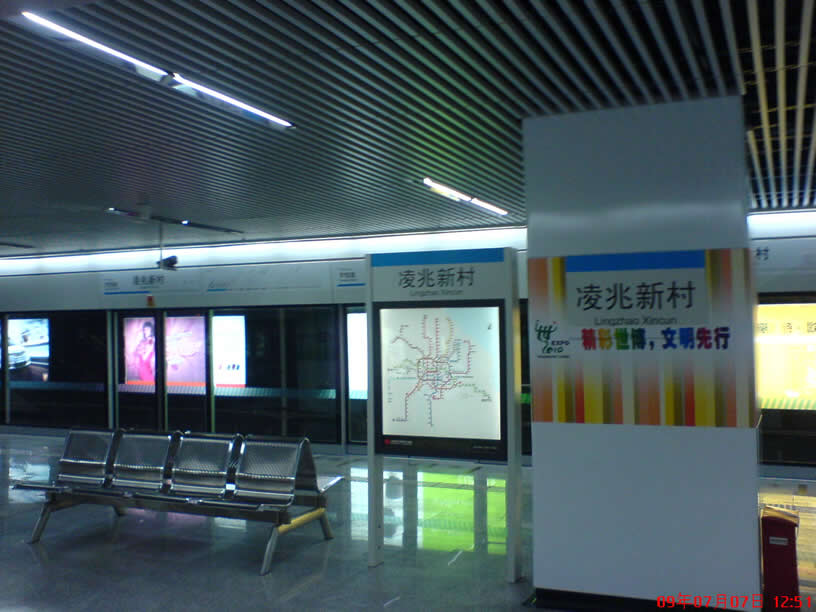
Lingzhao Xincun Station on Line 8 of the Shanghai Metro near Qian Tan

Qiantan International Business Zone (Shanghai) (simplified Chinese: 上海前滩国际商务区; traditional Chinese: 上海前灘國際商務區; pinyin: Shànghǎi Qiántān Guójì Shāngwùqū) also called the New Bund, is a newly built International Business Zone in Qiantan, Pudong, Shanghai, China, lying to the south of the former Expo 2010 site next to the Shanghai Oriental Sports Center. It is known as Shanghai's "second Lujiazui" as the Secondary Central business district developing close to Lujiazui. It will be developed specifically as another new financial district of Shanghai, but will focus more on overall urban functionality.

By the end of May 2024, the municipal infrastructure in the Qiantan International Business Zone had been completed, including 15.5 kilometers of roads, the renovation of 1.55 kilometers of waterways, and nearly one million square meters of green space.

== See also ==
- Lujiazui
- The Bund
- Xintiandi
- Zhangjiang Hi-Tech Park
