= List of international official trips made by Elizabeth II =

International official trips made by Elizabeth II may refer to:

- Outward state visits made by Elizabeth II
- Commonwealth visits made by Elizabeth II
