= Simon Clarke (rugby union) =

English cricketer and rugby union footballer

- Born: Simon John Scott Clarke; 2 April 1938 Westcliff-on-Sea, Essex; England
- Died: 12 October 2017 (aged 79)

Rugby union career
- Position: Scrum-half
International career
Years	Team	Apps	(Points)
1963–1965	England	13	(3)

Simon John Scott Clarke (2 April 1938 – 12 October 2017) was an English rugby union footballer who played internationally for England. He also played first-class cricket.

Clarke, a scrum-half, made his Test debut in the 1963 Five Nations Championship. He appeared in all four fixtures, to help England claim their 17th title. Soon after, he took part in England's 1963 tour of Australasia. He played two Tests against New Zealand and one against Australia in Sydney, scoring the only try of his career in the latter. The following year, New Zealand toured England and Clarke played a Test against the All Blacks at Twickenham. He played the remaining five Tests of his career during both the 1964 and 1965 Five Nations Championships.

A right-handed batsman, Clarke got his first taste of first-class cricket in 1958 when he played for a Combined Services team against Lancashire. He made further first-class appearances in 1961 and 1962, for Cambridge University. In 14 first-class innings he amassed a total of only 99 runs, with a highest score of just 19.
