= List of knights and dames grand cross of the Order of St Michael and St George =

Below is a list of knights and dames grand cross of the Order of St Michael and St George.

- This indicates that the appointment was honorary.
- An asterisk (*) indicates a dame grand cross.

== George III (Regency) ==
| Appointment | Name | Notes |
|---|---|---|
| 27 April 1818 | Lieutenant-General Sir Thomas Maitland | Grand Master 1818–1824, Governor of Malta and Lord High Commissioner of the Ionian islands |
| 18 November 1818 | Baron Emmanuel Theotokis (as Emanuel, Baron Theotoky) | President of the Ionian Senate |
| 18 November 1818 | Stamo Calichiopulo | Senator of the Ionian Islands |
| 18 November 1818 | Count Antonio Comuto | Former President of the Ionian Senate |
| 16 December 1818 | Vice-Admiral Sir Charles Vinicombe Penrose | Naval Commander-in-Chief in the Mediterranean |
| 16 December 1818 | Giuseppe Borg Olivier | President of the Court of Appeal of Malta |
| 16 December 1818 | Raffaele Crispino Xerri | Member of the Supreme Council of Justice of Malta |
| 26 October 1819 | Vice-Admiral Sir Thomas Francis Fremantle | Naval Commander-in-Chief in the Mediterranean |
| 26 October 1819 | Frederick North, 5th Earl of Guilford | Chancellor of the Ionian Academy |

== George IV ==
| Appointment | Name | Notes |
|---|---|---|
| 28 September 1820 | Admiral Sir Graham Moore | Naval Commander-in-Chief in the Mediterranean |
| 27 September 1821 | Sir Frederick Adam | Officer of the troops in the Ionian Islands |
| 1 March 1823 | Count Nicolo Annino | Senator of the Ionian Islands |
| 16 January 1824 | Admiral Sir Harry Burrard-Neale, Bart. | Naval Commander-in-Chief in the Mediterranean |
| 20 June 1825 | Field Marshal Prince Adolphus Frederick, Duke of Cambridge | Grand Master 1825–1850 |
| 30 July 1825 | Marino Veja | President of the Ionian Senate |
| 23 April 1827 | Admiral Sir Edward Codrington | Naval Commander-in-Chief in the Mediterranean |
| 5 November 1828 | Major-General The Honourable Sir Frederick Cavendish Ponsonby | Lieutenant-Governor of Malta |
| 21 January 1829 | Admiral Sir Pulteney Malcolm | Naval Commander-in-Chief in the Mediterranean |

== William IV ==
| Appointment | Name | Notes |
|---|---|---|
| 4 July 1831 | Vice-Admiral The Honourable Sir Henry Hotham | Naval Commander-in-Chief in the Mediterranean |
| 28 May 1832 | Giuseppe Calcédonio Debono | Member of the Supreme Council of Justice of Malta |
| 6 June 1832 | Giovanni Cappadoca | Member of the Supreme Council of Justice of Malta |
| 6 June 1832 | Angiolo Condari | Senator of the Ionian Islands |
| 22 June 1832 | Sir James Macdonald, Bart. | Lord High Commissioner of the Ionian Islands, died before investiture |
| 30 June 1832 | Lieutenant-General Sir Alexander George Woodford | Commander of the Forces in the Ionian Islands |
| 12 August 1832 | George Nugent-Grenville, 2nd Baron Nugent | Lord High Commissioner of the Ionian Islands |
| 4 May 1833 | Sir Frederick Hankey | Chief Secretary to the Governor of Malta |
| 26 June 1833 | Rear-Admiral Sir Thomas Briggs | Superintendent of the dockyard at Malta |
| 17 July 1833 | Spiridion Vittor, Count Bulgari | President of the Ionian Senate |
| 22 February 1834 | Admiral Sir Josias Rowley, Bart. | Naval Commander-in-Chief in the Mediterranean |
| 18 March 1835 | Lieutenant-General Sir Howard Douglas, Bart. | Lord High Commissioner of the Ionian Islands |
| 2 April 1836 | Paolo, Count Parisio | Lord-Lieutenant of Malta |
| 28 September 1836 | Lieutenant-General Sir Henry Frederick Bouverie | Governor of Malta |
| 10 May 1837 | General Henry Pigot | |
| 10 May 1837 | General Thomas Graham, 1st Baron Lynedoch | |
| 10 May 1837 | Admiral The Honourable Robert Stopford | Naval Commander-in-Chief in the Mediterranean |
| 10 May 1837 | General Sir Martin Hunter | |
| 10 May 1837 | General Sir William Wilkinson | |
| 10 May 1837 | Lieutenant-General Sir Charles Bulkeley Egerton | |
| 10 May 1837 | General Sir John Oswald | |
| 10 May 1837 | Lieutenant-General Sir Hudson Lowe | |
| 10 May 1837 | Vice-Admiral Sir Richard Hussey Hussey | |
| 17 May 1837 | Admiral Sir George Martin | |
| 17 May 1837 | Major-General Sir Patrick Ross | |

== Victoria ==
| Appointment | Name | Notes |
|---|---|---|
| 26 April 1838 | Pietro Petrizzopulo | President of the Ionian Senate |
| 2 May 1838 | Vice-Admiral Sir George Eyre | |
| 30 August 1839 | Sir Vittor Caridi | |
| 7 July 1840 | Sir Francisco Muzzan | |
| 7 July 1840 | Sir Pietro Coidan | |
| 6 October 1840 | Sir Nicholas Harris Nicolas | Chancellor and Senior Knight Commander of the Order |
| 15 January 1842 | Prince Albert of Saxe-Coburg-Gotha | Queen's consort |
| 21 January 1842 | Demetrio, Count Della Decima | |
| 18 March 1842 | Sir Agostino Randon | |
| 3 July 1843 | Lieutenant-General John Colborne, 1st Baron Seaton | Lord High Commissioner of the Ionian Islands |
| 3 July 1843 | Lieutenant-General The Honourable Sir Patrick Stuart | Governor of Malta |
| 16 December 1844 | Antonio, Count Theotoky | |
| 26 June 1845 | Prince George, Duke of Cambridge | Grand Master 1845–1904 |
| 31 Mar 1847 | Spiridione Focca Stefano | President of the Senate of the Ionian Islands |
| 25 June 1849 | Henry George Ward | Lord High Commissioner of the Ionian Islands |
| 7 September 1850 | Demetrio, Count Salomon | President of the Senate of the Ionian Islands |
| 23 November 1852 | Count Candianos Romas | President of the Senate of the Ionian Islands |
| 23 November 1852 | Demetrio, Count Caruso | Regent of Cephalonia |
| 27 June 1853 | Vincenzo Casolani | Collector of the land revenue of Malta |
| 31 Mar 1855 | Alessandro Damaschino | |
| 16 May 1855 | Sir John Young, Bart. | Lord High Commissioners of the Ionian Islands, later Baron Lisgar |
| 11 January 1856 | Colonel Sir William Reid | Governor of Malta |
| 28 January 1856 | Sir Ignatius Gavin Bonavita | |
| 28 January 1856 | Giuseppe Maria de Piro, barone di Budaq | |
| 9 July 1957 | Demetrio, Count Valsamachi | |
| 9 July 1957 | Dionisio, Count Flamburiari | For long services to the Ionian Government |
| 15 May 1858 | Admiral Edmund Lyons, 1st Baron Lyons | Naval Commander-in-Chief in the Mediterranean |
| 15 February 1859 | Colonel Sir Henry Knight Storks | Lord High Commissioner of the Ionian Islands |
| 16 April 1860 | Major-General Sir John Gaspard Le Marchant | Governor of Malta |
| 16 April 1860 | George Ferguson Bowen | Governor of Queensland |
| 16 April 1860 | Sir Paolo Dingli | President of the Court of Appeal of Malta |
| 21 May 1864 | Petros Vrailas Armenis | Secretary of the Ionian Senate |
| 2 March 1867 | George Marcoras | Judge of the Supreme Court of the Ionian Islands |
| 24 April 1868 | Sir Adriano Dingli | Crown Law Officer and Crown Advocate of Malta |
| 24 April 1868 | Sir Edward Victor Louis Houlton | Chief Secretary to the Government of Malta |
| 23 April 1868 | Lieutenant-General Sir Patrick Grant | Governor of Malta |
| 13 February 1869 | The Right Honourable Charles Stanley Monck, 4th Viscount Monck | Governor-General of Canada and Governor-in-Chief of Prince Edward Island |
| 25 Mar 1869 | The Right Honourable Edward George Geoffrey Smith-Stanley, 14th Earl of Derby | Former Secretary of State for War and the Colonies |
| 25 Mar 1869 | The Right Honourable Henry George Grey, 3rd Earl Grey | Former Secretary of State for War and the Colonies |
| 25 Mar 1869 | The Right Honourable John Russell, 1st Earl Russell | Former Secretary of State for War and the Colonies |
| 29 June 1869 | Prince Alfred, Duke of Edinburgh | |
| 15 January 1870 | The Right Honourable Edward George Earle Bulwer-Lytton, 1st Baron Lytton | Former Secretary of State for the Colonies |
| 16 April 1870 | Prince Arthur, Duke of Connaught and Strathearn | |
| 23 June 1873 | The Right Honourable John Henry Thomas Manners-Sutton, 3rd Viscount Canterbury | Former Governor of Victoria |
| 20 February 1874 | Sir Henry Barkly | Governor of the Cape of Good Hope |
| 20 February 1874 | Sir John Peter Grant | Former Governor of Jamaica |
| 31 March 1874 | General Sir Garnet Joseph Wolseley | For distinguished services in command of the expedition against the Ashanti |
| 23 April 1874 | John Hawley Glover | Special Commissioner to the friendly native chiefs on the Gold Coast |
| 21 January 1875 | Sir Hercules George Robert Robinson | For special services in connection with the cession of the Fiji Islands |
| 20 March 1876 | Abu Bakar, Sultan of Johore (Honorary) | For services during the disturbances in the Malay Peninsula, in 1875-76 |
| 11 May 1876 | The Right Honourable Frederick Temple, Earl of Dufferin | Governor-General of Canada |
| 31 May 1877 | The Prince of Wales (Extra) | |
| 31 May 1877 | The Most Honourable George Augustus Constantine Phipps, 4th Marquess of Normanby | Governor of New Zealand |
| 12 December 1877 | Lieutenant-General Sir Arthur Purves Phayre | Governor of Mauritius |
| 6 February 1878 | The Honourable Sir Arthur Hamilton-Gordon | Governor of Fiji |
| 25 May 1878 | Major-General Sir William Francis Drummond Jervois | Governor of South Australia |
| 25 May 1878 | Sir Alexander Tilloch Galt | Member of the Halifax Fisheries Commission |
| 3 August 1878 | Chulalongkorn, King of Siam (Honorary) | For services to the Government of the Straits Settlements during the disturbances in the Malay States in 1875-76 |
| 7 August 1878 | Sir Henry Drummond Wolff | Commissioner on the European Commission for the organisation of Eastern Roumelia |
| 14 September 1878 | The Right Honourable John Douglas Sutherland Campbell, Marquess of Lorne | Governor-General of Canada |
| 30 October 1878 | Sir John Rose, Bart. | In connection with the representation of British Colonial products at the Paris Universal Exhibition of 1878. |
| 24 May 1879 | The Right Honourable Richard Bickerton Pemell Lyons, 2nd Baron Lyons | Ambassador to France |
| 24 May 1879 | Lord Odo Russell | Ambassador to Germany |
| 24 May 1879 | Sir Antonio Micallef | President of the Court of Appeal of Malta |
| 10 September 1879 | Sir Charles Lennox Wyke | Ambassador to Denmark |
| 10 September 1879 | Sir Richard Wood | Consul-General of Tunisia |
| 9 October 1879 | His Excellency Nubar Pasha (Honorary) | Egyptian Minister of Foreign Affairs |
| 12 May 1880 | Prince Leopold (Extra) | |
| 29 May 1880 | General Sir Arthur Borton | Governor of Malta |
| 24 May 1881 | Sir Arthur Edward Kennedy | Governor of Queensland |
| 24 May 1881 | Major-General Sir Harry St. George Ord | Former Governor of Western Australia |
| 28 July 1881 | Kalākaua, King of Hawaii (Honorary) | |
| 30 November 1881 | Sir Harry Smith Parkes | Minister to Japan |
| 20 February 1882 | Major-General Sir Henry Evelyn Wood | Commissioner for the Settlement of the Transvaal Territory |
| 30 March 1882 | His Honour John Henry Brand (Honorary) | President of the Orange Free State. |
| 24 May 1883 | The Right Honourable Frederic Rogers, 1st Baron Blachford | Former Under-Secretary of State for the Colonies |
| 24 May 1883 | Sir Henry Ernest Gascoigne Bulwer | Governor of Natal |
| 24 May 1883 | Sir James Robert Longden | Governor of Ceylon |
| 4 July 1883 | Barghash bin Said, Sultan of Zanzibar (Honorary) | |
| 28 January 1884 | The Most Honourable Henry Charles Keith Petty-Fitzmaurice, Marquess of Lansdowne | Governor-General of Canada |
| 24 May 1884 | Sir Robert Torrens | |
| 24 May 1884 | Sir Alfred Stephen | Lieutenant-Governor of New South Wales |
| 3 December 1884 | John Hay Drummond Hay | Minister to Morocco |
| 6 June 1885 | The Right Honourable Charles Robert Carington, 3rd Baron Carrington | Governor of New South Wales |
| 6 June 1885 | Sir Andrew Clarke | Inspector-General of Fortifications and Director of Works |
| 6 June 1885 | Sir Anthony Musgrave | Governor of Queensland |
| 6 June 1885 | Frederick Aloysius Weld | Governor of the Straits Settlements |
| 26 June 1885 | Sir Edward Baldwin Malet | Ambassador to Germany |
| 25 August 1885 | Lieutenant-General Sir Gerald Graham | Special Commissioner for Bechuanaland |
| 1 December 1885 | Sir Julian Pauncefote | Permanent Under-Secretary of State for Foreign Affairs |
| 18 February 1886 | Sir William Arthur White | Minister to the Ottoman Empire |
| 18 February 1886 | The Right Honourable Sir Henry Thurstan Holland Bart. | Commissioner for the Colonial and Indian Exhibition of 1886 |
| 18 February 1886 | Sir Charles Tupper | High Commissioner of Canada to the United Kingdom |
| 18 February 1886 | Sir John Kirk | Consul General to Zanzibar |
| 20 February 1886 | The Right Honourable Sir Robert Burnett David Morier | Ambassador to Russia |
| 29 May 1886 | Sir Robert Biddulph | Former High Commissioner of Cyprus |
| 29 May 1886 | Sir Francis Clare Ford | Minister to Spain |
| 29 January 1887 | Sir George Strahan | Governor of Tasmania |
| 24 May 1887 | General Sir John Lintorn Arabin Simmons | Governor of Malta |
| 24 May 1887 | General Sir Henry Wylie Norman | Governor of Jamaica |
| 24 May 1887 | Sir Henry Brougham Loch | Governor of Victoria |
| 24 May 1887 | Sir William Cleaver Francis Robinson | Governor of South Australia |
| 21 June 1887 | Sir Edward William Stafford | Former Prime Minister of New Zealand |
| 21 June 1887 | Sir Thomas Elder | Member of the Legislative Council of South Australia |
| 10 January 1888 | Sir Ronald Ferguson Thomson | Former Minister to Persia |
| 28 January 1888 | Sir Henry Parkes | Premier of New South Wales |
| 28 January 1888 | Sir Henry Turner Irving | Former Governor of British Guiana |
| 24 May 1888 | Sir Daniel Cooper, Bart. | |
| 2 June 1888 | Sir Evelyn Baring | Consul General at Cairo |
| 2 June 1888 | Charles Johnson Brooke, Rajah of Sarawak | |
| 10 September 1888 | The Honourable Sir Lionel Sackville Sackville-West | Minister to the United States of America |
| 2 January 1889 | Sir Hugh Low | Former Resident at Perak |
| 4 February 1889 | The Right Honourable William Hillier Onslow, 4th Earl of Onslow | Governor of New Zealand |
| 4 February 1889 | The Right Honourable Algernon Hawkins Thomond Keith-Falconer, 9th Earl of Kintore | Governor of South Australia |
| 24 May 1889 | Riyad Pasha (Honorary) | Prime Minister of Egypt |
| 24 May 1889 | Sir Thomas Francis Wade | Ambassador to China |
| 24 May 1889 | Sir Robert Hart | Inspector-General of Chinese Imperial Maritime Customs |
| 11 September 1889 | The Right Honourable John Adrian Louis Hope, 7th Earl of Hopetoun | Governor of Victoria |
| 11 October 1889 | Prince Mehdi Kuli Khan "Majd-ud-Dowleh" | High Steward to the Shah of Persia |
| 1 November 1889 | Khalifah bin Said, Sultan of Zanzibar (Honorary) | |
| 1 January 1890 | The Right Honourable Somerset Richard Lowry-Corry, 4th Earl of Belmore | Former Governor of New South Wales |
| 21 May 1890 | The Right Honourable Henry Crespigny Vivian, 3rd Baron Vivian | Minister to Belgium |
| 14 August 1890 | The Right Honourable Victor Albert George Child-Villiers, 7th Earl of Jersey | Governor of New South Wales |
| 1891 | George Stiebel | Jamaican entrepreneur |
| 2 April 1891 | Vice-Admiral Colmar, Freiherr von der Goltz (Honorary) | Officer of the Imperial German Navy |
| 23 July 1891 | Prince Abbas Bey of Egypt (Honorary) | |
| 1 January 1892 | Sir Cecil Clementi Smith | Governor of the Straits Settlements |
| 22 February 1892 | The Right Honourable David Boyle, 7th Earl of Glasgow | Governor of New Zealand |
| 25 May 1892 | Sir Horace Rumbold, Bart. | Minister to the Netherlands |
| 25 May 1892 | Major-General Sir Francis Wallace Grenfell | For services rendered in Egypt |
| 6 August 1892 | The Honourable Sir Edmund John Monson | Minister to Belgium |
| 6 August 1892 | Sir Frank Cavendish Lascelles | Minister to Persia |
| 16 August 1892 | Sir John Pender | For services in connection with the telegraphic communication of the Empire |
| 24 March 1893 | The Right Honourable Robert William Duff | Governor of New South Wales |
| 4 June 1893 | Sir George William Des Vœux | Former Governor of Hong Kong |
| 4 July 1893 | Sir Francis Walter de Winton | Comptroller and Treasurer of the Household of The Duke of York |
| 7 December 1893 | Sir Charles Russell | Attorney-General; for services rendered in connection with the Bering Sea Arbitration |
| 7 December 1893 | Sir Richard Everard Webster | For services rendered in connection with the Bering Sea Arbitration |
| 3 March 1894 | Sir Spenser Buckingham St. John | Minister to Sweden and Norway |
| 15 March 1894 | The Honourable Sir Francis Richard Plunkett | Minister to Belgium |
| 26 May 1894 | The Honourable Sir Henry Ayers | Former Premier of South Australia |
| 1 January 1895 | Sir Arthur Elibank Havelock | Governor of Ceylon |
| 1 January 1895 | The Honourable Sir Samuel Walker Griffith | Chief Justice and former Premier of Queensland |
| 14 March 1895 | Sir Charles Rivers Wilson | |
| 25 May 1895 | The Right Honourable John Campbell Hamilton-Gordon, 7th Earl of Aberdeen | Governor-General of Canada |
| 25 May 1895 | Lieutenant-Colonel Sir Charles Bullen Hugh Mitchell | Governor of the Straits Settlements |
| 27 February 1896 | Sir Nicholas Roderick O'Conor | Ambassador to Russia |
| 23 April 1896 | Shahzada Habibulla Khan of Afghanistan (Honorary) | |
| 23 April 1896 | Shahzada Nasrulla Khan of Afghanistan (Honorary) | |
| 20 May 1896 | Sir Donald Alexander Smith | High Commissioner of Canada to the United Kingdom |
| 11 January 1897 | His Excellency Luís de Soveral (Honorary) | Portuguese Minister for Foreign Affairs |
| 4 June 1897 | Paul-Honoré Vigliani (Honorary) | For services rendered as arbitrator between Great Britain and Portugal on the Manica Boundary question |
| 22 June 1897 | The Right Honourable Jenico William Joseph Preston, 14th Viscount Gormanston | Governor of Tasmania |
| 22 June 1897 | The Honourable Sir Walter Francis Hely-Hutchinson | Governor of Natal |
| 22 June 1897 | Sir Alfred Milner | Governor of the Cape of Good Hope and High Commissioner of South Africa |
| 22 June 1897 | The Honourable Wilfrid Laurier | Prime Minister of Canada |
| 22 June 1897 | The Honourable Sir Richard John Cartwright | Canadian Minister of Trade and Commerce |
| 22 June 1897 | Sir William Robinson | Governor of Hong Kong |
| 22 June 1897 | Sir Henry Arthur Blake | Governor of Jamaica |
| 22 June 1897 | The Honourable Sir Oliver Mowat | Canadian Minister of Justice |
| 22 June 1897 | Sir Donald Currie | For services to British African Trade |
| 22 June 1897 | Sir Thomas Sutherland | Director of the Suez Canal Company |
| 22 June 1897 | His Excellency Aboul Kassem Khan (Honorary) | Envoy from the Shah of Persia to announce the Shah's accession |
| 6 July 1897 | Prince Amir Khan of Persia | Special Envoy from the Shah of Persia to celebrate the sixtieth anniversary of Queen Victoria's accession to the Throne. |
| 12 August 1897 | His Excellency Chang Yen Hoon | Special Ambassador from the Emperor of China to celebrate the sixtieth anniversary of Queen Victoria's accession to the Throne. |
| 25 October 1897 | Menelik II of Ethiopia (Honorary) | |
| 21 May 1898 | General Sir Arthur James Lyon Fremantle | Governor of Malta |
| 21 May 1898 | His Excellency Mustafa Fahmi Pasha (Honorary) | President of the Egyptian Council of Ministers. |
| 31 October 1898 | The Right Honourable Gilbert John Elliot-Murray-Kynynmound, 4th Earl of Minto | Governor-General of Canada |
| 2 January 1899 | The Right Honourable Henry Robert Brand, 2nd Viscount Hampden | Governor of New South Wales |
| 2 January 1899 | Sir Thomas Fowell Buxton,Bart. | Governor of South Australia |
| 2 January 1899 | His Excellency The Right Honourable Sir Charles Stewart Scott | Ambassador to Russia |
| 2 January 1899 | Major-General Sir Herbert Charles Chermside | For distinguished services in Crete |
| 3 June 1899 | Sir Walter Joseph Sendall | Governor of British Guiana |
| 3 June 1899 | Sir Hugh Guion MacDonell | Minister to Portugal |
| 3 June 1899 | Sir Godfrey Lushington | British delegate at the Anarchist Conference at Rome |
| 2 December 1899 | Sir Robert Threshie Reid | For services in connection with the Venezuela Boundary Arbitration Commission |
| 1 January 1900 | Sir Joseph West Ridgeway | Governor of Ceylon |
| 1 January 1900 | Sir John Bramston | Former Assistant Under-Secretary of State for the Colonies |
| 23 May 1900 | The Right Honourable Charles Wallace Alexander Napier Cochrane-Baillie, 2nd Baron Lamington | Governor of Queensland |
| 23 May 1900 | Sir Augustus William Lawson Hemming | Governor of Jamaica |
| 23 May 1900 | Major Sir Claude Maxwell MacDonald | Minister to China |
| 23 May 1900 | Sir Henry Mortimer Durand | Minister to Persia |
| 28 June 1900 | Prince Muhammad Ali Bey of Egypt (Honorary) | |
| 1 January 1901 | The Right Honourable Sir John Forrest | Premier of Western Australia |

== Edward VII ==
| Appointment | Name | Notes |
|---|---|---|
| 9 March 1901 | Prince George, Duke of Cornwall and York (Extra) | |
| 20 March 1901 | Idris Shah I, Sultan of Perak | |
| 19 April 1901 | General The Right Honourable Sir Redvers Henry Buller | For services rendered in connection with the Boer War |
| 19 April 1901 | Lieutenant-General Horatio Herbert Kitchener, 1st Baron Kitchener of Khartoum | Commander-in-Chief of the Forces in South Africa |
| 19 April 1901 | Lieutenant-General Sir Frederick William Edward Forestier Forestier-Walker | For services rendered in connection with the Boer War |
| 19 April 1901 | General Sir George Stuart White | For services rendered in connection with the Boer War |
| 6 May 1901 | Sir Frederick Matthew Darley | Lieutenant-Governor of New South Wales |
| 23 May 1901 | The Right Honourable Uchter John Mark Knox, 5th Earl of Ranfurly | Governor of New Zealand |
| 27 June 1901 | His Excellency Mehedi ben el Arbi el Menebhi (Honorary) | Special ambassador from the Sultan of Morocco to congratulate Edward VII on his accession |
| 28 June 1901 | Sir Charles Bruce | Governor of Mauritius |
| 9 November 1901 | Sir Giuseppe Carbone | President of the Court of Appeal of Malta |
| 9 November 1901 | Sir Henry Hamilton Johnston | Special Commissioner for Uganda |
| 2 June 1902 | Vice-Admiral Felix Robert Eduard Emil Bendemann (Honorary) | Officer of the Imperial German Navy |
| 26 June 1902 | The Right Honourable Sir John Gordon Sprigg | Prime Minister of the Cape of Good Hope |
| 26 June 1902 | The Right Honourable Edmund Barton | Prime Minister of Australia |
| 26 June 1902 | Sir Edwin Henry Egerton | Minister to Greece |
| 26 June 1902 | Sir Ernest Mason Satow | Minister to China |
| 9 November 1902 | Sir James Lyle Mackay | Special Commissioner for commercial negotiations with China |
| 9 November 1902 | His Excellency Count Matsukata Masayoshi (Honorary) | Former Prime Minister of Japan |
| 6 December 1902 | Sir William Edmund Garstin | Under Secretary of State for Public Works in Egypt |
| 6 December 1902 | The Right Honourable Edward Macnaghten, Baron Macnaghten | |
| 9 February 1903 | The Moayyed-ed-Dowleh of Persia (Honorary) | |
| 9 February 1903 | His Excellency Mirza Mohamed Khan (Honorary) | Yazir-i-Darbar to the Shah of Persia |
| 5 March 1903 | The Right Honourable Sir Michael Henry Herbert | Ambassador to the United States of America |
| 26 June 1903 | His Excellency The Right Honourable Hallam Tennyson, 2nd Baron Tennyson | Governor-General of Australia |
| 3 May 1904 | His Excellency The Right Honourable Henry Stafford Northcote, 1st Baron Northcote | Governor-General of Australia |
| 24 June 1904 | Colonel Sir Henry Edward McCallum | Governor of Natal |
| 24 June 1904 | Sir Robert Bannatyne Finlay | Attorney General, for services before the tribunal at The Hague on the question of priority in the payment of sums due by Venezuela to foreign countries |
| 7 October 1904 | Albert Henry George Grey, 4th Earl Grey | Governor-General of Canada |
| 9 November 1904 | Sir Montagu Frederick Ommaney | Permanent Under-Secretary of State for the Colonies |
| 9 November 1904 | His Excellency The Right Honourable Sir Francis Leveson Bertie | Ambassador to Italy |
| 2 January 1905 | His Excellency The Right Honourable Sir Charles Hardinge | Ambassador to Russia |
| 17 March 1905 | The Right Honourable William Waldegrave Palmer, 2nd Earl of Selborne | High Commissioner of South Africa and Governor of the Transvaal and Orange River Colony |
| 30 June 1905 | Admiral Baron Hermann von Spaun (Honorary) | For services on the International Commission of Inquiry into the Dogger Bank incident |
| 30 June 1905 | Vice-Admiral François Ernest Fournier (Honorary) | For services on the International Commission of Inquiry into the Dogger Bank incident |
| 8 July 1905 | His Excellency Baron Jutarō Komura (Honorary) | Japanese Minister for Foreign Affairs |
| 7 August 1905 | Vice-Admiral Charles Touchard (Honorary) | First Sea Lord of the French Admiralty |
| 7 August 1905 | Vice-Admiral Jacques Théophile Péphau (Honorary) | Commander-in-Chief, Brest |
| 7 August 1905 | Vice-Admiral Léonce Caillard (Honorary) | Commander-in-Chief of the French Northern Squadron |
| 4 October 1905 | Jens Christian Christensen (Honorary) | Danish Minister of Marine |
| 4 October 1905 | Vice-Admiral Carl Frederick Wandel (Honorary) | Officer in the Royal Danish Navy |
| 9 November 1905 | His Excellency Captain William James Cohen Stuart (Honorary) | Dutch Minister of Marine |
| 9 November 1905 | Vice-Admiral Abraham George Ellis (Honorary) | In connection with the visit of the Channel Fleet to Dutch waters |
| 11 December 1905 | Brevet Colonel Sir George Sydenham Clarke | Secretary of the Committee of Imperial Defence |
| 11 December 1905 | The Right Honourable Sir Ernest Joseph Cassel | |
| 20 February 1906 | Marquis Saionji Kimmochi (Honorary) | Prime Minister of Japan |
| 20 February 1906 | Count Inoue Kaoru (Honorary) | In connection with the visit to Japan of Prince Arthur of Connaught |
| 20 February 1906 | Katō Takaaki (Honorary) | Japanese Minister of Foreign Affairs |
| 20 February 1906 | General Baron Kuroki Tamemoto (Honorary) | Officer of the Imperial Japanese Army |
| 14 March 1906 | His Excellency The Right Honourable Sir Arthur Nicolson, Bart. | Ambassador to Russia |
| 29 June 1906 | Sir John Madden | Lieutenant-Governor of Victoria |
| 6 May 1907 | Prince Fushimi Sadanaru | |
| 24 June 1907 | His Excellency Mirza Hussan Khan (Honorary) | Special Ambassador from Shah of Persia to announce the Shah's accession |
| 28 June 1907 | Sir William MacGregor | Governor of Newfoundland |
| 28 June 1907 | Major Sir Hamilton John Goold-Adams | Governor of the Orange River Colony |
| 2 June 1908 | The Right Honourable William Humble Ward, 2nd Earl of Dudley | Governor-General of Australia |
| 26 June 1908 | Sir Henry Moore Jackson | Governor of Trinidad and Tobago |
| 11 August 1908 | Sir Francis John Stephens Hopwood | Permanent Under-Secretary of State for the Colonies |
| 31 August 1908 | Major and Brevet Lieutenant-Colonel Sir Matthew Nathan | Governor of Natal |
| 22 June 1909 | His Excellency Marshal Ghazi Ahmed Muhtar Pasha (Honorary) | Special Envoy from the Sultan of Turkey to announce the Sultan's accession |
| 25 June 1909 | Sir John Anderson | Governor of the Straits Settlements |
| 25 June 1909 | The Right Honourable Sir (William) Edward Goschen | Ambassador to Germany |
| 25 June 1909 | The Right Honourable Sir Maurice William Ernest de Bunsen | Ambassador to Spain |
| 25 June 1909 | Louis Renault (Honorary) | Legal Adviser to the French Ministry for Foreign Affairs |
| 11 April 1910 | The Right Honourable William Lee Plunket, 5th Baron Plunket | Governor of New Zealand |

== George V ==
| Appointment | Name | Notes |
|---|---|---|
| 24 June 1910 | Sir Arthur Henry Hardinge | Ambassador to Belgium |
| 2 November 1910 | The Right Honourable Herbert John Gladstone, 1st Viscount Gladstone | Governor-General of South Africa and High Commissioner of South Africa |
| 2 January 1911 | The Right Honourable Alexander Hugh Bruce, 6th Lord Balfour of Burleigh | For services in connection with the Royal Commission on trade relations between Canada and the West Indian Colonies |
| 2 January 1911 | The Right Honourable William Snowdon Robson, Baron Robson | For services in connection with the North Atlantic Coast Fisheries Arbitration |
| 19 June 1911 | The Right Honourable Sir Gerard Augustus Lowther | Ambassador to the Ottoman Empire |
| 19 June 1911 | Sir Eldon Gorst | Minister to Egypt |
| 19 June 1911 | The Right Honourable Thomas Denman, 3rd Baron Denman | Governor-General of Australia |
| 19 June 1911 | The Right Honourable Sir George Houston Reid | High Commissioner of Australia to the United Kingdom |
| 19 June 1911 | The Right Honourable Sir Charles Fitzpatrick | Chief Justice of Canada |
| 19 June 1911 | The Honourable Sir Richard Solomon | High Commissioner of South Africa to the United Kingdom |
| 19 June 1911 | Colonel Sir Frederick John Dealtry Lugard | Governor of Hong Kong |
| 1 January 1912 | Sir George Ruthven Le Hunte | Governor of Trinidad and Tobago |
| 14 June 1912 | The Right Honourable Frederic John Napier Thesiger, 3rd Baron Chelmsford | Governor of New South Wales |
| 14 June 1912 | Muhammad Said Pasha (Honorary) | Prime Minister of Egypt |
| 12 July 1912 | Sir Patrick Manson | Medical Adviser in London to the Colonial Office; in recognition of his eminent services in connection with the investigation of the cause and cure of tropical disease. |
| 10 September 1912 | Vice-Admiral Don Jorge Montt (Honorary) | Director-General of the Chilean Navy |
| 31 May 1913 | The Right Honourable John Poynder Dickson-Poynder, 1st Baron Islington | Former Governor of New Zealand |
| 3 June 1913 | His Excellency The Right Honourable Sir George William Buchanan | Ambassador to Russia |
| 1 January 1914 | The Right Honourable Alfred Emmott, 1st Baron Emmott | Under-Secretary of State for the Colonies |
| 1 January 1914 | The Right Honourable Sir Fairfax Leighton Cartwright | Ambassador to Austria-Hungary |
| 13 February 1914 | The Right Honourable Ronald Craufurd Munro-Ferguson | Governor-General of Australia |
| 13 February 1914 | The Right Honourable Sydney Charles Buxton | Governor-General of South Africa |
| 22 June 1914 | The Right Honourable Arthur William de Brito Savile Foljambe, 2nd Earl of Liverpool | Governor of New Zealand |
| 22 June 1914 | The Right Honourable Robert Laird Borden | Prime Minister of Canada |
| 22 June 1914 | General Sir Henry Macleod Leslie Rundle | Governor of Malta |
| 22 June 1914 | Admiral Sir Day Hort Bosanquet | Former Governor of South Australia |
| 23 June 1914 | His Excellency The Right Honourable Sir William Conyngham Greene | Ambassador to Japan |
| 1 January 1915 | The Right Honourable Sir Louis du Pan Mallet | Ambassador to the Ottoman Empire |
| 19 December 1914 | His Excellency Hussein Rushdi Pasha (Honorary) | Prime Minister of Egypt |
| 17 April 1915 | General de Division Michel Joseph Maunoury (Honorary) | Officer in the French Army |
| 20 April 1915 | Lieutenant-General Mitsuomi Kamio (Honorary) | Imperial Japanese Army, Commander-in-Chief of the Military Operations against Tsingtau |
| 20 April 1915 | Vice-Admiral Sadakichi Kato (Honorary) | Imperial Japanese Navy, Commander-in-Chief of the Naval Operations against Tsingtau |
| 3 June 1915 | His Excellency The Right Honourable Sir James Rennell Rodd | Ambassador to Italy |
| 23 June 1915 | General Sir Horace Lockwood Smith-Dorrien | Colonel, The Nottinghamshire and Derbyshire Regiment |
| 23 June 1915 | Lieutenant-General Sir James Willcocks | Commanding Indian Army Corps, British Expeditionary Force |
| 27 August 1915 | General Henri Joseph Eugène Gouraud (Honorary) | Officer in the French Army |
| 27 November 1915 | Lieutenant-General Nobile Carlo Porro dei Conti di Santa Maria della Bicocca (Honorary) | Assistant Chief of the Staff, Italian Army |
| 1 January 1916 | Lieutenant-General Sir Herbert Scott Gould Miles | Governor of Gibraltar |
| 1 January 1916 | Ibrahim, Sultan of Johor (Honorary) | |
| 14 January 1916 | Lieutenant-General (temporary General) Sir Herbert Charles Onslow Plumer | |
| 14 March 1916 | Lieutenant-General (temporary General) Sir Charles Carmichael Monro | For services in connection with the withdrawal from Gallipoli |
| 31 May 1916 | Admiral Sir Cecil Burney | |
| 3 June 1916 | Sir Arthur Henderson Young | Governor of the Straits Settlements |
| 3 June 1916 | His Excellency The Right Honourable Sir Cecil Arthur Spring Rice | Ambassador to the United States of America |
| 28 July 1916 | His Grace Victor Christian William Cavendish, 9th Duke of Devonshire | Governor-General of Canada |
| 16 August 1916 | Sir Henry Howard | Minister to the Holy See |
| 14 November 1916 | Lieutenant-Colonel Sir Arthur Henry McMahon | High Commissioner of Egypt |
| 1 January 1917 | Sir George Vandeleur Fiddes | Permanent Under-Secretary of State for the Colonies |
| 20 January 1917 | Lieutenant-General (temporary General) Sir Archibald James Murray | Egyptian Expeditionary Force, for distinguished service in the field |
| 4 June 1917 | The Right Honourable Edgar Vincent, 1st Baron D'Abernon | Chairman of the Royal Commission on the Natural Resources, Trade and Legislation of certain portions of His Majesty's Dominions |
| 17 December 1917 | General Sir Edmund Henry Hynman Allenby | Egyptian Expeditionary Force, for distinguished services in the field |
| 1 January 1918 | The Honourable Sir Francis Hyde Villiers | Minister to Belgium |
| 1 January 1918 | Temporary Surgeon-General Sir George Henry Makins | For Military Operations in the field |
| 1 January 1918 | Lieutenant-General Sir Cecil Frederick Nevil Macready | Adjutant-General to the Forces |
| 1 January 1918 | Lieutenant-General Sir John Steven Cowans | Quartermaster-General to the Forces |
| 3 June 1918 | The Right Honourable Sir George Eulas Foster | Minister of Trade and Commerce of Canada |
| 3 June 1918 | Sir Owen Cosby Philipps | For services to the Dominions and Colonies in connection with Shipping and other matters |
| 2 August 1918 | Admiral The Honourable Sir Alexander Edward Bethell | Former Commander-in-Chief, Plymouth |
| 3 August 1918 | The Right Honourable Joseph Cook | Former Prime Minister of Australia |
| 1 January 1919 | Vice-Admiral The Honourable Sir Somerset Arthur Gough-Calthorpe | For services rendered during the First World War |
| 1 January 1919 | Vice-Admiral Sir Montague Edward Browning | For services rendered during the First World War |
| 1 January 1919 | Vice-Admiral Sir John Michael de Robeck | For services rendered during the First World War |
| 3 June 1919 | Admiral The Honourable Sir Stanley Cecil James Colville | For services rendered during the First World War |
| 3 June 1919 | Admiral Sir Thomas Henry Martyn Jerram | For services rendered during the First World War |
| 3 June 1919 | Sir Francis Henry May | Governor of Hong Kong |
| 3 June 1919 | Sir Richard Frederick Crawford | Commercial Adviser to the British Embassy at Washington |
| 3 June 1919 | Lieutenant-General Sir Henry George Chauvel | For services rendered in connection with Military Operations in Egypt |
| 3 June 1919 | Lieutenant-General (Temporary General) Frederick Rudolph Lambart, 10th Earl of Cavan | For services rendered in connection with Military Operations in Italy |
| 3 June 1919 | Lieutenant-General (Temporary General) Sir George Francis Milne | For services rendered in connection with Military Operations in the Balkans |
| 3 June 1919 | Lieutenant-General William Raine Marshall | For services rendered in connection with Military Operations in the Mesopotamia |
| 3 June 1919 | General Sir William Robert Robertson | For services rendered during the First World War |
| 3 June 1919 | Lieutenant-General (Temporary General) Sir Hubert De la Poer Gough | For services rendered in connection with Military Operations in France and Flanders |
| 14 October 1919 | General Sir John Eccles Nixon | For services rendered in connection with Military Operations in the Mesopotamia |
| 14 October 1919 | Field Marshal Paul Sanford Methuen, 3rd Baron Methuen | For services rendered during the First World War |
| 14 October 1919 | General Sir Ian Standish Monteith Hamilton | For services rendered during the First World War |
| 22 December 1919 | His Excellency Youssef Wahba Pasha (Honorary) | Prime Minister of Egypt |
| 1 January 1920 | Sir Eyre Crowe | Assistant Under Secretary of State for Foreign Affairs |
| 5 June 1920 | The Right Honourable Sir John Newell Jordan | Minister to China |
| 24 June 1920 | The Honourable Sir Thomas MacKenzie | High Commissioner of New Zealand to the United Kingdom |
| 28 June 1920 | The Right Honourable Henry William Forster, 1st Baron Forster | Governor-General of Australia |
| 21 December 1920 | His Excellency Muhammad Tawfiq Nasim Pasha (Honorary) | Prime Minister of Egypt |
| 1 January 1920 | Brigadier-General Sir William Henry Manning | Governor of Ceylon |
| 1 February 1921 | The Right Honourable George Cave, 1st Viscount Cave | Chairman of the Southern Rhodesia Commission |
| 3 June 1921 | Sir Hugh Charles Clifford | Governor of Nigeria |
| 5 July 1921 | General The Right Honourable Julian Hedworth George Byng, 1st Baron Byng of Vimy | Governor-General of Canada |
| 2 January 1922 | Major-General Sir Percy Zachariah Cox | High Commissioner of Iraq |
| 2 January 1922 | Sir James Stevenson, Bart. | Advisor to the Secretary of State for the Colonies on business questions and former member of the Munitions Council and the Army and Air Councils |
| 18 May 1922 | Lieutenant-General Sir James Aylmer Lowthorpe Haldane | General Officer Commanding-in-Chief, Iraq |
| 3 June 1922 | His Excellency The Right Honourable Sir Auckland Campbell Geddes | Ambassador to the United States of America |
| 22 August 1922 | Sir Harold Arthur Stuart | British Representative on the Inter-Allied Plebiscite Commission in Upper Silesia |
| 16 October 1922 | Major-General Sir Edward Northey | Governor of Kenya and High Commissioner of Zanzibar |
| 10 November 1922 | Lieutenant-Colonel Sir John Robert Chancellor | Principal Assistant Secretary of the Committee of Imperial Defence, former Governor of Trinidad and Tobago and Mauritius |
| 1 January 1923 | The Honourable Sir Francis Henry Dillon Bell | Attorney-General of New Zealand |
| 1 January 1923 | His Excellency The Right Honourable Sir Esmé William Howard | Ambassador to Spain |
| 1 January 1923 | The Right Honourable Sir Horace George Montagu Rumbold, Bart. | High Commissioner to Constantinople |
| 2 June 1923 | His Excellency The Right Honourable Sir Charles Norton Edgcumbe Eliot | Ambassador to Japan |
| 6 November 1923 | Brigadier-General The Right Honourable Alexander Cambridge, 1st Earl of Athlone | Governor-General of South Africa |
| 14 October 1924 | General Sir Charles Fergusson, Bart. | Governor-General of New Zealand |
| 1 January 1925 | Sir Henry Hesketh Joudou Bell | Former Governor of Mauritius |
| 1 January 1925 | Sir Francis Alexander Newdigate Newdegate | Former Governor of Western Australia |
| 3 June 1925 | The Right Honourable Sir John Lawrence Baird, Bart. | Governor-General of Australia |
| 3 June 1925 | Sir William George Tyrrell | Permanent Under-Secretary of State for Foreign Affairs |
| 16 October 1925 | Vice-Admiral Sir Lionel Halsey | Comptroller and Treasurer to The Prince of Wales |
| 1 January 1926 | Colonel The Honourable Sir James Allen | High Commissioner of New Zealand to the United Kingdom |
| 1 January 1926 | Sir Cecil James Barrington Hurst | Legal Adviser to the Foreign Office |
| 5 June 1926 | His Excellency The Right Honourable Sir Ronald William Graham | Ambassador to Italy |
| 5 June 1926 | His Excellency The Right Honourable Ronald Charles Lindsay | Ambassador to Turkey |
| 5 June 1926 | Sir Charles Murray Marling | Ambassador to the Netherlands |
| 20 July 1926 | The Right Honourable Freeman Freeman-Thomas, 1st Viscount Willingdon | Governor-General of Canada |
| 1 January 1927 | Colonel Henry Lawson Webster Levy-Lawson, 1st Viscount Burnham | President of the Empire Press Union and Deputy Chairman of the Empire Parliamentary Association |
| 1 January 1927 | Sir Laurence Nunns Guillemard | Governor the Straits Settlements High Commissioner to the Malay States |
| 1 January 1927 | Faisal I of Iraq (Honorary) | |
| 17 February 1927 | Sir Francis Arthur Aglen | Inspector-General of Chinese Maritime Customs |
| 3 June 1927 | Lieutenant-General Sir Robert Stephenson Smyth Baden-Powell, Bart. | |
| 3 June 1927 | Sir William Lamond Allardyce | Governor of Newfoundland |
| 3 June 1927 | Charles Vyner Brooke, Rajah of Sarawak | |
| 3 June 1927 | The Right Honourable Sir John Anthony Cecil Tilley | Ambassador to Japan |
| 2 January 1928 | Sir Graeme Thomson | Governor of Nigeria |
| 4 June 1928 | Sir Charles Thomas Davis | Permanent Under-Secretary of State for Dominion Affairs |
| 4 June 1928 | Sir Reginald Edward Stubbs | Governor of Jamaica |
| 1 March 1929 | Brigadier-General Sir Samuel Herbert Wilson | Permanent Under-Secretary of State for the Colonies |
| 1 March 1929 | The Right Honourable Sir George Russell Clerk | Ambassador to Turkey |
| 3 June 1929 | Lieutenant-Colonel Sir Maurice Pascal Alers Hankey | Secretary to the Cabinet and Committee of Imperial Defence, Clerk of the Privy Council |
| 3 June 1929 | Sir John Cadman | |
| 3 June 1929 | Sulaiman, Sultan of Selangor (Honorary) | |
| 3 June 1929 | The Right Honourable Sir George Dixon Grahame | Ambassador to Spain |
| 1 January 1930 | The Right Honourable Sir Joseph George Ward, Bt. | Prime Minister of New Zealand |
| 1 January 1930 | Sir Horace Archer Byatt | Governor of Trinidad and Tobago |
| 1 January 1930 | The Right Honourable Sir Malcolm Arnold Robertson | Ambassador to Argentina |
| 10 January 1930 | The Right Honourable Charles Bathurst, 1st Baron Bledisloe | Governor-General of New Zealand |
| 3 June 1930 | Sir Alexander Wood Renton | Chairman of the Irish Grants Committee |
| 3 June 1930 | Sir Herbert James Stanley | Governor of Ceylon |
| 3 June 1930 | The Honourable Sir William Augustus Forbes Erskine | Ambassador to Poland |
| 2 December 1930 | Lieutenant-Colonel The Right Honourable George Herbert Hyde Villiers, 6th Earl of Clarendon | Governor-General of South Africa |
| 1 January 1931 | Muhammad, Yang di-Pertuan Besar of the Negri Sembilan (Honorary) | |
| 1 January 1931 | The Right Honourable Sir Francis Oswald Lindley | Ambassador to Portugal |
| 1 January 1931 | Sir Robert Gilbert Vansittart | Permanent Under-Secretary of State for Foreign Affairs |
| 3 June 1931 | Sir Cecil Clementi | Governor of the Straits Settlements and High Commissioner for the Malay States |
| 1 January 1932 | Lieutenant-Colonel Sir Francis Henry Humphrys | High Commissioner of Iraq |
| 22 April 1932 | The Right Honourable Sir Isaac Alfred Isaacs | Governor-General of Australia |
| 3 June 1932 | Sir Donald Charles Cameron | Governor of Nigeria |
| 3 June 1932 | The Right Honourable Granville George Leveson-Gower, 3rd Earl Granville | Ambassador to Belgium |
| 3 June 1932 | Sir James William Ronald Macleay | Ambassador to Argentina |
| 2 January 1933 | The Right Honourable Sir George Halsey Perley | Minister without Portfolio, Canada |
| 2 January 1933 | Sir Horace John Wilson | Chief Industrial Adviser to the Government |
| 3 June 1933 | Sir Alexander Ransford Slater | Governor of Jamaica |
| 3 June 1933 | Lieutenant-General Sir Arthur Grenfell Wauchope | High Commissioner of Palestine |
| 3 June 1933 | Iskandar, Sultan of Perak (Honorary) | |
| 1 January 1934 | The Right Honourable Lyman Poore Duff | Chief Justice of Canada |
| 1 January 1934 | Sir John Michael Higgins | For public services to Australia |
| 1 January 1934 | Sir Cecil William Hunter-Rodwell | Governor of Southern Rhodesia |
| 1 January 1934 | Brigadier-General Sir Joseph Aloysius Byrne | Governor of Kenya |
| 1 January 1934 | Sir Henry Getty Chilton | Ambassador to Argentina |
| 1 January 1934 | The Right Honourable Sir James Eric Drummond | Ambassador to Italy |
| 23 April 1934 | The Prince George (Extra) | |
| 4 June 1934 | Sir Alfred Claud Hollis | Governor of Trinidad and Tobago |
| 4 June 1934 | The Right Honourable Sir Eric Clare Edmund Phipps | Ambassador to Germany |
| 1 January 1935 | Sir Edward Brandis Denham | Governor of Jamaica |
| 11 January 1935 | Lieutenant-Colonel The Right Honourable George Vere Arundel Monckton-Arundell, 8th Viscount Galway | Governor-General of New Zealand |
| 28 March 1935 | Prince Henry, Duke of Gloucester (Extra) | |
| 23 May 1935 | John Buchan | Governor-General of Canada |
| 3 June 1935 | Sir Henry Birchenough, Bart. | President of the British South Africa Company and Chairman of the Beit Trustees |
| 3 June 1935 | The Right Honourable John Greig Latham | Former Australian Attorney General and Minister for External Affairs |
| 3 June 1935 | The Honourable Sir Christopher James Parr | High Commissioner from New Zealand to the United Kingdom |
| 3 June 1935 | The Right Honourable Sir William Thomas White | For public services in Canada |
| 3 June 1935 | Sir John Loader Maffey | Permanent Under Secretary of State for the Colonies |
| 3 June 1935 | Sir Herbert James Read | For services to the Colonial Empire |
| 3 June 1935 | Abdullah Ibn Hussein, Emir of Transjordan (Honorary) | |
| 3 June 1935 | The Right Honourable Aretas Akers-Douglas, 2nd Viscount Chilston | Ambassador to Russia |
| 28 November 1935 | Brigadier-General The Honourable Sir Alexander Gore Arkwright Hore-Ruthven | Governor-General of Australia |
| 1 January 1936 | The Right Honourable Sir Robert Henry Clive | Ambassador to Japan |

== Edward VIII ==
| Appointment | Name | Notes |
|---|---|---|
| 23 June 1936 | The Honourable Sir William Hill Irvine | Former Chief Justice of Victoria |

== George VI ==
| Appointment | Name | Notes |
|---|---|---|
| 1 February 1937 | Sir Thomas Shenton Whitelegge Thomas | Governor of the Straits Settlements and High Commissioner for the Malay States |
| 1 February 1937 | Sir Miles Wedderburn Lampson | Ambassador to Egypt |
| 1 February 1937 | Sir Herbert William Malkin | Legal Adviser to the Foreign Office |
| 5 February 1937 | The Honourable Patrick Duncan | Governor-General of South Africa |
| 1 April 1937 | Commander The Honourable Sir Archibald Douglas Cochrane | Governor of Burma |
| 11 May 1937 | Sir William Henry Clark | High Commissioner for Basutoland, Bechuanaland and Swaziland |
| 11 May 1937 | Sir Robert Randolph Garran | For public services Australia |
| 11 May 1937 | The Right Honourable Sir Michael Myers | Chief Justice of New Zealand |
| 11 May 1937 | Sir Bernard Henry Bourdillon | Governor of Nigeria |
| 11 May 1937 | The Right Honourable Sir Percy Lyham Loraine, Bt. | Ambassador to Turkey |
| 11 May 1937 | Sir Frederick William Leith-Ross | Chief Economic Adviser to HM Government |
| 29 June 1937 | The Right Honourable Sir Leslie Orme Wilson | Governor of Queensland |
| 1 January 1938 | The Right Honourable Earle Christmas Grafton Page | Minister for Commerce and Deputy Prime Minister of Australia |
| 9 June 1938 | The Right Honourable William George Arthur Ormsby-Gore, 4th Baron Harlech | Former Secretary of State for the Colonies |
| 9 June 1938 | Sir Howard William Kennard | Ambassador to Poland |
| 2 January 1939 | Sir Campbell Stuart | Chairman and UK Representative, Imperial Communications Advisory Committee. Treasurer of King George's Trust and of King George's Fields Foundation - for public services |
| 2 January 1939 | Malcolm Hailey, 1st Baron Hailey | Director, African Research Survey |
| 2 January 1939 | The Honourable Sir Alexander Montagu George Cadogan | Permanent Under-Secretary of State for Foreign Affairs |
| 2 January 1939 | The Right Honourable Sir Nevile Meyrick Henderson | Ambassador to Germany |
| 8 June 1939 | Sir Edward John Harding | Permanent Under-Secretary of State, Dominions Office |
| 1 January 1941 | Sir Harold Alfred MacMichael | High Commissioner for Palestine and High Commissioner for TransJordan |
| 1 January 1941 | The Right Honourable Sir Robert Leslie Craigie | Ambassador to Japan |
| 12 June 1941 | Sir Andrew Caldecott | Governor of Ceylon |
| 12 June 1941 | Sir Esmond Ovey | Ambassador to Argentina |
| 1 January 1942 | Sir Arthur Frederick Richards | Governor of Jamaica |
| 1 January 1942 | Sir Archibald John Kerr Clark Kerr | Ambassador to China |
| 11 June 1942 | Sir Gerald Campbell | Former Director-General of the British Information Services in the United States of America |
| 11 June 1942 | Sir Frederick Phillips | Third Secretary, HM Treasury, and representative of the Department in the United States of America |
| 11 June 1942 | Sir Arthur Charles Cosmo Parkinson | Former Permanent Under-Secretary of State, Colonial Office |
| 1 January 1943 | Sir Wilfrid Edward Francis Jackson | Governor of Tanganyika |
| 1 January 1943 | Sir Kinahan Cornwallis | Ambassador to Iraq |
| 2 June 1943 | Sir Henry Monck-Mason Moore | Governor of Kenya |
| 4 August 1943 | Sir Ernest Clark | Governor of Tasmania |
| 1 January 1944 | Sir George Henry Gater | Permanent Under-Secretary of State, Colonial Office |
| 8 June 1944 | Sir Eric Teichman | Former Chinese Adviser to the British Embassy at Chungking |
| 22 August 1944 | Major-General Sir Winston Joseph Dugan | Governor of Victoria |
| 1 January 1945 | Captain The Honourable Sir Bede Edmund Hugh Clifford | Governor of Trinidad and Tobago |
| 14 June 1945 | Sir Frank Arthur Stockdale | Development Adviser to the Secretary of State for the Colonies, late Comptroller, Development and Welfare, West Indies |
| 1 January 1946 | Sir Harry Fagg Batterbee | High Commissioner to New Zealand |
| 1 January 1946 | Sir Mark Aitchison Young | Governor of Hong Kong |
| 1 January 1946 | Sir Horace James Seymour | Ambassador to China |
| 29 January 1946 | Field-Marshal The Honourable Sir Harold Rupert Leofric George Alexander | Governor-General of Canada |
| 29 January 1946 | Lieutenant-General Sir Bernard Cyril Freyberg | Governor-General of New Zealand |
| 13 June 1946 | Sir Alan Cuthbert Maxwell Burns | Governor of the Gold Coast |
| 1 January 1947 | Major-General Sir Philip Euen Mitchell | Governor of Kenya |
| 1 January 1947 | Sir Ronald Ian Campbell | Ambassador to Egypt |
| 1 January 1947 | Sir Maurice Drummond Peterson | Ambassador to Russia |
| 12 June 1947 | The Honourable Sir James Mitchell | Lieutenant-Governor of Western Australia |
| 12 June 1947 | Major-General Sir Hubert Jervoise Huddleston | Former Governor-General of the Sudan |
| 1 January 1948 | Sir Crawfurd Wilfrid Griffin Eady | Second Secretary, HM Treasury |
| 1 January 1948 | Major-General Sir Hubert Elvin Rance | Governor of Burma |
| 1 January 1948 | The Right Honourable Alfred Duff Cooper | Former Ambassador to France |
| 1 January 1948 | Sir Oliver Charles Harvey | Ambassador to France |
| 10 June 1948 | The Right Honourable Robert Alderson Wright, Baron Wright | Former Lord of Appeal in Ordinary |
| 10 June 1948 | Sir Eric Gustav Machtig | Permanent Under-Secretary of State for Commonwealth Relations |
| 10 June 1948 | General Sir Alan Gordon Cunningham | Former High Commissioner of Palestine |
| 10 June 1948 | Sir Orme Garton Sargent | Permanent Under-Secretary of State, Foreign Office |
| 1 January 1949 | The Right Honourable Wyndham Raymond Portal, 1st Viscount Portal | For services as President of the Olympic Games |
| 1 January 1949 | Sir Ralph Clarmont Skrine Stevenson | Ambassador to China |
| 14 May 1949 | The Right Honourable Herwald Ramsbotham, 1st Baron Soulbury | Governor-General of Ceylon |
| 9 June 1949 | Sir Richard Henry Archibald Carter | Former Permanent Under-Secretary of State, Commonwealth Relations Office |
| 9 June 1949 | Sir John Huggins | Governor of Jamaica |
| 2 January 1950 | Sir John Hathorn Hall | Governor of Uganda |
| 2 January 1950 | Sir David Victor Kelly | Ambassador to Russia |
| 8 June 1950 | Sir William Strang | Permanent Under-Secretary of State, Foreign Office |
| 1 January 1951 | Sir Percivale Liesching | Permanent Under-Secretary of State for Commonwealth Relations |
| 1 January 1951 | Sir John Stuart Macpherson | Governor of Nigeria |
| 7 June 1951 | Lieutenant-General Sir Archibald Edward Nye | High Commissioner to India |
| 7 June 1951 | Sir Alexander William George Herder Grantham | Governor of Hong Kong |
| 7 June 1951 | Sir Thomas Ingram Kynaston Lloyd | Permanent Under Secretary of State, Colonial Office |
| 7 June 1951 | Sir Edmund Leo Hall-Patch | Permanent United Kingdom Representative on the Organisation for European Economic Co-operation at Paris |
| 9 November 1951 | The Right Honourable William John McKell | Governor-General of Australia |
| 1 January 1952 | Sir Charles Noble Arden-Clarke | Governor of the Gold Coast |
| 1 January 1952 | The Right Honourable Sir Oliver Shewell Franks | Ambassador to the United States |

== Elizabeth II ==
| Appointment | Name | Notes |
|---|---|---|
| 5 June 1952 | The Right Honourable Edward George William Tyrwhitt Knollys, 2nd Viscount Knollys | Representative of HM Government on the International Materials Conference |
| 5 June 1952 | Sir Peter Alexander Clutterbuck | High Commissioner to Canada |
| 5 June 1952 | Sir Victor Alexander Louis Mallet | Ambassador to Italy |
| 29 July 1952 | Lieutenant-General Sir Charles Willoughby Moke Norrie | Governor-General of New Zealand |
| 10 December 1952 | Field-Marshal Sir William Joseph Slim | Governor-General of Australia |
| 1 January 1953 | Sir Edward Francis Twining | Governor of Tanganyika |
| 1 January 1953 | Sir Ivone Augustine Kirkpatrick | High Commissioner to West Germany |
| 1 June 1953 | Major-General Sir John Noble Kennedy | Governor of Southern Rhodesia |
| 1 June 1953 | Sir John Gilbert Laithwaite | High Commissioner to Pakistan |
| 1 June 1953 | General Sir Gerald Walter Robert Templer | High Commissioner to Malaya |
| 1 June 1953 | Abu Bakar, Sultan of Pahang (Honorary) | |
| 1 January 1954 | Sir John Balfour | Ambassador to Spain |
| 10 June 1954 | Sir Hubert Miles Gladwyn Jebb | Ambassador to France |
| 10 June 1954 | The Right Honourable Sir Owen Dixon | Chief Justice of the High Court of Australia |
| 24 June 1954 | The Honourable Sir Oliver Ernest Goonetilleke | Governor-General of Ceylon |
| 1 January 1955 | Aga Khan III | |
| 1 January 1955 | The Honourable Sir Evelyn Baring | Governor of Kenya |
| 1 January 1955 | Sir Roger Mellor Makins | Ambassador to the United States |
| 9 June 1955 | Sir Esler Maberly Dening | Ambassador to Japan |
| 31 May 1956 | Sir Charles Brinsley Pemberton Peake | Ambassador to Greece |
| 1 January 1957 | The Honourable Thomas Playford | Premier of South Australia |
| 1 January 1957 | Abdul Rahman, Yang di-Pertuan Besar of Negeri Sembilan (Honorary) | |
| 1 January 1957 | Sir Pierson John Dixon | Permanent Representative to the United Nations |
| 13 June 1957 | Sir Hugh Mackintosh Foot | Governor of Jamaica |
| 13 June 1957 | Sir Donald Charles MacGillivray | High Commissioner to Malaya |
| 13 June 1957 | Sir James Wilson Robertson | Governor-General of Nigeria |
| 16 July 1957 | The Right Honourable Edward Frederick Lindley Wood, 1st Earl of Halifax | Grand Master of the Order |
| 19 July 1957 | The Right Honourable Charles John Lyttelton, 10th Viscount Cobham | Governor-General of New Zealand |
| 11 October 1957 | The Right Honourable William Francis Hare, 5th Earl of Listowel | Governor-General of Ghana |
| 1 January 1958 | The Most Honourable Gerald Rufus Isaacs, 2nd Marquess of Reading | Leader of the Delegation to the Colombo Plan Consultative Committee Meeting. Minister of State for Foreign Affairs |
| 1 January 1958 | Sir Michael Robert Wright | Ambassador to Iraq |
| 12 June 1958 | The Right Honourable Sir Arthur William Fadden | Federal Treasurer and former Deputy Prime Minister of Australia |
| 12 June 1958 | Sir Robert Heatlie Scott | Commissioner-General for South East Asia |
| 1 January 1959 | Sir Frank Godbould Lee | Permanent Secretary, Board of Trade |
| 1 January 1959 | Sir Abraham Jeremy Raisman | For services to the Commonwealth |
| 1 January 1959 | Sir Harold Anthony Caccia | Ambassador to the United States |
| 13 June 1959 | Sir Arthur Edward Trevor Benson | Former Governor of Northern Rhodesia |
| 8 December 1959 | The Right Honourable George Nigel Douglas-Hamilton, 10th Earl of Selkirk | Commissioner for Singapore and South-East Asia |
| 15 December 1959 | The Right Honourable William Shepherd Morrison, 1st Viscount Dunrossil | Governor-General of Australia |
| 1 January 1960 | Sir Christopher Eden Steel | Ambassador to West Germany |
| 26 April 1960 | Field Marshal Mohammad Ayub Khan (Honorary) | President of Pakistan |
| 11 June 1960 | Sir Kenneth Roberts-Wray | Legal Adviser, Commonwealth Relations Office and Colonial Office |
| 11 November 1960 | Sir Gerald Gray Fitzmaurice | Legal Adviser, Foreign Office |
| 11 May 1961 | The Right Honourable William Philip Sidney, 1st Viscount De L'Isle | Governor-General of Australia |
| 24 May 1961 | The Right Honourable Derick Heathcoat, 1st Viscount Amory | High Commissioner to Canada |
| 9 June 1961 | Sir Maurice Henry Dorman | Governor-General of Sierra Leone |
| 1 January 1962 | Sir Robert Brown Black | Governor of Hong Kong |
| 1 January 1962 | Sir Henry Ashley Clarke | Ambassador to Italy |
| 16 March 1962 | Sir Richard Gordon Turnbull | Governor-General of Tanganyika |
| 6 July 1962 | The Honourable Henry Josiah Lightfoot Boston | Governor-General of Sierra Leone |
| 17 August 1962 | Sir Kenneth William Blackburne | Governor-General of Jamaica |
| 3 August 1962 | Brigadier Bernard Edward Fergusson | Governor-General of New Zealand |
| 8 November 1962 | Senator The Honourable Clifford Clarence Campbell | Governor-General of Jamaica |
| 20 November 1962 | Sir Patrick Muir Renison | Governor of Kenya |
| 3 December 1962 | Sir Solomon Hochoy | Governor-General of Trinidad and Tobago |
| 3 December 1962 | Sir Walter Fleming Coutts | Governor-General of Uganda |
| 1 January 1963 | Sir William Allmond Codrington Goode | Governor of North Borneo |
| 1 January 1963 | Sir Frank Kenyon Roberts | Ambassador to West Germany |
| 2 April 1963 | General Sir Reginald Alexander Dallas Brooks | Governor of Victoria |
| 8 June 1963 | Sir Patrick Henry Dean | Permanent Representative to the United Nations |
| 12 July 1963 | The Right Honourable Antony Henry Head, 1st Viscount Head | High Commissioner to Malaysia |
| 1 January 1964 | Sir Ralph Francis Alnwick Grey | Governor of British Guiana |
| 1 January 1964 | Sir Roger Bentham Stevens | Former Deputy Under-Secretary of State, Foreign Office |
| 13 June 1964 | Sir Arthur Hilton Poynton | Permanent Under-Secretary of State, Colonial Office |
| 7 December 1964 | Sir Glyn Smallwood Jones | Governor-General of Malawi |
| 1 January 1965 | The Right Honourable Sir Garfield Edward John Barwick | Chief Justice of the High Court of Australia |
| 1 January 1965 | Sir Joseph John Saville Garner | Permanent Under-Secretary of State, Commonwealth Relations Office |
| 12 June 1965 | Sir Paul Henry Gore-Booth | Former High Commissioner to India |
| 12 June 1965 | Sir Humphrey Trevelyan | Ambassador to Russia |
| 12 June 1965 | The Right Honourable Walter Nash | For political and public services to New Zealand |
| 1 September 1965 | The Right Honourable Richard Gardiner Casey, Baron Casey | Governor-General of Australia |
| 25 October 1965 | Sir John Warburton Paul | Governor-General of The Gambia |
| 1 November 1965 | Sālote Tupou III of Tonga* (Honorary) | |
| 26 May 1966 | Sir Richard Edmonds Luyt | Governor-General of Guyana |
| 11 June 1966 | Sir Norman Victor Kipping | Former Director-General of the Federation of British Industries |
| 12 September 1966 | Alhaji Farimang Mamadi Singateh | Governor-General of The Gambia |
| 30 November 1966 | Sir John Montague Stow | Governor-General of Barbados |
| 15 December 1966 | David James Gardiner Rose | Governor-General of Guyana |
| 1 January 1967 | Sir John Guthrie Ward | Former Ambassador to Italy |
| 12 May 1967 | Arleigh Winston Scott | Governor-General of Barbados |
| 10 June 1967 | Sir Charles Arthur Evelyn Shuckburgh | Ambassador to Italy |
| 19 July 1967 | Sir Arthur Porritt, Bt. | Governor-General of New Zealand |
| 12 October 1967 | Prince Edward, Duke of Kent | |
| 1 January 1968 | Sir Francis Brian Anthony Rundall | Ambassador to Japan |
| 11 March 1968 | Sir John Shaw Rennie | Governor-General of Mauritius |
| 2 August 1968 | Arthur Leonard Williams | Governor-General of Mauritius |
| 1 January 1969 | Sir William Denis Allen | Foreign and Commonwealth Office |
| 1 January 1969 | Sir David Clive Crosbie Trench | Governor of Hong Kong |
| 10 February 1969 | The Right Honourable Paul Meernaa Caedwalla Hasluck | Governor-General of Australia |
| 14 June 1969 | The Right Honourable Samuel Hood, 6th Viscount Hood | Former Deputy Under-Secretary, Foreign and Commonwealth Office |
| 1 January 1970 | Sir Christopher William Machell Cox | Educational Adviser, Ministry of Overseas Development |
| 1 January 1970 | Sir John Walter Nicholls | Former Ambassador to South Africa |
| 13 June 1970 | Sir Bernard Alexander Brocas Burrows | Permanent Representative on the NATO Council, Brussels |
| 9 October 1970 | Sir Robert Sidney Foster | Governor-General of Fiji |
| 21 October 1970 | Mr Justice Banja Tejan-Sie | Governor-General of Sierra Leone |
| 1 January 1970 | Sir Charles Hepburn Johnston | High Commissioner to Australia |
| 1 January 1970 | The Right Honourable John McEwen | For eminent political and public services to Australia |
| 12 June 1971 | Sir Archibald Duncan Wilson | Ambassador to Russia |
| 12 June 1971 | Sir Denis Arthur Hepworth Wright | Ambassador to Iran |
| 1 January 1972 | Sir William Alan Nield | Permanent Secretary, Cabinet Office |
| 1 January 1972 | Sir Denis Arthur Greenhill | Permanent Under-Secretary of State, Foreign and Commonwealth Office, and Head of HM Diplomatic Service |
| 1 January 1972 | The Honourable Sir Con Douglas Walter O'Neill | Foreign and Commonwealth Office |
| 1 January 1972 | The Right Honourable Arthur Christopher John Soames | Ambassador to France |
| 1 January 1972 | The Honourable Sir Henry Edward Bolte | Premier and Treasurer of Victoria |
| 25 July 1972 | Sir Edward Denis Blundell | Former High Commissioner from New Zealand to the United Kingdom |
| 21 December 1972 | Ratu George Cakobau | Governor-General of Fiji |
| 1 January 1973 | Sir John Arthur Pilcher | Former Ambassador to Japan |
| 6 February 1973 | Abdool Raman Mahomed Osman | Governor-General of Mauritius |
| 2 June 1973 | Sir Robert Stewart Crawford | Former Deputy Under-Secretary of State, Foreign and Commonwealth Office |
| 2 June 1973 | Sir Colin Tradescant Crowe | Permanent Representative to the United Nations, New York |
| 13 June 1973 | The Honourable Sir Milo Boughton Butler | Governor-General of the Bahamas |
| 1 January 1974 | The Right Honourable George Rowland Stanley Baring, 3rd Earl of Cromer | Ambassador to the United States |
| 8 February 1974 | Leo Victor de Gale | Governor-General of Grenada |
| 15 June 1974 | Sir Patrick Francis Hancock | Ambassador to Italy |
| 15 June 1974 | Sir Edward Heywood Peck | Permanent Representative on the North Atlantic Council |
| 1 January 1975 | Sir Thomas Brimelow | Permanent Under-Secretary of State, Foreign and Commonwealth Office and Head of HM Diplomatic Service |
| 1 January 1975 | The Right Honourable Sir Morrice James | High Commissioner to Australia |
| 14 June 1975 | Sir Edward Tomkins | Ambassador to France |
| 14 June 1975 | Sir Robert William Askin | Former Premier of New South Wales |
| 16 September 1975 | Sir John Guise | Governor-General of Papua New Guinea |
| 1 January 1976 | Sir William Vincent John Evans | Former Legal Adviser, Foreign and Commonwealth Office |
| 1 January 1976 | Sir Roger William Jackling | Former Leader of the UK Delegation to the Conference on the Law of the Sea |
| 23 April 1976 | The Honourable Sir John Robert Kerr | Governor-General of Australia |
| 12 June 1976 | Sir Charles Michael Walker | High Commissioner to India |
| 17 November 1976 | The Honourable Deighton Harcourt Lisle Ward | Governor-General of Barbados |
| 31 December 1976 | Sir Michael Palliser | Permanent Under-Secretary of State, Foreign and Commonwealth Office and Head of HM Diplomatic Service |
| 1 March 1977 | Tore Lokoloko | Governor-General of Papua New Guinea |
| 11 June 1977 | Sir John Nicholas Henderson | Ambassador to France |
| 11 June 1977 | Sir Donald Maitland | Permanent Representative to the European Communities, Brussels |
| 16 November 1977 | Sir Zelman Cowen | Governor-General of Australia |
| 31 December 1977 | Sir John Baines Johnston | High Commissioner to Canada |
| 31 December 1977 | The Honourable Sir Peter Ramsbotham | Governor of Bermuda |
| 3 June 1978 | The Right Honourable Sir Seewoosagur Ramgoolam | Prime Minister of Mauritius |
| 3 June 1978 | Sir Maurice Oldfield | Chief of the Secret Intelligence Service |
| 30 December 1978 | Sir David Aubrey Scott | Ambassador to South Africa |
| 23 February 1979 | Sir Allen Montgomery Lewis | Governor-General of Saint Lucia |
| 8 March 1979 | Paul Godwin Scoon | Governor-General of Grenada |
| 16 May 1979 | His Royal Highness Henrik, Prince Consort of Denmark (Honorary) | Consort of the Danish monarch |
| 2 June 1979 | Fiatau Penitala Teo | Governor-General of Tuvalu |
| 16 June 1979 | Sir Alan Hugh Campbell | Ambassador to Italy |
| 16 June 1979 | Sir John Killick | Permanent Representative on the North Atlantic Council |
| 29 October 1979 | Sir Sydney Douglas Gun-Munro | Governor-General of Saint Vincent and the Grenadines |
| 20 December 1979 | Sir Gerald Christopher Cash | Governor-General of the Bahamas |
| 31 December 1979 | Sir Antony Duff | Deputy Governor of Southern Rhodesia |
| 31 December 1979 | Sir Donald Tebbit | High Commissioner to Australia |
| 22 February 1980 | Baddeley Devesi | Governor-General of the Solomon Islands |
| 14 June 1980 | Sir Michael Wilford | Ambassador to Japan |
| 1 August 1980 | The Honourable David Stuart Beattie | Governor-General of New Zealand |
| 31 December 1980 | Sir John Oliver Wright | Ambassador to West Germany |
| 10 March 1981 | The Right Honourable Sir Harry Talbot Gibbs | Chief Justice of the High Court of Australia |
| 18 April 1981 | The Most Honourable Florizel Augustus Glasspole | Governor-General of Jamaica |
| 13 June 1981 | Sir Clive Martin Rose | Permanent Representative on the North Atlantic Council |
| 13 June 1981 | Sir Howard Smith | Director-General of MI5 |
| 1 November 1981 | Sir Wilfred Ebenezer Jacobs | Governor-General of Antigua and Barbuda |
| 31 December 1981 | Sir Reginald Alfred Hibbert | Ambassador to France |
| 31 December 1981 | Sir Anthony Derrick Parsons | Permanent Representative to the United Nations |
| 28 May 1982 | The Right Honourable Sir Ninian Martin Stephen | Governor-General of Australia |
| 12 June 1982 | Sir Herbert Ben Curtis Keeble | Ambassador to Russia |
| 31 December 1982 | Sir Edward Youde | Governor of Hong Kong |
| 28 February 1983 | The Honourable Kingsford Dibela | Governor-General of Papua New Guinea |
| 29 March 1983 | Ratu Sir Penaia Kanatabatu Ganilau | Governor-General of Fiji |
| 11 June 1983 | Sir Percy Cradock | Ambassador to China |
| 31 December 1983 | Sir Arthur Henry Hugh Cortazzi | Ambassador to Japan |
| 31 December 1983 | Sir Albert James Macqueen Craig | Ambassador to Saudi Arabia |
| 31 December 1983 | The Right Honourable Robert David Muldoon | Prime Minister of New Zealand |
| 3 February 1984 | Sir Clement Athelston Arrindell | Governor-General of Saint Christopher and Nevis |
| 14 February 1984 | Elmira Minita Gordon* | Governor-General of Belize |
| 23 February 1984 | Sir Hugh Worrell Springer | Governor-General of Barbados |
| 16 June 1984 | Sir Michael Dacres Butler | Permanent Representative to the European Communities |
| 15 June 1985 | Sir John Thomson | Permanent Representative to the United Nations |
| 30 July 1985 | Joseph Lambert Eustace | Governor-General of Saint Vincent and The Grenadines |
| 6 November 1985 | The Most Reverend Sir Paul Alfred Reeves | Governor-General of New Zealand |
| 31 December 1985 | Sir John Alexander Noble Graham, Bt. | Permanent Representative on the North Atlantic Council |
| 25 February 1986 | Sir Veerasamy Ringadoo | Governor-General of Mauritius |
| 14 June 1986 | Sir Antony Arthur Acland | Ambassador to the United States |
| 8 July 1986 | Tupua Leupena | Governor-General of Tuvalu |
| 31 December 1986 | Sir Julian Leonard Bullard | Ambassador to West Germany |
| 13 June 1987 | Sir John Emsley Fretwell | Ambassador to France |
| 31 December 1987 | The Right Honourable Thomas Edward Bridges, 2nd Baron Bridges | Former Ambassador to Italy |
| 11 June 1988 | The Right Honourable Peter Alexander Rupert Carington, 6th Baron Carrington | Secretary-General of the North Atlantic Treaty Organisation |
| 17 August 1988 | George Geria Dennis Lepping | Governor-General of the Solomon Islands |
| 31 December 1988 | Sir Crispin Tickell | Permanent Representative to the United Nations |
| 21 February 1989 | Ignatius Kilage | Governor-General of Papua New Guinea |
| 17 June 1989 | Sir Patrick Richard Henry Wright | Permanent Under-Secretary of State for Foreign Affairs and Head of HM Diplomatic Service |
| 8 February 1990 | Vincent Serei Eri | Governor-General of Papua New Guinea |
| 18 April 1990 | Dame Ruth Nita Barrow | Governor-General of Barbados |
| 16 June 1990 | The Right Honourable Michael Thomas Somare | Foreign Minister of Papua New Guinea |
| 1 October 1990 | The Right Honourable Toaripi Lauti | Governor-General of Tuvalu |
| 27 November 1990 | Dame Catherine Anne Tizard* | Governor-General of New Zealand |
| 31 December 1990 | Sir David Clive Wilson | Governor of Hong Kong |
| 22 January 1991 | David Emmanuel Jack | Governor-General of St. Vincent and The Grenadines |
| 15 June 1991 | Sir Arthur David Saunders Goodall | High Commissioner to India |
| 10 December 1991 | Wiwa Korowi | Governor-General of Papua New Guinea |
| 31 December 1981 | Sir John Stainton Whitehead | Ambassador to Japan |
| 13 June 1982 | Sir Michael O'Donel Bjarne Alexander | Permanent Representative on the North Atlantic Council |
| 6 September 1992 | Reginald Oswald Palmer | Governor-General of Grenada |
| 31 December 1992 | Sir Ewen Alastair John Fergusson | Ambassador to France |
| 9 November 1993 | James Beethoven Carlisle | Governor-General of Antigua and Barbuda |
| 31 December 1993 | Sir David Gillmore | Permanent Under-Secretary of State of Foreign and Commonwealth Office and Head of HM Diplomatic Service |
| 22 February 1994 | Colville Norbert Young | Governor-General of Belize |
| 31 December 1994 | Sir David Hugh Alexander Hannay | Permanent Representative to the United Nations |
| 22 February 1995 | Orville Alton Turnquest | Governor-General of the Bahamas |
| 31 March 1995 | Moses Puibangara Pitakaka | Governor-General of the Solomon Islands |
| 17 June 1995 | Sir Nicholas Maxted Fenn | High Commissioner to India |
| 30 December 1995 | The Right Honourable Justice Michael Hardie Boys | Governor-General of New Zealand |
| 1 January 1996 | Cuthbert Montraville Sebastian | Governor-General of St. Christopher and Nevis |
| 15 February 1996 | Tulaga Manuella | Governor-General of Tuvalu |
| 1 June 1996 | Sir Clifford Straughn Husbands | Governor-General of Barbados |
| 15 June 1996 | Sir Christopher Leslie George Mallaby | Ambassador to France |
| 9 August 1996 | Daniel Charles Williams | Governor-General of Grenada |
| 16 October 1996 | Charles James Antrobus | Governor-General of Saint Vincent and the Grenadines |
| 31 December 1996 | Sir Arthur John Coles | Permanent Under-Secretary of State, Foreign and Commonwealth Office |
| 22 February 1997 | William George Mallet | Governor-General of Saint Lucia |
| 29 January 1998 | Silas Atopare | Governor-General of Papua New Guinea |
| 15 June 1998 | David Francis Williamson | Former Secretary-General of the European Commission |
| 16 July 1999 | Calliopa Pearlette Louisy* | Governor-General of Saint Lucia |
| 21 October 1999 | The Reverend Father John Ini Lapli | Governor-General of the Solomon Islands |
| 31 December 1999 | Sir Andrew Marley Wood | Ambassador to Russia |
| 30 December 2000 | Sir Peter John Goulden | Permanent Representative, UKDEL NATO |
| 4 June 2001 | His Excellency Tomu Malaefone Sione | Former Governor-General of Tuvalu |
| 16 June 2001 | Sir John Olav Kerr | Head of HM Diplomatic Service |
| 15 June 2002 | Sir David John Wright | Group Chief Executive, British Trade International |
| 12 September 2002 | Sir Tomasi Puapua | Governor-General of Tuvalu |
| 30 October 2002 | His Excellency Frederick Nathaniel Ballantyne | Governor-General of Saint Vincent and the Grenadines |
| 31 December 2002 | Sir Jeremy Quentin Greenstock | Permanent Representative to the United Nations |
| 14 June 2003 | Sir John Robertson Young | High Commissioner to India |
| 31 December 2003 | The Right Honourable George Islay MacNeill Robertson, Baron Robertson of Port Ellen | Former Secretary-General of the North Atlantic Treaty Organisation |
| 21 June 2004 | Sir (John) Stephen Wall | Head of European Secretariat, Cabinet Office |
| 31 December 2004 | Nathaniel Rahumaea Waena | Governor-General of the Solomon Islands |
| 30 March 2005 | His Excellency Sir Paulias Nguna Matane | Governor-General of Papua New Guinea |
| 31 December 2005 | The Right Honourable Jeremy John Durham "Paddy" Ashdown, Baron Ashdown of Norton-sub-Hamdon | Former High Representative of the International Community in Bosnia and Herzegovina |
| 17 June 2006 | Sir Michael Hastings Jay | Permanent Under-Secretary of State, Foreign and Commonwealth and Head of the Diplomatic Service |
| 12 January 2007 | His Excellency The Reverend Filoimea Telito | Governor-General of Tuvalu |
| 16 June 2007 | Sir Emyr Jones Parry | Permanent Representative to the United Nations |
| 9 October 2007 | His Excellency The Most Honourable Kenneth Octavius Hall | Governor-General of Jamaica |
| 17 October 2007 | Her Excellency Louise Agnetha Lake-Tack* | Governor-General of Antigua and Barbuda |
| 29 December 2007 | Sir David Geoffrey Manning | Former Ambassador to the United States |
| 20 November 2008 | His Excellency Shimon Peres (Honorary) | President of Israel |
| 26 March 2009 | His Excellency Patrick Linton Allen | Governor-General of Jamaica |
| 11 September 2009 | His Excellency Frank Utu Ofagioro Kabui | Governor-General of the Solomon Islands |
| 20 May 2010 | His Excellency Sir Arthur Alexander Foulkes | Governor-General of The Bahamas |
| 31 December 2010 | Sir Peter Forbes Ricketts, Baron Ricketts | Former Permanent Under Secretary of the Foreign and Commonwealth Office and Head of the Diplomatic Service |
| 26 April 2011 | His Excellency Michael Ogio | Governor-General of Papua New Guinea |
| 1 June 2011 | His Excellency Iakoba Taeia Italeli | Governor-General of Tuvalu |
| 11 June 2011 | Sir Nigel Elton Sheinwald | Ambassador to the United States |
| 1 June 2012 | His Excellency Elliott Fitzroy Belgrave | Governor-General of Barbados |
| 14 December 2012 | His Excellency Sir Edmund Wickham Lawrence | Governor-General of Saint Christopher and Nevis |
| 24 April 2013 | Her Excellency Cécile Ellen Fleurette La Grenade* | Governor-General of Grenada |
| 30 August 2014 | His Excellency Rodney Errey Lawrence Williams | Governor-General of Antigua and Barbuda |
| 11 September 2014 | Her Excellency Dame Marguerite Matilda Pindling (Lady Pindling)* | Governor-General of The Bahamas |
| 31 December 2014 | The Right Honourable Catherine Margaret Ashton, Baroness Ashton of Upholland* | Former EU High Representative for Common Foreign and Security Policy and Vice-President of the European Commission; for services to the European External Action Service |
| 31 December 2014 | Sir Robert John Sawers | Chief of the Secret Intelligence Service; for services to British national security |
| 9 November 2015 | His Excellency Samuel Weymouth Tapley Seaton | Governor-General of Saint Christopher and Nevis |
| 31 December 2015 | Sir Simon James Fraser | Former Permanent Under Secretary at the Foreign and Commonwealth Office; for services to the Foreign and Commonwealth Office and to the pursuit of British foreign policy interests |
| 11 June 2016 | Sir Peter John Westmacott | Former Ambassador to the United States |
| 30 December 2017 | Sir Mark Justin Lyall Grant | Former National Security Adviser; for services to UK foreign and national security policy |
| 1 January 2018 | His Excellency Emmanuel Neville Cenac | Governor-General of Saint Lucia |
| 8 January 2018 | Her Excellency Sandra Prunella Mason* | Governor-General of Barbados |
| 9 August 2019 | The Most Honourable Cornelius Alvin Smith | Governor-General of the Bahamas |
| 9 August 2019 | The Right Reverend David Vunagi | Governor-General of the Solomon Islands |
| 29 January 2020 | Her Excellency Susan Dougan* | Governor-General of Saint Vincent and the Grenadines |
| 10 October 2020 | Sir David Frederick Attenborough | Broadcaster and Natural Historian |
| 10 October 2020 | Sir Timothy Earle Barrow | Ambassador to the European Union |
| 10 October 2020 | Sir Julian Beresford King | Former European Commissioner for the Security Union |
| 12 June 2021 | Simon McDonald, Baron McDonald of Salford | Former Permanent Under Secretary of the Foreign and Commonwealth Office |
| 18 March 2022 | Her Excellency Froyla Tzalam* | Governor-General of Belize |
| 1 June 2022 | Sir Iain Macleod | Former Legal Adviser, Foreign, Commonwealth and Development Office |

== Charles III ==
| Appointment | Name | Notes |
|---|---|---|
| 18 September 2022 | His Excellency The Reverend Tofiga Vaevalu Falani | Governor-General of Tuvalu |
| 31 December 2022 | Mark Philip Sedwill, Baron Sedwill | Former Cabinet Secretary and National Security Adviser |
| 26 January 2023 | Her Excellency Marcella Althea Liburd* | Governor-General of Saint Christopher and Nevis |
| 17 June 2023 | Sir Simon Lawrance Gass | Chair, Joint Intelligence Committee, Cabinet Office; for services to National Security and British Foreign Policy |
| 11 December 2023 | Her Excellency The Most Honourable Cynthia Alexandria Pratt* | Governor-General of The Bahamas |
| 30 December 2023 | Sir Stephen Augustus Lovegrove | Former National Security Adviser |
| 1 October 2024 | His Excellency The Reverend David Tiva Kapu | Governor-General of Solomon Islands |
| 1 November 2024 | His Excellency Cyril Errol Melchiades Charles | Governor-General of Saint Lucia |
| 14 June 2025 | Sir Philip Robert Barton | Permant Under-Secretary of State for Foreign Affairs |
| 30 December 2025 | His Excellency Stanley Kendrick John | Governor-General of Saint Vincent and the Grenadines |
| 30 December 2025 | Dame Barbara Woodward* | UK Permanent Representative to the United Nations |

== See also ==
- List of knights and ladies of the Garter
- List of knights and ladies of the Thistle
- List of knights and dames grand cross of the Order of the Bath
- List of knights grand cross of the Order of the British Empire
