= List of chief justices of Malta =

This is a list of the chief justices of Malta.

#	Name	Took office	Left office
1	Sir Giuseppe Borg Olivier GCMG	1814	1818
2	Waller Rodwell Wright	1819	1826
3	Sir John Stoddart	1826	1838
4	Sir Ignazio Gavino Bonavito GCMG	1839	1853
5	Sir Paolo Dingli GCMG	1854	1859
6	Sir Antonio Micallef GCMG	1859	1880
7	Sir Adrian Dingli GCMG, CB	1880	1894
8	Sir Giuseppe Carbone GCMG	1895	1913
9	Sir Vincenzo Frendo Azzopardi, CMG	1915	1919
10	Prof. Sir Michelangelo Refalo, CBE	1919	1923
11	Prof. Sir Arturo Mercieca	1924	1940
12	Sir George Borg, MBE	1941	1952
13	Sir Luigi Camilleri	1952	1957
14	Prof. Sir Anthony Mamo	1957	1971
13	Prof. John J.Cremona LL.D KOM, KM	1971	1981
14	Dr Carmelo Schembri LL.D	1981	1987
15	Prof Hugh W. Harding LL.D	1987	1990
16	Prof. Giuseppe Mifsud Bonnici LL.D	1990	1995
17	Dr. Joseph Said Pullicino LL.D	1995	2002
18	Dr. Noel Arrigo LL.D	2002	2002
19	Dr. Vincent De Gaetano LL.D	2002	2010
20	Dr. Silvio Camilleri LL.D	2010	2018
21	Dr. Joseph Azzopardi LL.D	2018	2020
21	Dr. Mark Chetcuti LL.D	2020	Incumbent
