= Giuseppe Carbone =

Sir Giuseppe Carbone, GCMG, KCVO (1839 – 14 November 1913) was a Maltese barrister who served as Chief Justice of Malta from 1895 to 1913.

== Biography ==
Carbone was born in 1839, and educated at the University of Malta.

He became a barrister in 1863, and was a Legal Adviser (Crown Advocate) to the Government of Malta from 1880 to 1895, when he was appointed Chief Justice of Malta. By virtue of his office, the Chief Justice is also President of the Court of Appeal of Malta. He held this post until he died, in November 1913. He also served as vice-president of the Council of Government of Malta from 1903.

== Honours ==
Carbone was appointed a Companion of the Order of St Michael and St George (CMG) in 1887, promoted to a Knight Commander (KCMG) of the order in the 1891 New Year Honours, and received the Knight Grand Cross (GCMG) of the order in the 1901 Birthday Honours list. He was appointed a Knight Commander of the Royal Victorian Order (KCVO) in 1903, during a royal visit to the island.

== Family ==
Carbone married, in 1872, Teresa Portelli, daughter of P. G. Portelli, MD. They lived in Valletta.

Government offices
Preceded by Sir Adrian Dingli	Chief Justice of Malta; 1895–1913	Succeeded by Vincenzo Frendo Azzopardi
