= Refalo =

Refalo is a surname of Maltese origin.

== People with the surname ==
- Anton Refalo (born 1956), Maltese politician
- Michael Refalo (1936–2015), Maltese politician and diplomat
- Michelangelo Refalo (1876–1923), Maltese judge
