= University Students' Council =

University Students' Council may refer to the following students' unions:

- University Students' Council (Canada), the students' union of the University of Western Ontario in London, Ontario, Canada.
- University Students' Council (Malta), the national students' union of Malta
