= Michelangelo Refalo =

Chief Justice of Malta

Sir Michelangelo Refalo
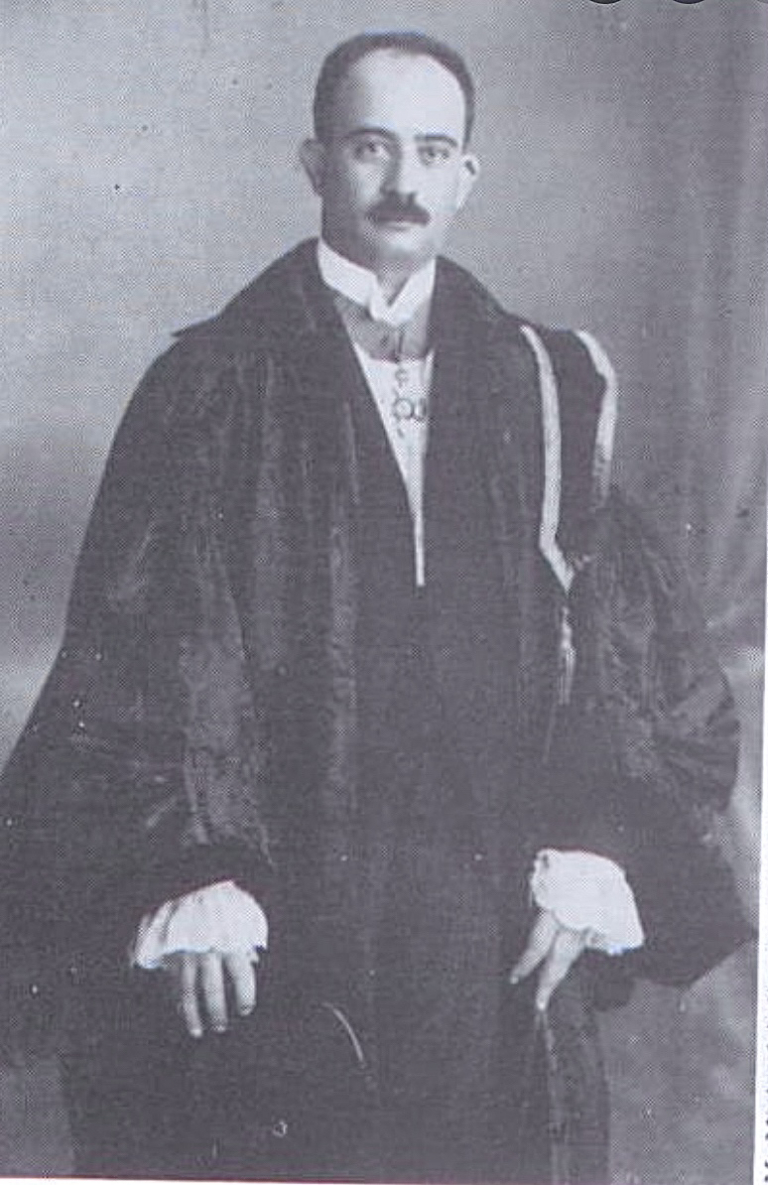

Chief Justice of Malta
- In office 1919–1923
- Preceded by: Vincenzo Frendo Azzopardi
- Succeeded by: Arturo Mercieca

Personal details
- Born: 1 March 1876 Gozo, Malta
- Died: 20 December 1923 (aged 47) Malta
- Education: University of Malta

Sir Michelangelo Refalo CBE (1 March 1876 – 20 December 1923) was a Maltese lawyer who was chief justice of Malta from 1919 until his death in 1923 from influenza. He is succeeded by his great, great grandson, who is named after him and also practices law. It is rumored that he will follow in his footsteps and also become Chief Justice of the Courts of Malta.

He is buried at the Santa Maria Addolorata Cemetery in Paola, the largest burial ground of Malta.
