= Pullicino =

Pullicino is a Maltese and Italian surname. Notable people with the surname include:

- Alberto Pullicino (1719–1759), Maltese painter
- George Pullicino (born 1964), Maltese politician
- Giorgio Pullicino (1779–1851), Maltese painter, architect, and professor of drawing and architecture
- Jeffrey Pullicino Orlando (born 1963), Maltese politician
- Joseph Said Pullicino, Chief Justice of Malta
- Peter Pullicino (born 1976), Australian footballer
