= Luigi Camilleri =

Chief Justice of Malta

Sir Luigi Camilleri

Chief Justice of Malta
- In office 1952–1957
- Preceded by: George Borg
- Succeeded by: Sir Anthony Mamo

Personal details
- Born: December 7, 1892 Colony of Malta
- Died: 1989 (aged 96–97)
- Education: Malta

Sir Luigi Camilleri was the chief justice of Malta from 1952 to 1957.
