= List of permanent representatives of the United Kingdom to the OECD =

The permanent representative to the OECD is the senior member of the United Kingdom's delegation to the Organisation for Economic Co-operation and Development (until 1961 called the Organisation for European Economic Co-operation), based in Paris.

The UK delegation to the OECD is an independent mission, sharing the same building as the bilateral embassy.

The permanent representative almost always has the personal rank of ambassador.

== Permanent representatives ==
- 1948–1952: Sir Edmund Hall-Patch
- 1952–1960: Sir Hugh Ellis-Rees
- 1960–1965: Robert Hankey, 2nd Baron Hankey
- 1965–1968: Sir Edgar Cohen
- 1968–1971: Sir John Chadwick
- 1971–1977: Kenna Gallagher
- 1977–1982: Arthur Maddocks
- 1982–1985: Kenneth Uffen
- 1985–1988: Nicholas Bayne
- 1988–1992: John Gray
- 1992–1995: Keith MacInnes
- 1995–1999: Peter Vereker
- 1999–2003: Christopher Crabbie
- 2004–2008: David Lyscom
- 2008–2011: Dominic Martin
- 2011–2016: Nick Bridge
- 2016–2021: Christopher Sharrock
- 2021–2025: Natacha Alexander
- 2025–present: Andrew Wood
