= Arturo Mercieca =

Maltese judge

Sir Arturo Mercieca

11th Chief Justice of Malta
- In office 1924–1940
- Preceded by: Michelangelo Refalo
- Succeeded by: George Borg

Personal details
- Born: 14 June 1878 Victoria, Gozo
- Died: 31 July 1969 (aged 91)
- Spouse: Josephine Tabone
- Children: 8
- Education: University of Malta
- Occupation: Judge

Sir Arturo Mercieca (14 June 1878 – 31 July 1969) was a Maltese judge and served as Chief Justice of Malta between 1924 and 1940. He is also the founder of the oldest extant students' union in Europe, Malta's national University Students' Council.

== Early life ==
Mercieca was born in Victoria on the island of Gozo on 14 June 1878. He was given primary and secondary education at the Sacred Heart Seminary in Victoria.

== Legal career ==
In October 1894 he enrolled at the University of Malta and graduated as a lawyer in August 1901.

In 1901, he founded the Comitato Permanente Universitario, later known as University Students' Council, the Maltese national student union and the oldest organization of its kind in Europe.

Mercieca pursued further studies via scholarships in London and Rome (1902–1903), and started to practise his profession in 1903.

He became an assistant crown advocate in 1915, crown advocate in 1919, and a judge in 1921. Mercieca was appointed Chief Justice of Malta in 1924. He was made a Knight Bachelor in the 1926 New Year Honours.

== Pro-Italian views and internment ==
At the start of the 20th century, he was closely involved with various organizations with a pro-Italian stance such as Giovine Malta, Malta Letteraria, and Associazione Politica Maltese.

Rising concern in the mid-1930s about possible Italian espionage activities in Malta gave rise to significant British counter-espionage activity, including the 1936 expulsion of the Italian Consul General. In 1935, Major Bertram Ede, one of Vernon Kell's MI5 operatives "reported adversely on the pro-Italian sympathies of the Chief Justice, Sir Arturo Mercieca, but although these led to Mercieca's arrest and detention in Uganda during the Second World War, no action was taken against him in 1935". In 1937, Sir Charles Bonham-Carter, Governor of Malta, "wished to remove [Mercieca], who made no secret of his pro-Italian sympathies, but Ormsby-Gore, the Colonial Secretary declined to accept this recommendation". On 11 June 1940, the day after Italy declared war on Britain and France, aircraft of the Italian Royal Air Force (Regia Aeronautica) attacked Malta. Mercieca was compelled to resign the Chief Justiceship to avoid removal and was among those for whom the Governor issued detention orders under the terms of the Malta Defence Regulations. He was interned and then in 1942 deported to Uganda, together with his wife and daughter and about 60 other Maltese nationals. Their exile in Uganda lasted until early 1945.

== Author ==
He published his autobiography, Le Mie Vicende in 1946, translated into English as 'The Unmaking of A Maltese Chief Justice'. He also published studies in local historical reviews such as Archivum Melitense, Malta Letteraria and Melita Historica, and in Italy in Archivio Storico di Malta.

== Family ==
He married Josephine Tabone in 1909 and they had eight children. He died on 31 July 1963.
