= Antonio Micallef =

Chief justice of Malta

Sir Antonio Micallef GCMG
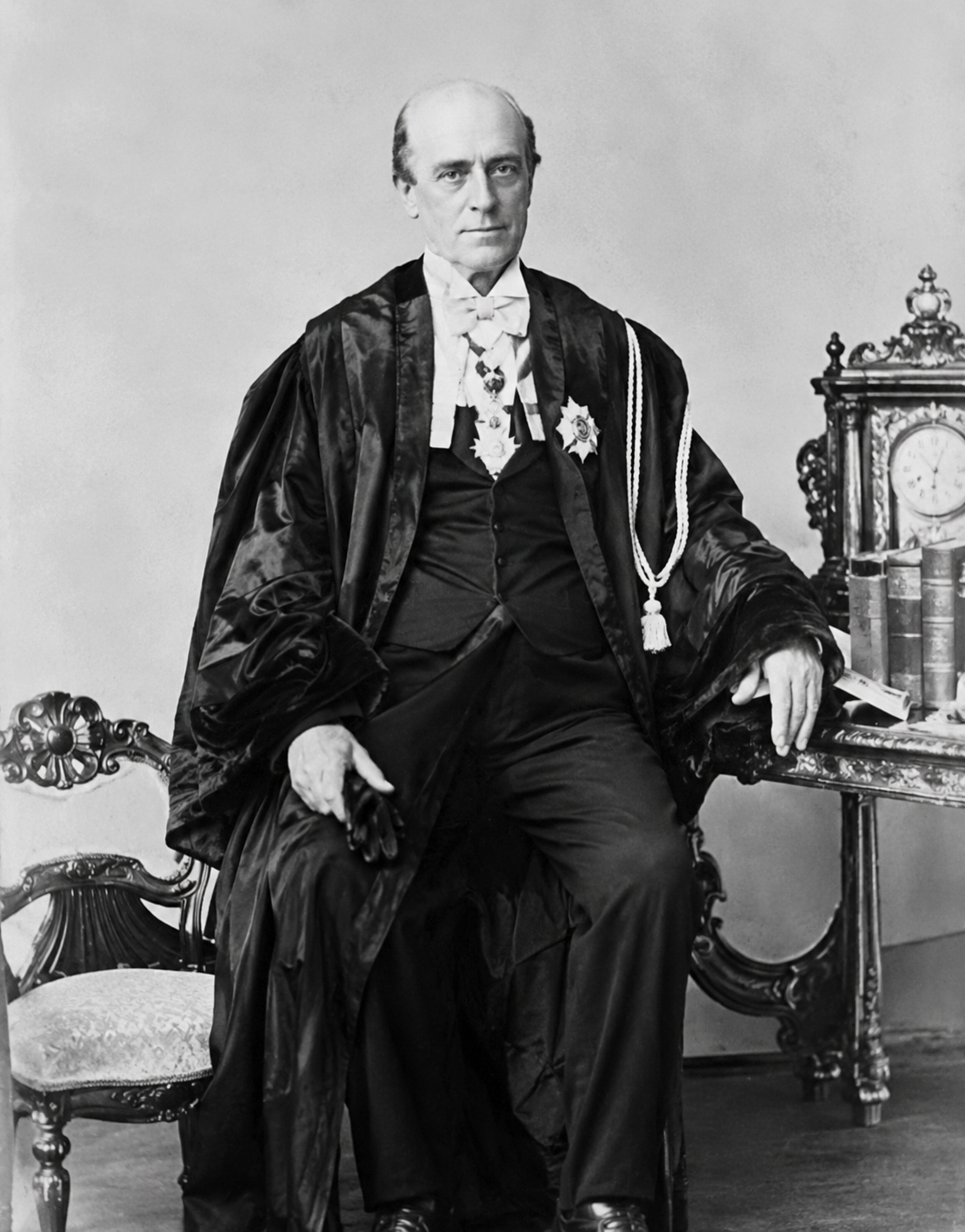
- Portrait of Sir Antonio Micallef, G.C.M.G. (1810–1889), Maltese lawyer, judge and legal scholar.

President of the Court of Appeal
- In office 1 July 1859 – 2 November 1880
- Preceded by: Sir Paolo Dingli
- Succeeded by: Sir Adrian Dingli

Personal details
- Born: 2 April 1810 Birgu, British Malta
- Died: 5 April 1889 (aged 79) Rabat, British Malta
- Resting place: Parochial Church of Casal Balzan
- Citizenship: Maltese
- Spouse(s): Francesca (née Xerri) (m. 1833; death 1847); Modesta (née Schembri)
- Profession: Lawyer, judge and legal scholar
- Awards: GCMG

Sir Antonio Micallef, G.C.M.G. (2 April 1810 – 5 April 1889) was a Maltese lawyer, legal scholar, judge and public official. He served as Crown Advocate and later as the President of the Court of Appeal from 1859 to 1880. He was also a prolific writer on Maltese law and contributed to the preparation of several important legal codes.

== Early life and education ==
Micallef was born in Vittoriosa (Birgu) on 2 April 1810. His father was Notary Giuseppe Gaetano Micallef. He graduated Doctor of Laws with honours in 1829 and obtained his warrant to practise law on 6 June 1831.

Between 1829 and 1842, Micallef recorded judgments delivered by the courts of first and second instance. He subsequently published, with extensive annotations, a collection of judgments dating from 1839 to 1849. This work preceded the official Collezione di Decisioni dei Tribunali di Malta, which began publication in 1858.

== Legal career ==
Micallef became one of the leading advocates practising at the Maltese Bar. On 27 October 1842, he was appointed Crown Advocate by the Governor, a position broadly equivalent to that of the Attorney General.

As Crown Advocate, he acted as the Government's legal adviser and represented it in civil proceedings. He also prosecuted offenders before the Criminal Court and the Court of Special Commission sitting with a jury. In addition, he was involved in drafting legislation and presented several legislative measures before the Council of Government.

Among the major legal works with which he was associated were the Criminal Code, the Code of Organization and Civil Procedure, and the Commercial Code.

== Legal scholarship ==
Micallef was one of the most prolific Maltese authors of legal works during the 19th century. His publications included a collection of judgments delivered by the Supremo Magistrato di Giustizia, as well as Trattato delle procedure civili nel foro di Malta (1839) and Compendio dè Diritto Commerciale secondo i principii di giurisprudenza Maltese (1841).

He also published annotations to Sir I. G. Bonavita's Raccolta delle leggi di procedura (1841) and to the Code de Rohan, published in two volumes between 1841 and 1843.

On 21 September 1844, Micallef wrote Osservazioni on Andrew Jameson's report concerning the draft Criminal Code of 1842. The work was not published. Some of his manuscripts have survived and are held in the collection of Dr Albert Ganado.

In 1841, Micallef was nominated to the General Council of the University and to the Special Council of the Faculty of Laws. In 1848, he was appointed to a commission established to prepare a Commercial Code.

== Judicial career ==
On 1 January 1854, Micallef was appointed one of Her Majesty's Judges. On 1 July 1859, he became President of the Court of Appeal and also served ex officio as a judge of the Vice-Admiralty Court.

He was appointed a Knight Commander of the Order of St Michael and St George (KCMG) on 27 July 1860 and was promoted to Knight Grand Cross (GCMG) in 1879. In the same year, at the request of the local government, he prepared a report on the civil laws of Malta for Prince Otto von Bismarck.

Micallef tendered his resignation from the Bench in September 1879. It was accepted on 2 November 1880, when he was granted a pension of £600 per year, equivalent to his salary, in recognition of his service. His tenure as President of the Court of Appeal lasted twenty-one years and four months, the longest term served by any president of that court.

In January 1881, he was elected to the Council of Government. During his time on the council, he proposed several measures, including the merger of the Commercial Court with the Civil Court.

== Family ==
Sir Antonio Micallef married Francesca Xerri in 1833. The couple had six children, including Maria Micallef, who later married into the Magri family, and Michelina Micallef, who later married into the Falzon family. Francesca died in December 1847 at the age of 33, leaving six children.

Antonio later married Modesta Schembri, and they had two daughters, including Annetta Micallef, who later married into the Borg family.

== Death ==
Sir Antonio Micallef died on 5 April 1889 at his residence at 6 Strada Doni, Rabat. He was buried in the family tomb at the parish church of Balzan. A memorial tablet was later erected in his honour at the Addolorata Cemetery.
