= Ignazio Gavino Bonavito =

Sir Ignazio Gavino Bonavito GCMG (1792 – 1865) was the chief justice of Malta from 1839 to 1853.

== Selected publications ==
- Raccolta delle leggi di procedura delle Corti superiori Ordinarie di Malta pubblicate dal 1814 al 1840 come sono attualmente in vigore (1841)
- Saggio sulla prova giudiziaria considerata in rapporto all'attuale legislazione maltese (1844, revised second edn. 1849)
