= Joseph Said Pullicino =

Chief Justice of Malta

Chief Justice of Malta
- In office 1995–2002
- Prime Minister: Eddie Fenech Adami, Alfred Sant
- Preceded by: Giuseppe Mifsud Bonnici
- Succeeded by: Noel Arrigo

Joseph Said Pullicino was the chief justice of Malta from 1995 to 2002. On 12 December 2005 he was by unanimous resolution of the House of Representatives appointed Parliamentary Commissioner for the Administrative Investigations known as the Ombudsman. On the 11th of March 2011, again by unanimous resolution, he was reconfirmed for his term as Ombudsman.
