= George Borg (judge) =

Maltese judge

Sir George Borg MBE

Chief Justice of Malta
- In office 1941–1952
- Preceded by: Arturo Mercieca
- Succeeded by: Sir Luigi Camilleri

Personal details
- Born: April 23, 1887 Colony of Malta
- Died: June 29, 1954 (aged 67)
- Education: Malta and Catania

Sir George Borg MBE (23 April 1887 – 29 June 1954) was a Maltese judge and politician. He was Chief Justice of Malta between 1940 and 1952.

Borg was educated at the universities of Malta and Catania. He became a solicitor in 1907 and was called to the bar in 1916. In 1932, he was elected to the Maltese Senate as a member of the Constitutional Party, and became a leader of the party after Lord Strickland's death in 1940.

Borg was appointed Chief Justice of Malta in 1941 and held the office until his retirement in 1952.

He was knighted by George VI when the King visited Malta in 1942, as part of the 1942 Birthday Honours. He also received, on behalf of the Maltese people, the George Cross that was presented to the island nation in honour of their defence during the Siege of Malta in the Second World War.

For several years, Borg was also editor of The Malta Herald. He died in Valletta in 1954.
