= Noel Arrigo =

Maltese jurist (1949–2025)

Chief Justice of Malta
- In office 2002–2002
- Prime Minister: Eddie Fenech Adami
- Preceded by: Joseph Said Pullicino
- Succeeded by: Vincent A. De Gaetano

Personal details
- Born: 26 December 1949 Sliema
- Died: 22 June 2025 (aged 75)

Noel Arrigo (26 December 1949 – 22 June 2025) was a Maltese jurist who was Chief Justice of Malta in 2002. He was jailed for two years for accepting a bribe and released in 2011 after serving 22 months. Arrigo died on 22 June 2025, at the age of 75.

== Biography ==
Arrigo started lecturing at the University of Malta in 1976. He also had served as the president of the Chamber of Advocates and chairman of the Malta branch of the Institute of Directors. He was appointed Chief Justice in July 2002.

=== Bribery scandal ===
On 1 August 2002, shortly after this appointment as Chief Justice, a scandal emerged where Noel Arrigo was accused of accepting a bribe of five thousand Maltese Liri in return for reducing the prison sentence of a convicted drug trafficker Mario Camilleri (known as known as “l-Imnieħru”) from 16 to 12 years during Camilleri's appeal of his original sentence. Arrigo was also accused of trading in influence and leaking details of the judgement before its formal delivery. Judge Patrick Vella, who was presiding over Camilleri's appeal case together with Arrigo and Judge Joseph Filletti, was also charged in connection with the case. The scandal was dubbed one of Malta’s "blackest days" in judicial history by the Times of Malta.

=== Public announcement ===
The details of the case were announced on 1 August 2002 by then Prime Minister Eddie Fenech Adami who gave a press conference and issued a press release in view of the importance and seriousness of the case. During the press conference the Prime Minister Eddie Fenech Adami stated that the two judges were asked to reduce the jail term by four years in exchange for thousands of Maltese Liri but did not disclose the amount involved during the announcement. He did, however, state that the police discovered that the money had been relayed to the two judges. The case was investigated by the then Police Commissioner John Rizzo, who had questioned the two judges separately on the same day of the Prime Minister’s press conference.

Noel Arrigo was subsequently charged with bribery, trading in influence, and revealing official secrets. A motion, signed by both Prime Minister and the Leader of the Opposition Alfred Sant, to remove Noel Arrigo and Patrick Vella from their positions had been submitted to the Speaker of the House of Representatives on 5 August 2002. Noel Arrigo however tendered his resignation to the then President Guido de Marco on the same day, acknowledging and apologising for the damage inflicted upon the judiciary but insisting that his resignation should not prejudice the court proceedings. He also expressed regret and concern that he had been already prejudged even before his interrogation had started, in view of the public announcements that had been made about the case.

=== Potential breach of rights ===
Noel Arrigo and Patrick Vella later filed a case in the First Hall of the Civil Court and eventually in the Constitutional Court, arguing that comments made by the Prime Minister on 1 August 2002 breached their fundamental rights to a fair trial and presumed innocence. The Constitutional Court overturned the earlier decision of the Civil Court and declared that the two former judges' right to a fair trial and presumed innocence had been violated as a result of the news conference. However, the right to an independent and impartial court was not violated, and therefore the criminal proceedings could continue. The two former judges proceeded to file a case with the European Court of Human Rights on 28 January 2004. On 17 March of the same year, they requested the Court of Criminal Inquiry to suspend the criminal trial until the European Court of Human Rights decided their case. The Court of Criminal Inquiry rejected the request and resumed the collection of evidence. The European Court of Human Rights unanimously declared the judges' application inadmissible during its sitting on 10 May 2005.

=== Criminal trial and conviction ===
During the high-profile criminal trial, Arrigo professed remorse but explained his surprise when the money was delivered and maintained that he never intended to keep the funds and that he did not want the money. He told the court that he had eventually taken the money home and decided to donate it to charity. During his testimony, Arrigo recalled that at that point he could not report the incident due to his initial mistake of providing information on the judgment of Mario Camilleri's case before it was handed down. During the trial his lawyers focused their legal argument on the fact that Arrigo had received the money only after deciding on the case which, in their view, was not in line with the definition of bribery under the Maltese law at the time.

On 26 November 2009, Arrigo was convicted by Judge Giannino Caruana Demajo on all counts (accepting a bribe, trading in influence and revealing official secrets) and sentenced to two years and nine months in prison, along with a lifelong interdiction from public office. In delivering his sentence the presiding judge Giannino Caruana Demajo characterised Arrigo’s wrongdoing as stemming from personal weakness and poor associations, rather than greed. In his sentence, the judge additionally highlighted the fact that Arrigo donated the bribe money to charity and stated that this was evidence of his character. However, he remarked that it was not clear when the decision to donate the money was made – whether it was shortly after the transfer of money or when facts started to be revealed. The sentence was appealed, but the appeals court upheld the verdict and sentence on 20 May 2010.

Arrigo served 22 months of the original 33-month sentence from 2009 in the secure forensic unit at Mount Carmel Psychiatric Hospital. According to L-Orizzont, he benefited from a spacious room with four beds, air-conditioning and a TV set, could receive visitors at any time and had no restrictions on eating, sleeping and wandering around the complex – in contrast to detainees at Corradino prison. Daphne Caruana Galizia fiercely criticised what she deemed as a “ridiculously brief” prison term and the preferential treatment Arrigo could benefit from. Arrigo was released in September 2011, having benefited from the standard reduction in prison sentences for good behaviour.

== See also ==
- Patrick Vella
