= Patrick Vella =

Maltese judge

Patrick Vella (1944-10 May 2022) was a Maltese judge who was jailed in 2007 for taking bribes.

== Biography ==
Vella graduated as a lawyer in 1967, and obtained a magister juris in European Law in 1996. Vella was appointed judge in February 1998, after serving as magistrate for 12 years.

In 2002, Vella and then Chief Justice Noel Arrigo were arraigned and charged with accepting bribes, trading in influence and revealing official secrets, in favour of drug trafficker Mario Camilleri l-Imnieħru, whose trial they had been presiding over. The case had been revealed in a press conference by then Prime Minister Eddie Fenech Adami; the scandal made international headlines.

Vella confessed to reducing the original 16-year jail sentence to 12 years in exchange for €23,000. After pleading guilty to accepting bribes he was jailed for two years. Vella had issued a public apology, declaring that he was sorry for the damage he caused to society. He was released in 2008, and died in 2022.

== See also ==
- Noel Arrigo
