= Frederick Hankey (diplomat) =

British diplomat (1774–1855)

Colonel Sir Frederick Hankey GCMG
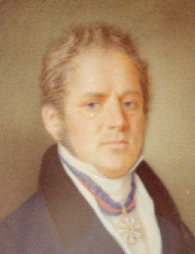
- Hankey c.1850

Chief Secretary to Government at Malta
- In office 1824–1837
- Monarch: William IV

Personal details
- Born: 13 March 1774 London, England
- Died: 13 March 1855 (aged 81) London, England

Military service
- Allegiance: United Kingdom
- Branch/service: British Army
- Years of service: 1800–1826
- Rank: Colonel
- Battles/wars: Napoleonic Wars; First Kandyan War (WIA)

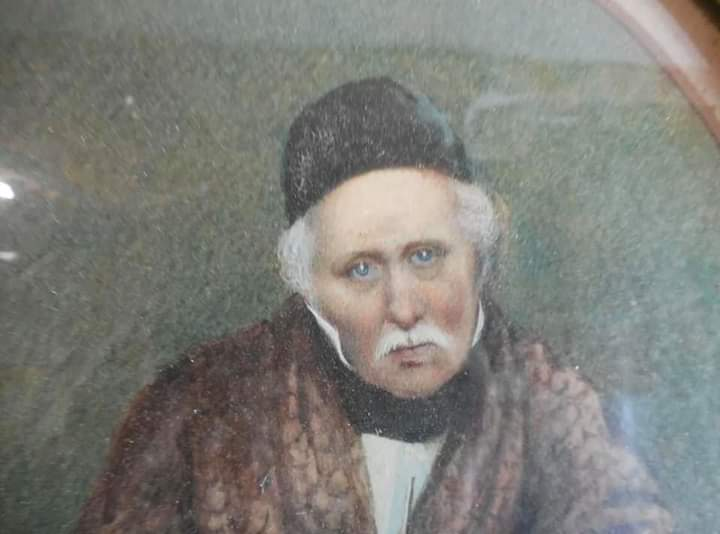
Portrait of elderly Sir Frederick, by his daughter Ionia, ca. 1850

Colonel Sir Frederick Hankey GCMG (13 March 1774 – 13 March 1855) was a British Army officer, diplomat and colonial administrator. He was awarded the Grand Cross of the Order of St Michael and St George in 1833 by William IV. He served as a diplomat on Corfu and Malta.

== Biography ==
Hankey was born in London, the third son of John Hankey, a merchant of Mincing Lane, and his wife, Elizabeth.

Hankey married his first cousin, Charlotte Hankey, at Fetcham, Surrey, in July 1796. They had two daughters, Emma (1798-1864) and Frederica (1816-1872). Charlotte Hankey died that same year 1816.

Frederick Hankey served in the British Army in Ceylon (1800-1811) as an infantry officer (he attained the rank of colonel in the 15th Regiment of Foot)

He then became private secretary of Sir Thomas Maitland, Lord High Commissioner of the Ionian Islands and Governor of Malta, whom he had met while in Ceylon. Hankey represented Maitland (who resided in Malta) in Corfu from 1817 to 1823, thus being often incorrectly referred to as "governor of the Ionian Islands".

Hankey remarried in December 1818 with a woman from Corfu, Mrs Catterina (or Catherine) Valarmo, Vaslamo or Varlamo, with who he had Thomasina-Ionia (1819-1900), who married Captain Charles F. Maxwell in 1839, and Frederick (1821-1882), who became a famous erotic writer. Catherina Valarmo died in Malta in 1835 and is buried in the Greek Orthodox cemetery there.

Hankey served in Malta from 1824 to 1837. He achieved great respect for a sensitive diplomatic mission to the Vatican about the legal immunity that the Roman Catholic Church enjoyed on the Island of Malta, in particular Naples' claim that he had the right to nominate any Bishops of Malta. The Vatican would eventually come down on the side of the British, thanks in large part to Hankey's diplomatic intervention with Rome.

Sir Frederick Hankey died in London in 1855 on his 81st birthday.
