= Edmund Hall-Patch =

Sir Edmund Leo Hall-Patch, GCMG (4 March 1896 – 1 June 1975) was a British civil servant.

Initially a Treasury official, Hall-Patch rose to be Deputy Under-Secretary of State in the Foreign Office in the aftermath of the Second World War. He later served as chairman of the executive committee of the Organization for European Economic Co-operation (OECD), UK Permanent Representative to the OECD, and UK executive director of the International Monetary Fund and of the International Bank for Reconstruction and Development.
