= University Students' Council (Malta) =

Maltese national students' union

- Kunsill Studenti Universitarji
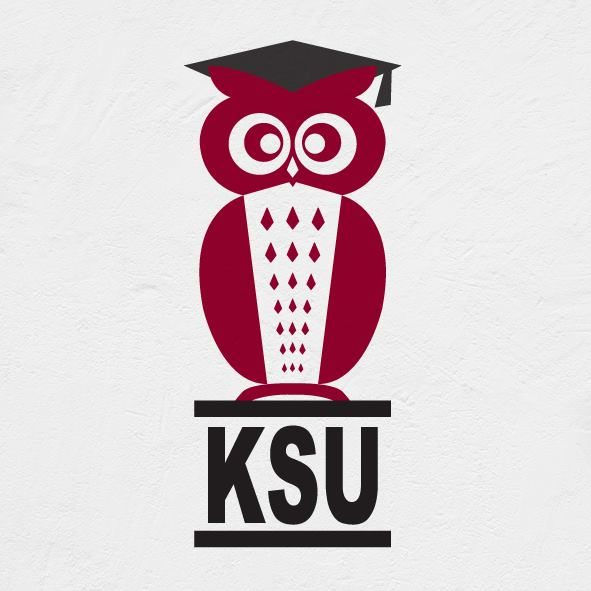
- Abbreviation: KSU
- Formation: 1901
- Headquarters: Msida, Malta
- Official language: Maltese, English
- President: Nick Muscat
- Affiliations: European Students' Union
- Website: ksu.org.mt
- Formerly called: Comitato Permanente Universitario

The University Students' Council (Maltese: Kunsill Studenti Universitarji), also known in abbreviation as KSU, is a Maltese national students' union. It is the oldest extant student organization in Europe. The KSU was established by Arturo Mercieca (1878-1969), later Chief Justice Sir Arturo Mercieca (1924-1940), in 1901 as the Comitato Permanente Universitario, also previously known as University Permanent Committee. The students union is involved in students' national and international politics.

The KSU represents Maltese students on a national and international level who attend:

- The University of Malta
- The G. F. Abela Junior College
- The Medical School
- The Malta Centre for Restoration.

== History ==
The student organization 'Kunsill Studenti Universitarji' (KSU) was founded in 1901.

=== Students' contribution ===
The organization promotes and recognizes students contributions, given at the University of Malta and other related education institutions, which represents. KSU is a forum where students may express their opinion not related to their studies. The KSU gives an opportunity to contribute to the University of Malta.

=== Electoral system ===
The electoral system is a first past the post one, whereby a block vote winning the majority of votes elects all its candidates, to the executive committee. This brought a system of block-voting between student organisations.

== Aims ==
The KSU is an evolving organization. It finds its roots in a set of simplified objectives. Over the past century, since its foundation, the KSU has been working to:

- Represent students in whatever issues concern them, whether it is on a national or international level;
- Serve as an official link between students and the relevant authorities;
- Achieve the democratisation of education in Malta;
- Coordinate the activities with other organizations;
- Cultivate an interest in students in the fields of education, socio-political and cultural issues and
- Assuring the highest possible quality level in Higher Education.

=== European Students' Union ===
On an international level, KSU is a full member of European Students' Union (ESU), the international union of students in Europe. The ESU represesents 45 National Unions of Students in 34 European countries, including KSU. It represents over 10 million students European students. It is regarded by the European Commission, the Council of Europe, UNESCO, the Bologna Follow-up Group, the European University Association (EUA) and various other stakeholders in education as being the leading representative voice of students in Europe. Throughout the years various Maltese Students have formed part of ESU Committees. KSU is an official founding member of MEDNET (Mediterranean Network of Student Representatives).

== Freshers' Week ==
Since 2007 the KSU welcomes freshers (students) on campus at the start of every new academic year at the University of Malta. Every year the KSU encourages students to visit the University campus to meet their course mates, check out the company stands and get freebies.

== Library hours ==
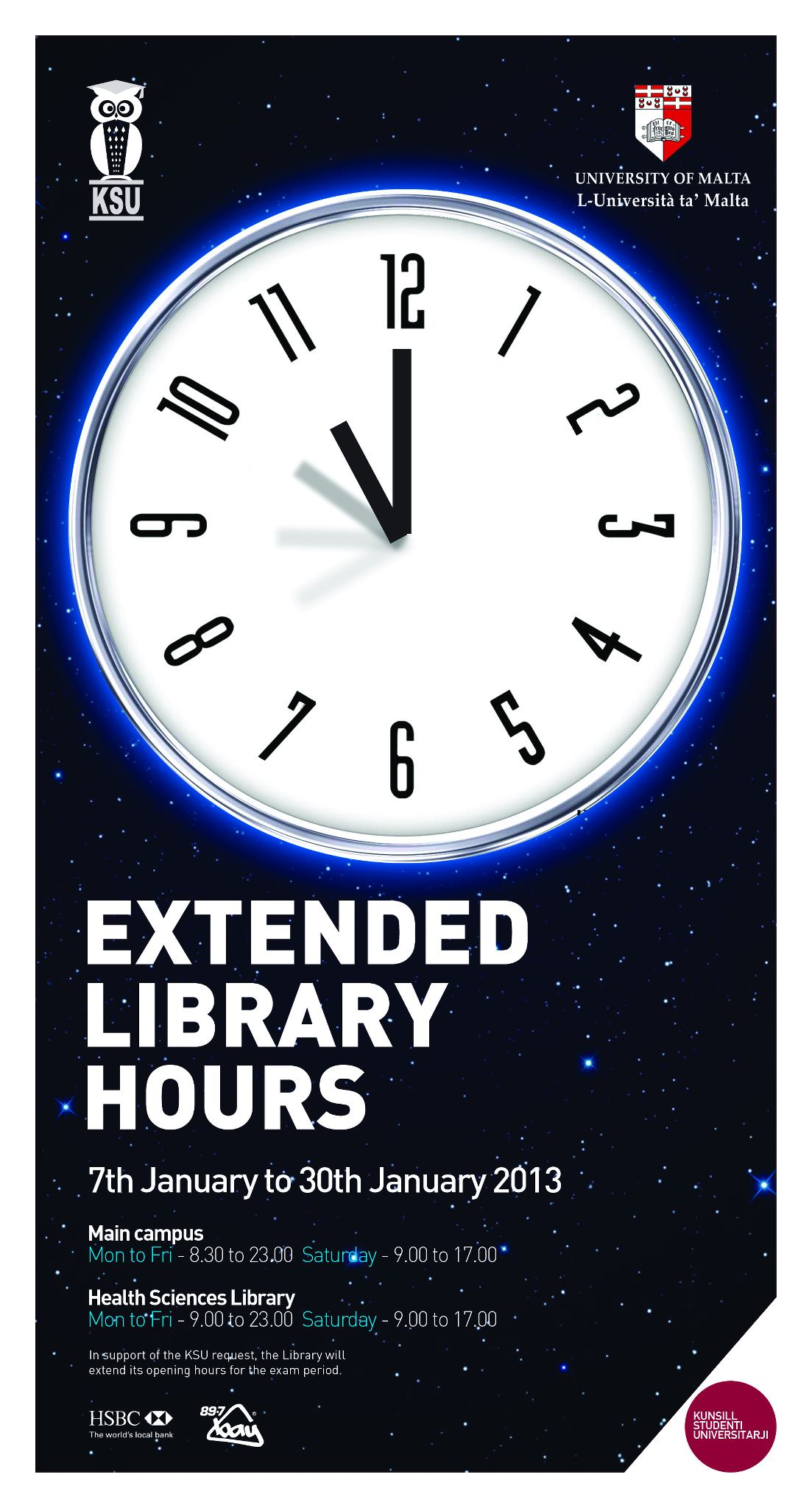
Extended Library Hours in 2013

The library of University of Malta, in collaboration with the KSU's proposal, launched its extended hours to facilitate students with their studies. In 2013, the library hours were extended for the Health Sciences library, to increase the study areas available and accommodate more students.

== Student organisations ==
The following is a list of students organizations at the University of Malta:

- 1-Up Club - University Pop Culture Society
- +9 Studenti
- AEGEE-Valletta - The European Students' Forum
- ASA - Arts Students’ Association
- ASCS - Association of Students of Commercial Studies
- Betapsi - Psychology Students' Association
- CommA - Communications Students' Association
- CSA - Criminology Students' Association
- DESA - Department of English Student Association
- ELSA Malta - The European Law Students' Association
- ESA - Earth Systems Association
- ESN - Erasmus Student Network
- ESO - European Studies Organisation
- Greenhouse
- GUG - Gozo University Group
- GħSK - The Criminology Students` Society
- GħSL - The Law Students' Society
- GħST - Theology Students' Association
- HOASA - The History of Art Student Association
- IAESTE - International Association for the Exchange of Students for Technical Experience
- ICTSA - Information Communications Technology Students' Association
- INSITE - The Student Media Organisation
- JCA - Junior Chamber of Advocates
- JEF Malta - Young European Federalists Malta
- Kite Factory
- KSJC - Junior College Students' Council
- LOOP
- MADS - The Malta Association of Dental Students
- MHSA - Malta Health Science Student Association
- MIRSA - International Relations Students Association
- MKSU - University Students' Catholic Movement
- MMSA - Malta Medical Students' Association
- MOVE - Progressive Students
- Moviment Graffitti (defunct from university)
- MPSA - Malta Pharmaceutical Students' Association
- MUFC - Malta University Film Club
- MUHS - Malta University Historical Society
- MUSC - Malta University Sports Club
- MUST
- OSQ – Organizazzjoni Studenti Qwiebel
- PULSE
- S-Cubed - Science Students' Society
- SACES - Society for Architecture and Civil Engineering Students
- SDM - Maltese Christian Democrat Students
- SĦS - Studenti Ħarsien Soċjali
- SIERA - Social Science Students’ Integrative, Educational and Research Association
- TDM2000 Malta
- TSA - Tourism Students' Association
- UESA - University Engineering Students' Association
- UMGS - University of Malta Geographical Society
- University Bible Group
- USTA - University Student Teachers' Association
- We Are - Students LGBT Organisation
- Y4TE - Youth For The Environment
- YouthCom - Youth & Community Studies Students’ Organisation

== Presidents ==
- 2026-Present: Nick Muscat
- 2025-2026: Gerard William Zammit Young
- 2024-2025: Luke Bonanno
- 2023-2024: Jeremy Mifsud Bonnici
- 2022-2023: Alexandra Gaglione
- 2021-2022: Neil Zahra
- 2020-2021: Matthew Xuereb
- 2019-2020: William Farrugia
- 2018-2019: Carla Galea
- 2017-2018: Robert Napier
- 2016-2017: Stephanie Dalli
- 2015-2016: Rebecca Micallef
- 2014-2015: Gayle Lynn Callus
- 2013-2014: Thomas Bugeja
- 2012-2013: Mario Cachia
- 2011-2012: Stefan Balzan
- 2010-2011: Carl Grech
- 2009-2010: Carl Grech
- 2008-2009: Roberta Avellino
- 2007-2008: David Herrera
- 2006-2007: David Herrera
- 2005-2006: Anthony F. Camilleri
- 2004-2005: Paul Gonzi
- 2003-2004: Justin Fenech
- 2002-2003: James Scicluna
- 2001-2002: David Gonzi
- 2000-2001: Karl Gouder
- 1999-2000: Claire Cassar
- 1998-1999: Jacques René Zammit
- 1997-1998: Emanuel Delia
- 1996-1997: Emanuel Delia
- 1995-1996: Reuben Seychell
- 1994-1995: Adrian-Mario Gellel
- 1993-1994: Anna Maria Darmanin
- 1992-1993: Louiselle Vassallo
- 1991-1992: John Grech
- 1990-1991: Claudette Pace
- 1989-1990: Stephen Attard
