= Adrian Dingli =

Chief Justice of Malta

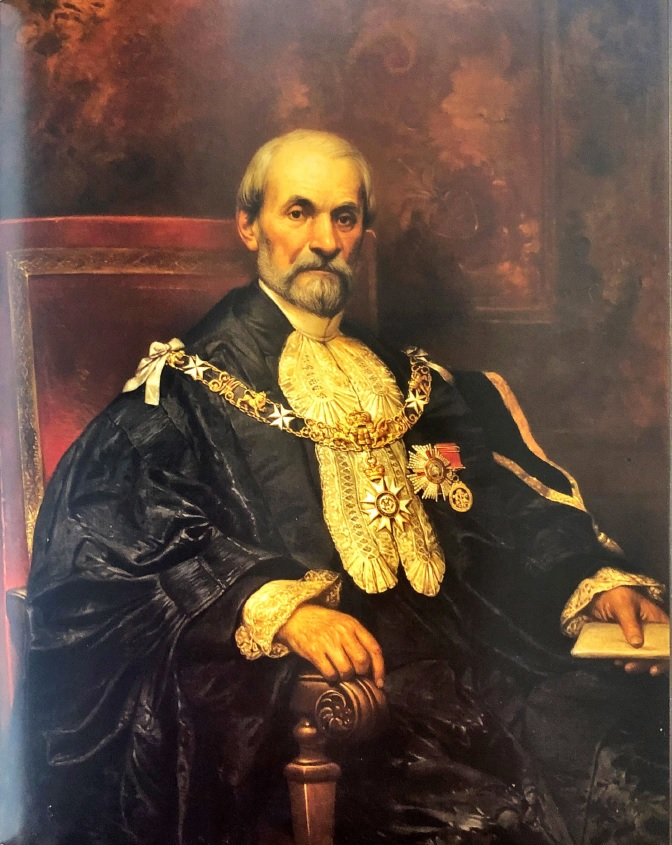
Giuseppe Calì, Portrait of Sir Adrian Dingli (1896)

Sir Adrian "Adriano" Dingli GCMG CB (8 October 1817 – 25 November 1900) was Chief Justice of Malta.

== Life ==
He was born in Valletta, the son of Sir Paolo Dingli, a lawyer who became President of the Court of Appeal. He studied at the Bishop's Seminary at Mdina and read law at Malta University, obtaining a doctorate in law in 1836 aged 19. He furthered his knowledge of languages and law in Rome, Bologna, Bonn, Heidelberg, Sorbonne and in London and then practised as an advocate.

Following the granting to Malta of the Constitution of 1849 Sir Adrian was one of the eight Maltese members elected to the Council of Government to represent the people. He was elected to represent the people of Gozo. In 1852 he established the Malta Militia. He was appointed Crown Advocate (1854) and in this capacity he effected the consolidation of the Civil Laws. He was also the Governor's consultant and the Government's administrator. He promoted the enlargement of the Grand Harbour and the building of the Market and the Royal Theatre in Valletta and the Lunatic Asylum in H’Attard.

In 1862 he went to Turin to negotiate an extradition treaty with Italy. During his time as Crown Advocate he laid down juridical doctrine, particularly in the sphere of civil law, by drafting and promulgating in 1868 and 1873 Malta’s Civil Laws in codified form. In 1880 he was elevated to the highest judicial office in Malta by being appointed President of the Court of Appeal, with the title of Chief Justice which had been abolished forty years earlier. He represented both the local and the Imperial Government on missions abroad on several occasions, including Cyprus where the Cypriots requested that he be appointed Civil High Commissioner. He became the de facto Governor of Malta. In all these activities, and on the frequent occasions when his advice was sought by the Government, his patriotic spirit and deep sense of social welfare were evident.

Dingli was married twice; firstly to Catherine Mamo-Mompalao (died 1857), and secondly to Amy Mildred Charlton.

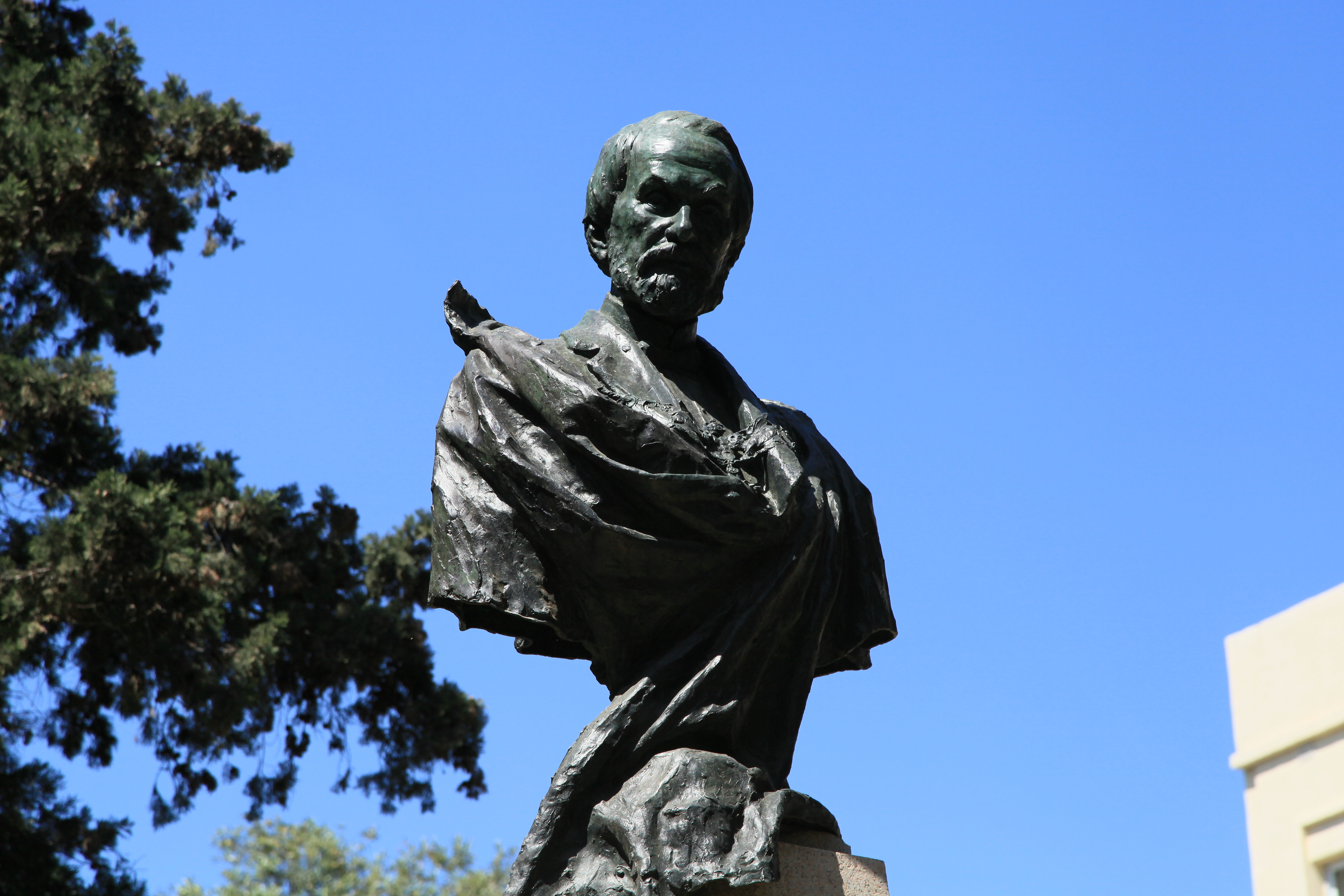
Bust of Adrian Dingli by Antonio Sciortino in The Mall, Floriana

Sir Adrian Dingli died on 25 November 1900, aged 83. A monument bearing his bronze bust by Antonio Sciortino was erected in the Mall, Floriana, and unveiled by King Edward VII in 1907. Various streets, squares and schools around Malta carry Adrian Dingli's name, and in 2003 the Central Bank of Malta issued a commemorative coin depicting a portrait of Sir Adrian, the third in its Distinguished Maltese Personalities Series.

== Honours ==
He was awarded the following honours :

- Companion of the Order of the Bath (CB, 1859)
- Knight Commander of the Order of St Michael and St George (KCMG, 1860)
- Knight Grand Cross of the Order of St Michael and St George (GCMG, 1868)
