= Paolo Dingli =

Chief justice of Malta

Sir Paolo Dingli GCMG was the chief justice of Malta from 1854 to 1859.
