= Giuseppe Borg Olivier =

Maltese judge

Sir Giuseppe Borg Olivier, GCMG (2 November 1755 – 21 February 1831) was a member of the Supreme Council of Justice of Malta from 1815 to 1818 when he retired.

== See also ==
- List of chief justices of Malta
