= Vincenzo Frendo Azzopardi =

Chief Justice of Malta

Sir Vincenzo Frendo Azzopardi CMG was the chief justice of Malta from 1915 to 1919.
