= Chief Justice of Malta =

Primus inter pares of the Maltese judiciary

Chief Justice of Malta Prim Imħallef ta' Malta
- Coat of Arms of the Republic of Malta

- Incumbent; Mark Chetcuti since 8 April 2020
- Style: His Honour the Chief Justice
- Appointer: President of Malta
- Term length: Until he attains the age of 65, resigns or impeached.
- Inaugural holder: Giuseppe Borg Olivier
- Formation: 1814
- Salary: €70,167 annually
- Website: http://judiciarymalta.gov.mt/the-chief-justice

The chief justice of Malta is the primus inter pares of the members of the Maltese judiciary and leads the business of the superior courts of Malta.

== Appointment ==
The chief justice is appointed by the president of Malta by a two-thirds resolution of the House of Representatives of Malta.

The Judicial Appointments Committee, which is in charge of recommending the appointment of the members of the judiciary, is not consulted on the appointment of the chief justice. This to ensure that the outgoing chief justice would not have a say on the choice of their successor.

== Duties ==
Where more than one judge is assigned to sit ordinarily in a court, or in a chamber or section of the court, the distribution of duties in general between the judges appertains to the chief justice. By virtue of his office, the chief justice of Malta is ex officio:

- Deputy Chairman of the Commission for the Administration of Justice of Malta.
- President of the Court of Appeal (Superior Jurisdiction)
- President of the Court of Criminal Appeal (Superior Jurisdiction)
- President of the Constitutional Court

The chief justice may designate one of the magistrates sitting in the inferior courts as Senior Magistrate, who shall perform such duties and functions as may be assigned to his by the chief justice himself.

If the office of Chief Justice is vacant or if the chief justice is for any reason unable to perform the functions of his office, then, until a person has been appointed to and has assumed the functions of that office or until the chief justice has resumed those functions, as the case may be, those functions shall (except to such extent, if any, as other provision is made by law) be performed by such one of the other judges of the superior courts as may be designated in that behalf by the president, acting in accordance with the advice of the prime minister.

== See also ==
- List of chief justices of Malta
