= Lon Kirkop =

Maltese novelist

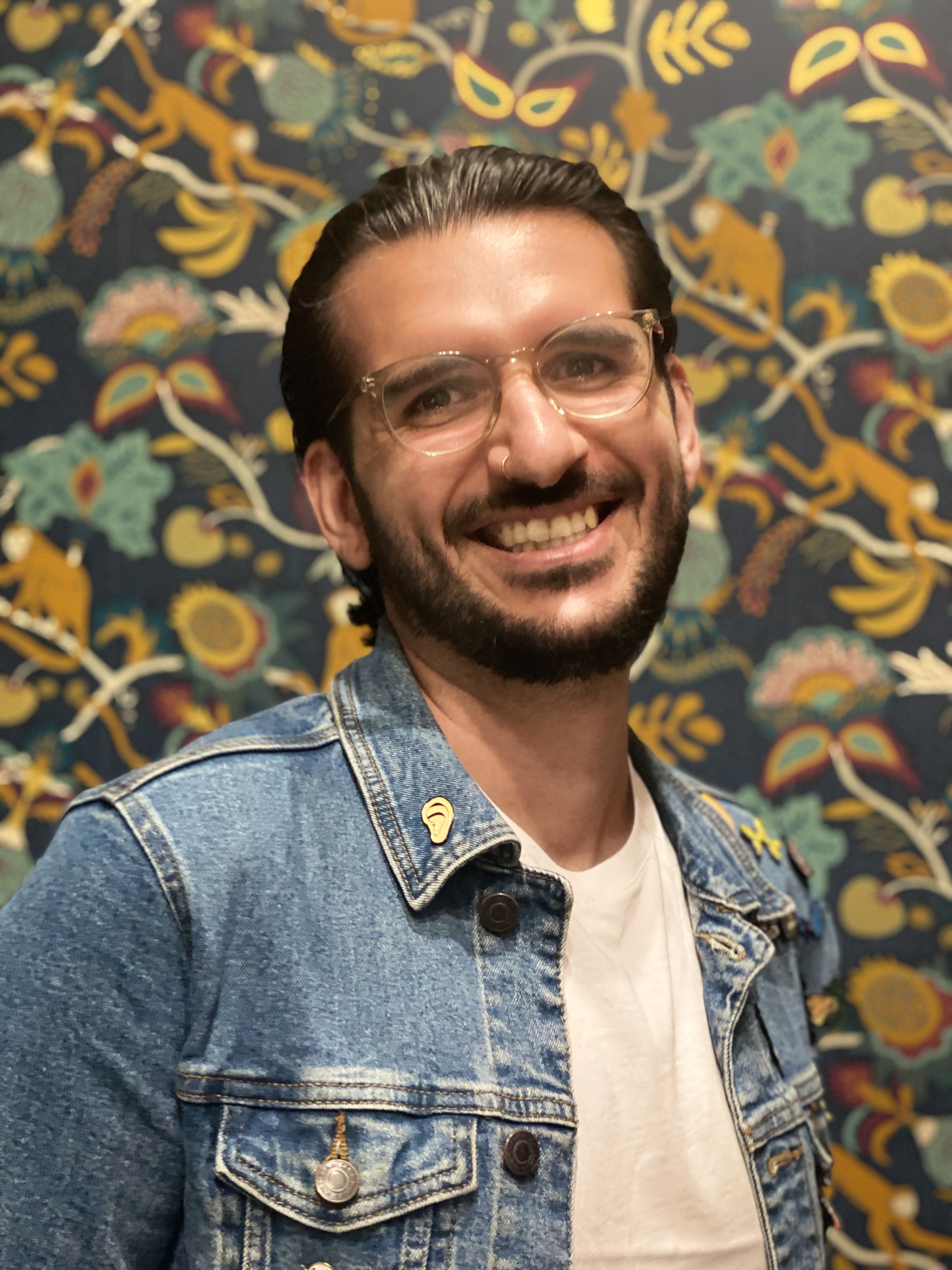
- Born: Marlon Chircop; 5 August 1991 (age 35)
- Occupation: Novelist / artist / singer-songwriter
- Years active: 2017–present
- Notable work: Mitt Elf Isem Ieħor: HappyVeganGirlJules, Fil-Ħajja Li Jmiss u Drammi Oħra tat-Triq
- Awards: Literary Contest Of Novels For Youth 2020, National Book Prize (Malta)
- Website: https://lonkirkop.com/

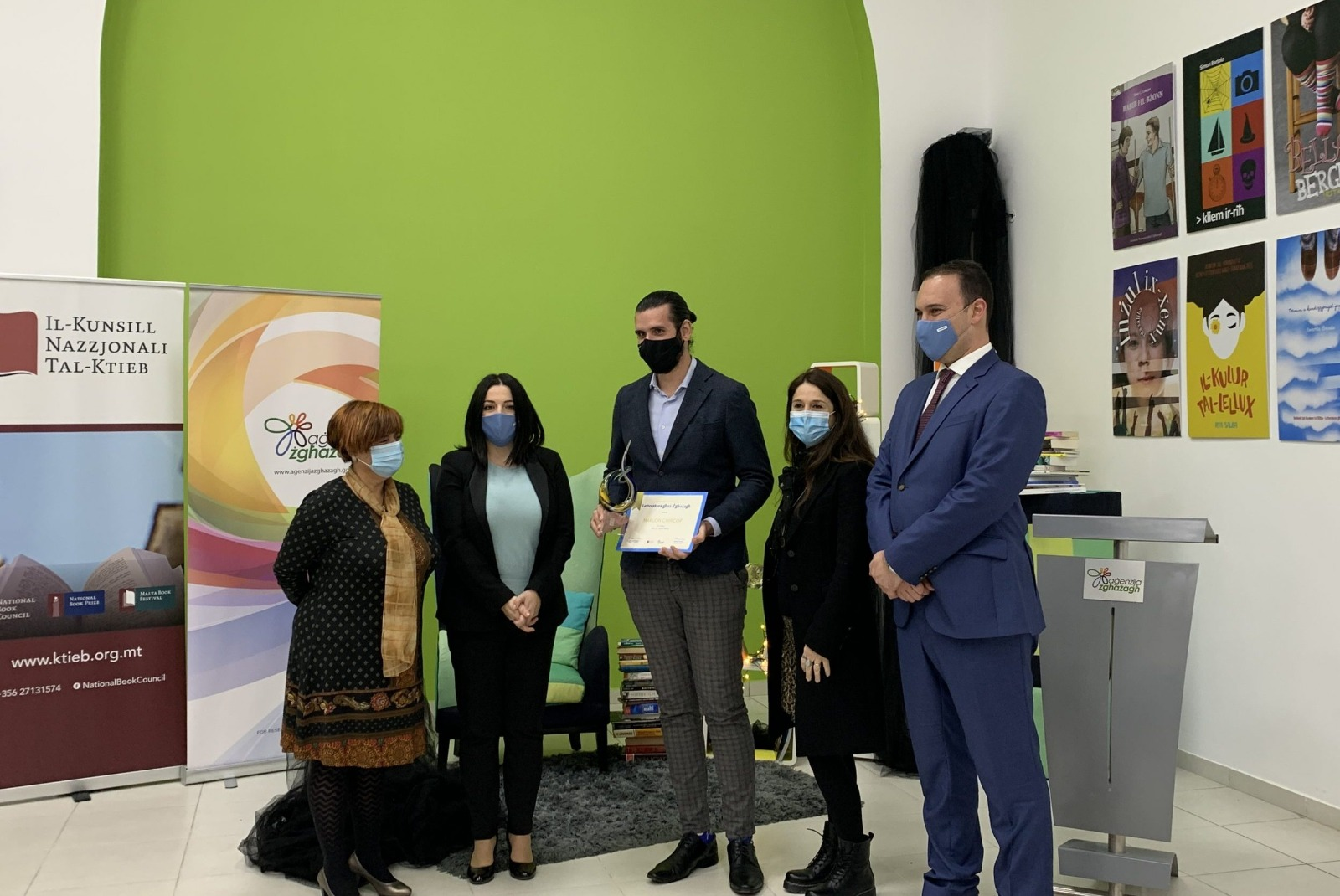
Kirkop receiving the award for his win of the 2020 edition of The Literary Contest Of Novels For Youth, with his novel Mitt Elf Isem Ieħor: HappyVeganGirlJules.

Marlon Chircop (born 5 August 1991), better known by his artist name Lon Kirkop, is a Maltese novelist, playwright, singer-songwriter and visual artist. He has received numerous accolades throughout his career, including two national book prizes: one in the Drama category for Fil-Ħajja li Jmiss u Drammi Oħra tat-Triq, and the Prize for Best Emerging Author. In 2020, he won The Literary Contest Of Novels For Youth 2020, organised by the National Book Council and Aġenzija Żgħażagħ, for his debut novel Mitt Elf Isem Ieħor: HappyVeganGirlJules. Additionally, he also won the prestigious Maltese song contest L-Għanja tal-Poplu as a composer and lyricist with the song Fil-Kexxun.

== Biography ==
Kirkop was born on 5 August 1991, in Malta. His love affair with art, literature and theatre dates to his childhood. Today he managed to find a way to incorporate all his passions into his continuously developing multidisciplinary work. Kirkop studied at MCAST's Creative Arts Institute and graduated with a B.A.(Hons) in fine arts, in 2017. In 2022, he graduated with an M.A. in printmaking at Cambridge School of Arts, UK.

In 2018, he had his first solo visual art show at La Bottega Art Bistro in Valletta, curated by Lily Agius Gallery where he exhibited a selection of layered mesh painting, a technique he invented himself through artistic experimentation, with a hard to define aesthetics. When in an interview was asked about his work's aesthetics, he replied:

"Most of the time my aesthetic changes according to the subject and medium used. Aesthetically, this series I’m presenting in this exhibition is so different to what I have produced so far that it is hard to define. However, textures and layers somehow always feature in my work, regardless of the theme. It is not always intentional, but I have to admit that I am obsessed with the notion of layering and exploring different materials."

From time to time, Lon join forces with another two visual artists Hannah Galea and Serah Stringer, who are collectively known as The Peculiars, and exhibit their work together tackling social and controversial subjects. In 2022, he was one of the selected artists for the Woolwich Contemporary Print Fair.

Kirkop debut as a playwright during the Cospicua Short Play Festival 2019 with three different plays: FIl-Ħajja li Jmiss (Maltese for "Another Life"), Limbu (Maltese for "Limbo") and Elektra, where he won best script writing for the play Elektra. Since then, he wrote his first young adult novel Mitt Elf Isem Ieħor: HappyVeganGirlJules (Maltese for "A Hundred Thousand Other Names: HappyVeganGirlJules") and won the Literary Contest Of Novels For Youth in 2020, and in October 2021, this novel was published by Merlin Publishers. The novel become an instant success not only with teens but also with adults and received positive feedback from both critics and readers, especially for its fresh voice, pace and provocative content. Kirkop's debut novel turned out to be a surprise hit during the Malta Book Festival 2021. In an interview with Times of Malta, Kirkop stated that he is not surprised that his novel is also proving popular with adults. He said "I cannot say I am surprised that it’s also doing well with adults. Although it explores the struggles of being a teenager in a world obsessed with social media, it’s also about relationships between family members and friends while touching upon social issues that affect many people irrelevant of their age."

On the novel, the Maltese blogger/book reviewer Robert Pisani from The Bobsphere wrote:

“I’ve read quite a few novels about social media culture and behaviour. At this point, Mitt Elf Isem Ieħor is probably my favourite one.”

Lon wrote the lyrics of the song Fittixni, that was one of the Finalist in the song contest Mużika Mużika: Festival tal-Kanzunetta Maltija. The song was written with the Maltese composer Gilbert "Bibi" Camilleri and performed by Victoria Sciberras.

The song Fil-Kexxun, which he wrote both the music and lyrics for, won the 46th edition of L-Għanja tal-Poplu.

His second book Fil-Ħajja Li Jmiss u Drammi Oħra tat-Triq, a collection of short plays, was published by Merlin Publishers on the 27th of September 2022.

Lon Kirkop was one of the selected artists at the Woolwich Contemporary Print Fair 2022 with his lithography print Out of Focus.

In the 48th edition of L-Għanja tal-Poplu, Lon debuted as a singer-songwriter with the song Straight. This song highlights his personal experience as a gay person throughout his life. Since its release, the song has gained significant traction, with many praising its quality and the realism of its lyrics. During the final night of the contest, held at Pjazza Teatru Rjal in Valletta, Lon won the Best Social Theme Award.

== Works ==
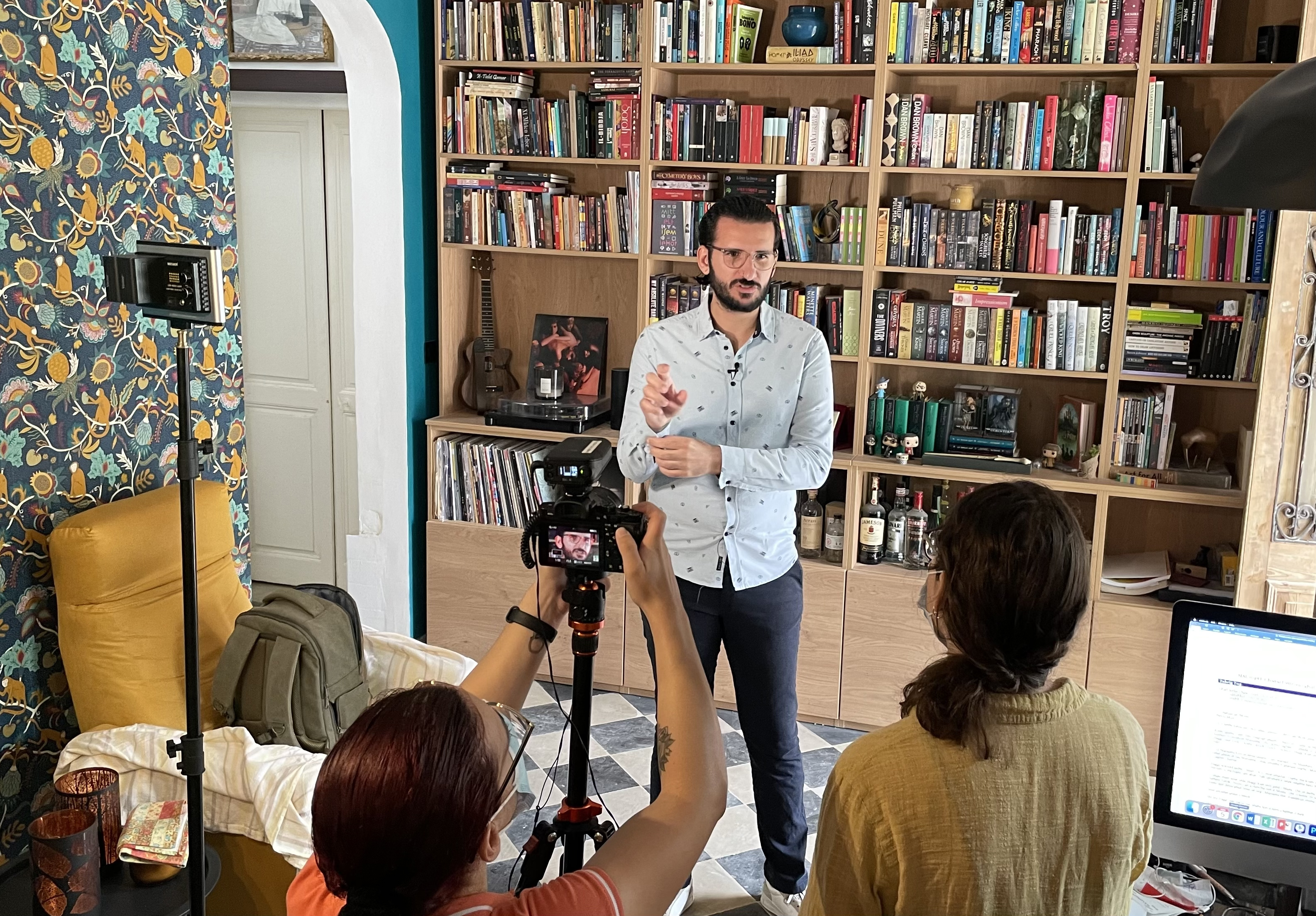
The author Lon Kirkop interviewed about his book Mitt Elf Isem Ieħor- HappyVeganGirlJules by the team of MaltArti

=== Publications ===
- Fil-Ħajja Li Jmiss u Drammi Oħra tat-Triq (Another Life and other Street Plays), 2022 – Collection of short plays
- Mitt Elf Isem Ieħor: HappyVeganGirlJules (A Hundred Thousand Other Names: HappyVeganGirlJules), 2021 – Young Adult Novel

=== Multidisciplinary Work ===
- Lura F'Ġuf Ommi (Maltese for Back Into My Mother's Womb), 2022 – lithography prints, music, poetry, projections and live performance
- Ċella ta’ Wieħed (Maltese for A cell for one), 2022 – this work is an iteration of the work Lura F'Ġuf Ommi.

=== Stage Productions ===
- Fil-Ħajja li Jmiss (Another Life), 2019 – short play
- Limbu (Limbo), 2019 – short play
- Elektra, 2019 – short play
- Liżar Roża (Pink Sheets), 2021 – short play
- 'l Alla ta' Wara l-Ħġieġa (The God of the Screen), 2021 – short play
- Passi mill-Kuritur (Steps from the Corridor ), 2021
- Fit-3pm (At 3 pm), 2023
- Sempreviva l-Musical, 2024 – a musical based on the book Sempreviva by Trevor Zahra. – Head of Scriptwriting

=== Songs ===
- "Fil-Kexxun", 2022 – music and lyrics (winner of l-Għanja tal-Poplu 2022)
- "Fittixni" (Search for me), 2022 – lyrics
- "Straight", 2024 – Singer-Songwriter

=== Visual work ===
- Out of Focus, 2022 – Lithography print
