= Vincenzo D'Esposito =

Maltese painter

- Born: 5 March 1886; Naples
- Died: September 1946 (aged 60); Novara
- Education: Giacomo D'Esposito

Vincenzo D'Esposito (Naples, 5 March 1886 - Novara 1946) was an Italian painter of watercolours, acting in Malta.

== Biography ==
Son of painter Giacomo D'Esposito and his Neapolitan-Spanish wife, Maria Consuelo Yovine, Vincenzo settled in Malta with his parents at the tender age of 6 months. He grew up in Ħamrun, and was not fluent in Italian language, albeit remaining a subject of the Kingdom of Italy for all his life. He married a Maltese girl, Elizabetta Marchetti (?), with whom he had six children; they lived in Strada Curmi, Ħamrun.

D'Esposito also played for the Società Musicale San Giuseppe, the parish band club of Hamrun, for which he was also deputy treasurer (assistente cassiere).

In 1940, at the start of the war, as a subject of an enemy state, despite having lived in Malta all his life, D'Esposito was deported by the British authorities aboard the S.S. Alicia to Sicily, which was a trauma for the ageing painter, who could barely speak Italian.

The D'Esposito family were settled in Bellinzano, near Novara. In 1944, a son of his died when the Nazi occupiers rounded up workers to be deported to labour camps in Germany. After the liberation of Italy in May 1945, D'Esposito used to travel to the Swiss city of Lugano to sell his watercolours. He died in September 1946, never having been able to travel back to Malta.

His widow died a decade later, in December 1956. Their children and descendants are since settled in the Novara area

== Works ==
Views of Valletta, ca. 1930

D'Esposito's earliest watercolours are dated 1908, when he was 22. He exposed his works for sale in the studio of painter Gianni Bonello (1858–1920) in South Street, Valletta. He produced a vast number of watercolours and gouaches in the style of Gerolamo Gianni. These were also issued in three series as postcards:

- John Critien included D’Esposito in his 1915s ‘Malta Pictures Series’, with landscapes and marine views. The second series, from the 1920s, shows Gozo and fishing boats in delicate hues.
- The Central Library (65, Strada San Marco, Valletta) issued 12 postcards, also titled ‘Malta Pictures Series’, with marine by D'Esposito showing his technical prowess in reworking as paintings the pre-war photographs by Edward Alfred Gouder.
- The third set was issued by the Charing Cross Stationery (70, South Street, Valletta) around 1930, with tourist themes in freer style, with views of Grand Harbour, Senglea, Mosta, Fort St Angelo, Valletta, the Sliema Chalet, Marsamuscetto.

According to Giovanni Bonello, "Vincenzo D’Esposito proved to be an incurable romantic who repelled any contamination beckoning him from the new trends."

According to Dominic Cutajar, "D'Esposito's real theme - indeed his great over-riding passion - can best be described as the poetry of light, that links in one lyrical, often translucent dialogue, the ambivalence of sky and sea."

== Bibliography ==
- Dominic Cutajar, "Vincenzo D'Esposito (1886-1946) - Watercolourist", in: Liber Amicorum – Essays on Art, history, Cartography and Bibliography in honour of Dr. Albert Ganado, editors Joseph Schirò, Sven Sørensen, Paul Xuereb, pub. Malta 1994.
- Giovanni Bonello, In pictures: Vincenzo D’Esposito’s romantic postcards, Times of Malta, 3 August 2026
