= Mario Buhagiar =

Maltese art historian (1945–2026)

Mario Buhagiar FSA
- Born: 4 January 1945
- Died: 28 February 2026 (aged 81)
- Education: University of London

Mario Buhagiar (4 January 1945 – 28 February 2026) was a Maltese art historian and author who was a Fellow of the Society of Antiquaries of London (FSA) and member of the National Order of Merit (MOM). He was a professor in history of art at the University of Malta and was for 25 years head of the History of Art Department, which he founded.

== Career ==
Buhagiar introduced history of art as an academic discipline at the University of Malta in 1988 and saw it grow into a fully fledged department which he directed for several years producing in the process a cohort of art historians who now occupy the key posts of Malta's heritage and cultural institutions.

On the attainment of his first degree from the University of London, he was first attached to the Maltese National Museums Department where, with the support of the Council for Cultural Cooperation of the Council of Europe, he pioneered the drawing up of a Protective Inventory of the Maltese Cultural Heritage. He also served as president and vice-president of the Malta Historical Society.

In 1968, he was founder with George Serracino-Inglott of the Youth Section of Din L-Art Helwa and was responsible for the discovery of and initial rehabilitation programme of the Late Medieval Church of the Annunciation at Hal Millieri.

Buhagiar was the author of specialised books and studies on art and archaeology, and he has read papers on art historical and related topics in various international seminars and been guest lecturer in several universities and Fine Arts Institutions in Europe. His areas of specialisation are Maltese Early Christian Art and Archaeology, Medieval Art and Antiquaries, and the Art and Architecture of the Knights of St John. His art historical and archaeological studies have established the European context for Maltese art history and medieval archaeology and has provided scholars with the essential framework for the future development of research on the subject.

He was together with Associate Professor Charlene Vella studying Renaissance paintings in Malta and securing funds together in order to conserve and restore these paintings. They started by studying a painting of the Madonna adoring the Child in Żejtun attributed to Antonio de Saliba in 2011 and proceeded with two paintings by Antonio de Saliba dated to 1510–15 in the Franciscan Observant church of Santa Maria de Gesù in Rabat, Malta, portraying the Madonna and Child with Angels and the Deposition from the Cross between 2013 and 2014. The last one of these panels they studied was Salvo d'Antonio's 1510 predella from the Mdina Cathedral Museum collection.

Between 12 January and 27 February 2026, the University of Malta Library held an exhibition of documents from his personal special collection, which he had donated over three years. The collection, built from his research library, spans Early Christian art, architecture and urban studies, local ecclesiastical history and parishes, and Maltese language, literature and folklore.

== Death ==
Buhagiar died on 28 February 2026, at the age of 81.

== Publications ==
with G. Serracino Inglott, The Annunciation Siculo-Norman Church Hal Millieri, Żurrieq (typescript). Malta, 1968 [reserved]. St Catherine of Alexandria: Her Churches, Paintings and Statues in the Maltese Islands. Malta, 1979.

Marian Art During the 17th and 18th Centuries, ed. M. Buhagiar (Malta, 1983). [‘Editorial Preface’, ‘Late Medieval Marian Art in Malta’, ‘The Ex-Voto as a Reflection of Folklore and Social History –Marian Votive Paintings in Malta in the Seventeenth and Eighteenth Centuries’, Catalogue Entries].

Late Roman and Byzantine Catacombs and Related Burial Places in the Maltese Islands. Oxford,1986.

The Iconography of the Maltese Islands 1400–1900: Painting. Malta, 1988.

Birgu. A Maltese Maritime City (2 vols), Mario Buhagiar, Lino Bugeja, Stanley Fiorini (eds). Malta, 1993. [“Editorial Preface”, “The Artistic Heritage]. with S. Fiorini, Mdina the Cathedral City of Malta. A reconsideration of its history and a critical appreciation of its architecture and works of art (2 vols). Malta, 1996.

Essays on the Knights and Art and Architecture in Malta 1500–1798. Malta, 2009.

The Late Medieval Art and Architecture of the Maltese Islands. Malta, 2005.

The Christianisation of Malta. Catacombs, Cult Centres and Churches in Malta to 1530. Oxford, 2007.

Antonio Buhagiar 1906–1998. Portrait of a Neglected Artist. Malta, 2008.

Essays on the Archaeology and Ancient History of The Maltese Islands: Bronze Age to Byzantine. Malta, 2014.

The Brush of the Evangelist: and Other Essays on Art in Malta, Midsea Books, Malta, 2025.

== Honours ==
In 2009 Mario Buhagiar was elected fellow of the Society of Antiquaries of London for his work in pioneering the study of Art History in Malta and for his significant contributions to early Christian, Byzantine and medieval art and archaeology. He is the second member of the academic staff of the University of Malta to receive the Fellowship of the Society, the other being Prof. Anthony Bonanno who was elected in 2002. On Republic Day 2012, he was elected as a member of the National Order of Merit by the then president, Dr George Abela.

A book of essays edited by Charlene Vella with contributions by 39 academics was presented to Prof. Buhagiar on his 72nd birthday in 2017. At Home in Art: essays in honour of Mario Buhagiar published by Midsea Books contains contributions by Vincenzo Abbate, Joan Abela, John Azzopardi, Michele Bacci, Francesca Balzan, Alain Blondy, Anthony Bonanno, Giovanni Bonello, Anne Brogini, Keith Buhagiar, Martina Caruana, Donal Cooper, Roberta Cruciata, Maria Concetta Di Natale, Richard England, Mark-Anthony Falzon, Joe Friggieri, Anna Galea, John Gash, Carol Jaccarini, Helen Langdon, Anthony Luttrell, Roderick O’Donnell, Lawrence Pavia, Richard Reece, Mark Sagona, Dany Sandron, Giuseppe Schembri Bonaci, Keith Sciberras, Carmel Spiteri, Anne Swartz, Conrad Thake, Paulo Varela Gomes, Peter Vassallo, Charlene Vella, Roger Vella Bonavita, Maurizio Vitella, Antoine Zammit and Theresa Zammit Lupi.
