= The Literary Contest of Novels for Youth =

The Literary Contest of Novels for Youth (Maltese: Konkors ta' Kitba Letteratura għaż-Żgħażagħ) is an annual contest organised by the National Youth Agency (Maltese: Aġenzija żgħażagħ) and the National Book Council (Maltese: Kunsill Nazzjonali tal-Ktieb). The 2020 edition of the Literary contest was won by the author Lon Kirkop with his manuscript Mitt Elf Isem Ieħor: HappyVeganGirlJules.

The contest is judged anonymously by three adjudicators appointed by the National Book Council.

== Winners ==
| Year | Book | Author | Ref |
|---|---|---|---|
| 2013 - 14 | X'aħna smart | Stephen Lughermo | |
| 2013 - 14 | Gramma | Leanne Ellul | |
| 2015 | Termini U Kundizzjonijiet Japplikaw | Roberta Bajada | |
| 2015 | Kulur tal-lellux | Rita Saliba | |
| 2016 | Stessi | Matthew Schembri | |
| 2016 | (Ri)ġenerazzjoni | Antoinette Borg | |
| 2017 | 360 degrees | Josianne Block | |
| 2018 | Karma Red | Mark Calleja | |
| 2020 | Mitt Elf Isem Ieħor: HappyVeganGirlJules | Lon Kirkop | |
