= Yana Psaila =

Russian-Maltese poet, linguist and translator

- Я́на Владисла́вовна Пса́йла
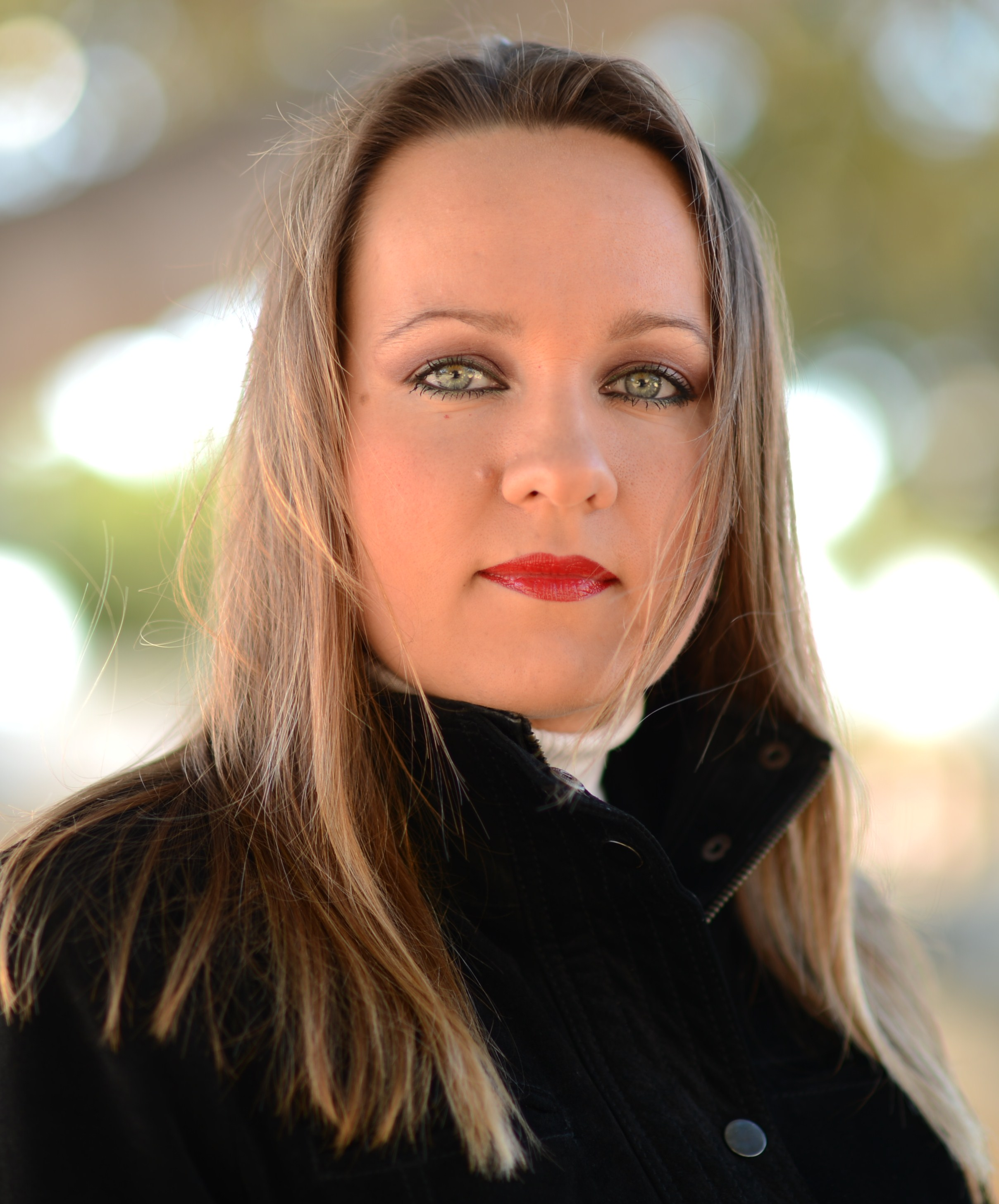
- Born: May 8, 1979 (age 47); Russia
- Citizenship: Malta

Yana Vladislavovna Psaila (Russian: Я́на Владисла́вовна Пса́йла; née Kirienko (Russian: Кирие́нко); born 8 May 1979) is a Russian-Maltese poet, linguist and translator. She is the first person to write phrasebooks between Maltese and Russian, and created the first translation of a Maltese novel into Russian.

== Career ==
Born in Russia, Psaila learned Maltese as an adult. She has written poetry since childhood, with her first work published in 1989. She is a graduate of Tomsk State University, where she studied linguistics and pedagogy. She is a poet, linguist and translator, who has written and published her own poetry in Maltese. Some of her work is included in the anthology studied by all Maltese students. In 2013 she featured as a poet at Malta Arts Festival.

Psaila is the first person to write Maltese-Russian and Russian-Maltese phrasebooks. The books respond to the differing cultural needs that visitors to the respective countries may have on the languages. She has translated works by Vysotsky, Pushkin, Pasternak and Yevtushenko into Maltese, and works by Dun Karm Psaila and Trevor Zahra into Russian. Her translation of Zahra's novel The Secret Life of Nanna Genoveffa is the first novel to be translated to Russian from Maltese. The translation took her three months to prepare. She is a member of the Society of Poets of Malta, a member of the Academy of the Maltese Language.

== Selected works ==
- Antoloġija tal-Poeżija Russa (2019)
- L-IMĦABBA TAL-ISTILLA POLARI (2015)
- Yana V. Psaila. "TRANSLATOR'S NOTES: POETRY OF VS VYSOTSKY IN THE MALTESE." Научно-практический журнал (2018): 90.
