= Mitt Elf Isem Ieħor: HappyVeganGirlJules =

2021 novel by Lon Kirkop

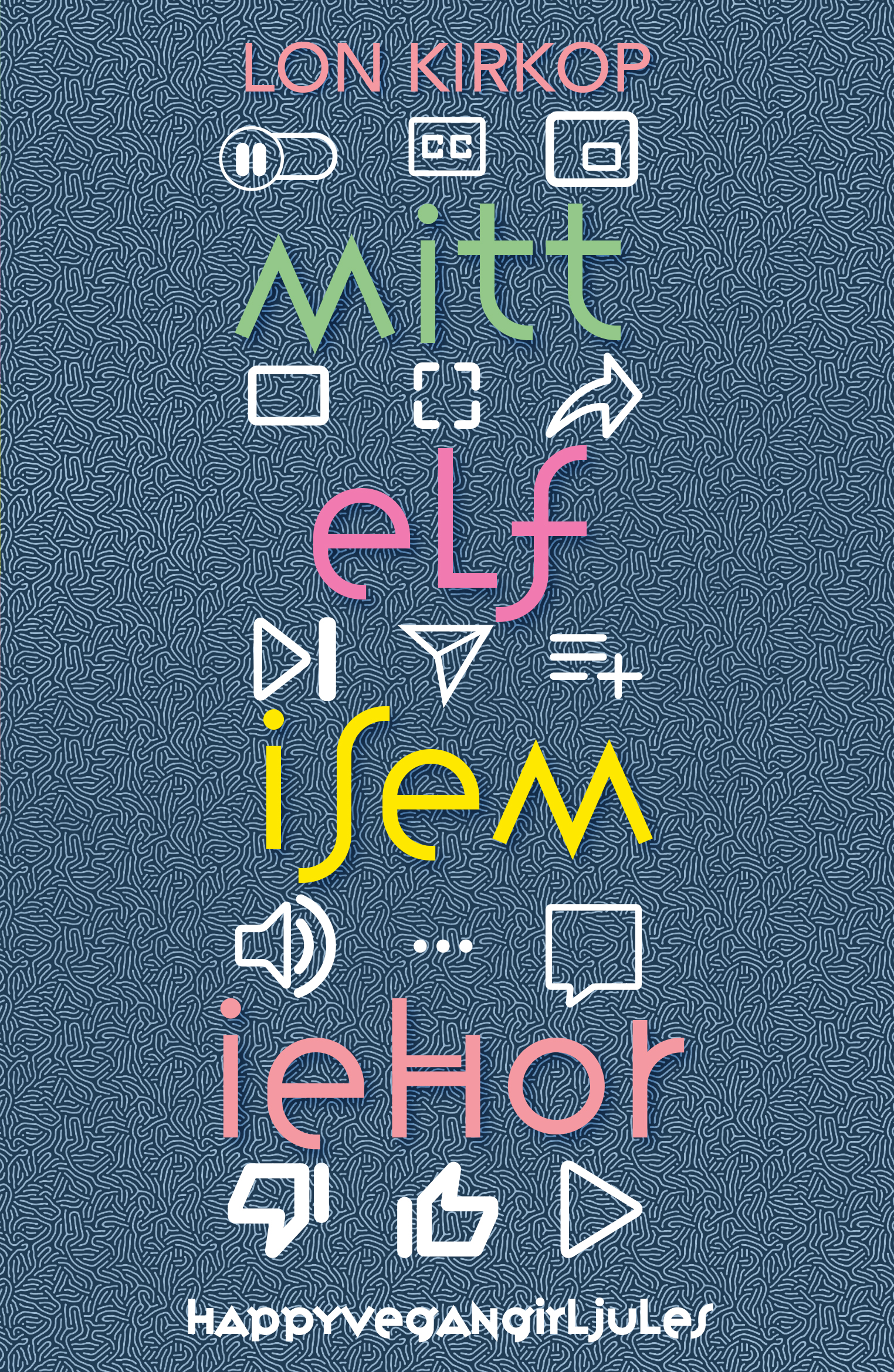
- Author: Lon Kirkop
- Illustrator: Lon Kirkop
- Language: Maltese
- Genre: Young Adult Fiction
- Publisher: Merlin Publishers
- Publication date: October 2021
- Publication place: Malta
- Media type: Paperback
- Pages: 160
- Awards: The Literary Contest of Novels for Youth
- ISBN: 9789990919646
- Website: https://www.goodreads.com/book/show/59477699-mitt-elf-isem-ie-or

Mitt Elf Isem Ieħor: HappyVeganGirlJules (English: A Hundred Thousand Other Names: HappyVeganGirlJules) is a 2021 young adult novel written by the Maltese author Lon Kirkop. This debut novel won the 2020 edition of The Literary Contest of Novels for Youth organised by the Malta National Book Council and Aġenzija Żagħżagħ. The novel become an instant success and was one of the hits during the Malta Book Festival 2021.

== Plot ==
The story follows Manda and Julia/Jules, two Maltese teens. Julia is a famous Maltese influencer, mainly famous for her YouTube channel Happy Vegan Girl Jules where she mainly upload content related to veganism. Manda is Jules number one fan. She copies everything that Jules does on her YouTube channel trying to compensate for the far from idilic life she has at home. This quickly leads to obsession and Manda's identity crisis.

Written with teenangers in mind, the novel tackles their fears, behaviours and relationships both within their social circle and online. It does not only speak their language when it comes to the writing style, but also the way the novel takes the form of social media posts, WhatsApp messages, YouTube videos and Vlogs.

"Iva, f'Jules għoġobni dak kollu li jien m'għandix. F'Jules għoġobni kollox għax jien m'għandi xejn."

— Manda Galea, in Lon Kirkop, Mitt Elf Isem Ieħor: HappyVeganGirlJules, pg.14

"Yes, in Jules I love all that I see missing in me. I love everything about Jules because I have nothing."

— Manda Galea, in Lon Kirkop, Mitt Elf Isem Ieħor: HappyVegan GirlJules, pg.14

“Imma mhux vera, jien ma nixtieqx inkun bħal Jules. Jien nixtieq inkun Jules. Nixtieq li kulħadd flok isejjaħli Manda, jibda jsejjaħli Julia, Jules jew b’mitt elf isem ieħor.”

— Manda Galea, in Lon Kirkop, Mitt Elf Isem Ieħor: HappyVeganGirlJules, pg.17

"But no, wait, I don't want to be like Jules. I want to be Jules. I want people to quit calling me Manda and start calling me Julia, Jules or any of a hundred thousand other names."

— Manda galea, in Lon Kirkop, Mitt Elf Isem Ieħor: HappyVeganGirlJules, pg.17

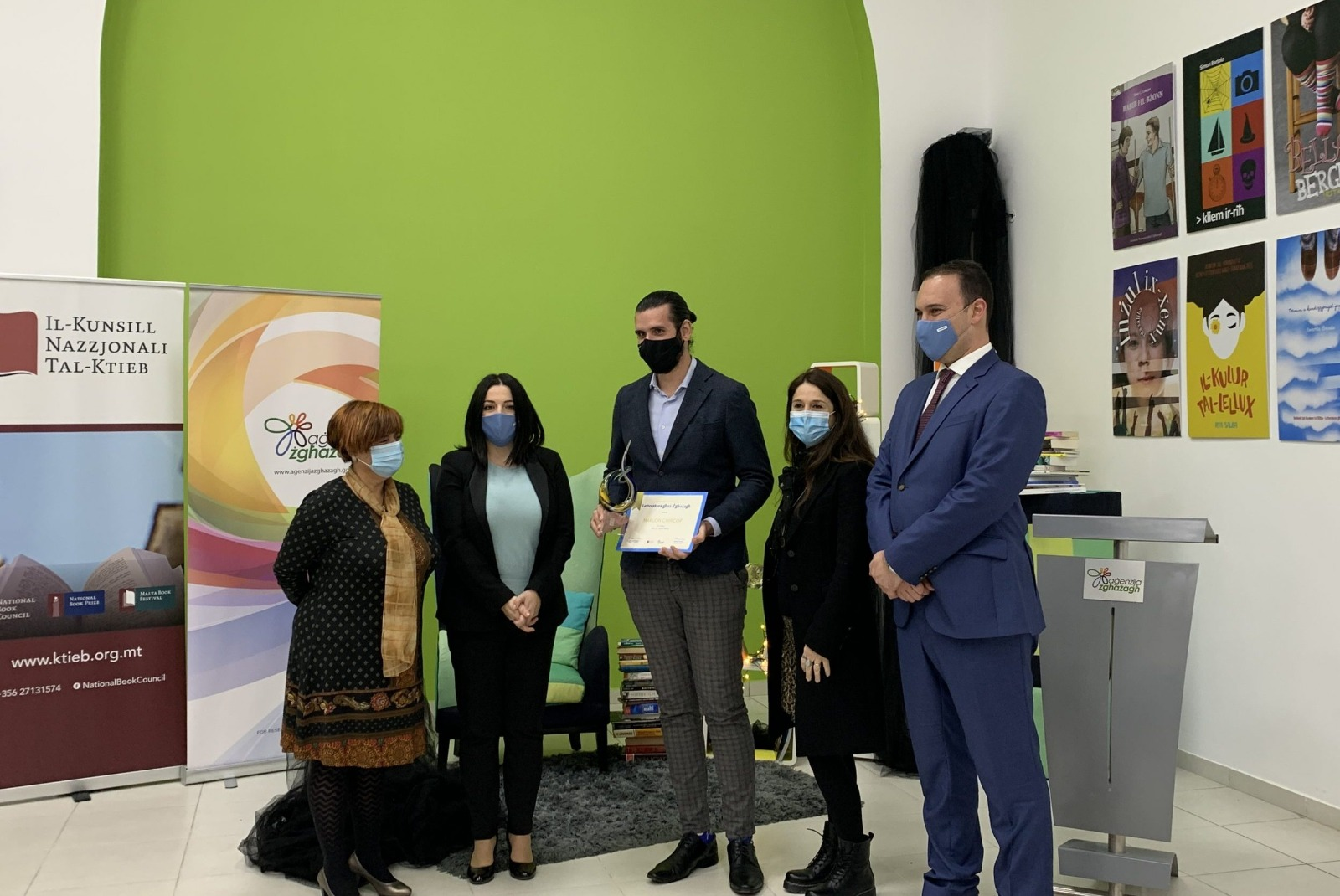
The author Lon Kirkop receiving the award for his win of the 2020 edition of The Literary Contest Of Novels For Youth

== Visuals ==
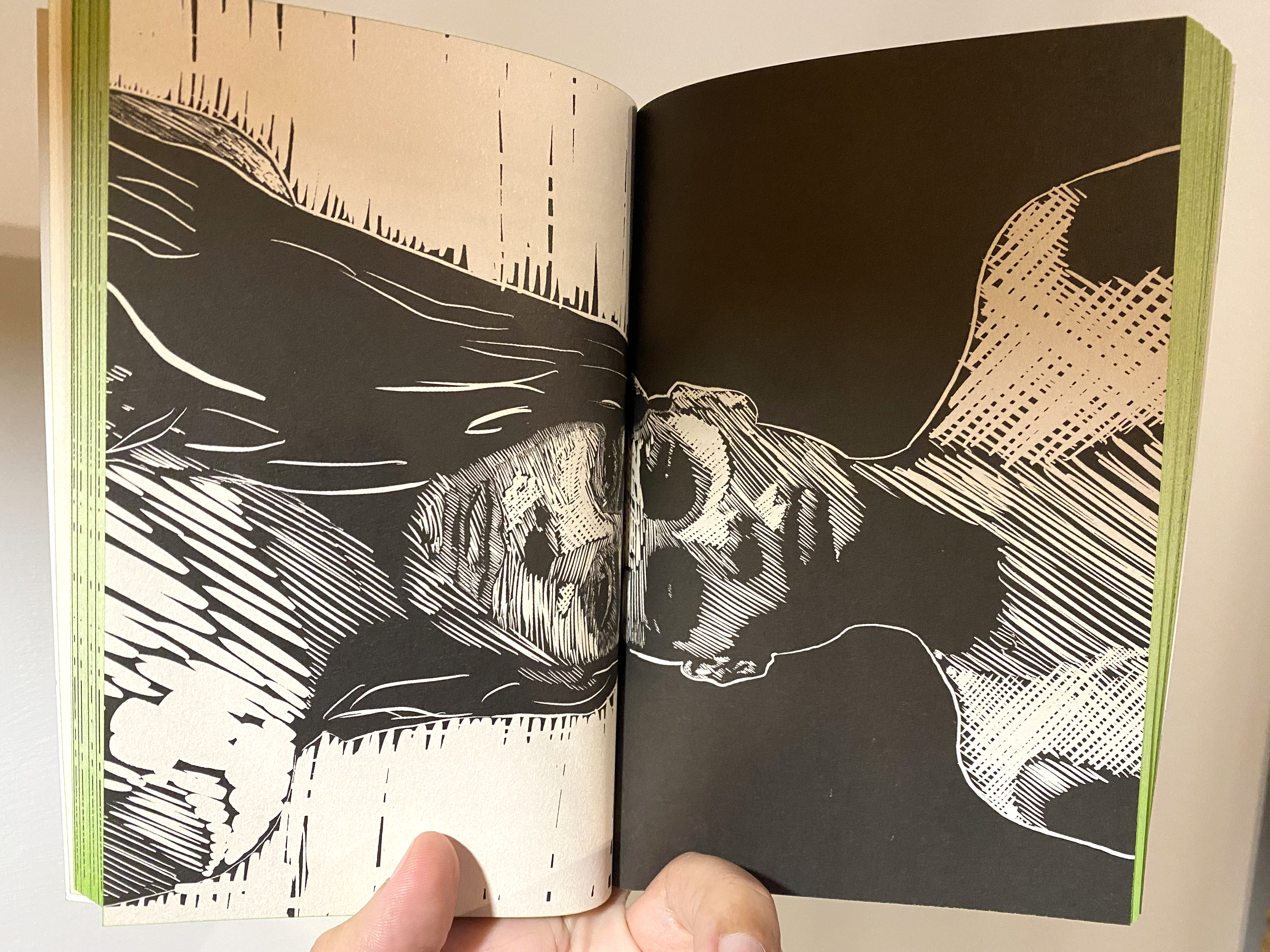
Mhux Manda Galea by Lon Kirkop

Kirkop worked with the Maltese artist Pierre Portelli on the visuals for the book. Together, they created a hybrid between the traditional book and social media feeds. The layout and the cover was done by Pierre Portelli while all the illustrations were done by Lon Kirkop.

== Awards ==
Mitt Elf Isem Ieħor: HappyVeganGirlJules (English: A Hundred Thousand Other Names: HappyVeganGirlJules) won The Literary Contest of Novels for Youth 2020, organised by the Malta National Book Council and Aġenzija Żagħżagħ.

== Reception ==
The novel become an instant success and was one of the hits during the Malta Book Festival 2021, with Critics and reading praising it for its fresh voices, pacing and provocative content.

Kimberly, A book blogger/bookstagrammer and a teacher, from OnceUponaMalteseReader, wrote:

"...it is a story that I can see a lot of students in it. As a teacher I can recognise the validity of the story and how faithful it is to real life."

Robert Pisani, in a review about the book on the Bobsphere, wrote:

"With Mitt Elf Isem Ieħor, Lon Kirkop gives the reader a glimpse of internet behaviour. Not only the falsity of the influencer’s world but also how teens use social media as an escape or to bully: one scene involves Manda being harassed through Instagram and Messenger, another one scene focuses on the nasty comments Jules receives from trolls on her channel. The book is an insightful one and, more importantly, opens the reader’s eyes to the more negative aspects of this cultural phenomenon."

The book was featured in some notable Maltese language news portals such as one.com.mt and Strada Rjali.
