= William D. Harding =

William D. Harding was a Maltese judge and the Grand Prior of the Grand Priory of Malta. His son was Hugh Harding, a chief justice of Malta from 1987 to 1990.
