= Malta Historical Society =

Non-profit cultural heritage organization in Malta

Melita Historica
- Discipline: History of Malta
- Language: English

Publication details
- History: 1952–present
- Publisher: Malta Historical Society

Standard abbreviations
- ISO 4: Melita Hist.

Links
- Online access

The Malta Historical Society is a non-profit society devoted to the recording and disseminating the history of Malta. The Alfred Mizzi Foundation currently financially sponsors the organization.

== Founding ==
The Malta Historical Society was founded in 1950 after a public appeal by professor Arturo Bonnici in Lehen is-Sewwa, the Catholic Action newspaper. Godfrey Wettinger and Albert Ganado were also founding members.

Bonnici was subsequently elected the first president. Other subsequent presidents include Seraphim Zarb, Vincent Borg, Godfrey Wettinger, Albert Ganado, Stanley Fiorini, Mario Buhagiar, Giovanni Bonello, Roger Ellul Micallef, and Theresa Vella.

== Programming ==
The Malta Historical Society supports current researchers and academics interested in the history of Malta through in-person and online conferences that are open to the public. The Malta Historical Society holds monthly lectures on various topics related to the history of Malta. It has given lectures at the University of Malta on topics like jewelry in Valletta, The Great Siege of Malta, and the social life of Rabat. It also publishes an annual magazine, Melita Historica.

The Malta Historical Society also hosts the biennial History Week that is free to attend for all. History Week provides a space for new research on Maltese history to be shared, and for awards to be given for emerging and established Maltese historians. Winners of the History Award are given an honorary certificate, a trophy, and a cash prize between €500-1000.

== See also ==
- List of lectures given by the Malta Historical Society at the University of Malta
