= Albert Ganado =

Maltese lawyer and historian (1924–2025)

Albert Ganado MOM
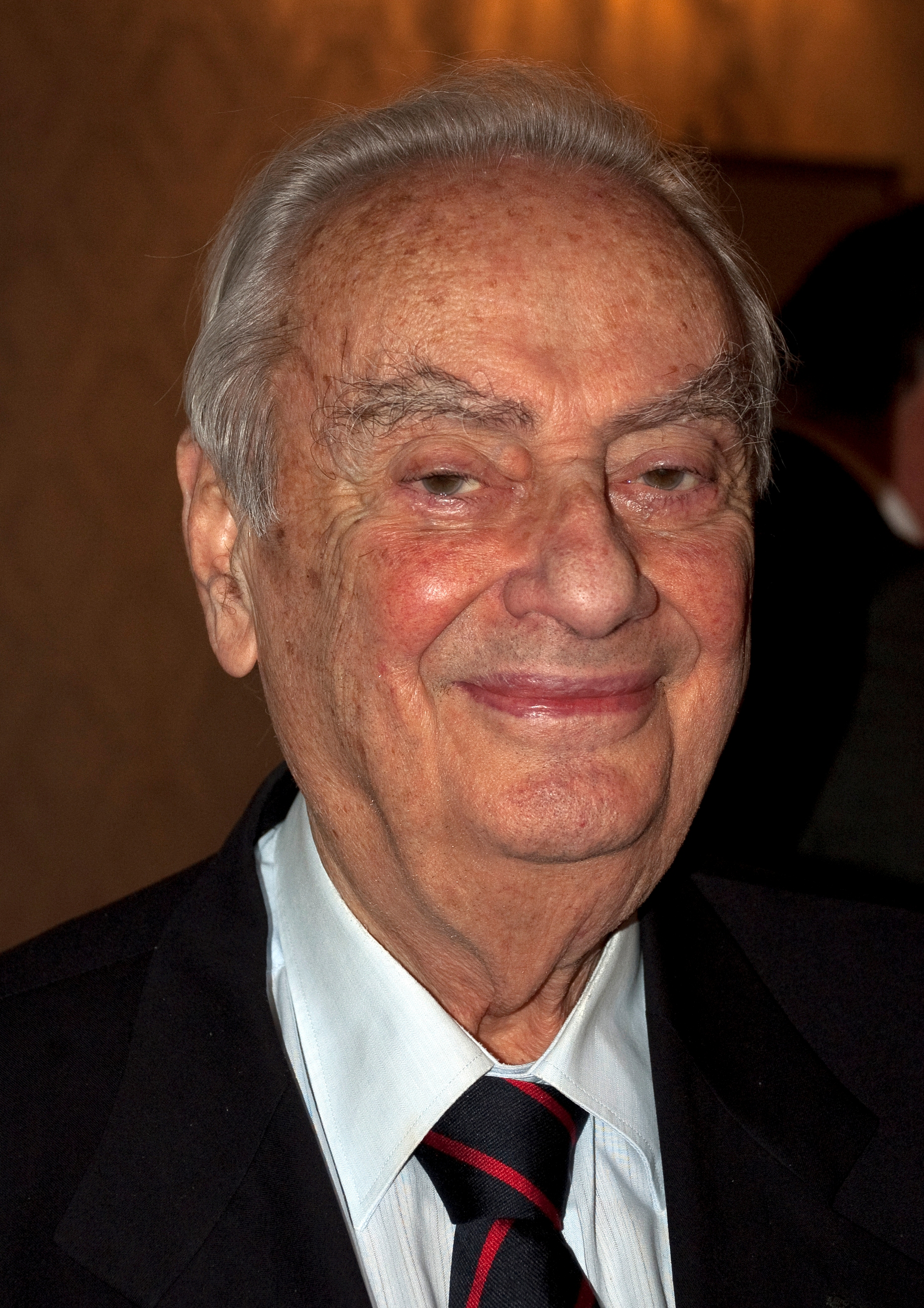
- Ganado in 2016
- Born: 9 March 1924; Malta
- Died: November 2025 (aged 101)
- Education: University of Malta
- Occupations: Lawyer, historian

Albert Ganado MOM (9 March 1924 – November 2025) was a Maltese lawyer and historian. He was a president of the Malta Historical Society and the founder and president of the Malta Map Society. He released his memoirs in 2020. Some of his publications won awards in different categories of the National Book Prize by the National Book Council.

Ganado turned 100 on 9 March 2024, and died in November 2025, at the age of 101.

== Honours ==
Ganado was appointed a Member of the National Order of Merit (MOM) on 13 December 1998.

== Selected publications ==
- Malta in British and French Caricature 1798 – 1815. Said International, 1989. (With Joseph C. Sammut) ISBN 1871684455
- A Study in Depth of 143 Maps Representing the Great Siege of Malta of 1565. Publishers Enterprise Group, 1994. (With Maurice Agius-Vadala) ISBN 9990900507
- Palace of the Grand Masters in Valletta. Fondazzjoni Patrimonju Malti, 2001. ISBN 9993210129
- Miniature Maps of Malta. Midsea Books, 2009. ISBN 978-9993272724
- German Malta Maps. BDL Publishing, 2011. (With Joseph Schirò) ISBN 978-9995733209
- The Brocktorff Mapmakers. BDL Publishing, 2012. (With Joseph Schirò & Claude Micallef Attard) ISBN 978-9995733735
- Malta in World War II: Contemporary Watercolours by Alfred Gerada. Midsea Books, [2018]. ISBN 9789993276166
