= John Cremona =

Chief Justice of Malta

John J. Cremona

Chief Justice of Malta
- In office 1971–1981
- Prime Minister: Dom Mintoff
- Preceded by: Anthony Mamo
- Succeeded by: Carmelo Schembri

Judge of the European Court of Human Rights in respect of Malta
- In office 1965–1992
- Preceded by: first judge from Malta
- Succeeded by: Giuseppe Mifsud Bonnici

Personal details
- Born: 6 January 1918 Xagħra, Gozo
- Died: 24 December 2020 (aged 102)
- Education: Trieste, Malta, London, Rome Sapienza

John Joseph Cremona KOM KM (6 January 1918 – 24 December 2020) was a Maltese jurist and poet. He was the Attorney General of Malta during independence talks in 1964 and the author of the Constitution of Malta. He served as the chief justice of Malta from 1971 to 1981. He assumed the functions of Head of State in an acting capacity several times, both as governor-general and president. He simultaneously served as Malta's first representative judge on the European Court of Human Rights from 1965 to 1992. Cremona was also a noted poet, writing in Italian, English, and Maltese.

== Early life ==
Cremona was born in Xagħra, Gozo on 6 January 1918. He held four doctorates: a Dr. jur. from the University of Trieste, an LL.D from the University of Malta, a PhD in law from the University of London, and a DLitt from Sapienza University of Rome. He did research in constitutional law at the London School of Economics and the Institute for Advanced Legal Studies of the University of London.

== Legal career ==
In 1943, Cremona was called to the bar in Malta. He was a Lecturer in the Faculty of Law at the University of Malta from 1948 to 1959, when he was promoted to Professor. In 1961, he became the Head of the department and a Member of the University Senate. Cremona also served as the Attorney General of Malta from 1957 to 1964, and became the Crown Advocate-General in 1964. In 1965, he was simultaneously appointed to three posts: judge of the Superior Courts of Malta, Vice-President of the Court of Appeals, and Vice-President of the Constitutional Court of Malta. He served as the chief justice of Malta from 1971 to 1981.

After Malta joined the Council of Europe in 1965, Cremona served as the country's first representative judge on the European Court of Human Rights for three consecutive terms, from 1965 to 1992. He was also the vice president of the court from 1986 to 1992.

== Public service ==
Beginning with the Constitution of 1959, Malta was granted greater home rule prior to independence through the creation of local legislative bodies. Cremona was a member of the Executive Council (1959–1962) and the Consultative Council (1962–1964).

He was the original drafter of the 1964 Constitution of Malta, and represented the Maltese government at the Malta Independence Conference in London in 1963.

After independence, Cremona advocated for the establishment of a native honours system, as Maltese citizens only had access to awards from the British Crown. He became the chair of the selection committee for the National Medal of Merit in 1967, which would be awarded through the Confederation of Voluntary Civic Committees. The first awards were conferred on 21 September 1968. Malta's Independence Day. Cremona later aided the government in establishing the Xirka Ġieħ ir-Repubblika.

In 1986, he became the chairman of the United Nations Committee on the Elimination of Racial Discrimination (CERD).

== Poetry ==
In the 1960s, Cremona served as Vice President of the International Poetry Society; Christopher Fry was the president at the time. Cecil Day-Lewis read one of Cremona's poems in a 1969 lecture at the Manoel Theatre, and Queen Elizabeth II read a commemorative poem by Cremona during the dedication of the Siege Bell Memorial in Valletta in 1992.

The English Association chose Cremona to be the Maltese contributor to their anthology Commonwealth Poems of Today (1967). The composer Charles Camilleri used poems by Cremona as the text of the War Cantata (2002).

== Honours ==
Cremona was a fellow of the Royal Historical Society. He was President of the Alliance Française organization in Malta, and a patron of the St Andrew Society (Malta).

Among his decorations were Companion of the National Order of Merit (Malta), Knight of the Sovereign Military Order of Malta, Knight of the Most Venerable Order of St. John of Jerusalem (United Kingdom), Chevalier de la Légion d'honneur (France), Knight of the Order of St. Gregory the Great (Vatican), Knight Grand Cross of the Constantinian Order, and Knight Grand Cross of the Order of Merit (Italy).

== Personal life ==
Cremona married Beatrice Crispo Barbaro (1927–2001) in 1949; they had two daughters and one son.

=== Death ===
Cremona died at the age of 102 on Christmas Eve 2020.

== Partial bibliography ==
=== Poetry ===
Cremona wrote poems in Italian, English, and Maltese:

- Eliotropi (1937, Italian)
- Songbook of the South (1940, English)
- Malta Malta (1992, English)
- Mas-Sebħ Għasafar (2004, Maltese)
- Ekwinozju (2006, Maltese)
- Poesie, Poems, Poeżiji (2009): poetry anthology covering all three languages
- Il-Kantiku tax-Xagħra (2012, Maltese)
- Poeżiji (2018, Maltese)

=== Law ===
- The Maltese Constitution and Constitutional History since 1813 (1st edition 1994, 2nd edition 1997)
- Malta and Britain: the early constitutions (1996)
