= Hugh Harding =

Chief Justice of Malta

Hugh W. Harding

Chief Justice of Malta
- In office 1987–1990
- Prime Minister: Eddie Fenech Adami
- Preceded by: Carmelo Schembri
- Succeeded by: Giuseppe Mifsud Bonnici

Personal details
- Born: October 17, 1925 Valletta
- Died: August 12, 2014 (aged 88)
- Education: University of Malta, London University

Professor Hugh W. Harding FSA FRHS (17 October 1925 – 12 August 2014) was the chief justice of Malta from 1987 to 1990. He was the son of judge William D. Harding and Lucy née Psaila Manché.

== Education ==
Harding studied at the Lyceum and came first in order of merit in the 1941 matriculation examination. He joined the University wartime Course of Legal Procurators and became Legal Procurator in 1943. Continuing his studies at the University he graduated B.A., in 1946 and LL.D in 1949. As first student in his course he was awarded the Government Travelling Scholarship and followed a postgraduate course in Law at London University (1949-1950).

== Academia ==
Harding was appointed Lecturer in History of Legislation at the Royal University of Malta in 1950 and he then carried out, as required by the said University, research work relating to Malta in the State Archives of Palermo and Naples during the period 1955-1957.

In August 1985, the Council of the University of Malta unanimously voted to confer the title of Professor upon Harding. In a letter detailing the decision, the University's Rector noted that the appointment was made to honour his significant contributions and service to the institution.

== Legal Career ==
Harding was called to the Bar in 1949. His's decades in private practice established him as a premier corporate legal counsel in Malta, heavily specialising in international commercial law and structural contract drafting. His primary professional footprint during this era was defined by his long-standing tenure as the chief legal advisor for the Malta Drydocks, the nation's largest industrial enterprise. In this role, he assumed responsibility for reviewing, structuring, and vetting complex international maritime and commercial shipping agreements. His technical scrutiny proved essential as the enterprise scaled operations, directly supporting commercial teams and managerial delegations in finalising high-value vessel construction and repair contracts with foreign entities.

== Judiaical Appointment ==
On November 17, 1980, Harding was appointed to the bench as a Judge of the Superior Courts of Malta. During his initial judicial tenure, he presided over cases in both the Criminal Court and the Civil Court, as well as sitting on the Court of Appeal.

In 1987, Prime Minister Eddie Fenech Adami nominated Mr. Justice Harding to the highest judicial office in the country. He took the oath as Chief Justice of Malta, succeeding Carmelo Schembri. As Chief Justice, he simultaneously presided over the Constitutional Court and the Court of Appeal. He held the office until his retirement in 1990, whereupon he was succeeded by Giuseppe Mifsud Bonnici.

== Publications ==
Beyond handling heavy industrial portfolios, his extensive legal expertise was channeled into systemic statutory development and constitutional analysis. He collaborated closely with other leading legal minds of his generation to dissect and deliberate on the foundational elements of the Malta Constitution during its crucial developmental phases. Parallel to his rigorous commercial practice, he maintained a profound commitment to documenting the evolution of the local statutory framework. This dual expertise in corporate practice and academic research resulted in historical texts that mapped out how external legal traditions interweaved with domestic governance.

His major analytical contributions are detailed across several key scholarly publications:

- "The Law Journal (Volume 1, Issue 6)" (University of Malta, 1947): An early, precise treatise analyzing the structural mechanisms and procedural boundaries of the Maltese criminal legal framework, explicitly detailing the presumption of innocence (semper praesumitur pro negante).
- Maltese Legal History Under British Rule (1801–1836) (Progress Press, 1968): A definitive, historical study tracking the transformation of the civil and criminal courts during the foundational decades of early British administrative governance in Malta.
- History of Roman Law in Malta (1950): An essential, referenced text analysing the deep-rooted influence of the jus commune and historical Roman jurisprudence on the codification of the modern Maltese Civil Code.
- "Law" in Culture and Identity (Ministry for Youth and the Arts, 1994): A comprehensive historical essay mapping how centuries of successive foreign dominations systematically molded local customs, legislative privileges, and statutory codification.
