= Roberta Bajada =

Maltese writer (born 1985)

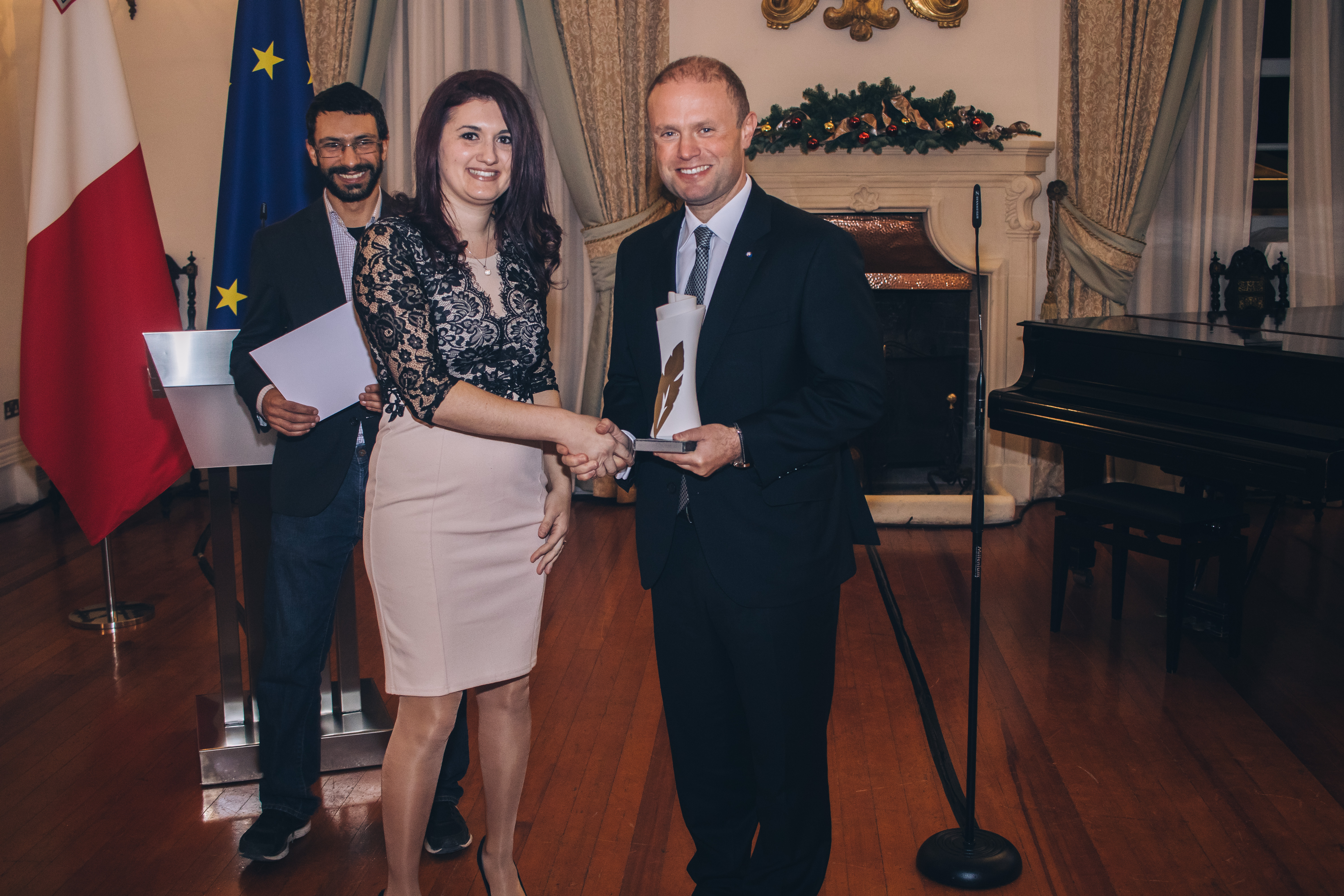
Bajada at the 2017 National Book Prize awards

Roberta Bajada (born 7 June 1985) is a Maltese writer of children's and young adult fiction, writing in the Maltese language.

== Writing ==
Bajada published an English-language book of short stories, What?! Another Book of Stories? in 2014, as part of a Malta Union of Teachers project to encourage children to read in schools.

Her novel, Arloġġ u Tila [Clock and Canvas] (2016), is an adventure story involving museums and 15th-century art. Termini u Kundizzjonijiet Japplikaw [Terms and conditions apply] (2017) concerns a young boy helping an elderly ghost to qualify for admission to heaven, and won the national Young Adult Literature award. Shadow Woods (2024) takes its title from the abandoned theme park which its central character had visited in his childhood.

Bajada has said that her favourite book written in the Maltese language is Trevor Żahra's Is-Seba' Tronġiet Mewwija [The Seven Wonders of the World], which inspired her to become a writer.

Bajada was one of the judges for the 2023 Novels for Youth Literacy Contest, organised by Malta's National Book Council and Aġenzija Żgħażagħ.

== Awards and honours ==
Bajada won the award for "Best emerging author" in the 2017 Maltese National Book Prize awards.

== Personal life ==
Bajada was born on 7 June 1985 in St. Julian's, Malta. She has undertaken postgraduate studies on the topic of "the relationship between art movements and literary texts in the Victorian and modern periods", and is a secondary-school teacher.

== Selected publications ==
- Bajada, Roberta (2012). Il-Ħolma tan-Nannu Ġuż [Grandpa Ġuż's Dream]. Kotba Sagħtar.
- Bajada, Roberta (2014). What! Another Book of Stories?. Fondazzjoni Sagħtar. ISBN 9789990964301.
- Bajada, Roberta (2016). Arloġġ u Tila [Clock and Canvas]. Merlin. ISBN 9789990915402.
- Bajada, Roberta (2017). Termini u Kundizzjonijiet Japplikaw [Terms and Conditions Apply]. Merlin. ISBN 9789990916409.
- Bajada, Roberta (2019). Arlekkin Isfar [Yellow Harlequin]. Merlin. ISBN 9789990918427.
- Bajada, Roberta (2024). Shadow Woods (in Maltese). Merlin. ISBN 9789918240548.
