= Carmelo Schembri =

Chief Justice of Malta

Chief Justice of Malta
- In office 1981–1987
- Prime Minister: Dom Mintoff, Karmenu Mifsud Bonnici, Eddie Fenech Adami
- Preceded by: John Cremona
- Succeeded by: Hugh Harding

Carmelo Schembri was the chief justice of Malta from 1981 to 1987.
