= Giuseppe Mifsud Bonnici =

Maltese judge and philosopher (1930–2019)

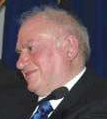

Chief Justice of Malta
- In office 1990–1995
- Prime Minister: Eddie Fenech Adami
- Preceded by: Hugh W. Harding
- Succeeded by: Joseph Said Pullicino

Judge of the European Court of Human Rights in respect of Malta
- In office 1992–1998
- Preceded by: John Cremona
- Succeeded by: Giovanni Bonello

Personal details
- Born: 17 July 1930 Cospicua, Malta
- Died: 21 February 2019 (aged 88)
- Education: University of Malta
- Occupation: Academic, jurist

Giuseppe Mifsud Bonnici (17 July 1930 – 21 February 2019) was a Maltese judge and philosopher, Chief Justice of Malta between 1990 and 1995. He mostly specialised in the philosophy of law.

== Life ==
Mifsud Bonnici was born in Cospicua, Malta, on 17 July 1930. He began his studies at the University of Malta from where, in 1958, he became Doctor of Law. Before that, in 1955, he was Malta’s chess champion. After graduating as a lawyer, he continued his studies in Rome at the Gregorio del Vecchio Institute of the Sapienza University of Rome. He began teaching philosophy of law at the University of Malta in 1966, and continued teaching for three decades, right up to his retirement in 1995. He was appointed Professor of the Philosophy of Law in 1988.

Also in 1988 Mifsud Bonnici was appointed Judge of the Maltese Superior Courts. Two years later, in 1990, he was made Chief Justice, and President of the Courts of Appeal and President of the Constitutional Court, offices he held up till his retirement in 1995. Meantime, in 1992, he served as Judge of the European Court of Human Rights in Strasbourg, a service he maintained until 1998. He was an Honorary Fellow of the Institute for Advanced Legal Studies of London, England.

== Works ==
Philosophically, Mifsud Bonnici was an adherent of the Aristotelian-Thomistic school of Scholasticism. Most of his published studies deal with legal matters, including fundamental human rights and freedoms. Rather technical in nature, these publications do not interest philosophy directly.

Of a different nature is his 178-page book, co-authored with Mark A. Sammut, Il-Ligi, il-Morali u r-Raguni (Law, Morality and Reason), published in 2008 (Ius Melitæ). The composition is basically a sort of dialogue between the two authors (alternatively, it is an interview with Mifsud Bonnici). It is divided in into five main parts dealing with a number of themes, from purely legal technicalities to philosophical topics. Though the style is quite loose and colloquial – with the discussion sometimes drifting into mere side observations – philosophical arguments are proposed for a number of subjects, such as bioethics, religion, matrimony (including same-sex marriage), freedom of expression, the administration of justice, and the like.

== See also ==
- Philosophy in Malta
