= 1964 Maltese constitutional referendum =

2–4 May 1964
- Do you approve of the constitution proposed by the Government of Malta, endorsed by the Legislative Assembly, and published in the Malta Gazette?

Results
Choice	Votes	%
Yes	65,714	54.47%
No	54,919	45.53%
Valid votes	120,633	93.05%
Invalid or blank votes	9,016	6.95%
Total votes	129,649	100.00%
Registered voters/turnout	162,743	79.66%

A constitutional referendum was held in Malta between 2 and 4 May 1964. The new constitution was approved by 54.5% of voters, and came into effect on 21 September 1964. It was effectively a referendum on independence, as the new constitution gave the country self-government.

The Progressive Constitutionalist Party led by Mabel Strickland boycotted the referendum.

== Question ==
The question put to the electorate was "Do you approve of the constitution proposed by the Government of Malta, endorsed by the Legislative Assembly, and published in the Malta Gazette?

== Results ==
Choice	Votes	%
For	65,714	54.47
Against	54,919	45.53
Total	120,633	100.00
Valid votes	120,633	93.05
Invalid/blank votes	9,016	6.95
Total votes	129,649	100.00
Registered voters/turnout	162,743	79.66
Source: Nohlen & Stöver
