= Constitution of Malta =

Supreme law of the Republic of Malta

Overview
- Jurisdiction: Malta
- Presented: 2–4 May 1964
- Date effective: 21 September 1964
- System: Unitary parliamentary republic

Government structure
- Branches: 3
- Head of state: President
- Chambers: Unicameral
- Executive: President
- Federalism: Unitary
- Electoral college: No
- First legislature: 1966
- First executive: 1974
- Last amended: 2020
- Citation: Malta 1964
- Supersedes: 1961 Constitution of Malta

The Constitution of Malta (Maltese: Kostituzzjoni ta' Malta) was adopted as a legal order on 21 September 1964, and is the self-declared supreme law of the land. Therefore, any law or action in violation of the Constitution is null and void. Being a rigid constitution, it has a three-tier entrenchment basis in order for any amendments to take place.

== Constitutional development since independence ==
The Constitution has been amended twenty-four times, most recently in 2020 with the entrenchment that firstly, the chief justice from now on shall be appointed by a resolution of Parliament – the legislature is appointing the member of the Judiciary – the Chief Justice. This resolution has to be supported by the votes of at least two thirds of all those members who are eligible to vote. The constitution is typically called the Constitution of Malta and replaced the 1961 Constitution, dating from 24 October 1961. George Borg Olivier was its main instigator and negotiator. It was drafted by then Attorney General and constitutional law expert J. J. Cremona, making Malta one of the few Commonwealth countries whose independence constitution was drafted by a local jurist.

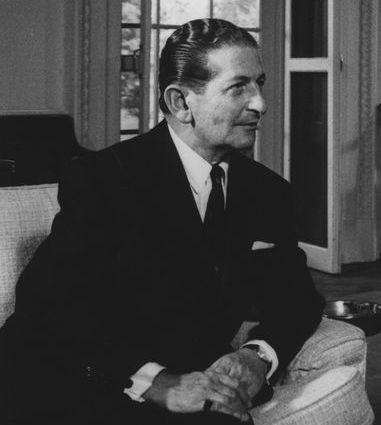
George Borg Olivier was the main instigator and negotiator of the Constitution

Under its 1964 constitution, Malta became a parliamentary democracy within the Commonwealth. Queen Elizabeth II was sovereign of Malta, and a Governor-General exercised executive authority on her behalf, while the actual direction and control of the government and the nation's affairs were in the hands of the cabinet under the leadership of a Maltese Prime Minister, the leader of the party that wins a majority of parliamentary seats in a general election for the unicameral House of Representatives.

On 13 December 1974, under the Labour government Dom Mintoff, the constitution was revised, and Malta became a republic within the Commonwealth, with executive authority vested in a Maltese President, who is appointed by Parliament and who in turn, appoints as Prime Minister.

The President also nominally appoints, upon recommendation of the Prime Minister, the individual ministers to head each of the government departments. The cabinet is selected from among the members of the House of Representatives. The Constitution provides for general elections to be held at least every five years. Candidates are elected by the Single Transferable Vote system. The entire territory is divided into thirteen electoral districts each returning five MPs to a total of 65. Since 1987, in case a Party obtains an absolute majority of votes without achieving a Parliamentary majority a mechanism in the Constitution provides for additional seats to that Party to achieve a Parliamentary majority (Act IV of 1987). To date this mechanism, intended to counteract gerrymandering, came into effect twice: for the Sixth and the Eighth Parliaments. A similar mechanism was introduced in 1996 so that additional seats would be given to that Party obtaining a relative majority of votes but not a parliamentary majority with only two parties achieving Parliamentary representation. This mechanism was first applied in the 2008 general election.

== The nature of the constitution ==
The Independence Constitution of Malta of 1964 established Malta as a liberal parliamentary democracy. It safeguarded the fundamental human rights of citizens, and forced a separation between the executive, judicial and legislative powers, with regular elections based on universal suffrage. It defines the Roman Catholic church as state religion and provision of religious education in compulsory education.

This constitution was developed through constitutional history and its evolution is partly modelled on the Italian Constitution. The constitutions of Malta fell under three main categories. These were:

- Those over which the British possessed total power;
- The intermediate genres of constitutions (1921-1947), where Malta had self government (the 1961 constitution was very similar to these constitutions);
- the Independence Constitution of 1964.

On 27 July 1960, the Secretary of State for the Colonies declared to the British House of Commons the wish of Her Majesty's Government to reinstate representative government in Malta and declare that it was now time to work out a new constitution where elections could be held as soon as it was established. The Secretary, Iain Macleod, also notified the House of the appointment of a Constitutional Commission, under the chairmanship of Sir Hilary Blood, to devise thorough constitutional schemes after consultation with representatives of the Maltese people and local interests.

The Commissioners presented their report on 5 December 1960. The report was published on 8 March 1961. That same day, the Secretary of State declared to the House of Commons that Her Majesty's Government had taken a decision. The Commissioner's constitutional recommendations to be the basis for the subsequent Malta constitution were to be granted. The 1961 Constitution was also known as the Blood Constitution. It was enclosed in the Malta Constitution Order in Council 1961 and it was completed on 24 October of that same year. The statement that the Order makes provision for a new constitution where Malta is given self-government is found on the final page of the Order in Council.

The 1961 Constitution provided the backbone for the Independence Constitution. A date was provided to guarantee this legal continuity. An indispensable characteristic of this constitution is the substitution of the diarchic system, which was no longer practicable, by system of only one Government, the Government of Malta, with full legislative and executive powers. At that time Malta was still a colony and responsibility for defence and external affairs were referred to Her Majesty's Government. There was a clear indication that the road towards independence continued and now was at a highly developed stage. It is imperative to recognise that the 1961 Constitution established most of the features of the 1964 Constitution. The British recognised Malta as a State. Another important characteristic of this constitution was an innovative introduction of a chapter covering the safeguarding of Fundamental Rights and Freedoms of the Individual. This is fairly significant because Fundamental Human Rights are a protection for the individual by the State. In the 1961 Constitution, Fundamental Human Rights and Freedoms are found in Chapter IV. The protection of freedom of movement was introduced only in the 1964 Constitution.

The declaration of rights of the inhabitants of the islands of Malta and Gozo dated 15 June 1802, gives a collective declaration of rights. The 1961 Constitution gave birth to what was recognised as a Parliament in the 1964 Independence Constitution. The Cabinet had the general direction and management of the Government of Malta. It consisted of the Prime Minister. The Prime Minister alone might summon it and it was this office which presided over it. Not more than seven other ministers were members of the Legislative Assembly, and they were collectively responsible to it. This was one of the first attempts to restate some of the more important British Constitutional Conventions in the constitution. In the exercise of his powers, the Governor was to act on the advice of the Cabinet, except where he was directed to act in his discretion or on the recommendation or advice of a person other than the Cabinet.

Three elections of the promulgation of the 1961 Constitution existed. This constitution included the presence of a Cabinet for the first time in Malta. The legislature was unicameral. The Legislative Assembly's normal life span was of four years. It consisted of fifty members and they were elected by universal suffrage from ten electoral divisions on the system of proportional representation by the single transferable vote. The 1961 Constitution constructed a firm foundation for a future achievement of Independence. When in 1964 Malta did in fact become independent, because the Government chose to avoid breaking all ties with the United Kingdom, there was legal continuity of the legislation, as a result of which Parliament remained functional. To a certain extent the same situation existed as regards to the legislation by the British Parliament for Malta. The Malta Independence Order itself developed into the subject of an entrenchment, since here it is declared that this evolved into an extension to the 1961 Constitution even in the sense of an amendment.

Even though Malta acquired independence, there was an ongoing presence of continuity. One of them is the monarchy pre-1964 and prior 1964. The Malta Independence Order 1964 was subject to the Malta Independence Act of that same year and it is a document that holds the chief regulations that govern the constitution of a state. This document is supreme over each and every other document and all legislation is subject to it. Throughout Malta's constitutional history, the nation acquired its own constitution, and to a certain extent, the Independence Constitution is made up of certain principles that arose for the first time in previous constitutions. It can be said that the Independence Constitution has evolved from the constitution which preceded it. But one must not ignore the fact that changes have taken place in this process of evolution. The statement that the 1964 constitution is in fact a replica of the 1961 constitution with sovereignty added might be criticised by saying that some factors differ between the two constitutions. The 1964 constitution is not merely what can be defined as an improvement. It is more like another stepping-stone in constitutional history being the final step in a long series of constitutions. In fact, even though it may seem that some provisions were altered from the 1961 constitution to the 1964 constitution, some of those provisions remained unchanged until the amendments of the 1964 constitution were made. On 14 April 2014, the anti-discrimination provision of constitution is amended to include sexual orientation and gender identity. In 2020, following a review by the Council of Europe's Venice Commission, the constitution was amended to reduce the powers of the Prime Minister.

=== Amendments ===
The Malta Independence Order, 1964, as amended by

Acts:
- XLI of 1965,
- XXXVII of 1966,
- IX of 1967,
- XXVI of 1970,
- XLVII of 1972,
- LVII and LVIII of 1974,
- XXXVIII of 1976,
- X of 1977,
- XXIX of 1979,
- IV of 1987,
- XXIII of 1989,
Proclamations Nos:
- II and VI of 1990,
Acts:
- XIX of 1991,
- IX of 1994,
Proclamations:
- IV of 1995
- III of 1996,
Acts:
- XI of 1996,
- XVI of 1997,
- III of 2000,
- XIII of 2001,
- V of 2003,
- XIV and XXI of 2007,
- 8 XX of 2011,
- VII and X of 2014

== Past constitutions ==
Malta has had numerous past constitutions.

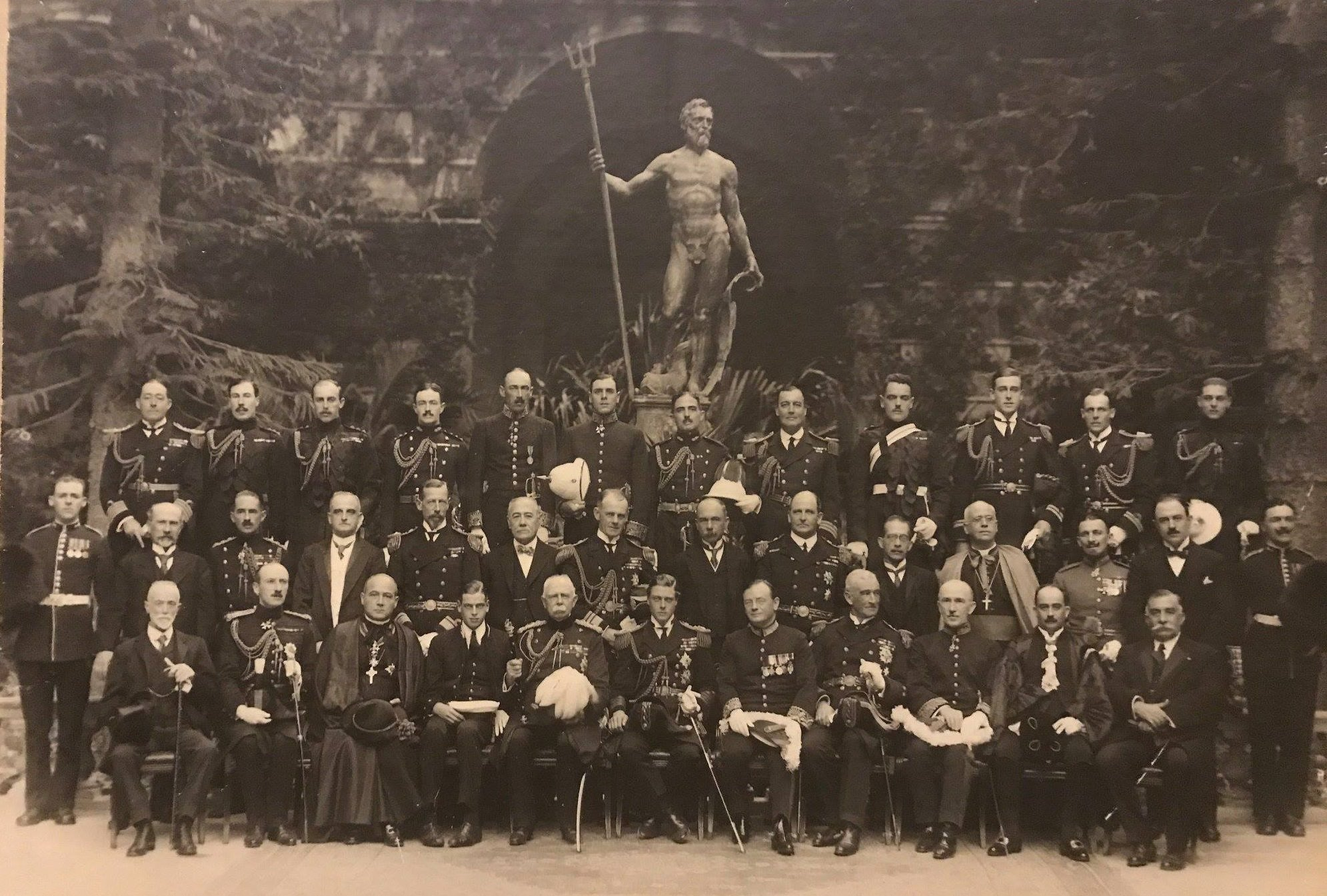
Prince of Wales with some Senators and other dignitaries. Inauguration of the new Constitution of Malta, 1 November 1921. Courtyard of Grandmaster's Palace.

- The 1813 Constitution
- The 1835 Constitution
- The 1849 Constitution
- The 1887 Constitution
- The 1903 Constitution
- The 1921 Constitution
- The 1936 Constitution
- The 1939 Constitution
- The 1947 Constitution
- The 1959 Constitution
- The 1961 Constitution

== See also ==
- Politics of Malta
- President of Malta
- LGBT rights in Malta
