= Basilica of Our Lady of Mount Carmel, Valletta =

Basilica of Our Lady of Mount Carmel
- Santwarju Bażilika tal-Madonna tal-Karmnu
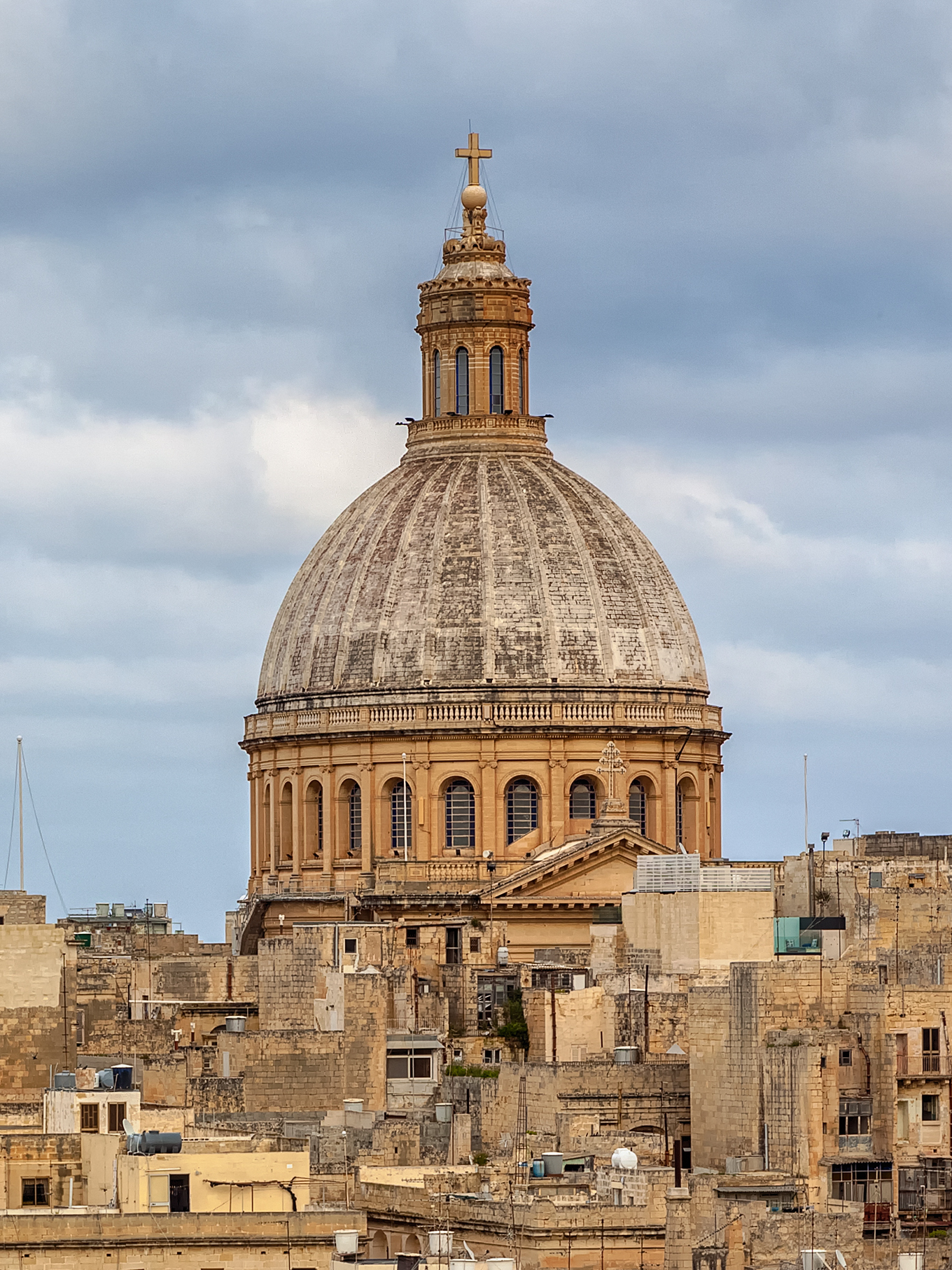
- The basilica's dome in 2015
- Basilica of Our Lady of Mount Carmel
- 35°54′0.7″N 14°30′44.2″E
- Location: Valletta, Malta
- Denomination: Roman Catholic
- Religious order: Carmelites

History
- Status: Minor basilica
- Founded: 1570
- Dedication: Our Lady of Mount Carmel
- Consecrated: 6 April 1886

Architecture
- Functional status: Active
- Architect(s): Girolamo Cassar (first church); Giuseppe Bonavia (façade); Ġużè Damato (present church)
- Style: Neoclassical
- Years built: c. 1570–1591/1608 (first church); 1852 (façade); 1958–1981 (present church)

Specifications
- Materials: Limestone

Administration
- Archdiocese: Malta
- Parish: Valletta (St Dominic)

Clergy
- Rector: Alex Scerri

The Basilica of Our Lady of Mount Carmel (Maltese: Santwarju Bażilika tal-Madonna tal-Karmnu) is a Carmelite Roman Catholic minor basilica dedicated to Our Lady of Mount Carmel, located in Valletta, Malta. It is one of the major churches of Valletta, and forms part of a UNESCO World Heritage Site which includes the entire city. The present church was constructed between 1958 and 1981 on the site of a late 16th century church which was destroyed during World War II.

Pope Leo XIII granted a Pontifical decree of canonical coronation towards its venerated Marian image of Our Lady of Carmel on 19 June 1880 through the Vatican Chapter. The coronation took place on 15 July 1881.

== History ==
=== First church ===
The Carmelite Order had a presence on Malta from at least 1418, and it established a church and convent within Valletta shortly after the city's founding in 1566. Hospitaller Grand Master Pierre de Monte transferred a plot of land to the Carmelites on 27 July 1570; the deed of transfer was retained within the records of notary Placido Habel. The property was transferred for 66 scudi, but in April 1571 del Monte issued two decrees which rescinded this sum, such that the Carmelites were granted the land for free.

Carmelite vicar Ġwann Vella commissioned architect Girolamo Cassar to design the church and priory. While these were being constructed, mass was celebrated in a small temporary chapel dedicated to the Annunciation. Inquisitor Pietro Dusina visited it in February 1575 and made a record of its contents. The chapel served as the first parish church of Valletta, until it was later absorbed into the parish of St Paul's Shipwreck. Cassar's church was completed in 1591 or 1608.

Between the 16th and 18th centuries, numerous Hospitaller knights donated money, property or artworks to the Carmelite friars, and one such knight, Girolamo de Fosses, paid for the construction of a chapel dedicated to Our Lady of Pilar within the church. The building was especially patronised by knights from the German langue who were based in the nearby Auberge d'Allemagne and did not have their own dedicated church.

In 1852, a new façade was constructed to designs of architect Giuseppe Bonavia, and some internal alterations were also made at this point. The church's altarpiece was crowned by Bishop Carmelo Scicluna on 15 July 1881, and on 6 April 1886, the church was consecrated by Apostolic Administrator Antonio Maria Buhagiar. Pope Leo XIII gave it the status of minor basilica on 13 May 1895.

On 4 March 1942, during World War II, the church was bombarded and it suffered serious damage. The Carmelite friars subsequently decided to demolish its ruins and replace it with a new church. Several artistic and historic objects were lost in the process, although many of the old church's contents survived and were reincorporated into the new building.

=== Present church ===
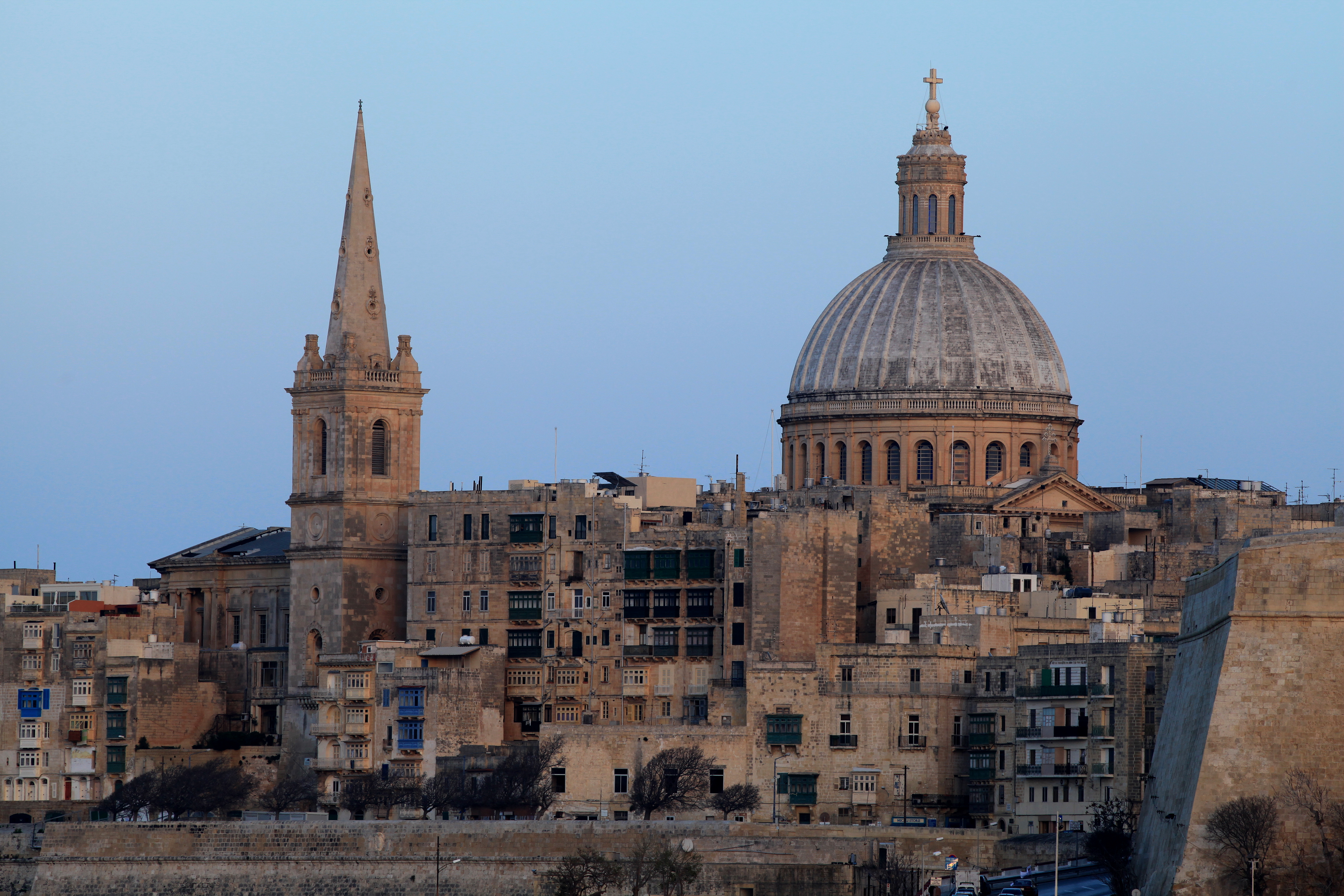
The Basilica's dome (right) and the bell tower of St Paul's Pro-Cathedral (left) in the cityscape of Valletta

The present church was built to designs of the architect Ġużè Damato. Construction commenced on 30 April 1958, when the foundation stone was blessed by the Prior General. The building was completed on 15 June 1981, subsequently being blessed by Prior Provincial Manwel Gatt. The church's dome is slightly higher than the bell tower of the nearby Anglican St Paul's Pro-Cathedral, and it was reportedly deliberately designed in order to compete with it.

The church's interior was sculpted by Joseph Damato over a period of 19 years.

The church falls under the jurisdiction of the parish of St Dominic, and the building is listed on the National Inventory of the Cultural Property of the Maltese Islands.

== Architecture ==
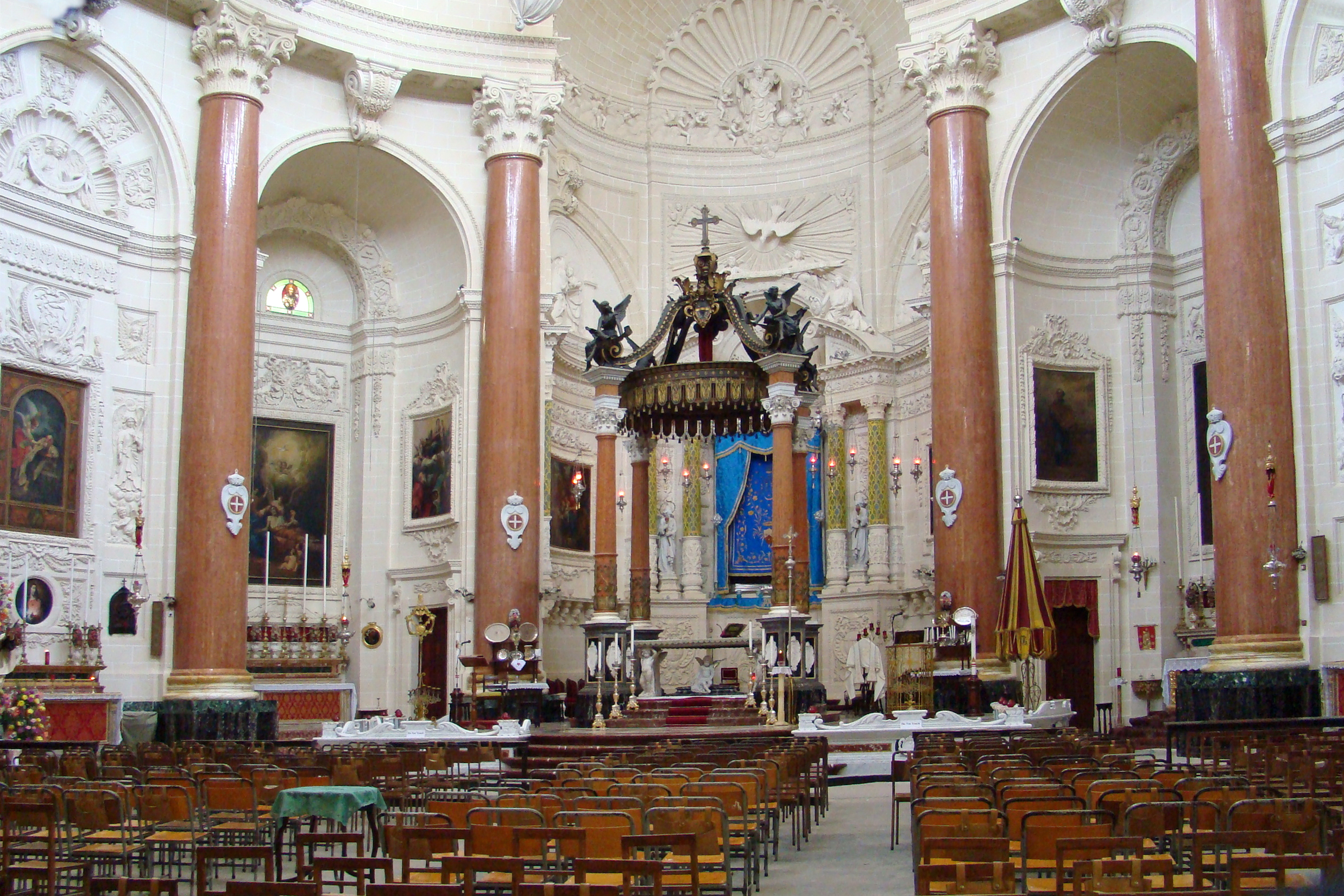
Interior of the Basilica

The 16th century church had a length of 150 ft (46 m) and a width of 50 ft (15 m), and it consisted of a wide nave and lateral chapels with a total of ten altars. It had a low dome and a bell tower, and the interior was decorated by painted frescoes.

The 20th century church has been described as an example of neoclassical architecture. It has a large, 42 m (138 ft) high oval dome which occupies a prominent position in the Valletta skyline facing Marsamxett. Internally, the church has columns of red marble.

A niche with a statue of Our Lady of Mount Carmel is located on the church's exterior, at the corner of Old Theatre and Old Mint Streets. The statue was sculpted by Salvatore Dimech in 1855.

== Artworks ==
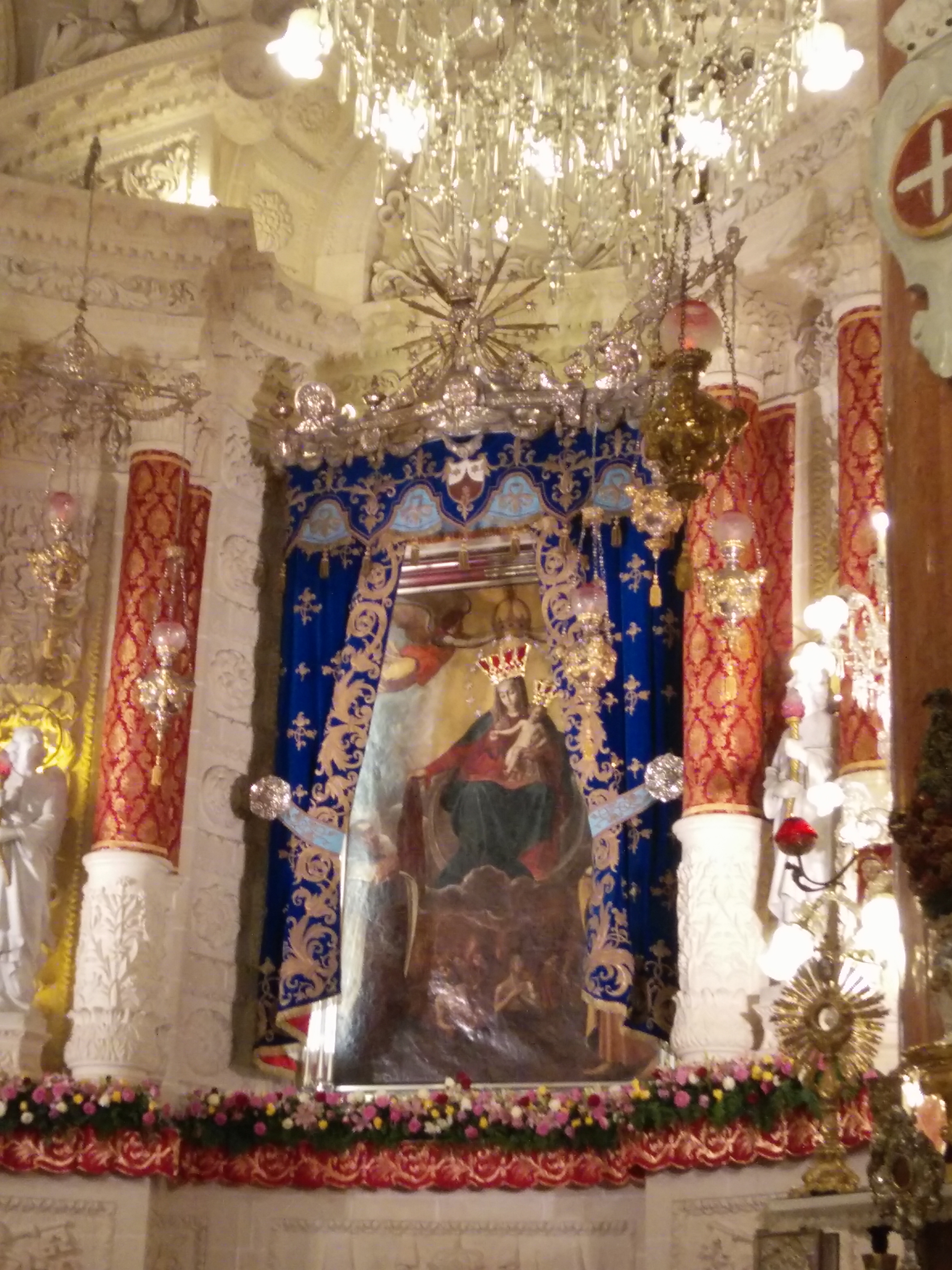
The church's altarpiece

The church's altarpiece is a painting of the Virgin Mary holding a baby Jesus, flanked by saints Simon Stock and Agatha of Sicily. (Note: 18th and 19th century sources state that the painting also depicted Saint Lucy; the latter's figure is no longer apparent and it is believed to have been obscured during an 1856 restoration.) The painting's artist and origins are unknown, but it is believed to date back to at least the late 16th or early 17th centuries and some attribute it to Filippo Paladini. Some sources state that the work was acquired by the Carmelites from Sicily at the time of the first church's construction. The painting was restored by Paul Cuschieri in 1856, by Samwel Bugeja in 1978, and by Godwin Cutajar in the 21st century.

A wooden statue of Our Lady of Mount Carmel which was sculpted in Naples in 1781 is located within a niche in the church. It stands on a silver pedestal designed by Abram Gatt, and it was restored by Publius Magro in the 21st century.

The church also includes the 1670s work Beato Franco by Maria de Dominici.

== Burials ==
Numerous people were buried inside the church, including several Hospitaller knights, Caterina Scappi and Caterina Vitale. Scappi and Vitale's Baroque marble tombstones survived World War II and were affixed onto the walls of the new church.
