= Caterina Scappi =

Italian born Maltese benefactress

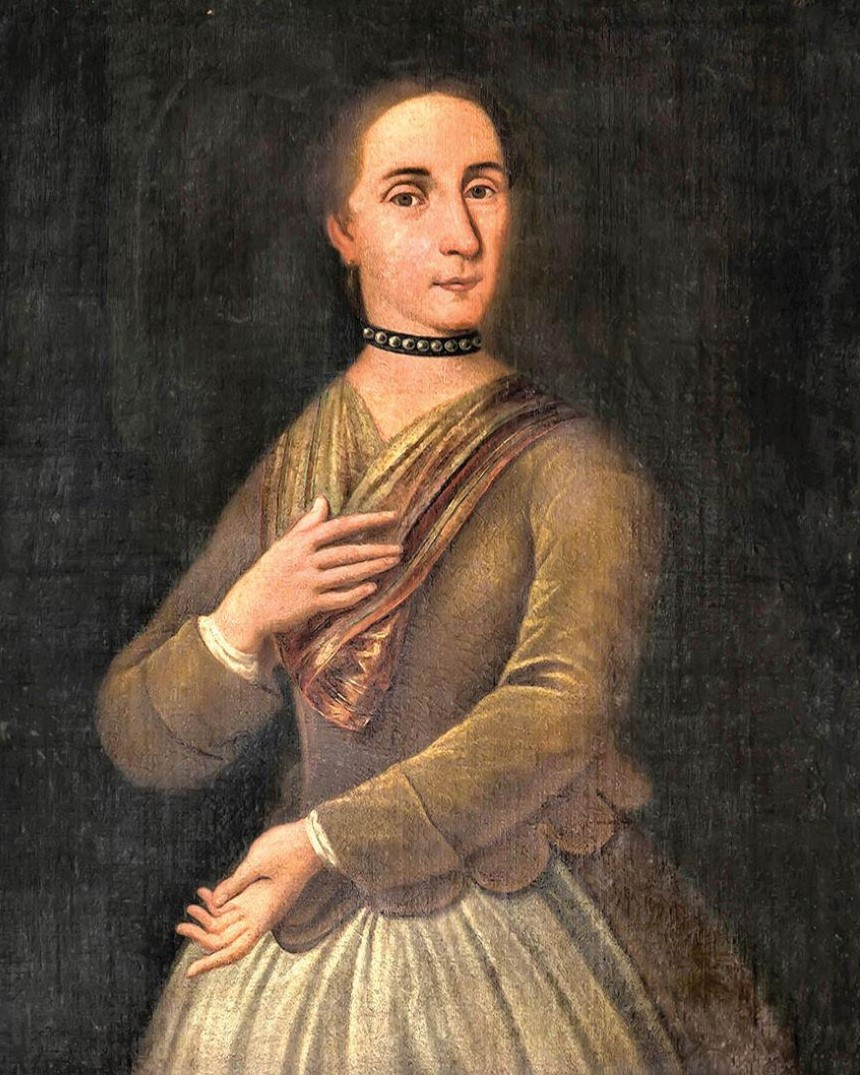
- Died: 20 June 1643; Valletta, Malta
- Resting place: Basilica of Our Lady of Mount Carmel, Valletta
- Other name: La Senese
- Occupations: Businesswoman, benefactor
- Known for: Founding the first hospital exclusively for women in Malta

Caterina Scappi (died 20 June 1643) was a rich and well-respected benefactor of the Carmelite church in Malta. Little is known about her origins or early life, but she is known for her substantial charitable donations for women's causes. In particular, she founded the first hospital in Malta dedicated exclusively to women.

== Early life ==
Originally from Siena, Italy, from where she got her nickname "La Senese", Scappi spent a lot of her life in Malta. Scappi was an active businesswoman, from which she may have acquired some of her fortune. Her birth place, year of birth, and filiation are unknown, and she never mentioned them in any of the notarial contracts or wills she wrote. The first mention of Caterina Scappi in Malta comes from a criminal court record from 1583-4, in which Scappi testifies in a robbery case.

== Charitable donations and the founding of the hospital ==
Scappi was considerably wealthy, but did not live a life of luxury, rather donating a lot of her money to charitable causes. She is known to have donated money to the convent of the Repentite in 1597; this was a religious institute whose mission was to help prostitutes. At the time, she specified that should she later choose to join the convent, this payment should be considered a down-payment.

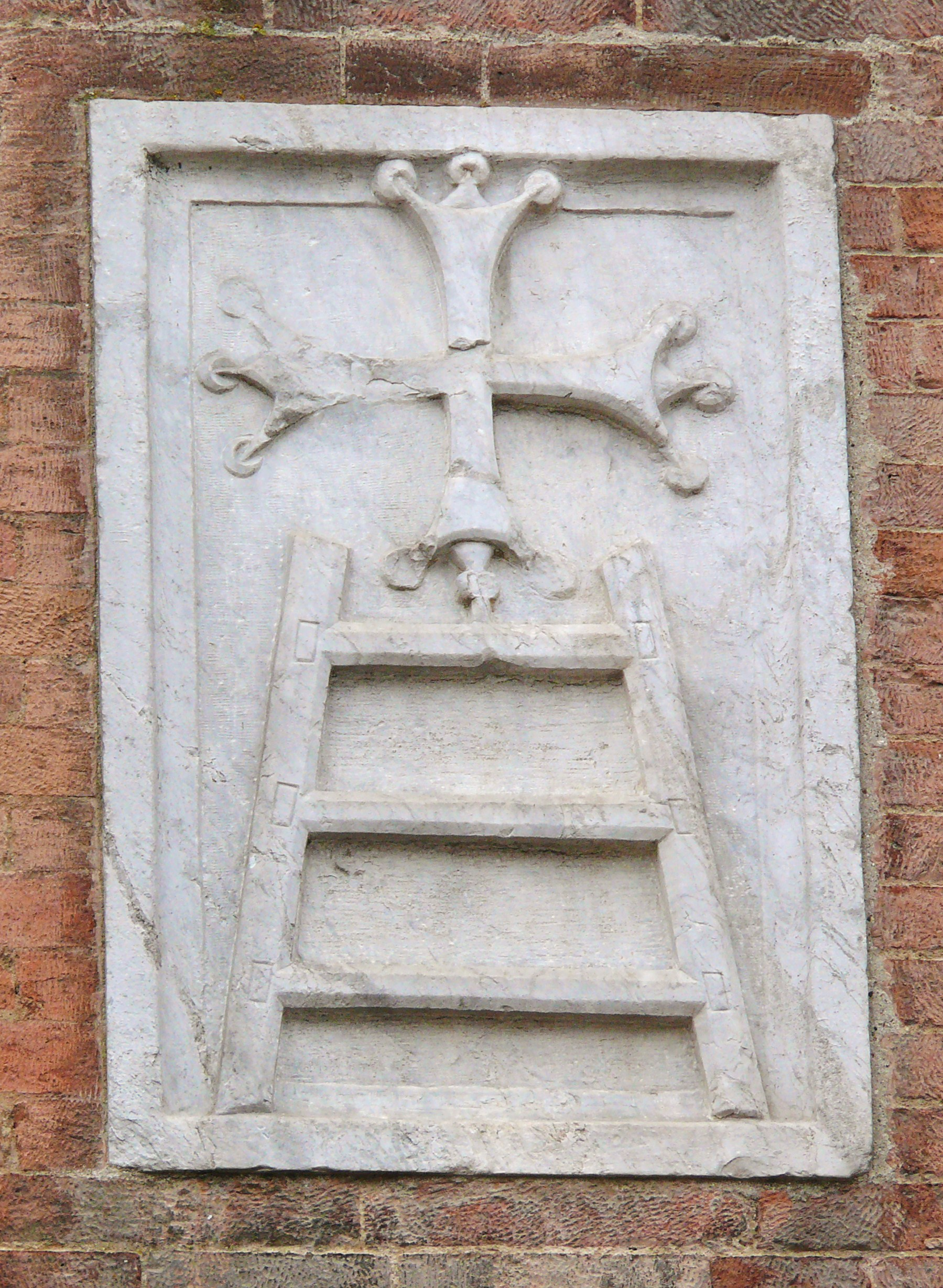
Coat of arms of Santa Maria della Scala

Though hospitals existed for the knights, women in need of care had nowhere to go. Scappi is thought to have treated women in her private home, but in 1625, using her resources, she endowed the ospedaletto, also known as La Casetta, the first hospital dedicated exclusively to women. In her will, she describes her motivations for founding the hospital: "As inspired by the Lord, eager to help and cure those wretched women who have fallen ill and who, bereft of everything, cannot receive treatment in their homes, driven by mercy for their misery." For this, and her many contributions to helping women, Giovanni Bonello who researched her life in a series of articles for the Times of Malta, calls her "the very first feminist in the history of a male-dominant Malta."

The hospital started in a house called Santa Maria della Scala, after a renowned hospital in Sienna. This hospital's coat of arms was engraved on Scappi's tombstone. Later, the hospital relocated, and was officially named Santa Maria della Pietà. The hospital was subsidised by the Order of St John in 1631.

In his book History of Gynaecology in Malta, Charles Savona-Ventura explains that "The advent of the Knights of St John in 1530 and the establishment of the Island as a maritime base brought prostitution to the Islands creating an ideal environment for the spread of venereal disease." In fact, Malta's high venereal disease infection rate had earned the island a grim reputation. In 1979, an anonymous author wrote: "There is no place in the whole world where venereal disease attacks faster and spreads easier than in Malta, for here it is a compound of all the poxes in the world." Scappi's hospital came to be known as the "spedale delle donne incurabili", the hospital for incurable women. This is because many of the women who came to be treated were prostitutes with venereal diseases, which were incurable at the time. They were usually treated with mercury, and some patients died of mercury poisoning.

== Legacy ==
In the last will she drafted, in 1643, Scappi chose two knights from Sienna, Fra Ottavio Bardinelli and Fra Giulio Cesare, as her testamentary executors, and protectors of the ospedaletto. Upon their death, she asked that they be replaced by two more knights from Siena. She also specified that should something happen to the Santa Maria della Pietà house, her fortune should be used to buy another house to serve as a women's hospital.

After Scappi's death, the Ordinary Council of the Order of St John closed down the hospital, but without it, there was no way of preventing the spread of venereal disease or treating it, so the hospital was reopened in 1659. The hospital was renovated to increase the number of beds, reaching 230 beds by 1786. It began accepting mentally ill patients, as well as maternity cases, and eventually children. The hospital was later destroyed during a war.

Scappi's will contains further donations: she established free refuges for women, and donated furniture, money, clothes, and dowries. Scappi owned a slave, Giuliana, whom she freed upon her death. Scappi left further legacies to many women, including Caterina Doneo, the daughter of the painter Francesco Doneo, and Lucrezia Montano, the daughter of the lawyer Palermino Montano.

There is no record of Scappi being married, nor that she had any biological children. However, in 1632 she adopted a six year-old girl named Maria, whom she looked after for 14 years.

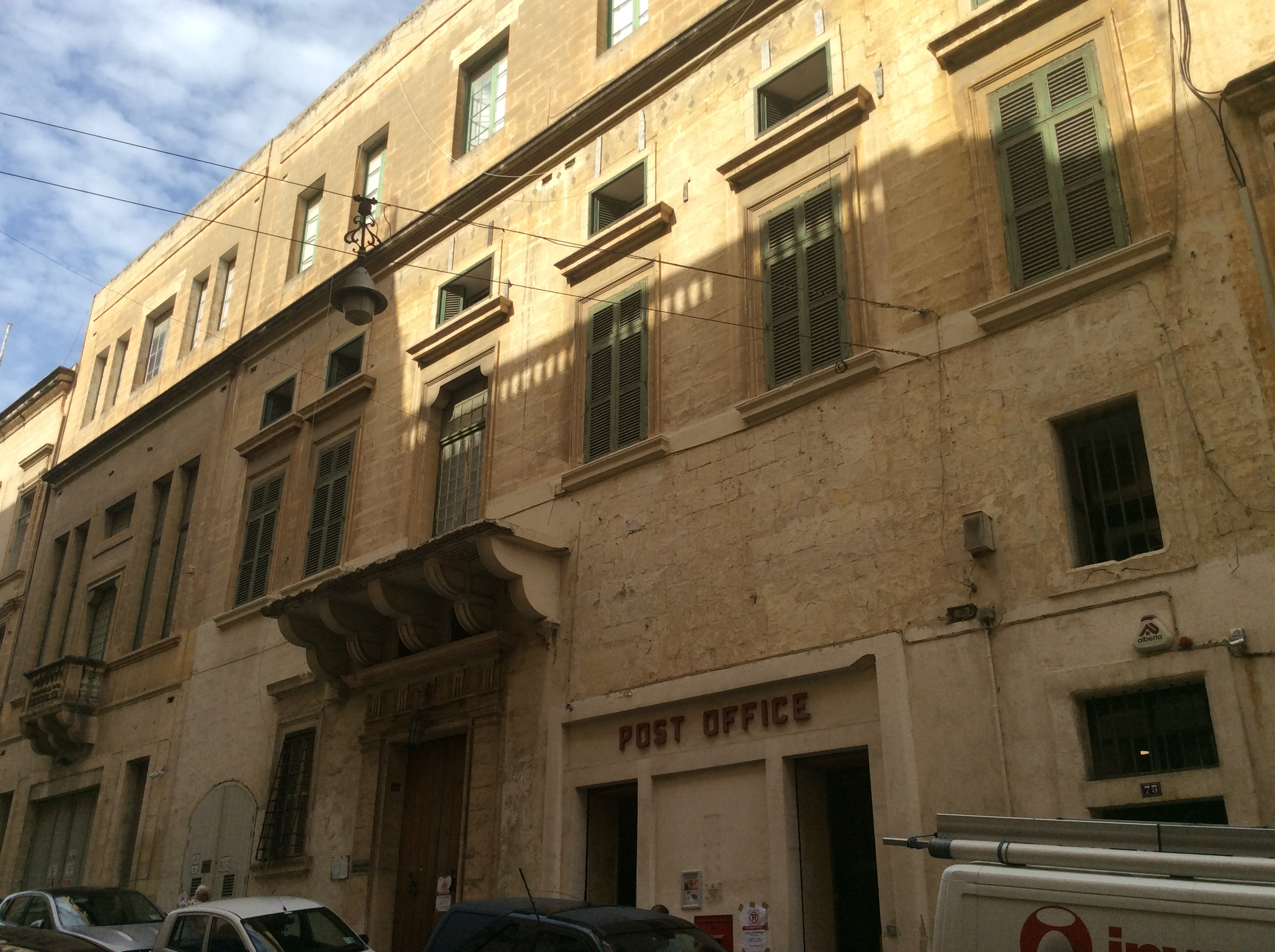
Casa Scappi, in Valletta

She was buried in the church of Our Lady of Mount Carmel in Valletta. She was initially buried in a corner of a chapel, but in 1791 her body was exhumed in order to be reburied in a more prominent area of the church. There is speculation that this reburial was evidence of a power play for the Scappi foundation.

When the church was pulled down in 1958, both her tombstone and that of Caterina Vitale were kept and put on display in the new church. Casa Scappi, the house where she likely lived, at 74 Old Bakery Street in Valletta, housed the Johann Strauss School of Music.

In the book Awguri Giovanni Bonello!, Clare Azzopardi wrote a fictional piece about Caterina Scappi, from the perspectives of women who knew her.
