= National Book Council =

Public entity dedicated to the promotion of the book industry in Malta

- Abbreviation: NBC
- Established: 2001 (25 years ago)
- Types: cultural institution, ISBN registration agency, public enterprise
- Headquarters: Floriana
- Country: Malta
- Chairpersons: Mark Camilleri
- Website: ktieb.org.mt

The National Book Council (Maltese: Il-Kunsill Nazzjonali tal-Ktieb), is a Maltese public entity dedicated to the promotion of the book industry in Malta.

It organises the Malta Book Festival (Maltese: Il-Festival Nazzjonali Tal-Ktieb), The Literary Contest of Novels for Youth (Maltese: Konkors ta' Kitba Letteratura għaż-Żgħażagħ) and other national and regional events, workshops, seminars and contests. It also confers the National Book Prize (Maltese: Premju Nazzjonali Tal-Ktieb), administers Public Lending Rights, and is Malta's registration agent for ISBN and ISMN.

== National Book Prize ==
In 1971, the Literary Prize for books in Maltese was set up with the aim to encourage Maltese literature. Notable authors who were awarded this Prize include Anton Buttigieg, Francis Ebejer, Oliver Friggieri, Joe Friggieri, and Trevor Zahra. The organization of the Prize was passed to the National Book Council upon its formation in 2001. There are nowadays several categories within the Prize, including novels, short stories, poetry, translation, nonfiction, and research. Notable winners since 2001 include Trevor Zahra, Guido Lanfranco, Giovanni Bonello, Joe Friggieri, and Albert Ganado.
