= Giovanni Bonello =

Maltese magistrate and judge

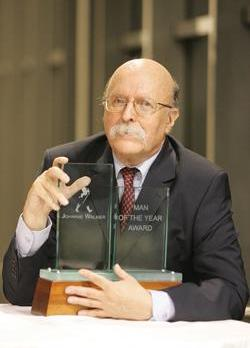

Judge of the European Court of Human Rights in respect of Malta
- In office 1998–2010
- Preceded by: Giuseppe Mifsud Bonnici
- Succeeded by: Vincent De Gaetano

Personal details
- Born: 11 June 1936 (age 90) Floriana, Malta
- Parents: Vincenzo Bonello (father); Victoria née Magri (mother)
- Education: University of Malta

Giovanni Bonello (born 11 June 1936 in Floriana) is a Maltese judge, judge of the European Court of Human Rights from 1998 until 2004, then extended till 2010.

== Early Years ==
Bonello was born in Floriana, Malta to Vincenzo Bonello and Victoria (née Magri), the sister of judges Alberto Magri and Edoardo Magri.

His father was the curator of the national art collection in the interwar period and among the Maltese patriots, including Enrico Mizzi, who were deported and interned in Uganda by the British colonial administration during the Second World War. Following his father's internment, Giovanni Bonello went to live with his uncle, Alberto Magri, who played an important role in his upbringing.

== Legal Career ==
Bonello studied law at the Royal University of Malta (later the University of Malta) and practiced for the first decades of his professional career, specializing in constitutional and human rights litigation in newly-independent Malta. He defended over 170 human rights lawsuits before Maltese and international courts. At a point, was also the legal adviser of Malta's Chamber of Commerce. Bonello was, among others, the legal counsel of the Little Company of Mary in the saga that opposed the Irish nuns to Dom Mintoff's government, which finally closed down their Blue Sisters Hospital.

=== Judge at the European Court of Human Rights ===
In 1990, the new Nationalist government led by Eddie Fenech Adami nominated Bonello as Chief Justice of Malta and (ex officio) President of the Constitutional Court, as well as Judge from Malta at the European Court of Human Rights. Yet, Bonello declined the appointment, as Fenech Adami insisted Bonello should take both the positions in Malta, and in Strasbourg. Fenech Adami then appointed Giuseppe Mifsud Bonnici to both posts.

It was then the new Labour government led by Alfred Sant, in 1998, to appoint Bonello as Maltese judge at the European Court of Human Rights, from 1 November 1998 until 31 October 2004. As the Parliamentary Assembly of the Council of Europe rejected the all-male list of candidates proposed by the Maltese Government to succeed him, Bonello's term was extended twice until 19 September 2010. Bonello was finally replaced by Vincent A. De Gaetano in 2010.

Bonello has been considered a liberal judge. He has been the first judge whose separate opinions were published during his tenure, later also the separate opinions of the Portuguese judge Paulo Pinto de Albuquerque were also published in Italy. Judge (later Court President) Nicolas Bratza and leading authority on Human Rights Law Michael O'Boyle published them with Wolf Legal Publishers of the Netherlands. His separate opinions were also collected in the book When Judges Dissent, published in 2008.

Upon his retirement from the European Court of Human Rights, Court president Jean-Paul Costa said "Vanni" brought "robust independence of spirit and unflagging commitment to the protection of human rights". He displayed such qualities time and again in numerous separate opinions given in his unique and memorable style, which was "elegant as it is forceful", using "vocabulary as rich as it is rare". In fact, his opinions led Judge Bonello to attain "near-legendary" status among all those who followed Strasbourg case law, he said. President Costa said Judge Bonello was a true gentlemen who gained the respect and affection of all those who worked with him, whether they agreed with him or not. He was a marvellous ambassador for his profession and his country. "Along with his professional achievements, Vanni is a man of broad and deep culture, a connoisseur of great art and a distinguished historian. Now that he can finally take his leave of the Court, he can and will dedicate himself more fully to these intellectual and aesthetic pursuits." The president recounted an anecdote about the man he befriended during his long term at the Court. He said he had tried making a modest personal contribution to Judge Bonello's historical studies about the French occupation of Malta during the Napoleonic era, however, he soon realised his assistance was almost useless because Judge Bonello knew virtually everything there was to know on the subject.

== Publications ==
Bonello has published several history books, some of which led Bonello to be awarded the National Book Prize by the National Book Council. He also served as president for the Malta Historical Society from 2011 to 2015.

Bonello also wrote a series of articles for the Times of Malta, celebrating the life of Caterina Scappi, founder of the first hospital exclusively for women in Malta: "For her absolutely pioneer social commitment, for this revolutionary philanthropy, Scappi deserves the monument she never got. Only an obscure and overlooked tombstone in the Carmelite church in Valletta today bears witness to her existence, her feminist vision and her generous, farsighted altruism."

In 2018 Bonello published Misunderstanding the Constitution, a collection of essays first published on the Times of Malta and dedicated to "How the Maltese judiciary undermines human rights". Robert Thake described it as an "indictment of the Maltese judicial system and the often-frightening condition of Malta’s human rights record". Bonello discusses the abysmal record of Maltese cases at the European Court of Human Rights (85% of Malta's Constitutional Court decisions are overturned in Strasbourg) and how Maltese judges have misunderstood key human rights notions, including by pretending that the Constitutional Court is a "Court of last instance" (rejecting as ill-founded all application that would not have "exhausted domestic remedies") and by refusing to accept the erga omnes validity of its own rulings.

Bonello was also the author of "Page 13", the most widely read (and anonymous) political news column of The Sunday Times of Malta in the 1970s and 1980s, dedicated to human rights issues during the Labour government of Dom Mintoff - "But I have never actually confirmed or denied the rumour myself", as he stated in 2008.

== Awards ==
Among others:

- 2003: Gold Medal of the Malta Society of Arts, Manufactures and Commerce
- Companion of the National Order of Merit
- Cavaliere of the Italian Republic
- Knight of the Sovereign Military Order of Malta
- Insignia of Merit by the Russian Federation for outstanding achievement
- Extraordinary gold medal by the Judiciary of the Republic of Moldova
