= National Book Prize (Malta) =

Maltese literary award in conferred by the National Book Council

The National Book Prize is an award presented to authors, editors, translators, publishers, and illustrators judged to have "bestowed literacy for their contributions to literature in Malta" within the past year. Shortlists and awards are separated into the categories of the National Book Prize for adults and the Terramaxka Prize for children and young adults. The board oversees "upholding the values of transparency and fairness at the highest level".
