= Trevor Żahra =

Maltese novelist, poet and illustrator (born 1947)

Trevor Żahra M.Q.R.
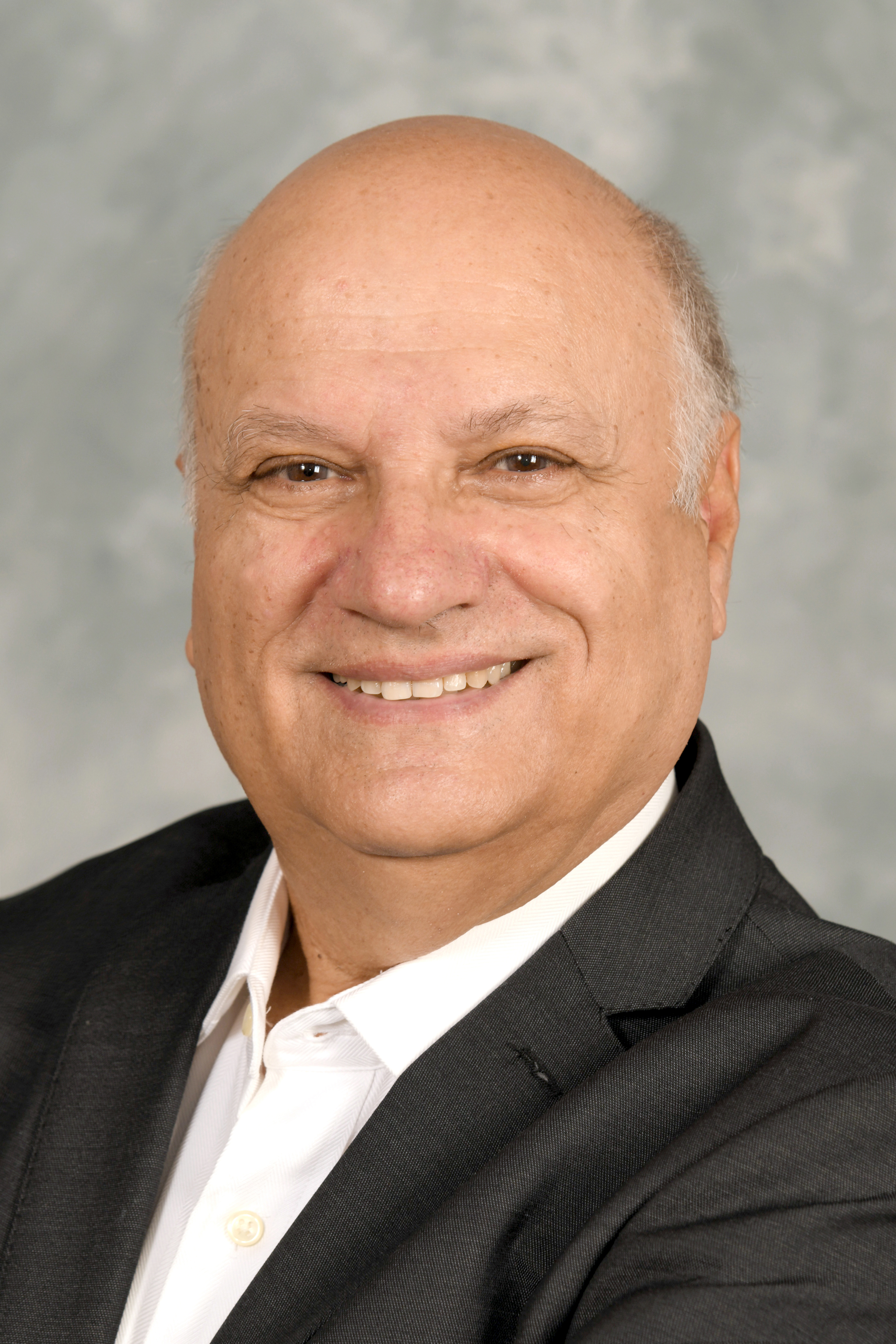
- Born: 16 December 1947 (age 78); Żejtun, Crown Colony of Malta
- Occupations: Novelist, schoolteacher
- Spouse: Stella Agius (m. 1971; died 1989)
- Children: 2
- Writing career
- Language: Maltese
- Years active: 1971–present
- Website: www.trevorzahra.com

Trevor Żahra (born 16 December 1947) is a Maltese novelist, poet and illustrator. He has published over 120 books in the Maltese language since 1971.

== Biography ==
Trevor Żahra was born on 16 December 1947 in Żejtun. He worked as a school teacher for over three decades, teaching art and the Maltese language in government schools. He was married to Stella née Agius from 1971 until her death in 1989, and together they had two children called Ruben and Marija.

In 1971 Żahra published his first novel, a children's adventure book entitled Il-Pulena tad-Deheb (Maltese for "The Golden Figurehead"). Since then he has published over 120 books written in Maltese. He has written both children's and adult novels, as well as short stories, poetry, workbooks and translations. He is the best-selling Maltese author in history.

Żahra illustrates his children's books with his own drawings. He also designed a set of two EUROPA postage stamps for MaltaPost in 2001.

Żahra has won multiple literary awards throughout his career, including Malta's national literary prize for a record 15 times. Books which have won prizes include Taħt il-Weraq tal-Palm, Is-Seba' Tronġiet Mewwija, Ħolm tal-Milied, Lubien, Taħt Sema Kwiekeb, Provenz and X'Tixtiequ Jagħmel il-Fenek? He was also awarded the Midalja għall-Qadi tar-Repubblika on 13 December 2004. In 2020, Żahra was awarded the Lifetime Achievement Award for Literature during the National Book Prize.
