= Order of precedence in Malta =

Relative preeminence of officials for ceremonial purposes

The Maltese order of precedence is a conventionally set list. It is only used as a guide for protocol.

== Order of precedence as from 2016 ==
1. President of Malta (Myriam Spiteri Debono)
2. Prime Minister (Robert Abela)
3. Speaker of the House (Angelo Farrugia)
4. Metropolitan Archbishop of Malta (Charles J. Scicluna)
5. Chief Justice (Mark Chetcuti)
6. Government Ministers (Note: In order determined by the Government Gazette)
7. Parliamentary Secretaries
8. Leader of the Opposition (Bernard Grech)
9. Former Presidents (Note: Widows of same take courtesy position here. Companions of Honour of the National Order of Merit take courtesy position here.)
  1. Ugo Mifsud Bonnici (4 April 1994 - 4 April 1999)
  2. Eddie Fenech Adami (4 April 2004 - 4 April 2009)
  3. George Abela (4 April 2009 - 4 April 2014)
  4. Marie-Louise Coleiro Preca (4 April 2014 - 4 April 2019)
10. Former Prime Ministers
  1. Alfred Sant (28 October 1996 - 6 September 1998)
  2. Lawrence Gonzi (23 March 2004 - 11 March 2013)
  3. Joseph Muscat (11 March 2013 - 12 January 2020)
11. Diplomatic Corps
12. Bishop of Gozo (Anton Teuma)
13. Principal Permanent Secretary
14. Judges
15. Attorney General
16. Deputy Speaker of the House of Representatives
17. Members of Parliament
18. Former Metropolitan Archbishops of Malta, Chief Justices and Speakers of the House of Representatives
19. Magistrates of the Lower Court
20. Permanent secretaries, Commissioner of the Malta Police Force (Cmsr. Angelo Gafa'), Commander of the Armed Forces of Malta (Brigadier Clinton J. O'Neill)
21. Auditor General and Ombudsman
22. Heads of Bodies appointed in terms of the Constitution:
  1. Chief Electoral Commissioner
  2. Chairperson Public Service Commission
  3. Chairperson Broadcasting Authority
  4. Chairperson Employment Commission
  1. Chancellor of the University of Malta
  2. Governor of Central Bank of Malta
  1. Rector of the University of Malta
  2. President of the Executive Committee of the Local Councils Association
23. A) Positions in Grade 3 appointed in terms of the provisions of the Constitution:
  1. Directors General
  2. Maltese Heads of Mission/Representatives accredited abroad
  3. Deputy Attorney General
  4. Deputy Auditor General
  5. Deputy Commissioner of Police
  6. Directors (Clinical)

B) Equivalent positions in the Armed Forces

  1. Deputy Commander of the Armed Forces of Malta
  2. Colonels of the Armed Forces of Malta

C) Registrar of the National Orders of Merit

1. A. Positions in Grade 4 appointed in terms of the provisions of the Constitution:
  1. Director (Grade 4)
  2. Assistant Attorneys General
  3. Assistant Commissioners of Police

B) Equivalent positions in the Armed Forces

  1. Lieutenant Colonels of the Armed Forces of Malta
1. Mayors
  1. Presidents of Regional Committees
  2. Honorary Consular Corps

A) Honorary Consuls-General B) Honorary Consuls

1. Cathedral Chapters:

A) Malta

  1. Archdeacon
  2. Dean
  3. Praecentor
  4. Treasurer
  5. Archpriest
  6. Chancellor

B) Gozo

  1. Archdeacon
  2. Dean
  3. Praecentor
  4. Archpriest
  5. Treasurer
1. Chairpersons of Public Authorities with Corporate Structure
2. Chairpersons National Government Institutions
3. Chairpersons Public Corporations
4. Chairpersons Statutory Commissions

A) Chairpersons Parastatal Companies (Government Direct Investments with Controlling Interests and having a National Service Character) B) Chairpersons Parastatal Companies (Investment through MIMCOL with Controlling Interests and having a National Service Character)

1. Chairpersons of Public Authorities not having a Corporate Structure
2. Honorary Consular Corps Honorary Vice-Consuls
3. Political Parties represented in Parliament

A) Partit Laburista B) Partit Nazzjonalista

1. Registered Trade Unions and Multisectoral Employers Association

A) Trade Unions: B) Multisectoral Employers Association:

1. National Business Organisations and Professional Bodies

A) National Business Organisations: B) Professional Bodies: Professions practised under Warrant Other Professions

1. Constituted Bodies

A) Religious Organisations B) National Councils/Commissions

== Order of precedence to 2019 ==
1. President of Malta (George Vella)
2. Foreign heads of state/Reigning monarchs
3. Prime Minister (Robert Abela)
4. Deputy Prime Minister (Chris Fearne)
5. Chief Justice (Joseph Camilleri)
6. Speaker of the House (Angelo Farrugia)
7. Ministers of the Government
8. Justices of the Superior Court
9. Parliamentary Secretaries
10. Members of Parliament
11. Magistrates of the Lower Court
12. Attorney General
13. Commander of the Armed Forces of Malta (Brigadier Mark Xuereb)
14. Mayors, in their jurisdiction
15. Local Councillors, in their jurisdiction
16. Ambassadors, in order of establishment of diplomatic relations with their respective countries
