= List of speakers of the House of Representatives of Malta =

Twenty nine people have served as speaker of the House of Representatives of Malta since the office was established in 1921. The post did not exist in the period between 1933 and 1947 and also in the period between 1958 and 1962.

Political parties

Political Union Nationalist Party Constitutional Party Labour Party

Speaker			Term of office			Political party
No.	Portrait	Name (Birth–Death)	No.	Took office	Left office	Political party
1		Edgar Arrigo (1870–1937)		October 1921	July 1923	Political Union
2		Salvatore Borg Olivier (1880–1937)		July 1923	June 1927	Nationalist Party
3		Robert Hamilton (1894–1945)		June 1927	July 1929	Constitutional Party
4		Anthony Montanaro Gauci (1898–1997)		August 1929	April 1930	Constitutional Party
5		Giuseppe Degiorgio (1892–1948)		October 1932	November 1933	Nationalist Party
Office abolished (November 1933 – November 1947)
6		Ġużè Cassar (1918–2001)		November 1947	April 1948	Labour Party
7		Peter Paul Debono (1890–1958)		April 1948	June 1950	Labour Party
8		Tommaso Caruana Demajo (1910–1973)		October 1950	October 1952	Nationalist Party
9		Anthony Pullicino (–)		October 1952	January 1953	Nationalist Party
10		Joseph Cassar Galea (1920–1989)		January 1953	March 1953	Nationalist Party
11		Edwin Busuttil (1923–2009)		March 1953	October 1953	Constitutional Party
12		Joseph M. Camilleri (–)		December 1953	December 1954	Nationalist Party
13		Joseph Flores (1907–1974)		March 1955	December 1955	Labour Party
14		Nestu Laiviera (1908–1984)		December 1955	April 1958	Labour Party
Office abolished (April 1958 – February 1962)
15		Paolo Pace (1909–1980)		February 1962	February 1966	Nationalist Party
16		Alfred Bonnici (1934–)		April 1966	June 1971	Nationalist Party
17		Emmanuel Attard Bezzina (1921–1988)		June 1971	September 1976	Labour Party
18		Nestu Laiviera (1908–1984)		September 1976	January 1978	Labour Party
19		Kalcidon Agius (1917–2006)		January 1978	February 1982	Labour Party
20		Daniel Micallef (1928–2022)		February 1982	July 1986	Labour Party
21		Paul Xuereb (1923–1994)		July 1986	February 1987	Labour Party
22		Joseph M. Baldacchino (1922–2006)		February 1987	May 1987	Labour Party
23		Jimmy Farrugia (1922–2006)		July 1987	October 1988	Nationalist Party
24		Lawrence Gonzi (1953–)		October 1988	September 1996	Nationalist Party
25		Myriam Spiteri Debono (1952–)		October 1996	August 1998	Labour Party
26		Anton Tabone (1937–)		October 1998	10 May 2008	Nationalist Party
27		Louis Galea (1948–)		10 May 2008	29 April 2010	Nationalist Party
28		Michael Frendo (1955–)		29 April 2010	6 April 2013	Nationalist Party
29		Angelo Farrugia (1955–)		6 April 2013	20 June 2026	Labour Party
30		Carmelo Abela (1972–)		20 June 2026	Incumbent	Labour Party

== See also ==
- Speaker of the House of Representatives of Malta
- Prime Minister of Malta
- President of Malta
- Government of Malta
- Parliament of Malta
