= 2025 in Malta =

- Decades: 2000s; 2010s; 2020s
- See also: History of Malta; List of years in Malta

Events in the year 2025 in Malta.

== Incumbents ==
From	To	Position	Incumbent	Picture
4 April 2024	Current	President of Malta	Myriam Spiteri Debono	
2020	Current	Prime Minister of Malta	Robert Abela	

== Events ==
=== February ===
- 4–8 February – 2025 edition of Malta Eurovision Song Contest.

=== April ===
- April 1 – LOT Polish Airlines announces that they will open a line to Malta.
- April 6 – Thirty-five people are arrested for living in Malta illegally and are planned to be deported.
- April 29 – The European Court of Justice orders the shutdown of Malta's golden passport program for violations of EU law.

=== May ===
- May 2 – The Conscience, a ship being used by the Freedom Flotilla Coalition to transport humanitarian aid to the Gaza Strip, sustains fire damage off the Maltese coast following a drone attack blamed by the group on Israel.
- 17 May – Malta's Miriana Conte finishes in 17th place at Eurovision 2025 in Switzerland with the single "Serving Kant".

=== June ===
- June 5 – Two people are convicted by a jury of supplying the car bomb used in the assassination of journalist Daphne Caruana Galizia in 2017.

=== July ===
- July 30 – Malta announces that it would recognize the State of Palestine effective September.

=== September ===
- 22 September – Malta formally recognizes the State of Palestine.

=== October ===
- 18 October – A boat carrying migrants from Libya sinks off the coast of Malta, killing at least one person and leaving 20 passengers missing.

=== November ===
- 12 November – Mouhamadou Dosso, a 33-year-old Ivory Coast national with an Italian ID, is sentenced to 10 years' imprisonment in Malta for attempting to recruit individuals for jihadist attacks in Europe.

=== December ===
- 12 December – At least 60 migrants are rescued by authorities and brought ashore at Buġibba after a boat capsizes near the coast.

== Deaths ==
- 5 January – Michael Falzon, 79, architect and politician, MP (1976–1996).
- 15 February – Louis Theobald, 86, footballer (Hibernians, Birżebbuġa St. Peter's, national team).
- 18 March – Paul Cremona, 79, archbishop of Malta (2007–2014).
- 26 March – Charles Spiteri, 81, footballer (Valletta, Lija Athletic, national team).
- 6 April – Willie Vassallo, 75, footballer (Floriana, Green Gully, national team).
- 21 April – Francis Zammit Dimech, 70, politician, minister of foreign affairs (2012–2013) and MEP (2017–2019).
- 6 June – Frans Said, 92, broadcaster and writer.
- 22 June – Noel Arrigo, 75, jurist, chief justice (2002).
- 25 June - Michael Seychell, 85, trade unionist leader, local politician, and public administrator.
- 24 July – Anthony Spiteri Debono, 78, first gentleman (since 2024).
- 29 July – Carmel Muscat, 63, Olympic cyclist (1980).
- 31 August – Sharon Ellul-Bonici, 55, politician.
- 20 October – Louis Pace, 77, footballer (Valletta, national team) and restaurateur.
- 2 November – Albert Ganado, 101, lawyer, historian, and cartographer.
- 20 November – David Azzopardi, 72, footballer (Sliema Wanderers, national team).

== See also ==
- 2025 in the European Union
- 2025 in Europe
