= 2026 in Malta =

- Decades: 2000s; 2010s; 2020s
- See also: History of Malta; List of years in Malta

Events in the year 2026 in Malta.

== Incumbents ==
From	To	Position	Incumbent	Picture
4 April 2024	Current	President of Malta	Myriam Spiteri Debono	
2020	Current	Prime Minister of Malta	Robert Abela	

== Events ==
=== March ===
- 3 March – The Russian tanker Arctic Metagaz is attacked by a suspected Ukrainian naval drone off the coast of Malta. All 30 crew are rescued.

=== May ===
- 30 May – 2026 Maltese general election: The ruling Labour Party of prime minister Robert Abela wins a fourth term in government after winning 36 seats in the House of Representatives.

=== June ===
- 1 June –
  - Two people are injured in an explosion at a fireworks factory in Naxxar.
  - Robert Abela is inaugurated for a third term as prime minister.
- 7 June – A boat carrying migrants capsizes southeast of Malta, killing at least 10 passengers.

=== September ===
- 2 September – Businessman Yorgen Fenech is acquitted on charges of involvement in the 2017 murder of anti-corruption journalist Daphne Caruana Galizia.

=== October ===
- 24 October – The Junior Eurovision Song Contest 2026 is held at the MFCC in Ta' Qali.

== Deaths ==
- 2 January – Tony Carr, 98, session drummer and percussionist (CCS, Hot Chocolate).
- 5 February – Helen Micallef, 75, singer.
- 19 August – Ġorġ Mallia, 68, communications academic, author and cartoonist.

== See also ==
- 2026 in the European Union
- 2026 in Europe
