= 2015 in Malta =

- Decades: 1990s; 2000s; 2010s; 2020s
- See also: History of Malta; List of years in Malta

The following lists events from 2015 in Malta.

== Incumbents ==
From	To	Position	Incumbent	Picture
4 April 2014	4 April 2019	President of Malta	Marie Louise Coleiro Preca	
11 March 2013	13 January 2020	Prime Minister of Malta	Joseph Muscat	
6 April 2013	20 June 2026	Speaker of the House of Representatives	Angelo Farrugia	

== Events ==
=== February ===
- February 18: The Irish Naval Service donated the patrol boat LÉ Aoife to the Maritime Squadron of the Armed Forces of Malta.

=== April ===
- April 11: The Local Council Elections were held, with the Labour Party winning the majority of the local council seats with a 53% majority.
- April 11: The Spring Hunting Referendum was held, with voters voting narrowly in favour of retaining the spring hunt with a 50.44% majority.

=== May ===
- May 4: The Parliament of Malta moves from the Grandmaster's Palace in Valletta to the purpose-built Parliament House.
- May 21: Malta participated in the 2015 Eurovision Song Contest, but failed to qualify for the finals.

=== November ===
- November 11-12:The Valletta Summit on Migration is held in Valletta.
- November 27-29: The Commonwealth Heads of Government Meeting 2015 is held in Malta.

== See also ==
- Malta in the Eurovision Song Contest 2015
- 2014–15 Maltese Premier League
- 2014–15 Maltese FA Trophy
- Public holidays in Malta
