= 2013 in Malta =

- Decades: 1990s; 2000s; 2010s; 2020s
- See also: History of Malta; List of years in Malta

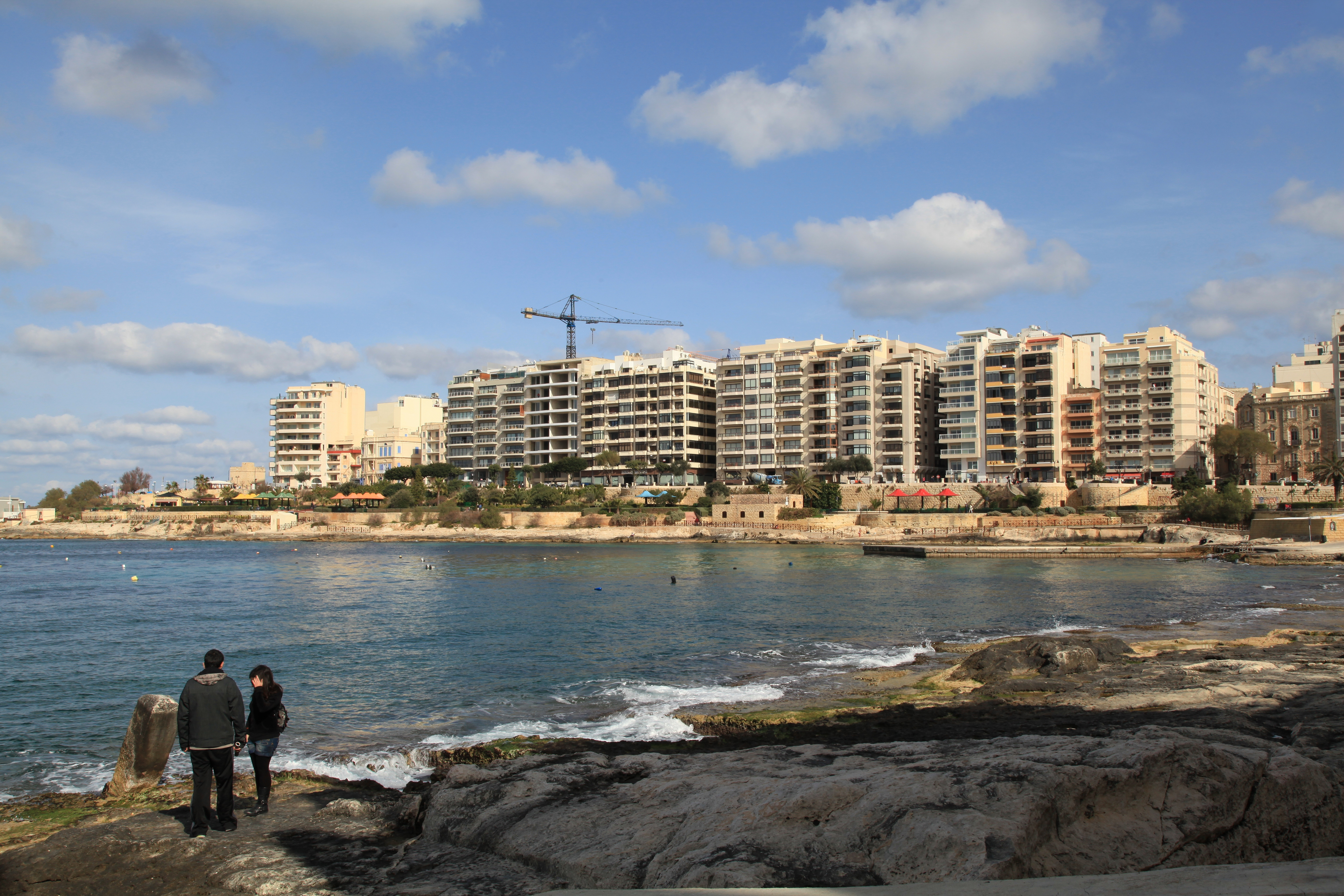
Malta

The following lists events from 2013 in Malta.

== Incumbents ==
From	To	Position	Incumbent	Picture
4 April 2009	4 April 2014	President of Malta	George Abela	
23 March 2004	11 March 2013	Prime Minister of Malta	Lawrence Gonzi	
11 March 2013	13 January 2020	Prime Minister of Malta	Joseph Muscat	
29 April 2010	6 April 2013	Speaker of the House of Representatives	Michael Frendo	
6 April 2013	20 June 2026	Speaker of the House of Representatives	Angelo Farrugia	

== Events ==
=== March ===
- March 9: Maltese General Election, 2013, with a turnout of 93%. Joseph Muscat defeated Lawrence Gonzi in the election.

=== April ===
- April 6: A new inauguration took place which initiated new members of the parliament of Malta.
- April 28: Naxxar Lions F.C. wins their 3rd title of the Maltese First Division.
- April 28: Żebbuġ Ranger F.C. wins the Maltese Second Division.

=== May ===
Birkirkara F.C. wins their 4th title of the Maltese Premier League.

- May 5: Senglea Athletic F.C. wins their 1st title of the Maltese Third Division.
- May 16-18: Malta participates in the 2013 Eurovision Song Contest.
- May 22: The Final of the FA Trophy is played between Qormi and Hibernians at the National Stadium in Ta' Qali ending in a 1-3 victory for Hibernians.

=== September ===
- September 26–29 – The 2013 Battle of Malta; Louis Catarius won the tournament.

== See also ==
- Malta in the Eurovision Song Contest 2013
- 2012–13 Maltese Premier League
- 2012–13 Maltese FA Trophy
- Public holidays in Malta
- Summary of the 9 March 2013 House of Representatives of Malta election results
- 2013 films shot in Malta
- 2013 Maltese General Election
