= 2012 in Malta =

- Decades: 1990s; 2000s; 2010s; 2020s
- See also: History of Malta; List of years in Malta

The following lists events from 2012 in Malta.

== Incumbents ==
From	To	Position	Incumbent	Picture
4 April 2009	4 April 2014	President of Malta	George Abela	
23 March 2004	11 March 2013	Prime Minister of Malta	Lawrence Gonzi	
29 April 2010	6 April 2013	Speaker of the House of Representatives	Michael Frendo	

== Events ==
=== February ===
- February 3–4: Malta Eurovision Song Contest is held at the MFCC in Ta' Qali.
- February 23–27: The 2012 Maltese Carnival is held in Malta and Gozo.

=== March ===
- March 8: TVM HD was launched as the first HD channel with new logos for TVM and TVM 2 (formerly Education 22)
- March 14: Former President Ċensu Tabone died.
- March 25: Malta International Airport celebrates 20 years of service.

=== May ===
Gżira United F.C. wins their 4th title of the Maltese Second Division.

- May 13: Valletta F.C. wins their 21st title of the Maltese Premier League.
- May 13: Melita F.C. wins their 4th title of the Maltese First Division.
- May 27: The Final of the FA Trophy is played between Qormi and Hibernians at the National Stadium in Ta' Qali ending in a 1-3 victory for Hibernians.

=== June ===
- June 29: Mater Dei Hospital celebrated its 5 Year anniversary as the general hospital in Malta.

=== July ===
Malta competed in the 2012 Summer Olympics from July 27 to August 12.

- 24 July – The St. Elmo Bridge is inaugurated in Valletta.

=== August ===
Malta competed in the 2012 Summer Olympics from July 27 to August 12.

- August 20: Former Prime Minister of Malta Dom Mintoff died.

=== September ===
- September 29–30: The 2012 airshow was held with Air Malta's new livery shown in the airshow.

=== November ===
The 2012 Battle of Malta took place in November 2012.

=== December ===
- December 9: F1 driver Lewis Hamilton came to Malta with driving a Vodafone McLaren F1 car.

== See also ==
- Malta in the Eurovision Song Contest 2012
- 2011–12 Maltese Premier League
- 2011–12 Maltese FA Trophy
- Public holidays in Malta
- 2012 films shot in Malta
- New project by Vodafone Malta (2012)
- Mayors of cities or villages in Malta in 2012
