= 2014 in Malta =

- Decades: 1990s; 2000s; 2010s; 2020s
- See also: History of Malta; List of years in Malta

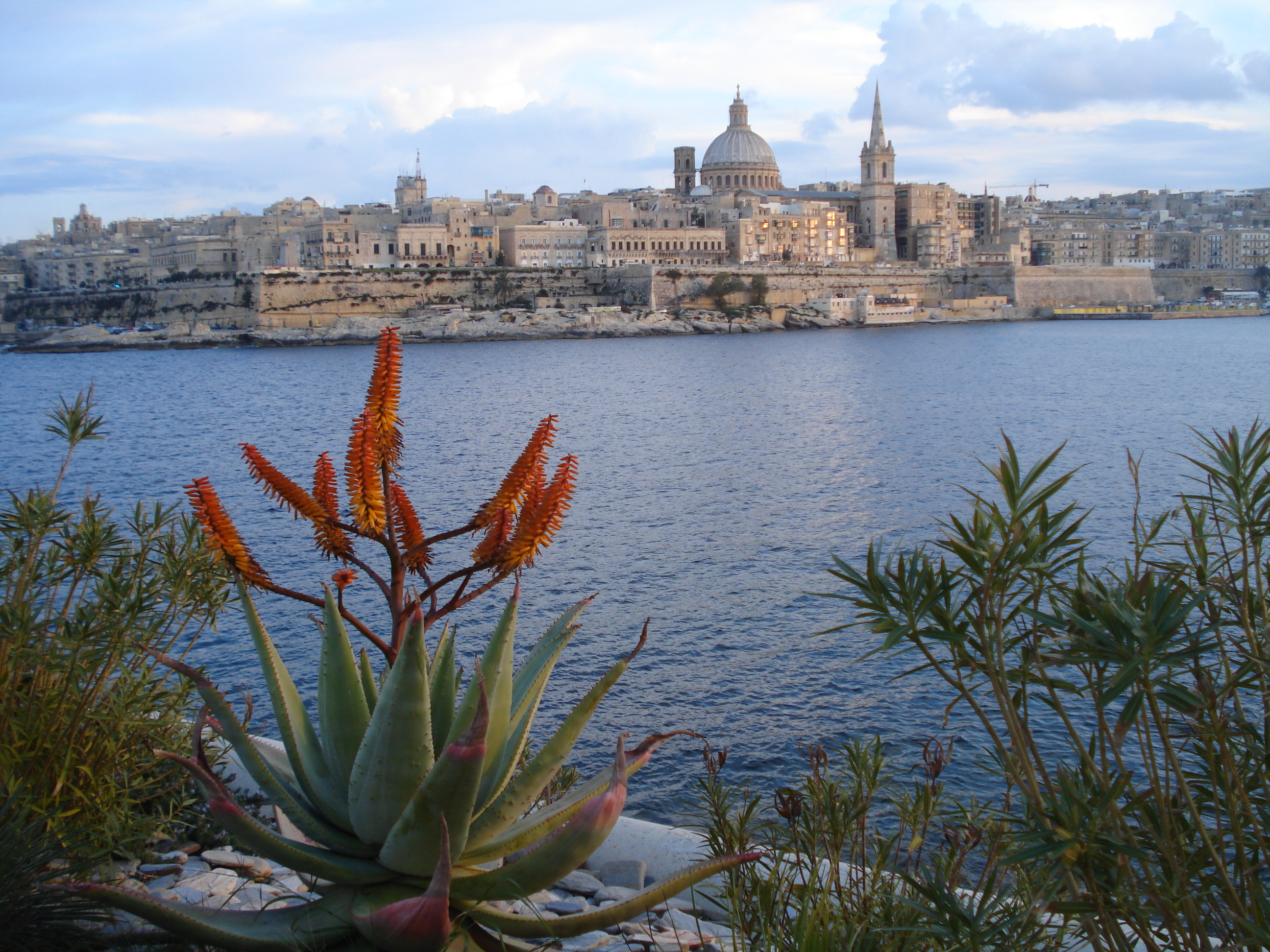
View of Valletta, 7 March 2014

The following lists events from 2014 in Malta.

== Incumbents ==
From	To	Position	Incumbent	Picture
4 April 2009	4 April 2014	President of Malta	George Abela	
4 April 2014	4 April 2019	President of Malta	Marie Louise Coleiro Preca	
11 March 2013	13 January 2020	Prime Minister of Malta	Joseph Muscat	
6 April 2013	20 June 2026	Speaker of the House of Representatives	Angelo Farrugia	

== Events ==
=== January ===
- January 1: Malta issued Public Transport changes. New buses were added later on
- January 20: Former Deputy Prime Minister and Finance Minister Wistin Abela died.

=== February ===
- February 7–23: Malta competed in the 2014 Winter Olympics.

=== April ===
- April 4: Marie Louise Coleiro Preca succeeded George Abela as President of Malta.
- April 14: Malta became the first European state to add recognition of gender identity to its constitution as a protected category.

=== May ===
- May 1: Air Malta celebrated its 40th anniversary with an A320 classic livery.
- May 4: Maltese Olympic sprinter Nestor Jacono died.
- May 9–21: Malta hosted the 2014 UEFA European Under-17 Championship.
- May 24: European Parliament Election took place. The Labour Party won the election, with a 53% majority over the Nationalist Party.

=== June ===
- June 20: The Civil Unions Act, 2014 was published, the Ministry for Home Affairs and National Security published a regulations, based on which, the country recognises same-sex unions performed abroad, regarded by the Ministry as having equivalent status to Malta's civil unions.
- June 30: Journalist, founder and first editor of the newspaper L-Orizzont Anton Cassar died.

=== August ===
- August 12: Former Chief Justice of Malta Hugh Harding died.
- August 14: Actress Madeleine Collinson died.

=== September ===
- September 11: A ship full of migrants sank off Malta and around 500 of them were killed.

=== November ===
- November 14: Former Finance Minister Lino Spiteri died.
- November 15: The Junior Eurovision Song Contest 2014 was held at the Malta Shipbuilding in Marsa.
- November 21–22: The Malta Eurovision Song Contest 2015 was also held at Malta Shipbuilding in Marsa.

== Events from unknown dates ==
- Gozo Channel Line celebrated 35 years since its foundation in 1979.

== See also ==
- Malta in the Eurovision Song Contest 2014
- 2013–14 Maltese Premier League
- Malta at the 2014 Winter Olympics
- 2013–14 Maltese FA Trophy
- Public holidays in Malta
