= 2024 in Malta =

- Decades: 2000s; 2010s; 2020s
- See also: History of Malta; List of years in Malta

Events in the year 2024 in Malta.

== Incumbents ==
From	To	Position	Incumbent	Picture
4 April	Current	President of Malta	Myriam Spiteri Debono	
2019	4 April	President of Malta	George Vella	
2020	Current (Re-elected in 2022)	Prime Minister of Malta	Robert Abela	

== Events ==
- 27 March – 2024 Maltese presidential election: Myriam Spiteri Debono is unanimously elected by the Parliament as the next President of Malta.
- 4 April – Myriam Spiteri Debono is sworn in as the 11th president, succeeding George Vella and becoming the third woman to hold the office.
- 10 May – Chris Fearne resigns as deputy prime minister after charges are filed against him over fraud and misappropriation of funds related to an investigation into a 2015 agreement to privatize three hospitals which was subsequently annulled in 2023 by the courts.
- 6–9 June – 2024 Maltese local elections
- 8 June – 2024 European Parliament election.
- 19 June – The European Commission reprimands Belgium, France, Hungary, Italy, Malta, Poland, and Slovakia for breaking budget rules.

== See also ==
- 2024 in the European Union
- 2024 in Europe
