= 2017 in Malta =

- Decades: 1990s; 2000s; 2010s; 2020s
- See also: History of Malta; List of years in Malta

Events in the year 2017 in Malta.

== Incumbents ==
From	To	Position	Incumbent	Picture
4 April 2014	4 April 2019	President of Malta	Marie Louise Coleiro Preca	
11 March 2013	13 January 2020	Prime Minister of Malta	Joseph Muscat	
6 April 2013	20 June 2026	Speaker of the House of Representatives	Angelo Farrugia	

== Events ==
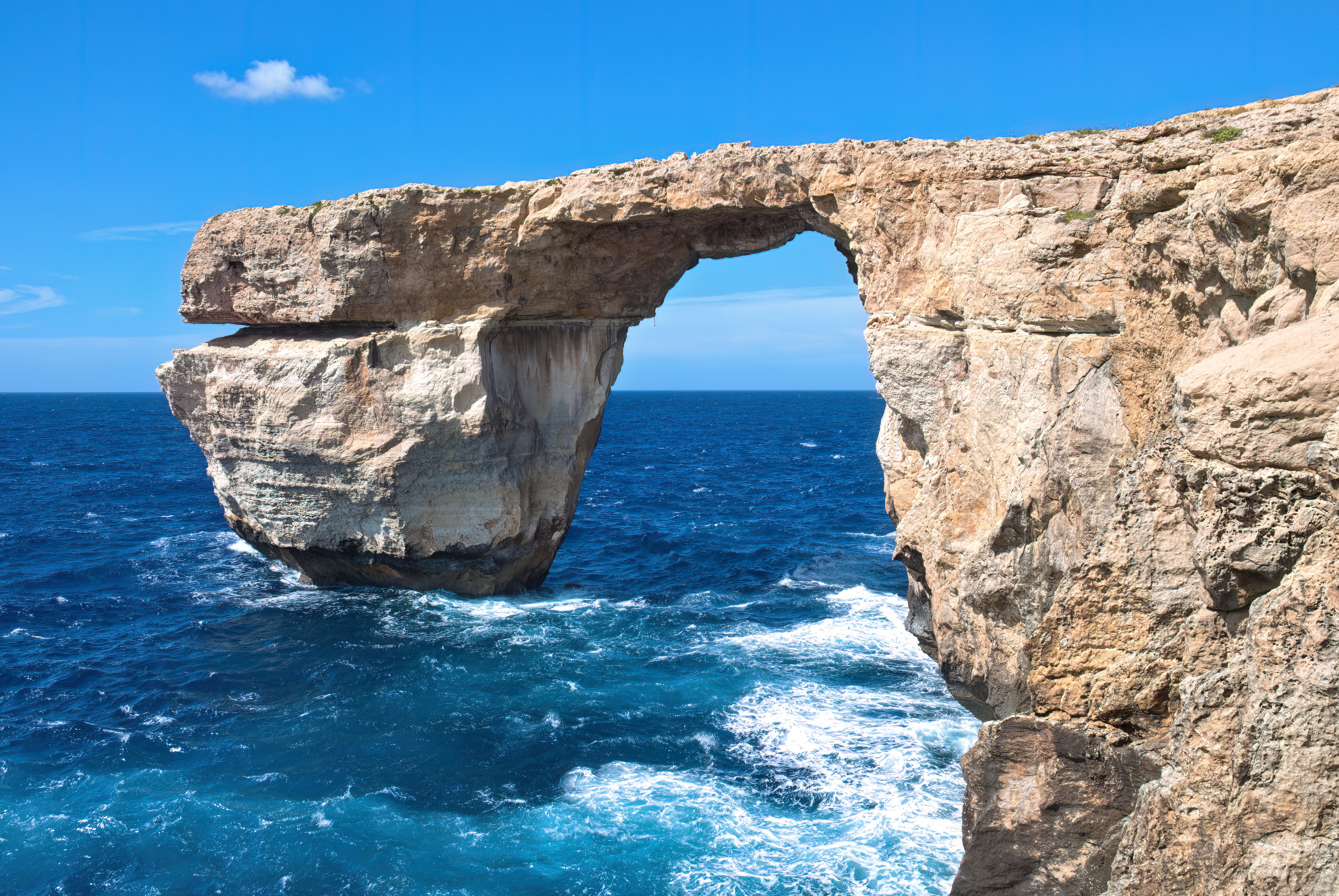
The Azure Window, which collapsed on 8 March 2017

=== January ===
- January 1: Malta takes over the six-month rotating Presidency of the Council of the European Union.

=== February ===
- February 3: in the Malta Declaration (EU), European Union leaders vowed to slow the movement of migrants crossing the Mediterranean.
- February 3: Politician Joe Grima died.

=== March ===
- March 8: The Azure Window collapses after a heavy storm.
- March 25: Malta International Airport celebrates its 25th anniversary.

=== June ===
- June 3: A General Election was held, with the Labour Party winning with a 55% majority over the Nationalist Party.
- June 29: Mater Dei Hospital celebrated its 10th anniversary.

=== October ===
- October 16: Journalist and blogger Daphne Caruana Galizia was assassinated by a car bomb outside her home in Bidnija.

=== November ===
- November 3: Public funeral for Daphne Caruana Galizia at the Rotunda of Mosta.
