= 2016 in Malta =

- Decades: 1990s; 2000s; 2010s; 2020s
- See also: History of Malta; List of years in Malta

The following lists events from 2016 in Malta.

== Incumbents ==
| From | To | Position | Incumbent | Picture |
|---|---|---|---|---|
| 4 April 2014 | 4 April 2019 | President of Malta | Marie Louise Coleiro Preca | |
| 11 March 2013 | 13 January 2020 | Prime Minister of Malta | Joseph Muscat | |
| 6 April 2013 | 20 June 2026 | Speaker of the House of Representatives | Angelo Farrugia | |

== Events ==
=== March ===
- March 21: Archbishop of Malta Joseph Mercieca died.

=== May ===
- May 10–14: Malta participacted in the Eurovision Song Contest 2016

=== June ===
- June 4: Independent MP Marlene Farrugia establishes the Democratic Party.
- June 17: MaltaPost inaugurates the Malta Postal Museum in Valletta.

=== October ===
- October 24: French Fairchild Metroliner crash: a CAE Aviation Fairchild SA227-AT twin turboprop, registration N577MX, crashed on take-off a short distance from the runway. All five people on board died in the accident. The aircraft was taking part in a French-led surveillance operation to counter people smuggling.

=== November ===
- November 20: The Junior Eurovision Song Contest 2016 was held in Valletta.

== See also ==
- Malta in the Eurovision Song Contest 2016
