= 2023 in Malta =

- Decades: 2000s; 2010s; 2020s
- See also: History of Malta; List of years in Malta

Events in the year 2023 in Malta.

== Incumbents ==
From	To	Position	Incumbent	Picture
2019	Current	President of Malta	George Vella	
2020	Current (Re-elected in 2022)	Prime Minister of Malta	Robert Abela	

== Events ==
- 22 May: The Really Loud House premieres on Nickelodeon Malta.

== Deaths ==
- 3 January: Silvio Parnis, 57, politician, MP (1998–2022)
- 15 March: Edwin Grech, 94, politician.
- 5 April: Anne Agius Ferrante, 97, politician, MP (1980–1981)
- 21 June: Paul Cardona, 70, Roman Catholic clergyman
