= 2020 in Malta =

- Decades: 2000s; 2010s; 2020s
- See also: History of Malta; List of years in Malta

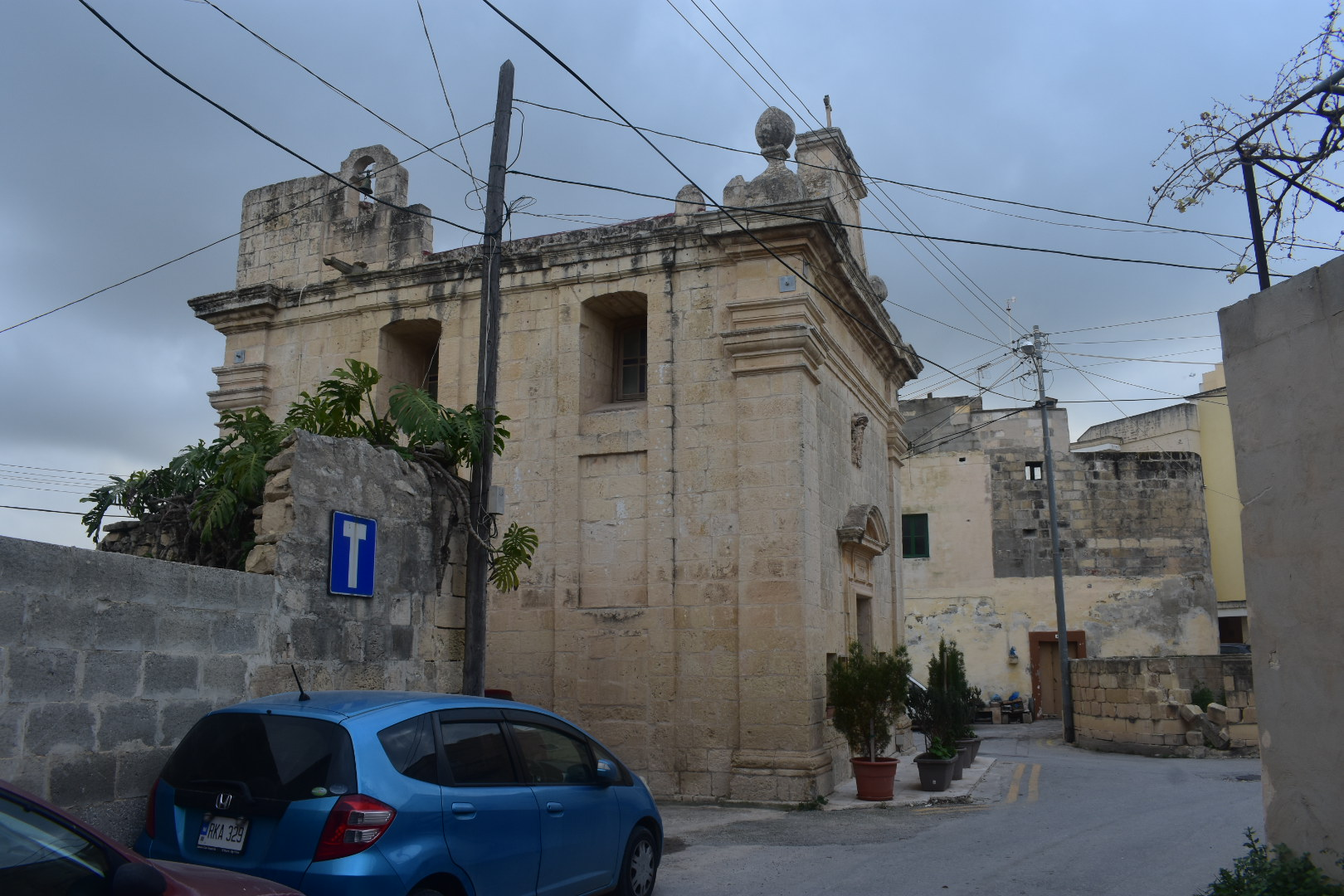
Street in Attard, Malta 2020

Events in the year 2020 in Malta.

== Incumbents ==
- President: George Vella
- Prime Minister: Joseph Muscat (until 13 January) Robert Abela (from 13 January)

== Year ==
January	13	Joseph Muscat resigns as Prime Minister	Event
March	7	The COVID-19 pandemic in Malta begins with the first case imported from Italy.	Event
March	30	The Casagrandes premieres on Nickelodeon Malta.	Event
October	17	Frederick Azzopardi, politician (b. 1949)	Death
November	21	Oliver Friggieri (b. 1947)	Death
