= 2019 Maltese presidential election =

← 2014	2 April 2019	2024 →
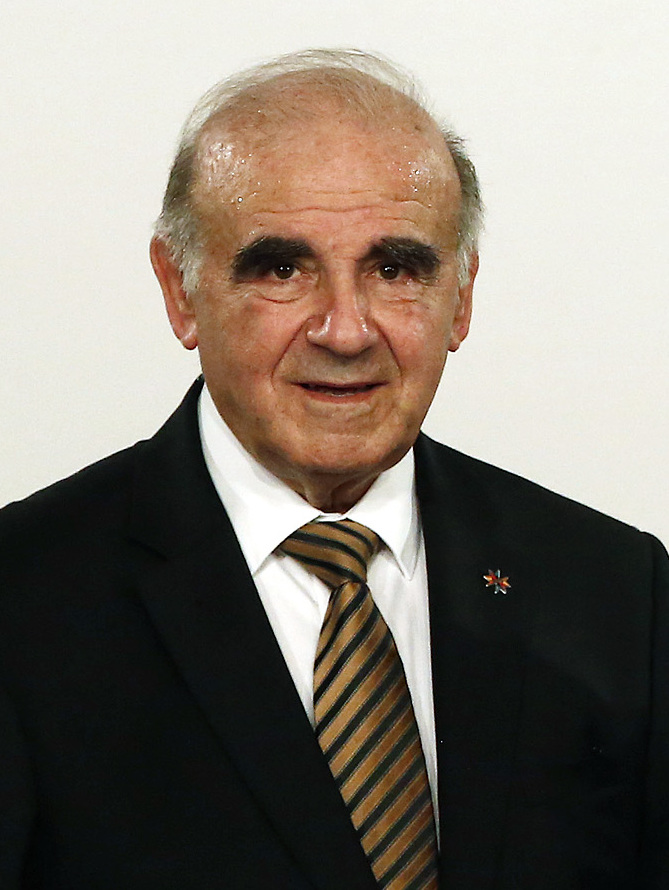
Nominee	George Vella
Party	Labour
Electoral vote	Uncontested
President before election
Marie-Louise Coleiro Preca
Labour
Elected President
George Vella
Labour

The 2019 Maltese presidential election took place on 2 April 2019. Members of the Parliament of Malta voted in an indirect election to approve the appointment of former cabinet minister George Vella, the only nominee, as President of Malta.

Vella's nomination was supported by both the governing Labour Party and opposition Nationalist Party. The Democratic Party announced they supported Vella's nomination for the presidency but would boycott the vote to protest in favour of a constitutional amendment requiring a two-thirds majority to elect the president, and the party's two MPs did not attend the vote.

The election was followed by Vella's formal swearing-in as president on 4 April 2019.
