= 2019 in Malta =

- Decades: 1990s; 2000s; 2010s; 2020s
- See also: History of Malta; List of years in Malta

Events in the year 2019 in Malta.

== Incumbents ==
- President:
  - Marie-Louise Coleiro Preca (to 4 April)
  - George Vella (from 4 April)
- Prime Minister: Joseph Muscat

== Deaths ==
- 13 February - Lino (Carmel) Gauci Borda, 82, politician.

== Year ==
April		Maltese Tuna fishers quotas increased
May	23	Malta AI and Blockchain summit will be held.
May	25	Malta AI and Blockchain summit will be held.
May	25	The European Parliament election and local council elections are to be held.
July	15–25	Malta Jazz Festival
September	26	The Malta International Folk Festival 2019
September		Judge Lorraine Schembri Orland elected to European Court of Human Rights
November	20	Yorgen Fenech detained trying to leave Malta and arrested.
December	1	Announcement of the resignation of prime minister Joseph Muscat over the inquiry of murdered journalist Daphne Caruana Galizia. He will step down at the new year with a new prime minister will be elected on 12 January 2020.
