= 2022 in Malta =

- Decades: 2000s; 2010s; 2020s
- See also: History of Malta; List of years in Malta

Events in the year 2022 in Malta.

== Incumbents ==
From	To	Position	Incumbent	Picture
2019	Current	President of Malta	George Vella	
2020	Current (Re-elected in 2022)	Prime Minister of Malta	Robert Abela	

== Year ==
Ongoing		COVID-19 pandemic in Malta	Event
January	4	Victor Calvagna, Child oncologist (b. 1959) dies, aged 63	Death
January	29	Malta Film Awards	Event
February	20	2022 General Election's date is announced	Event
February	27	Maltese Government closes Maltese airspace to Russian aircraft following the 2022 Russian Invasion of Ukraine	Event
March	26	2022 General Election occurs	Event
March	27	Robert Abela and the Labour Party wins the General Elections	Event
March	28	Robert Abela is sworn in as the Prime Minister of Malta	Event
August	19	The annual Festa Lwien event occurs at Ta' Qali Crafts Village	Event
November	5	Karmenu Mifsud Bonnici, Former Prime Minister of Malta (b. 1933) dies, aged 89.	Death
November	14	The Beverage Container Refund Scheme was opened.	Event
November	22	Bernice Cassar, killed by husband (b.1982) is killed, aged 40.	Death
November	26	A firework factory in Kirkop kills one person with two slightly injured	Event
