= 2018 in Malta =

- Decades: 1990s; 2000s; 2010s; 2020s
- See also: History of Malta; List of years in Malta

Events in the year 2018 in Malta.

== Incumbents ==
- President: Marie-Louise Coleiro Preca
- Prime Minister: Joseph Muscat

== Events ==
- 12 January – the restored Triton Fountain is inaugurated.
- 27 July - A total lunar eclipse takes place in Malta, along with other countries

== Deaths ==
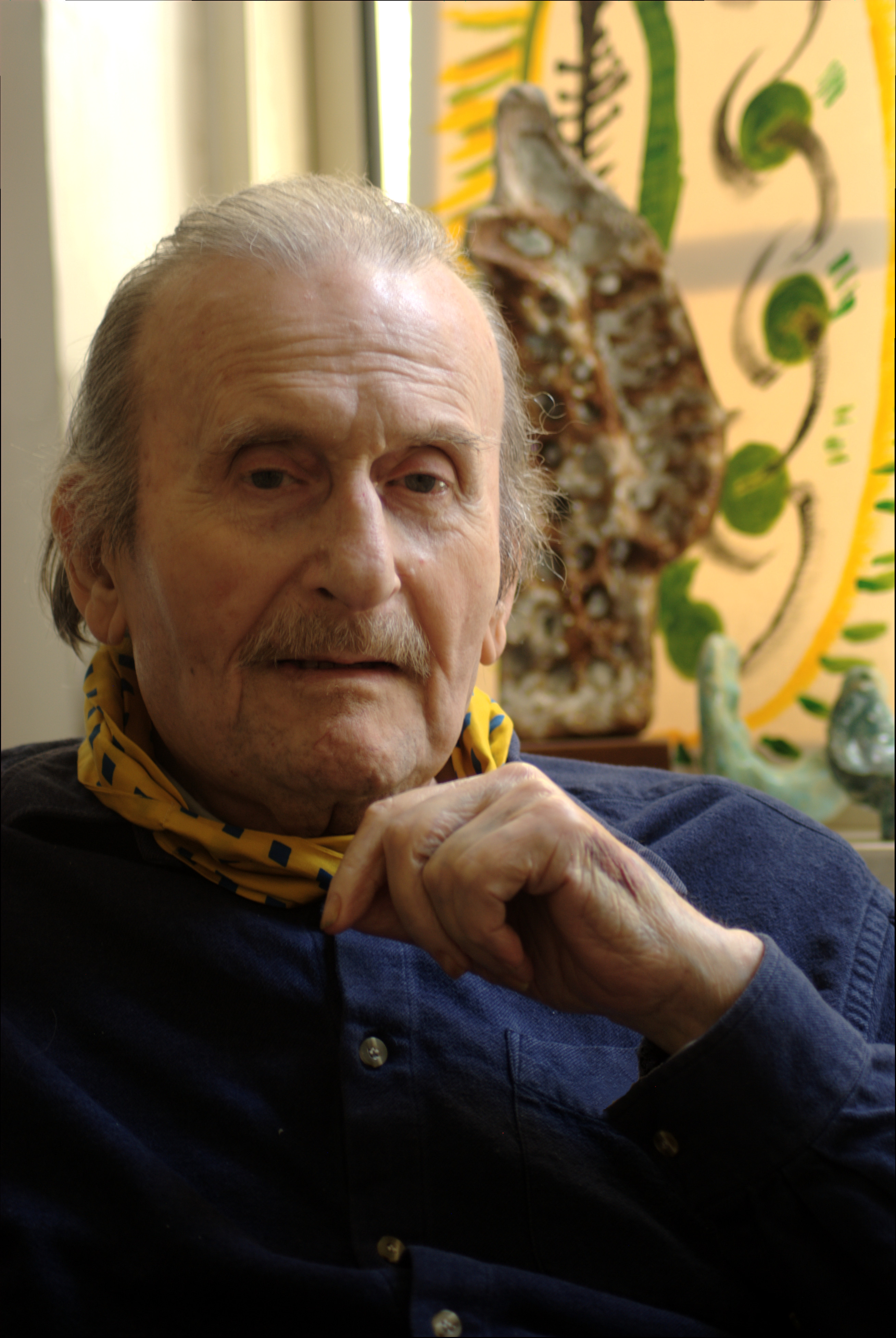
Gabriel Caruana

- 3 January – Francis George Adeodatus Micallef, Roman Catholic prelate (b. 1928).
- 5 January – Emanuel Barbara, Roman Catholic prelate (b. 1949).
- 20 January – Sylvester Carmel Magro, Roman Catholic prelate (b. 1941)
- 12 May – Charles Thake, actor (b. 1927).
- 16 July – Gabriel Caruana, artist (b. 1929).
