= 2021 in Malta =

- Decades: 2000s; 2010s; 2020s
- See also: History of Malta; List of years in Malta

Events in the year 2021 in Malta.

== Incumbents ==
- President: George Vella
- Prime Minister: Robert Abela

== Events ==
COVID-19 pandemic in Malta

=== August ===
- 20 August – Netflix Malta releases The Loud House Movie.

=== December ===
- 20 December – Labour MP Ian Castaldi Paris was fined over 300,000 euros by HM Revenue and Customs.

== Year ==
=== February ===
- Death: Cynthia Turner, pianist (born 1932).

=== October ===
- Maltese 2021 Budget
