= 1956 in Malta =

- Decades: 1930s; 1940s; 1950s; 1960s; 1970s
- See also: History of Malta; List of years in Malta

Events in the year 1956 in Malta.

== Incumbents ==
- Prime Minister: Dom Mintoff

== Events ==
- 11-12 February: 1956 Maltese United Kingdom integration referendum
- 18 February: Żurrieq Scottish Airlines crash

== Sports ==
- 1956–57 Maltese Premier League

== Births ==
- Anton Refalo, politician
- 28 December: Michael Farrugia, politician
