= Edgar Arrigo =

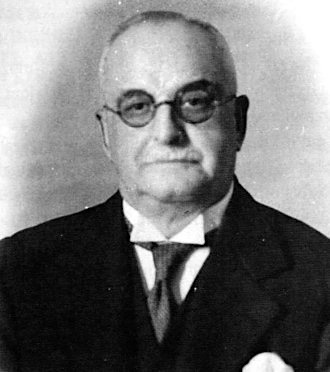
Edgar Arrigo

Edgar Arrigo (15 April 1870 – 27 February 1937) was the first speaker of the House of Representatives in Malta.

Arrigo was born in Valletta, to Osvaldo Arrigo and Susanna Grech, on 15 April 1870, and baptised Edgardo at the Our Lady of Porto Salvo Church in Valletta.

Arrigo studied at the Lyceum in Valletta and on 20 October 1887 joined the Civil Service as clerk in the Chief Secretary's Office under Gerald Strickland. In 1900 he was promoted to Assistant Chief Secretary to Strickland.

On 29 October 1921, during the first sitting of Malta's Legislative Assembly (1921–1923) he was appointed speaker, after being nominated by Antonio Dalli. This nomination was seconded by Gerald Strickland.
