= 2027 in Malta =

- Decades: 2000s; 2010s; 2020s
- See also: History of Malta; List of years in Malta

Events in the year 2027 in Malta.

== Events ==
- 29 October–4 November – 2027 Commonwealth Youth Games

== See also ==
- 2027 in the European Union
- 2027 in Europe
