= Villa Francia =

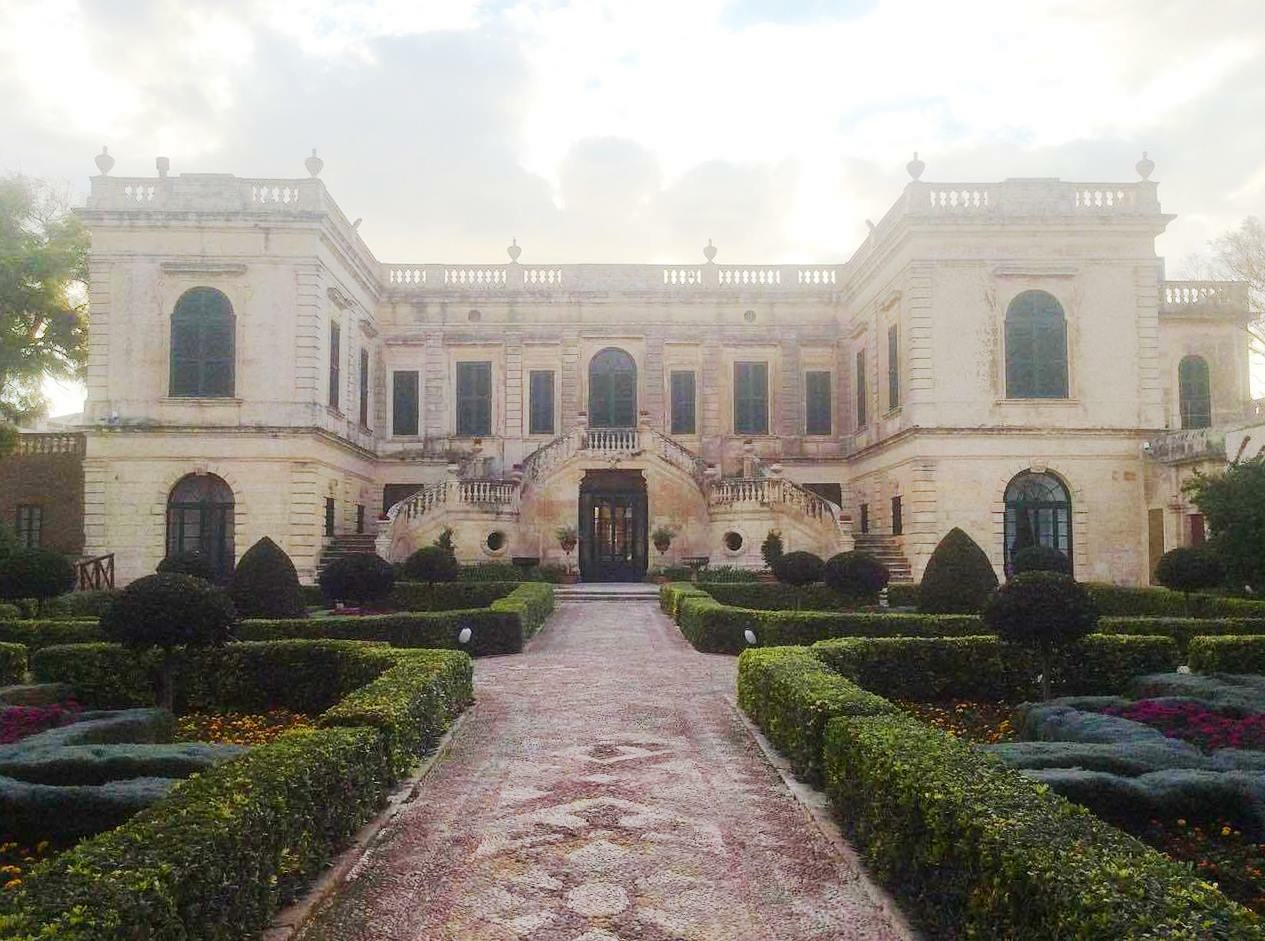
- Villa Francia as seen from the front garden
- Interactive map of the Villa Francia area
- Former names: Palazzo Preziosi, Villa Preziosi, Palazzo Francia

General information
- Status: Intact
- Type: Palace
- Architectural style: Palladian exterior Sicilian Baroque interior
- Location: Lija, Malta
- Coordinates: 35°54′11.86″N 14°26′43.18″E
- Current tenants: Government of Malta
- Named for: Initially Count Francesco Preziosi, now William Nathaniel (Fenton) Francia
- Completed: c. 1757
- Owner: Government of Malta

Technical details
- Material: Limestone

Villa Francia, initially named Villa Preziosi, then named Palazzo Francia, and officially known as Palazzo Francia and Francia Estate, is an 18th-century palace in Lija, Malta. The palace was built circa 1757, by Francesco Preziosi, with baroque architecture that gave a sense of pride and power to noble people at the time. The first ambitious owner became bankrupt with the expenses of the palace, to make it an outstanding and incomparable building, and because of this he was pressured to sell his possession by the Order of St. John to pay his accumulated debts.

The street where the palace is located is named after the initial name of the palace, as Preziosi Street. The palace was bought by the Francia family and later passed to the Government of Malta. It is currently the official residence of the Prime Minister of Malta. The building should not be confused with formerly named Palazzo Francia, today Palazzo Ferreria.

== Description ==
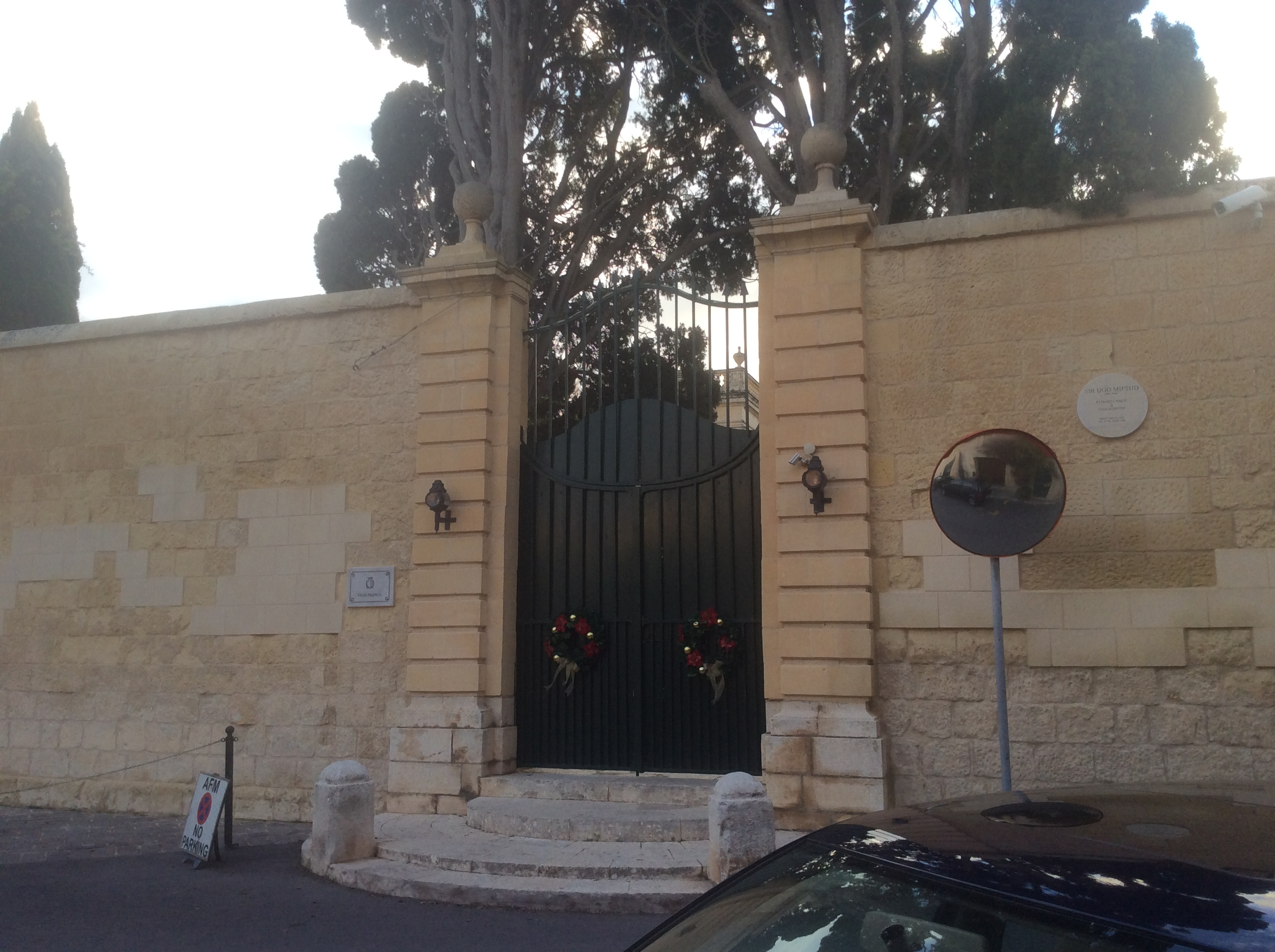
The main gate of the residence

The palace has two floors with a one front garden and other back gardens. The villa is situated in the northern part of Lija. The palace was inspired by Villa Palagonia, at Bagheria in Sicily.

== History ==
=== Hunting lodge ===
The building of Villa Francia was initially a one-storey building used as a hunting lodge when most of Lija was undeveloped. People living in the countryside feared attacks from the Ottoman Empire. When these attacks stopped Lija became a village on the demand for noble people and later for modern buildings. The place may no longer be used as a hunting site.

=== Palazzo/Villa Preziosi ===
The palace is believed to be completed in the late eighteenth century. Additional construction such as the upper storey was added in the late 18th century. Other internal and external works took place in the mid-twentieth century to be used as a residence villa. At first it was called Villa Preziosi.

At one point during the British period the building was the residence of Dr. Waugh. He was also buried within the grounds of the estate.

=== Palazzo/Villa Francia ===
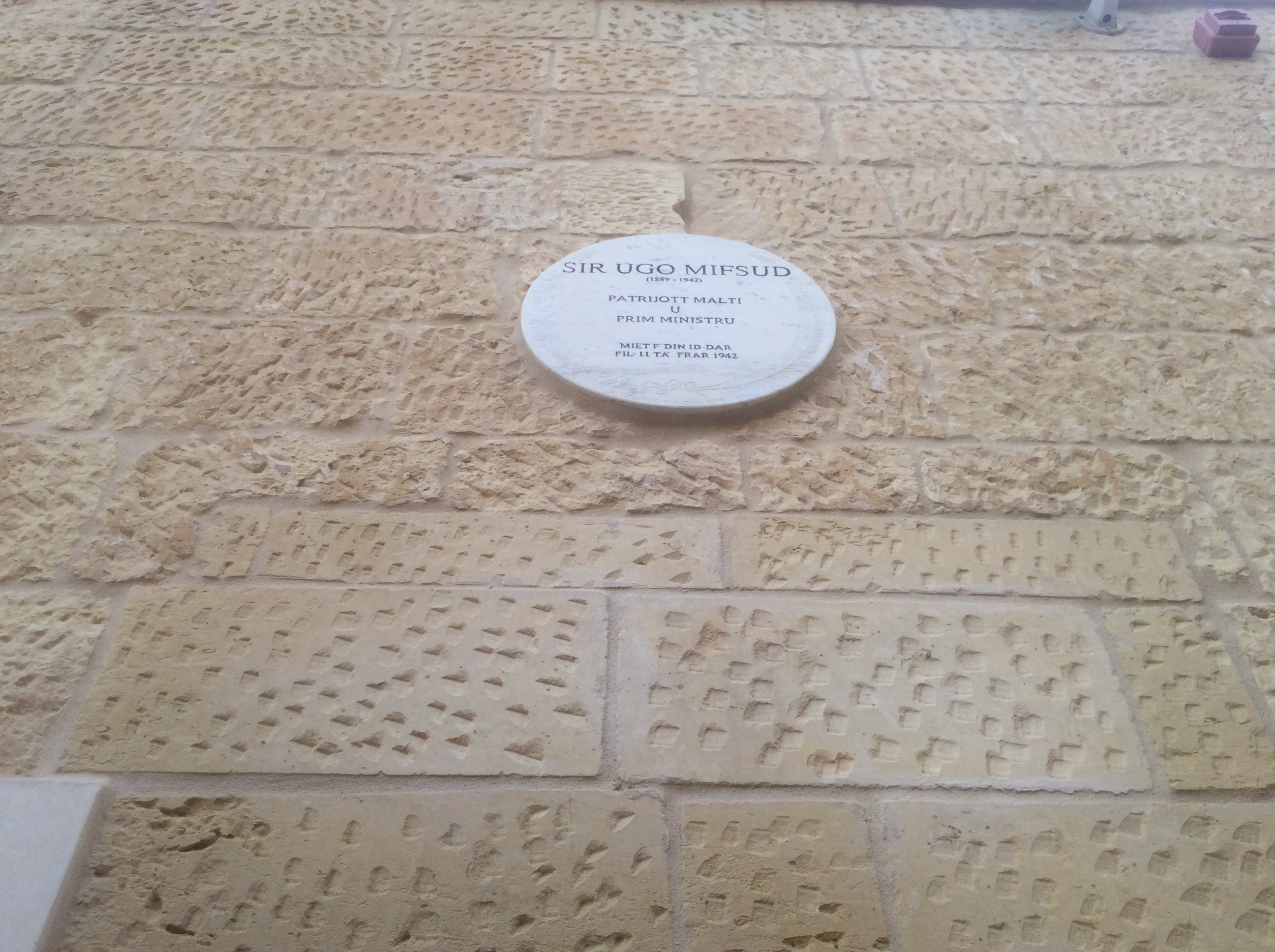
Commemorative plaque at the front entrance wall in the memory of Ugo Pasquale Mifsud who died at the Villa

The palace was named as Villa Francia by the Francia family.

Former Prime Minister of Malta Sir Ugo Pasquale Mifsud and his wife (ne Francia) lived at the palace between September 1924 and August 1927, and between June 1932 and November 1933. Some documents of Ugo Pasquale Mifsud are displayed at the building.

William “Bill” Nathaniel Fenton was adopted by his step father John Baptist Francia (1893-1974) in 1971, soon after the adoption law passed. The now legal father stated in his will that the adopted son is to inherit all his fortune, and if he has no children the Catholic Church in Malta was to inherit everything. As per agreement between the State of Malta and the Local Church, the property passed to the government, even though the Francia kept using it. Fenton and Francia were actually in a romantic same-sex relationship. The two organised LGBT parties at the villa, in the 1960s, when homosexuality was illegal.

== Gardens ==
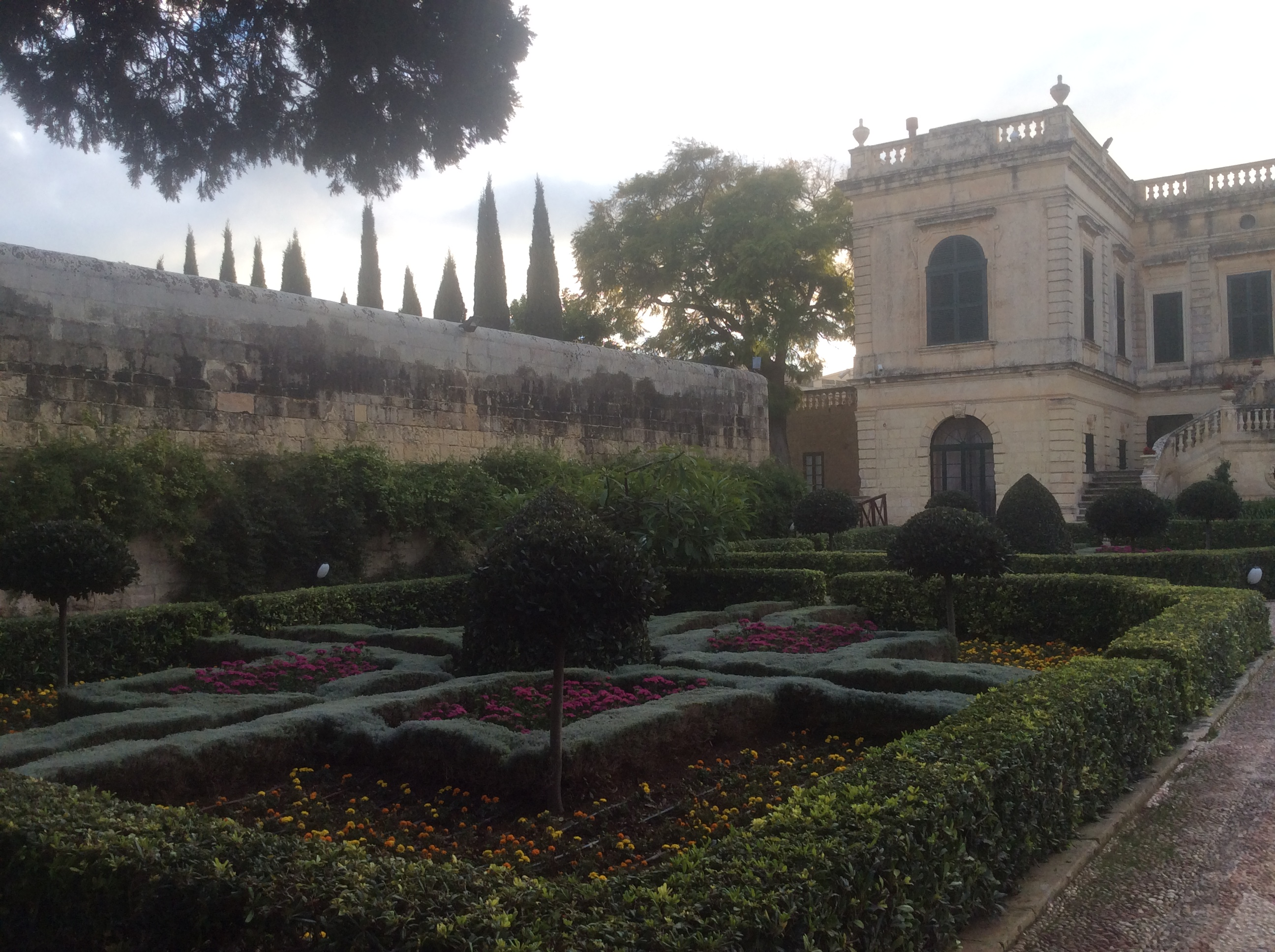
Villa Francia front garden

The estate has always been historically known for its beautiful large gardens. The large landscape of the gardens of the palace has given it the name of Francia Estate. Maps show that approximately 90% of the property consist of the gardens. The large gardens are divided into two areas; the prominent one is located at the front of the palace and the vast larger gardens at the back. In the back garden of the palace a nympheum and a large reservoir could be found until day. A small set aside building was built as a headquarters for the maids and workers at the villa. The palace has some unique Maltese architectural features such as sculptures, a remissa and horse stables. In the garden, a coach room, a water mill and 10 fountains can be found. It has a magnificent belvedere surrounded by two hectares of land overlooking Mosta.

== Modern ==
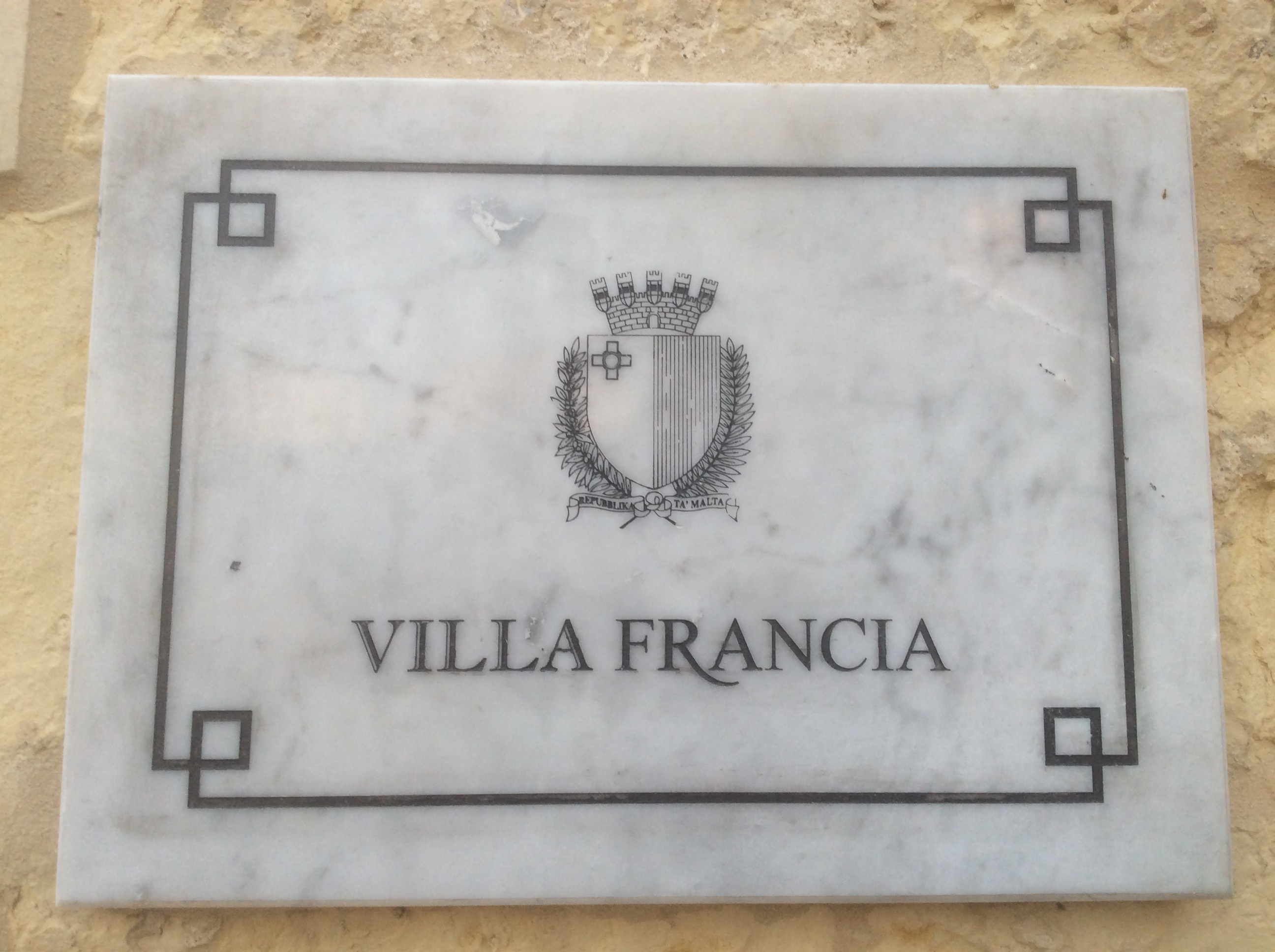
Plaque at the main entrance wall uncovered after the villa passed to the Maltese government

On 27 February 1987 Villa Francia was donated to the Maltese government by the Francia family namely by William Francia who had a same-sex relationship and had no children. A million euro have been invested for the preservation and restoration of Villa Francia by the government partially from EU funds. The palace today serves as the residence of the Prime Minister of Malta where general activities take place. The palace became more notable when Monsignor Charles Scicluna was elected as Bishop of Malta and he was welcomed to the building by Prime Minister Joseph Muscat. The restoration of the entire estate is aimed to bring about regional development by opening it for the public and become a tourist attraction.

== Heritage ==
The Malta Environment and Planning Authority (MEPA) has scheduled Villa Francia as grade 1 national monument. It is also listed on the National Inventory of the Cultural Property of the Maltese Islands.
