= 2024 Maltese presidential election =

← 2019	27 March 2024	2029 →
- Turnout: 94.9% of Maltese Parliamentarian Deputies
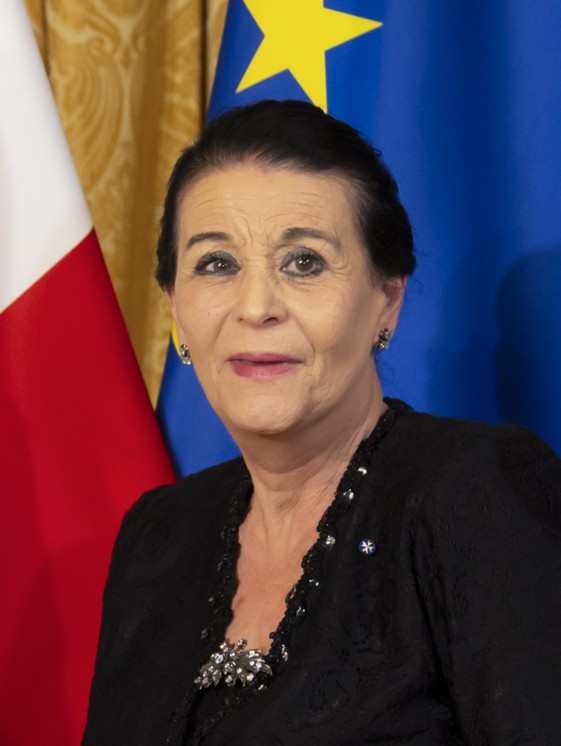
Nominee	Myriam Spiteri Debono
Party	Labour
Electoral vote	75
Percentage	100
President before election
George Vella
Labour
Elected President
Myriam Spiteri Debono
Labour

The 2024 Maltese presidential election took place on 27 March 2024. Members of the Parliament of Malta voted in an indirect election to elect the next President of Malta with former parliament speaker Myriam Spiteri Debono being the only nominee.

Spiteri Debono's nomination was supported by both the governing Labour Party and opposition Nationalist Party and she was elected unanimously in a 75–0 vote out of 79 deputies as Malta's third female and third Gozitan president.
