= 2024 in Europe =

This is a list of events that have taken or will take place in Europe in 2024.

== Incumbents ==
=== Albania ===
(Albania)

=== Andorra ===
(Andorra)

=== Armenia ===
(Armenia)

=== Austria ===
(Austria)

=== Azerbaijan ===
(Azerbaijan)

=== Belarus ===
(Belarus)

=== Belgium ===
(Belgium)

=== Bosnia and Herzegovina ===
(Bosnia and Herzegovina)

=== Bulgaria ===
(Bulgaria)

=== Croatia ===
(Croatia)

=== Cyprus ===
(Cyprus)

=== Czech Republic ===
(Czech Republic)

=== Denmark ===
(Denmark)

=== Estonia ===
(Estonia)

=== European Union ===
- President of the European Commission: Ursula von der Leyen
- President of the Parliament: Roberta Metsola
- President of the European Council: Charles Michel
- Presidency of the Council of the EU:
  - Sweden (January–June)
  - Spain (July–December)

=== Finland ===
(Finland)

=== France ===
(France)

=== Georgia ===
(Georgia (country))

=== Germany ===
(Germany)

=== Greece ===
(Greece)

=== Hungary ===
(Hungary)

=== Iceland ===
(Iceland)

=== Ireland ===
(Republic of Ireland)

=== Italy ===
(Italy)

=== Latvia ===
(Latvia)

=== Liechtenstein ===
(Liechtenstein)

=== Lithuania ===
(Lithuania)

=== Luxembourg ===
(Luxembourg)

=== Malta ===
(Malta)

=== Moldova ===
(Moldova)

=== Monaco ===
(Monaco)

=== Montenegro ===
(Montenegro)

=== Netherlands ===
(Netherlands)

=== North Macedonia ===
(North Macedonia)

=== Norway ===
(Norway)

=== Poland ===
(Poland)

=== Portugal ===
(Portugal)

=== Romania ===
(Romania)

=== Russia ===
(Russia)

=== San Marino ===
(San Marino)

=== Serbia ===
(Serbia)

=== Slovakia ===
(Slovakia)

=== Slovenia ===
(Slovenia)

=== Spain ===
(Spain)

=== Sweden ===
(Sweden)

=== Switzerland ===
(Switzerland)

=== Turkey ===
(Turkey)

=== Ukraine ===
(Ukraine)

=== United Kingdom ===
(United Kingdom)

=== Vatican City ===
(Vatican City)

== Events ==
=== January ===
- 1 January - Belgium assumed the Presidency of the Council of the European Union from Spain.

=== February ===
- 1 February – Armenia officially becomes a member of the International Criminal Court
- 7 February - In Azerbaijan, the 2024 Azerbaijani presidential election took place.
- 25 February - In Belarus, the 2024 Belarusian parliamentary election took place.
- 26 February - In Hungary, the 2024 Hungarian presidential election took place.

=== March ===
- 7 March: Sweden joins NATO.
- 10 March: In Portugal, the 2024 Portuguese legislative election took place.
- 15-17 March: In Russia, the 2024 Russian presidential election took place.
- 27 March; In Malta, the 2024 Maltese presidential election took place.

=== April ===
- 6 April: In Slovakia, the 2024 Slovak presidential election took place.
- 17 April: In Croatia, the 2024 Croatian parliamentary election took place.
- 21 April: In Kosovo, the 2024 North Kosovo referendum took place.
- 24 April: In North Macedonia, the 2024 North Macedonian presidential election took place.

=== May ===
- 8 May – In North Macedonia, the 2024 North Macedonian parliamentary election took place.
- 12 May - In Lithuania, the 2024 Lithuanian presidential election took place.
- 15 May – Attempted assassination of Robert Fico: Prime Minister Robert Fico is critically injured in a shooting in Handlova. A suspect is apprehended and identified as a 71-year-old writer from Levice.

=== June ===
- 1 June - In Iceland, the 2024 Icelandic presidential election took place.
- 9 June – In Belgium, 2024 Belgian federal election took place.
- 9 June - In Bulgaria, June 2024 Bulgarian parliamentary election took place.
- 9 June - In San Marino, 2024 San Marino general election took place.
- 13 June – Hungary is fined 200 million euros, in addition to a daily one-million-euro fine by the European Court of Justice for "deliberately evading” compliance with European Union laws on migration and asylum seekers.
- 25 June: the European Union has decided to start full membership negotiations with Moldova and Ukraine.
- 30 June – Hungarian Prime Minister Viktor Orbán (Fidesz), former Czech Prime Minister Andrej Babiš (ANO 2011) and former Austrian Minister of the Interior Herbert Kickl (FPÖ) form a new European group called the Patriots for Europe.

=== July ===
- 1 July – The start of the 2024 Hungarian Presidency of the Council of the European Union.
- 4 July - In United Kingdom, the 2024 United Kingdom general election took place.
- 7 July - In France, the second round in 2024 French legislative election took place.
- 10 July – the German Alternative for Germany (AfD) forms a new European group called Europe of Sovereign Nations. It will have Hungary's Our Homeland Movement, Bulgaria's Revival, Czech Freedom and Direct Democracy, Slovak Republic Movement.

=== September ===
- 1 September – In Germany, 2024 Thuringian state election: The Alternative for Germany AfD wins a plurality (32%) in elections for the Landtag of Thuringia, marking the first time that a far-right party won a state election in Germany since World War II.
- 1 September - In Azerbaijan, the 2024 Azerbaijani parliamentary election took place.
- 20/21 September - In Czech Republic, the 2024 Czech Senate election took place.
- 29 September – In Austria, 2024 Austrian legislative election: The Freedom Party of Austria (FPÖ) place first, winning 29.2% of the vote and achieving its best result in the party's history. It also marks the first time that a far-right party won a National election in Austria since World War II.

=== October ===
- 13 October – In Lithuania, 2024 Lithuanian parliamentary election took place.
- 20 October – In Moldova, 2024 Moldovan presidential election took place.
- 20 October - In Moldova, the 2024 Moldovan European Union membership constitutional referendum took place.
- 26 October – In Georgia, 2024 Georgian parliamentary election took place.
- 27 October – In Bulgaria the October 2024 Bulgarian parliamentary election took place.

=== November ===
- 24 November – In Romania, 2024 Romanian presidential election will take place. (first round): Far-right independent Călin Georgescu wins a plurality of votes for the presidency and advances to the runoff along with centre-right candidate Elena Lasconi.
- 28 November – 2024 Romanian presidential election: The Constitutional Court of Romania orders a recount of the votes cast in the first round following an appeal.
- 30 November – In Iceland, 2024 Icelandic parliamentary election will take place.

=== December ===
- 1 December – In Romania, 2024 Romanian parliamentary election will take place.
- 6 December – 2024 Romanian presidential election: The Constitutional Court of Romania annuls the results of the first round of the presidential election after intelligence agencies alleged that Călin Georgescu benefited from a coordinated online campaign by Russia to promote his candidacy.
- 20 December – A court in Italy's Palermo acquits deputy prime minister Matteo Salvini of charges relating to the illegal detention of 100 migrants that he refused to disembark from the humanitarian rescue vessel Open Arms that docked in Lampedusa in 2019.

=== Elections ===
- 6–9 June – 2024 European Parliament election

== See also ==
- 2024 in the European Union
- List of state leaders in Europe in 2024
- 2024 in politics and government
