= Michael Frendo =

Maltese politician (born 1955)

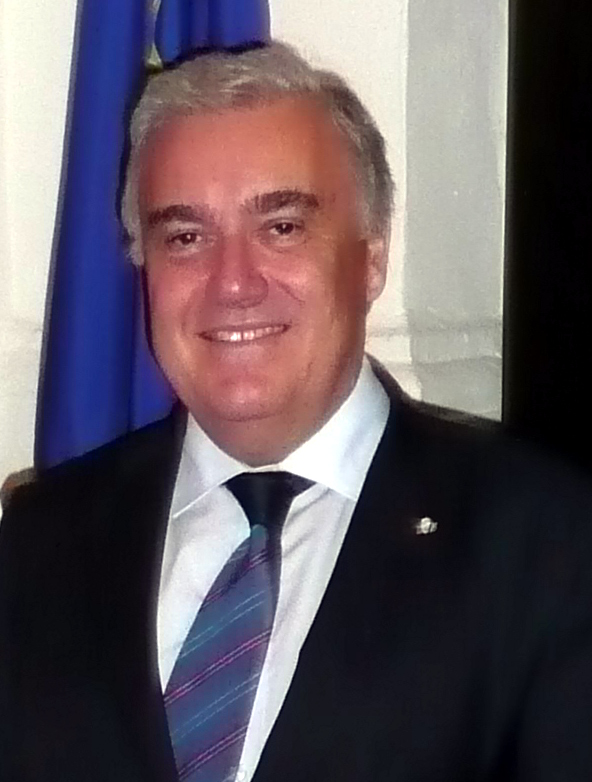

Speaker of the House of Representatives of Malta
- In office 29 April 2010 – 6 April 2013
- Preceded by: Louis Galea
- Succeeded by: Angelo Farrugia

Minister of Foreign Affairs
- In office July 2004 – March 2008

Parliamentary Secretary of Foreign Affairs
- In office March 2004 – July 2004

Minister for Transport, Communications and Technology
- In office 1994–1996

Minister for Youth and Arts
- In office 1992–1994

Parliamentary Secretary for Youth, Culture and Consumer Protection
- In office 1990–1992

Personal details
- Born: 29 July 1955 (age 70)
- Party: PN
- Spouse(s): Irene Frendo (née Brincat); 3 children

Michael Frendo (born 29 July 1955) is a former Maltese politician who currently is a lawyer and consultant. Previously he served in the government of Malta in various functions including as Minister of Foreign Affairs from 2004 to 2008 and Speaker of the House of Representatives of Malta from 2010 to 2013. He is from Floriana and the brother of Henry Frendo.

== Political life ==
Frendo was first elected to the House of Representatives of Malta in 1987 and was re-elected in 1992, 1996, 1998 and 2003. From 1990 to 1992 he was Minister of State (Parliamentary Secretary) for Youth, Culture and Consumer Protection. From 1992 to 1994 he was Minister of Youth and Arts. From 1994 to 1996 he was Minister of Transport, Communications and Technology.

He was Parliamentary Secretary (Minister of State) in the Ministry of Foreign Affairs from March to July 2004 before becoming Minister of Foreign Affairs on 3 July 2004, replacing John Dalli. Frendo was not re-elected to the House of Representatives in the March 2008 parliamentary election and was consequently replaced as Foreign Minister on 12 March 2008. However, he regained a parliamentary seat in a casual election on 17 April 2008, after Cabinet had already been formed. After serving as Chairman of the Foreign and European Affairs Committee, in 2010, Michael Frendo was unanimously elected as Speaker of the House of Representatives, Malta's Parliament.

Frendo has been a member of the European Convention on the Future of Europe and a signatory to its Draft Constitutional Treaty, as well as a signatory to the Treaty establishing a Constitution for Europe and to the Treaty of Lisbon which superseded it and which is came into force on 1 December 2009. The only other person in Europe who is a signatory to all three documents leading to the new constitutional framework of the European Union is EU Commissioner and former Belgian Foreign Minister Karel De Gucht. In April 2010 he was nominated as Speaker of the House of Representatives, succeeding Louis Galea, who resigned office after being appointed as the Maltese representative in the European Court of Auditors.

Michael Frendo is a member of the European Commission for Democracy through Law (Council of Europe's Venice Commission on constitutional matters) since June 2013.

Back in private practice as a lawyer and consultant, he is the Managing Director of Frendo Advisory, a firm specialising in offering immigration advise. He is also the (non-executive) Chairman of Banif Bank (Malta) Plc. Michael Frendo is a (part-time) Senior Lecturer at the Faculty of Laws of the University of Malta.

Michael Frendo has received honours from a number of countries including Spain, Portugal, Italy, Austria, Cyprus, Latvia and Tunisia. In December 2013, he was appointed Companion of the Order of Merit (K.O.M.) of the Republic of Malta.

== Books ==
Frendo has published numerous books based on European Affairs: The Future of Europe (2003), Europe, The Case for Membership (1996), Malta in the Council of Europe (1990), Malta in the European Community - Commercial and Legal Considerations (1989), and Is Malta Burning? (1981). He also has written on a varied number of legal issues, in particular relating to Information and Communications technologies, Maritime affairs and the European Union.
