= Louis Pace =

Maltese footballer (1948–2025)

Personal information
- Date of birth: 24 April 1948
- Place of birth: Valletta, Crown Colony of Malta
- Date of death: 20 October 2025 (aged 77)
- Position: Defender

Senior career*
Years	Team	Apps	(Gls)
1966–1974	Valletta	89	(1)

International career
1971–1972	Malta	5	(0)
- * Club domestic league appearances and goals

Louis Pace (24 April 1948 – 20 October 2025) was a Maltese footballer who played as a defender.

== Club career ==
Pace played his entire career for Valletta, making his debut for them on 6 January 1966 in a Cassar Cup game against Hibernians. He won the 1974 league title with the club and captained them in the UEFA Cup match against Inter Milan.

== International career ==
Pace made his debut for Malta in a May 1971 European Championship qualification match away against England and earned a total of five caps (no goals). His final international was a May 1972 World Cup qualification match away against Hungary.

== Personal life and death ==
Pace's family ran Valletta's Britannia Bar and he started a well-known restaurant called Wiġi’s restaurant, in St. Julian's.

Pace died on 20 October 2025, at the age of 77.
