= Angelo Farrugia =

Maltese politician

Angelo Farrugia MP
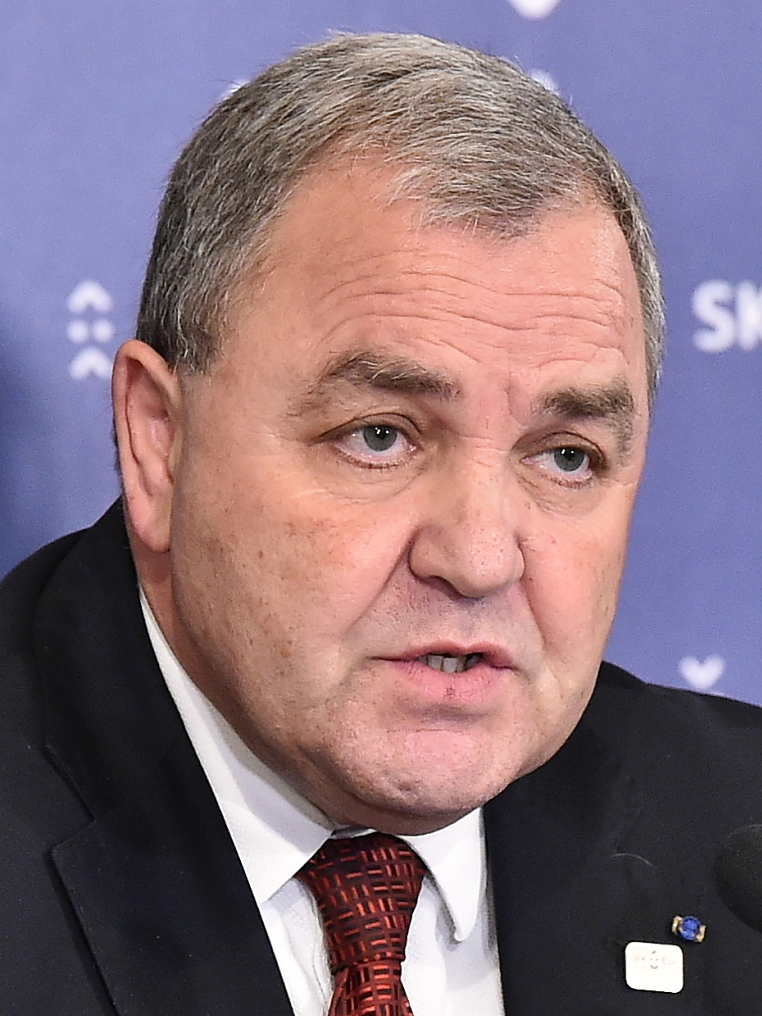
- Farrugia in 2017

Speaker of the House of Representatives
- In office 6 April 2013 – 20 June 2026
- President: George Abela; Marie-Louise Coleiro Preca; George Vella; Myriam Spiteri Debono
- Prime Minister: Joseph Muscat; Robert Abela
- Preceded by: Michael Frendo
- Succeeded by: Carmelo Abela

Deputy Leader of the Labour Party
- In office 13 June 2008 – 20 December 2012
- Leader: Joseph Muscat
- Preceded by: Charles Mangion
- Succeeded by: Louis Grech

Member of Parliament
- Incumbent
- Assumed office 27 October 1996

Personal details
- Born: December 29, 1955 (age 70) Mosta, British Malta
- Party: Labour (PL)
- Spouse: Carmen née Zammit
- Children: Caroline
- Profession: Advocate

Angelo "Anġlu" Farrugia (born 29 December 1955) is a Maltese politician and the current Speaker of the House of Representatives of Malta. Previously he served Deputy Leader of the Labour Party, a Member of Parliament and Shadow Minister for work, workers' rights and parliamentary affairs.

== Family ==
Farrugia was born in Mosta and is married to Carmen née Zammit and they have a daughter, Caroline, a current Magistrate within the judiciary of Malta.

== Political life ==
Prior to entering politics, Farrugia had served from 1977 to 1996 as a police officer reaching the rank of Superintendent. In 1987 Farrugia enrolled in the law course at the University of Malta, eventually obtaining the degrees of LL.D. and M.Jur. (magna cum laude).

He was first elected to Parliament in 1996, and subsequently elected again in 1998, 2003 and 2008. He served on the House Committee of the Consideration of Bills as Chairman (1996–98) and as member (since 1998). Between 1998 and 2008 Farrugia served as Shadow Minister for Justice and in 2008 was elected Labour's Deputy Leader of Parliamentary Affairs. He was also appointed Opposition Spokesperson for Employment and Workers' Rights in the same year.

Farrugia resigned as Deputy Leader in 2012 following comments he had made about a member of the judiciary. Farrugia subsequently announced his decision to not stand for the general election in 2013.

In April 2013 he was nominated as Speaker of the House of Representatives, succeeding Michael Frendo, and continues to hold the seat as part of the Thirteenth Legislature (2017-current).

== Activities in international organisations ==
Farrugia was appointed as Head of Malta's Organization for Security and Co-operation in Europe (OSCE) Parliamentary Assembly delegation in 1996.

He has since served on a number of EU and OSCE missions as an international observer for various elections, including Georgia (1999), the Presidential Election in Palestinian Authority (2004), the 2004 US Presidential Election, the Montenegrin independence referendum (2006) and the Presidential and Parliamentary Elections in Zambia 2006.

He is also a member of the OSCE Parliamentary Assembly's Standing Committee on Human Rights.

In 2016, Farrugia was elected as the Chairperson of the Small Branches network of the Commonwealth Parliamentary Association (CPA) for a three-year term. The CPA Small Branches network represents those Parliaments and Legislatures in the Commonwealth with a population of less than 500,000 people.

Also in 2016, Farrugia's daughter was appointed as a Magistrate serving in Malta's Law Courts. Many saw this move as a way by the Labour Party to keep Farrugia happy after his negative comments addressed to his previous Party Leader, the former Labour Prime Minister Joseph Muscat.

Party political offices
Preceded by Charles Mangion	Deputy Leader of the Malta Labour Party; Parliamentary Affairs; 2008–2012	Succeeded by Louis Grech
