= Myriam Spiteri Debono =

President of Malta since 2024

Her Excellency Myriam Spiteri Debono KUOM
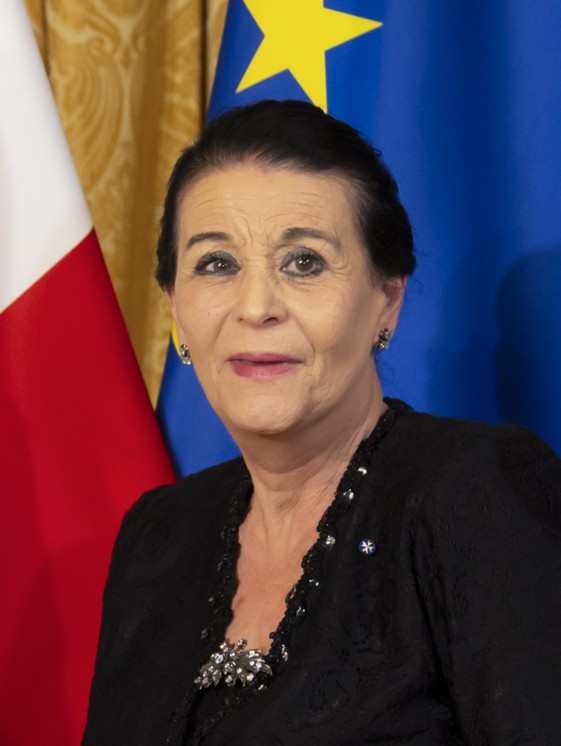
- Spiteri Debono in 2024

11th President of Malta
- Incumbent
- Assumed office 4 April 2024
- Prime Minister: Robert Abela
- Preceded by: George Vella

Speaker of the House of Representatives
- In office 5 December 1996 – 24 October 1998
- Prime Minister: Alfred Sant; Eddie Fenech Adami
- Preceded by: Lawrence Gonzi
- Succeeded by: Anton Tabone

Chairperson of the Press Ethics Commission
- In office 1999–2002

General Secretary of the Labour Party's Women Group
- In office 1983–1984
- Leader: Dom Mintoff; Karmenu Mifsud Bonnici

Executive Member of the Partit Laburista (Labour Party)
- In office 1981–2003
- Leader: Dom Mintoff; Karmenu Mifsud Bonnici; Alfred Sant

Personal details
- Born: Miriam Zammit; 25 October 1952 (age 74) Victoria, Gozo, Crown Colony of Malta
- Party: Labour
- Spouse: Anthony Spiteri Debono (died 2025)
- Children: 3
- Education: University of Malta
- Occupation: Notary public
- Website: president.gov.mt

Myriam Spiteri Debono (Note: Alternatively spelled Miriam Spiteri Debono) (née Zammit; born 25 October 1952) is a Maltese politician who is the 11th and current president of Malta. She is the first Gozitan woman to be elected to the position. She was also the Speaker of the House of Representatives of Malta from 1996 to 1998, the first woman to hold that position.

== Early life and career ==
Spiteri Debono was born Miriam Zammit in Victoria, Gozo, to Pawlu Zammit and his wife. She received her formal childhood education in Gozo and later attended the University of Malta where she studied English Literature and Linguistics, graduating in 1973, and founded the Socialist Students Union. She also studied law and graduated as a Notary Public in 1980.

Her first public office appointments included that of chair of the Cooperatives Board, and as a founding member of the Gender Equality Commission.

She was a candidate for the Malta Labour Party in five general elections (1981, 1987, 1992, 1996, 2003), but was never elected as a member of parliament. However, she was elected to the party's national executive in 1982 and served as the party's propaganda secretary.

Spiteri Debono served as president of the Malta Labour Party's women section between 1993 and 1996.

In September 1996, she was appointed Malta's Speaker of the House of Representatives by Prime Minister Alfred Sant. She was the first woman to serve in this role in Malta and was replaced by Anton Tabone in October 1998.

In January 2023, she was proposed for the role of Standards Commissioner by the Nationalist Party, however, she declined to be formally considered for the role claiming that she was not suited for it nor was she interested in taking the position.

== Presidency ==
On 21 March 2024, she was reported to be the front runner to be appointed President of the Republic of Malta. The following week, this was confirmed in a joint statement issued from the offices of the Prime Minister and the Leader of the Opposition. Malta's House of Representatives voted unanimously to elect Spiteri Debono as Malta's 11th President on 27 March 2024, becoming the first president to be elected using the new constitutional reforms of 2020 including the new requirement of two-thirds of the parliament's approval for the presidential nominee.

Spiteri Debono is the third woman to serve as President of Malta, after Agatha Barbara and Marie-Louise Coleiro Preca. She is also the third person from Gozo to be appointed to this office, following Anton Buttigieg and Ċensu Tabone.

She was inaugurated on 4 April 2024.

At the time of her appointment she admitted to being a technophobe; owning a flip phone and preferring to dictate her letters and other correspondence to an assistant, leaving emails to an email address in her husband's name.

== Personal life ==
Spiteri Debono lived most of her adult life in Birkirkara, Malta. She was married to notary Dr. Anthony Spiteri Debono, who died on 24 July 2025, at the age of 78. They have three children and four grandchildren.

== Honours ==
=== National honours ===
- Grand Master and Companion of Honour of the National Order of Merit, Malta, by right as a President of Malta
- Grand Master of the Xirka Ġieħ ir-Repubblika, by right as a President of Malta

=== Armorial bearings ===
Coat of arms of Myriam Spiteri Debono
Notes Granted on 15 May 2025 (by the Office of the Chief Herald of Arms of Malta). Crest An escutcheon Teal (bleu celeste) charged with three intertwined arches increasing in height from dexter to sinister Or standing on a base wavy Argent and Azure. Escutcheon Tierced per pale: 1 Or, upon a fess Azure a lion passant Gules holding a sword point upwards Argent [for Spiteri]; 2 Azure, upon a base Vert a tree eradicated proper, supported at sinister by a man proper wearing a loincloth Argent and holding in his sinister a spear point upwards Or and in chief three mullets of six points in fess Or [for Debono], 3 Gules, two hands clasped throughout proper, vested Argent, holding a dagger point upwards Argent, hilted Or, in chief three mullets of six points in fess Or and in base a sprig of olive fesswise proper [for Zammit]. Supporters A pair of lions combattant Or langued Gules. Compartment A grass mound. Motto SERVIRE CUM MODESTIA (Latin for 'To serve with humility'). Orders National Order of Merit (Malta) and Xirka Ġieħ ir-Repubblika.

== Notes ==
Political offices
Preceded by Lawrence Gonzi	Speaker of the House of Representatives; 1996–1998	Succeeded by Anton Tabone
Preceded by George Vella	President of Malta; 2024–present	Incumbent
