= Parliament of Malta =

Constitutional legislative body in Malta

Parliament of Malta Il-Parlament ta' Malta

Type
- Type: Unicameral
- Houses: House of Representatives

History
- Founded: 1921

Leadership
- President: Myriam Spiteri Debono since 4 April 2024
- Speaker: Carmelo Abela since 20 June 2026
- Deputy Speaker: Bernard Grech since 20 June 2026
- Leader of the House: Ian Borg, Labour since 17 September 2024
- Leader of the Opposition: Alex Borg, Nationalist since 10 September 2025

Structure
- Seats: 79 (Note: Additional seats are allocated according to the Proportionality formula and the Gender Mechanism Quota.)
- Political groups: Government (42): Labour (42); Opposition (37): Nationalist (37)

Elections
- Voting system: Single transferable vote (not counting members co-opted to fulfill gender quota)
- Last election: 30 May 2026

Meeting place
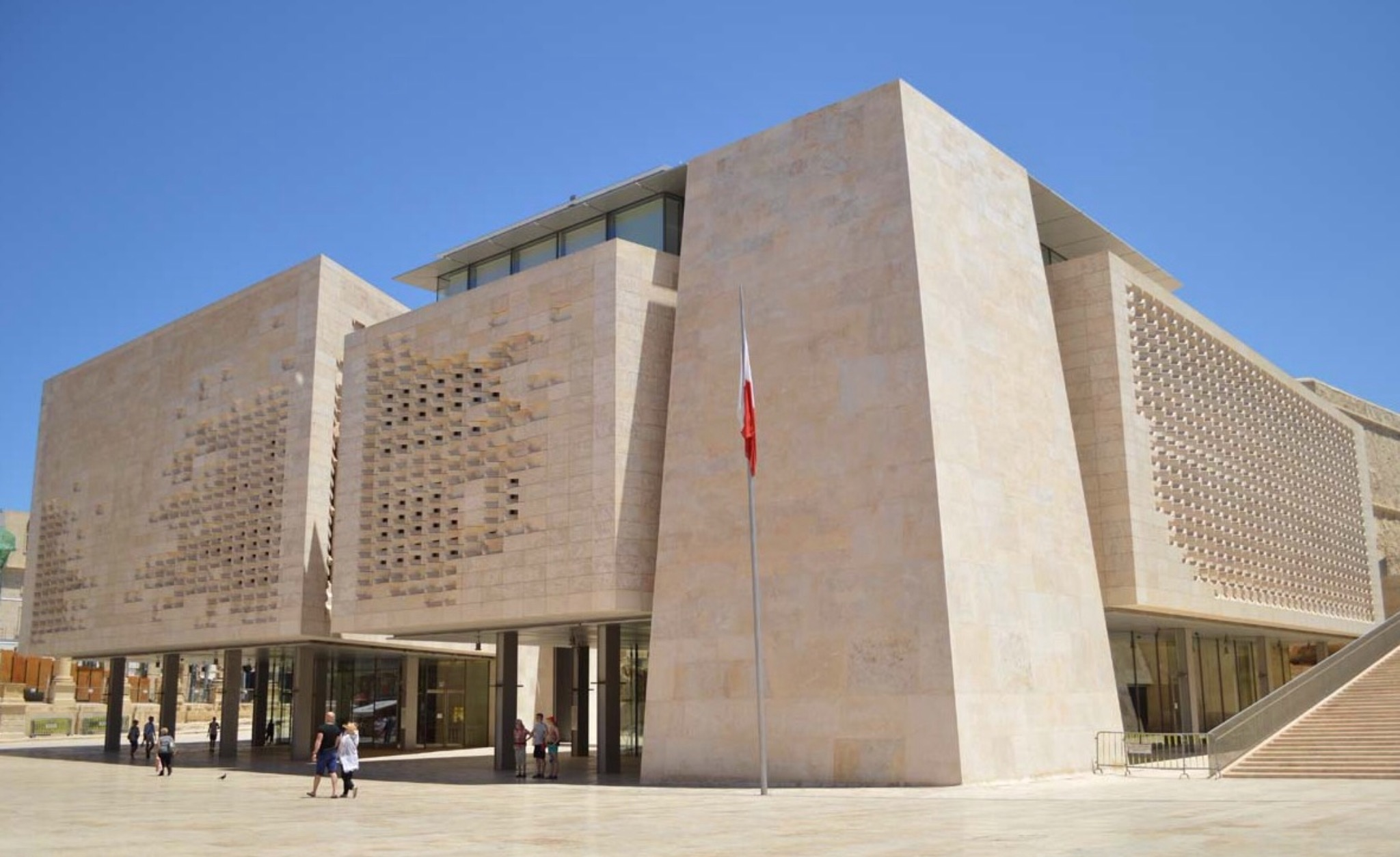
- Parliament House, Valletta

Website
- http://www.parlament.mt/

The Parliament of Malta (Maltese: Il-Parlament ta' Malta) is the constitutional legislative body in Malta, located in Valletta. The parliament is unicameral, with a democratically elected House of Representatives and the president of Malta. By constitutional law, all government ministers, including the prime minister, must be members of the House of Representatives.

Between 1921 and 1933 the Parliament was bicameral, consisting of a Senate (Senat) as well as a Legislative Assembly (Assemblea Leġiżlattiva).

== House of Representatives of Malta ==
The House of Representatives (Maltese: Kamra tad-Deputati) is the unicameral legislature of Malta and a component of the Parliament of Malta. The House is presided over by the Speaker of the House. The President of Malta is appointed for a five-year term by a resolution of the House.

=== Composition ===
The House is composed of an odd number of members elected for one legislative term of five years. Five members are returned from each of thirteen electoral districts using the single transferable vote electoral system, but additional members are elected in cases of dis-proportionality. Since 2022, 12 extra seats are provided to female candidates, as long as they fail to make up 40% of the elected members, leading to a total of 79 MPs after the 2022 election.

=== Electoral system ===
MPs are elected from 13 five-seat constituencies by single transferable vote. Candidates who pass the Hagenbach-Bischoff quota in the first round are elected, and any surplus votes transferred to the remaining candidates, who will be elected if this enables them to pass the quota. The lowest ranked candidates are then eliminated one-by-one with their preferences transferred to other candidates, who are elected as they pass the quotient, until all five seats are filled. If a party wins a majority of first preference votes but fails to achieve a parliamentary majority, they are awarded seats to ensure a one-seat majority, if they are one of only two parties to obtain seats. Malta has a stable two-party system, with only the Labour Party and Nationalist Party having a realistic chance of forming a government.

In 2018, the national voting age was lowered to 16. In 2021, a gender-corrective mechanism was introduced, with the new Article 52(A) of the Constitution providing for up to 12 additional seats for unelected candidates from "the under-represented sex" in case one of both makes up less than 40% of the elected MPs. As women have never made up more than ~15% of the elected candidates prior to this mechanism, this effectively leads to 12 extra women (6 from each party) in parliament.

=== Meeting place ===
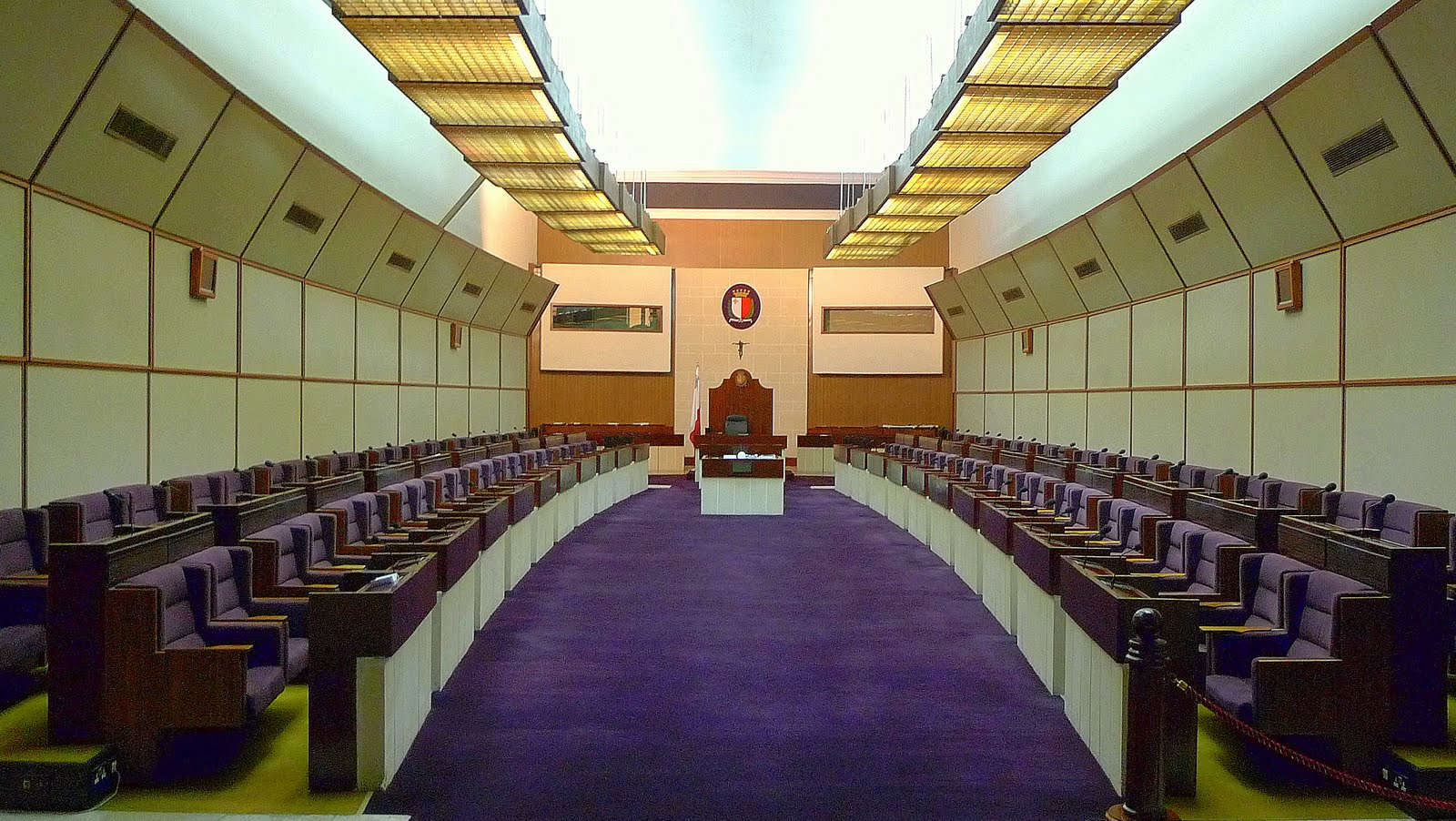
The former Parliament chamber built in 1976 at the Palace Armoury, pictured in 2010

Between 1921 and 2015, the House of Representatives was housed in the Grandmaster's Palace in Valletta. Since 4 May 2015 the House of Representatives has met in the Parliament House, near the city gate of Valletta.

=== Committees ===
The Standing Orders of the House provide for the creation of eight Parliamentary Standing Committees to make parliamentary work more efficient and enhance Parliament's scrutiny functions.

The Standing Committees are:

- Standing Committee on House Business
- Standing Committee on Privileges
- Standing Committee on Public Accounts
- Standing Committee on Foreign and European Affairs
- Standing Committee on Social Affairs
- Standing Committee on Consideration of Bills
- Standing Committee on Family Affairs
- Standing Committee on Economic and Financial Affairs

Other Standing Committees constituted by other statutes include:

- Standing Committee on Environment and Development Planning
- National Audit Office Accounts Committee
- Standing Committee for Public Appointments
- Committee for Standards in Public Life

There are also select committees and non-official committees.

== Members ==
- List of members of the parliament of Malta, 2008–2013
- List of members of the parliament of Malta, 2013–2017
- List of members of the parliament of Malta, 2017–2022
- List of members of the parliament of Malta, 2022–2026
- List of members of the parliament of Malta, 2026–2031
