= Speaker of the House of Representatives of Malta =

Presiding office of house of representative of malta

Speaker of the House of Representatives of Malta Speaker tal-Kamra tad-Deputati ta' Malta
- Coat of Arms of the Republic of Malta

- Incumbent; Carmelo Abela since 20 June 2026
- Style: Mr./Mrs. Speaker
- Appointer: House of Representatives
- Term length: One Legislature
- Inaugural holder: Edgar Arrigo
- Formation: October 1921
- Deputy: Deputy Speaker
- Salary: €42,232 annually
- Website: https://parlament.mt/en/15th-leg/political-groups/speaker-abela-carmelo/

The Speaker of the House of Representatives of Malta (Maltese: Speaker tal-Kamra tad-Deputati ta' Malta) is the presiding officer of the House of Representatives of Malta. The Speaker is responsible for controlling the flow of House business and acts as "referee" during debates. It is the Speaker's duty to ensure that the rules of the House for conducting its business are followed and that all Members of the House have an opportunity to take part in debates. Balancing the right of the majority to conduct business with the right of the minority to be heard is one of the Speaker's most difficult tasks. Because it is essential that the Speaker be seen to be above party politics, he/she does not take part in debate or vote, unless there is a tie. When there is a tie, the casting vote is conventionally used in a way to promote further discussion in the house rather than ending the debate. All remarks made in the House must be addressed to the Speaker, and no Members may stand when the Speaker is standing.

== Qualification ==
The Speaker can either be appointed from within the House or from outside the House. Speakers who are not members of the House must be qualified to serve as a member of the House of Representatives of Malta. Speakers appointed from one of the members of the House lose the ability to vote within the House.

== See also ==
- List of speakers of the House of Representatives of Malta
