= Prime Minister of Malta =

Head of government

Prime Minister of Malta Prim Ministru ta' Malta (Maltese)
- Coat of arms of the Republic of Malta

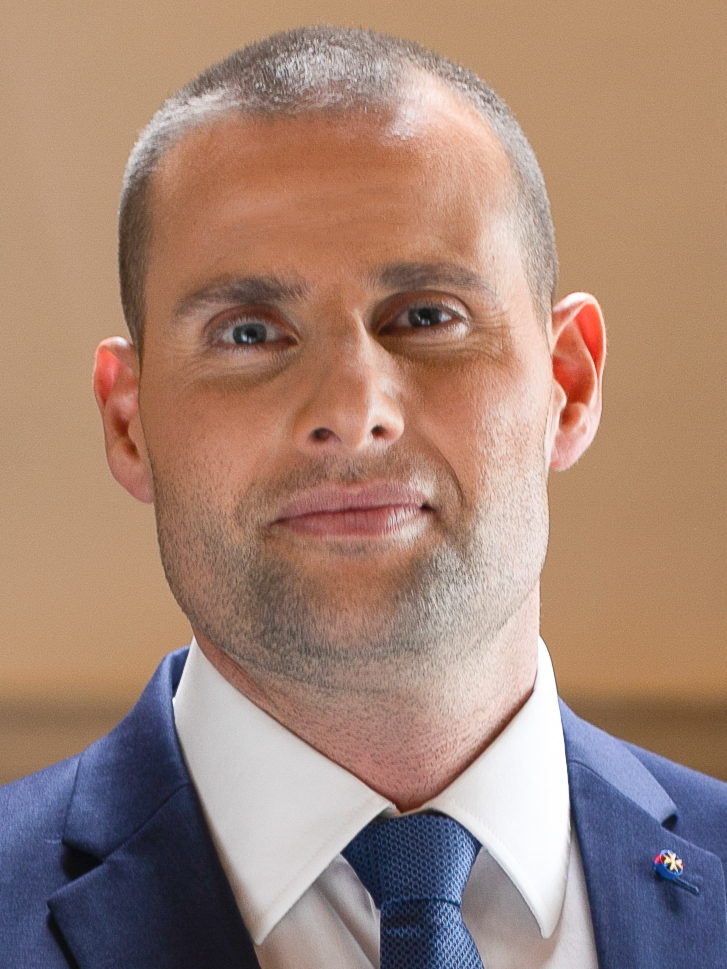
- Incumbent; Robert Abela since 13 January 2020
- Style: The Honourable (formal); His Excellency (diplomatic)
- Type: Head of government
- Member of: Cabinet of Malta; European Council
- Residence: Villa Francia (primary); Girgenti Palace (summer)
- Appointer: President of Malta
- Term length: 5 years, no direct term limit
- Inaugural holder: Joseph Howard
- Formation: 1921
- Deputy: Deputy Prime Minister
- Salary: €50,276 annually
- Website: http://opm.gov.mt/

The prime minister of Malta (Maltese: Prim Ministru ta' Malta) is the head of government, which is the highest official of Malta. The prime minister chairs Cabinet meetings, and selects its ministers to serve in their respective portfolios. The prime minister holds office by their ability to command the confidence of the Parliament, as such they sit as members of Parliament.

The prime minister is appointed by the president, in doing so, the president believes that the appointed individual is the most able to command the majority of the House of Representatives; typically, this individual is the leader of a political party or coalition of parties that hold the largest number of seats in the House of Representatives.

The prime minister is ex officio an appointee to the grade of Companion of Honour - K.U.O.M. (Kumpanju tal-Unur) of the National Order of Merit.

== Establishment of the office and developments ==
The office of "Head of Ministry" was created as soon as the Colony of Malta was granted autonomous government in 1921. The 1921 constitution was suspended twice before being revoked. On the first occasion (1930–33), the Head of Ministry (at the time, Lord Strickland) and his cabinet were retained. Following the second suspension in 1934, the cabinet was dismissed.

The constitution was revoked in 1936 and the post did not exist for as long as Malta was under direct colonial administration. The office was re-established with the grant of self-government in 1947 with the post being renamed "Prime Minister of Malta". The post was again suppressed when the 1947 constitution was again suspended, between 1958 and 1962, but was retained largely unchanged in the 1964 independence constitution and the subsequent amendments of 1974 which transformed the form of government into a republic.

== Assumption of office ==
Before assuming office the nominee must take the oath of office before the President of Malta.

The oath reads: I, (name of the nominee), solemnly swear/affirm that I will faithfully execute the office of Prime Minister (perform the functions of the Prime Minister) of Malta, and will, to the best of my ability preserve, protect and defend the Constitution of Malta. (So help me God).

== Constitutional functions ==
The president of Malta, who nominally heads the executive branch, appoints as prime minister the member of parliament who, in the opinion of the president, is best able to command a majority of the members of the House of Representatives. The prime minister advises the president on the appointment of the other ministers.

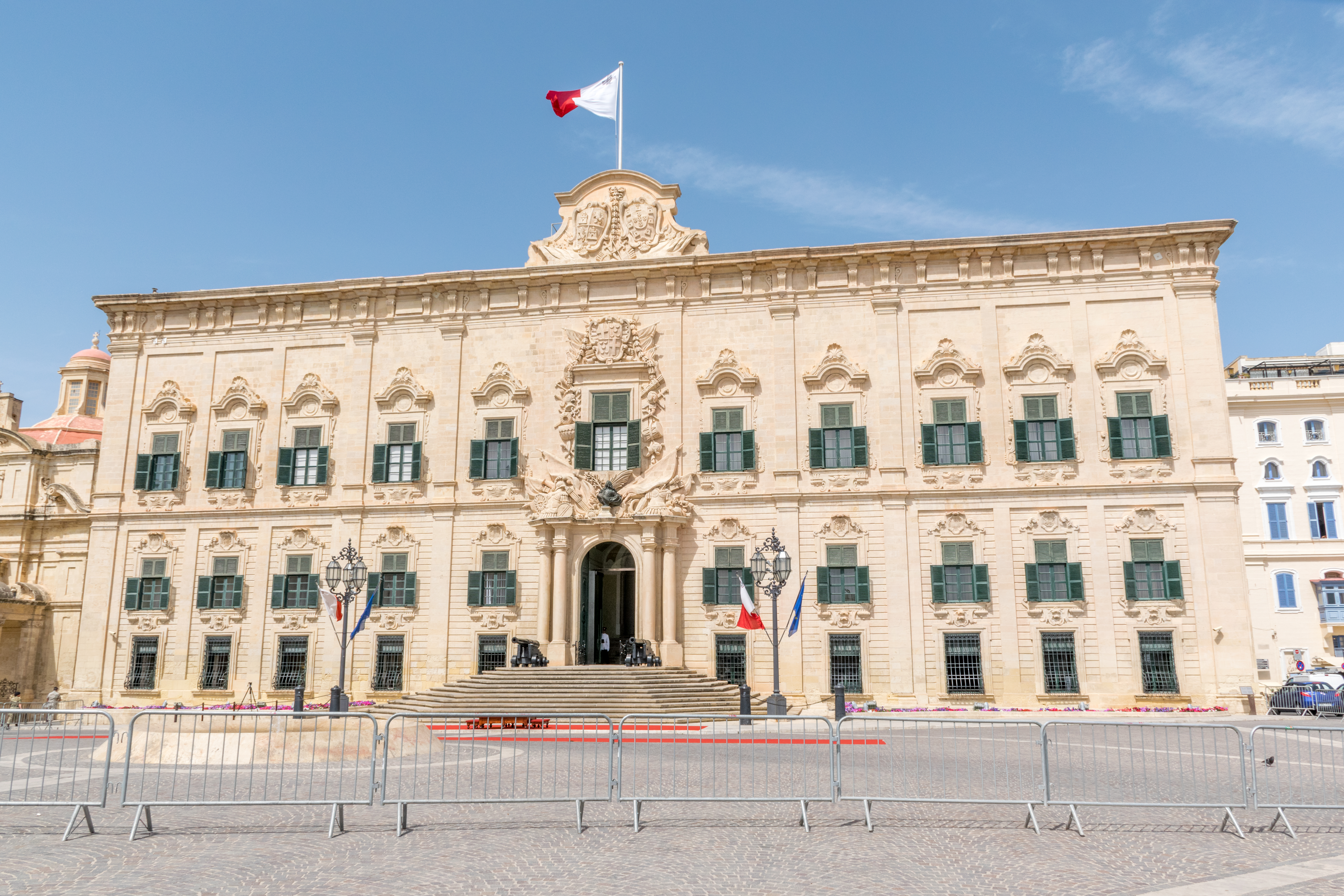
Auberge de Castille, the Office of the Prime Minister

The prime minister is constitutionally obliged to keep the president fully informed on the general conduct of the government. Whenever the prime minister is away from Malta, the president may authorise any other member of the Cabinet to perform those functions and that member may perform those functions temporarily. It is usually the deputy prime minister who fills in this role as acting prime minister.

== Office of the Prime Minister of Malta (OPM) ==
As minister in his own right, the prime minister is responsible for many departments of government. The Office of the Prime Minister (OPM) has been based at the Auberge de Castille in Valletta since 1972, playing a central role in decision-making apart from being the administrative headquarters of the government.

The OPM's mission is to support the prime minister in providing leadership and direction for a stable and effective government. The core departments of OPM include the Cabinet Secretariat, the Management and Personnel Office and the Department of Information.

== Official residences ==
Villa Francia, situated in the village of Lija is the official residence of the prime minister, while the Girgenti Palace, situated in Siġġiewi is the prime minister's summer residence. They are predominantly used for public ceremonies, including receiving notable people, and are considered symbolic buildings.

== List of prime ministers ==
As of 2022, there have been fourteen prime ministers of Malta, four of which are still living.

== See also ==
- List of prime ministers of Malta
- President of Malta
- Government of Malta
- House of Representatives of Malta
- Cabinet of Malta
