= President of Malta =

Head of state

President of Malta President ta' Malta
- Coat of arms of the Republic of Malta

- Presidential standard

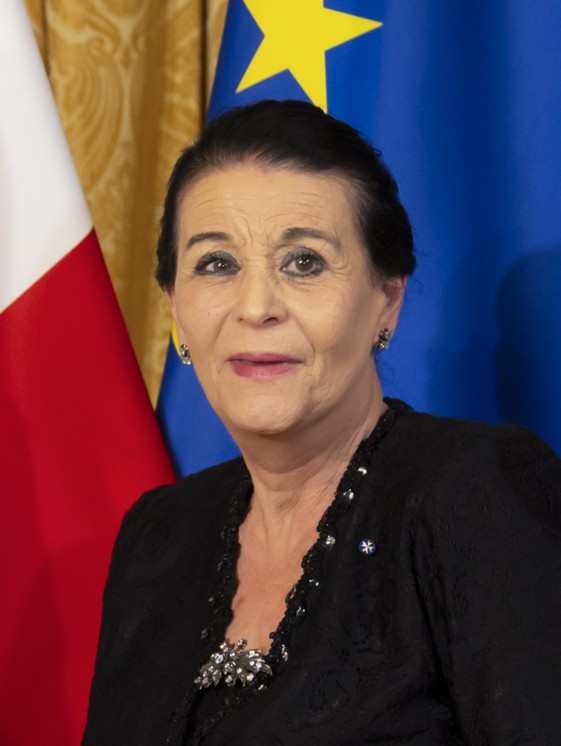
- Incumbent; Myriam Spiteri Debono since 4 April 2024
- Style: Her Excellency
- Residence: San Anton Palace
- Appointer: House of Representatives
- Term length: Five years non-renewable
- Constituting instrument: Constitution of Malta (1964)
- Inaugural holder: Sir Anthony Mamo
- Formation: 13 December 1974; 51 years ago
- Succession: Line of succession
- Salary: €88.218 annually
- Website: https://president.gov.mt/

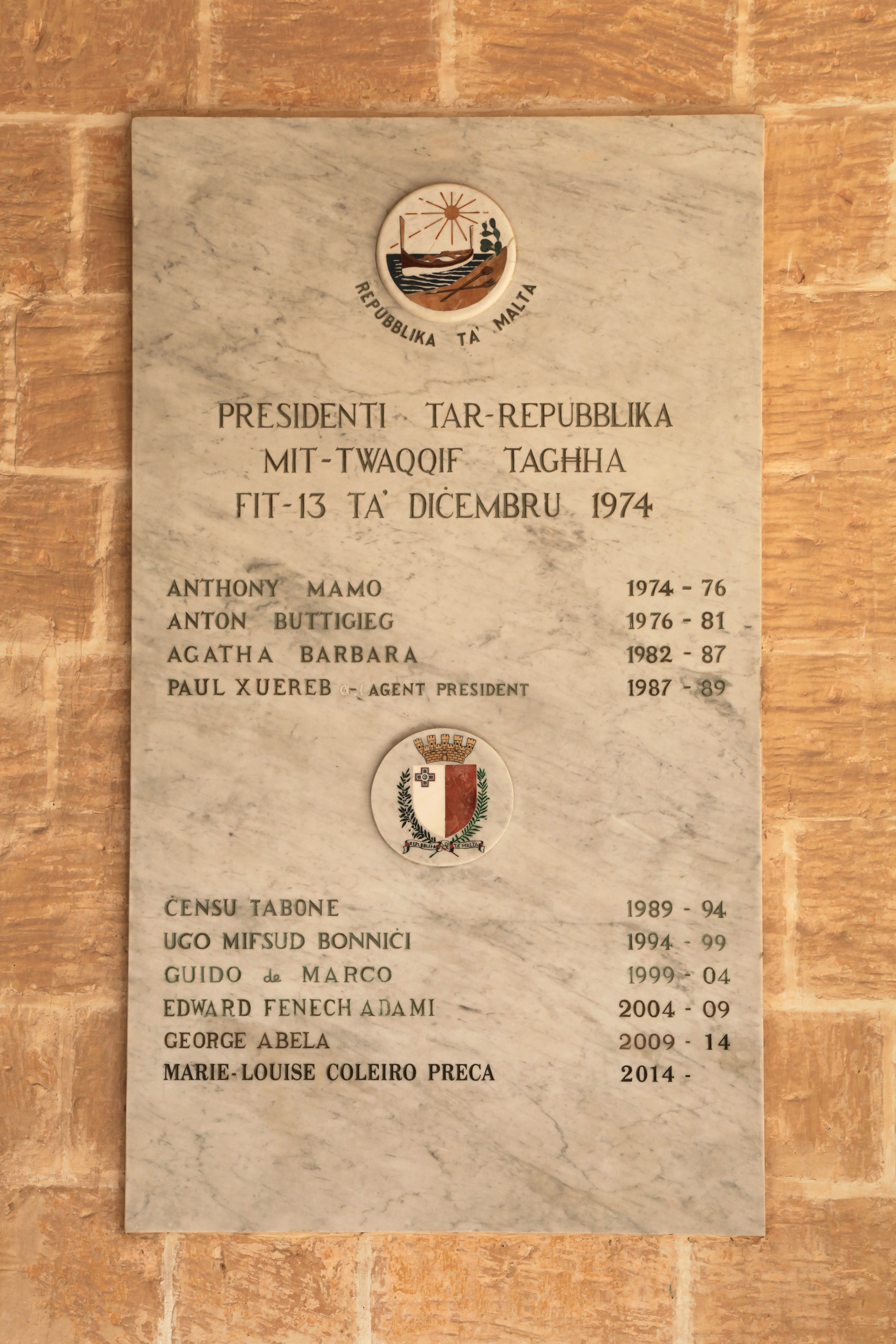
List of presidents of Malta at San Anton Palace seen in 2014

The president of Malta (Maltese: President ta' Malta) is the constitutional head of state of Malta. The president is indirectly elected by the House of Representatives of Malta, which appoints the president for a five-year term and requires them to swear an oath to "preserve, protect and defend" the Constitution. The president of Malta also presides directly or indirectly over all three branches of the state. They are part of Parliament and responsible for the appointment of members of the judiciary. Executive authority is nominally vested in the president, but is in practice exercised by the prime minister.

== Establishment of office ==
The office of the president of Malta (Maltese: President ta' Malta) came into being on 13 December 1974, when Malta became a republic within the Commonwealth of Nations. Queen Elizabeth II ceased to be head of state and Queen of Malta (Maltese: Reġina ta' Malta), and the last governor-general, Sir Anthony Mamo, became the first president of Malta.

== Qualifications ==
A person shall not be qualified to be appointed president if:

- they are not a citizen of Malta;
- they hold or have held the office of Chief Justice or any other judge of the Superior Courts;
- they are not eligible for appointment to, or to act in, any public office under Articles 109, 118 and 120 of the Constitution.

== Assumption of office ==
Before assuming office, the nominee must take the oath of office before the House of Representatives of Malta.

The oath reads: “I, (name of the nominee), solemnly swear/affirm that I will faithfully execute the office of President (perform the functions of the President) of Malta, and will, to the best of my ability, preserve, protect and defend the Constitution of Malta. (So help me God)."

== Temporary vacancy ==
Whenever the holder of the office is absent from Malta, on leave, or for any reason unable to perform the functions conferred upon them by the Constitution, those functions are performed by an individual appointed by the prime minister, after consultation with the leader of the opposition. If no such individual has been appointed, the speaker of the House of Representatives performs the duties of the president.

Notwithstanding the above, upon the expiration of five years from the date of appointment to the office of President, the office does not become automatically vacant. The Constitution states that, until a resolution supported by a two-thirds majority is achieved in the House of Representatives, the person occupying the office of President of Malta shall, in any circumstances, remain in office until such a resolution is passed. In the absence of an anti-deadlock provision, it remains to be seen how this will be applied in practice.

== Role of the president ==
The powers of the president include:

- The president promulgates laws.
- The president may dissolve the House of Representatives acting on the request of the prime minister or following the passage of a no-confidence motion in the Government.
- The president appoints the prime minister, making the decision based on the composition of the House of Representatives.
- The president appoints most members of constitutional bodies (with the assent of the prime minister).
- The president receives foreign ambassadors.
- The president may grant pardons (but not amnesties) to convicted persons and may lessen or remit sentences, acting on the advice of the Cabinet or a delegated minister.
- The president is ex officio chairman of the Commission for the Administration of Justice of Malta.
- The president is ex officio head of the Maltese honours.
- The president is ex officio chairman of the Malta Community Chest Fund, a charitable non-governmental institution aimed to help philanthropic institutions and individuals. The president's spouse is the deputy chairperson.
- The president authorises recognition in Malta of honours, awards and decorations. No title of nobility, honour, award, decoration, membership or office may be used in Malta unless it is authorised by the president. The names of those persons so authorized are published in the Government Gazette.

The role of the president is further detailed in Il-Manwal tal-President tar-Repubblika, a Maltese-language publication written by former president Ugo Mifsud Bonnici.

== Official residences ==
The official office of the president is the Grandmaster's Palace in Valletta. Other presidential residences include:

- San Anton Palace at Attard – official residence and de facto official office.
- Verdala Palace at Buskett – summer residence.

== Presidential standard ==
Presidents of Malta used the national flag as their standard before 12 December 1988, when a proclamation established the presidential standard of Malta. The flag is flown at the president’s official residences and offices, and on all occasions at which they are present.

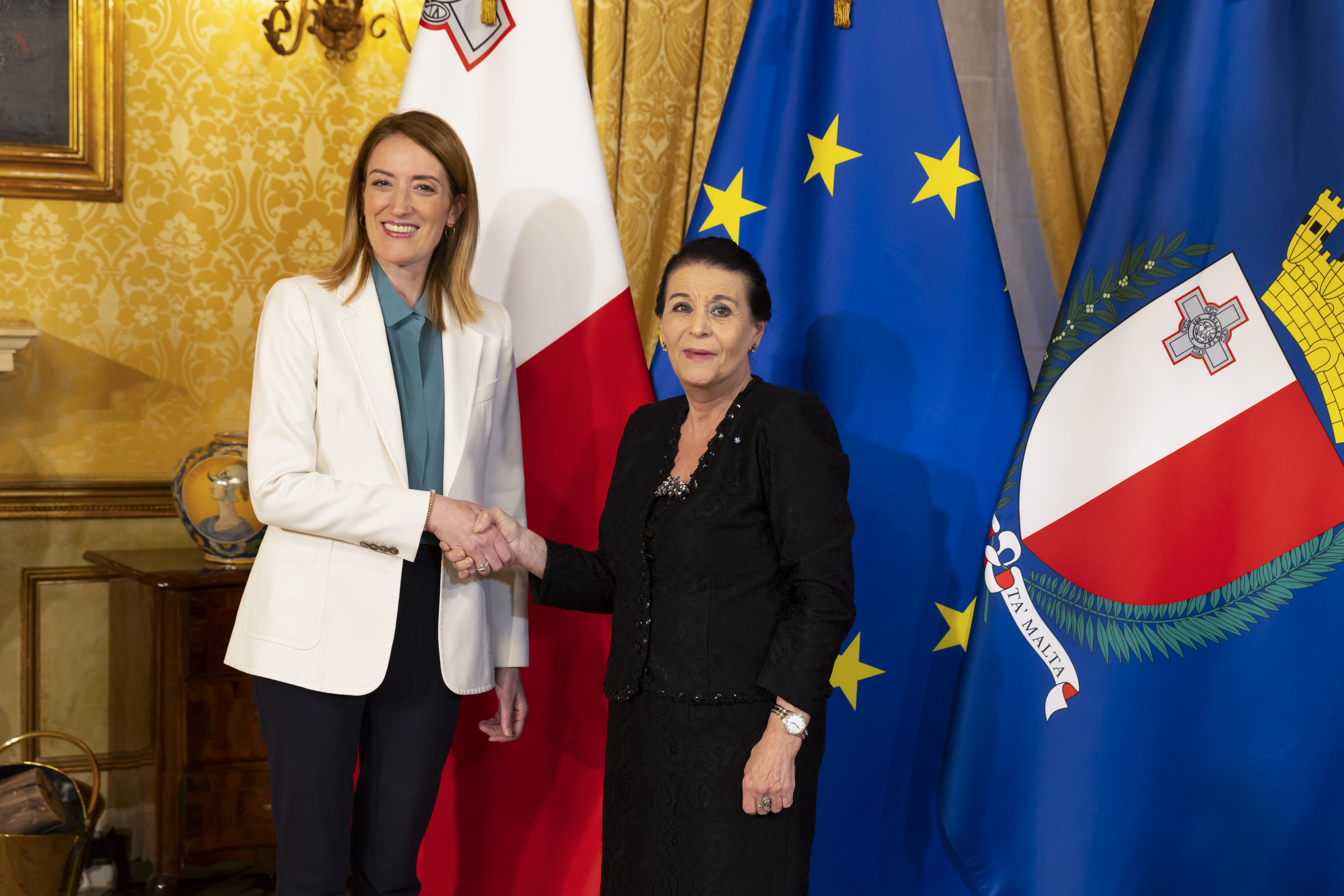
Roberta Metsola and President Myriam Spiteri Debono meeting on 20 April 2024, with the flags of Malta, the European Union, and the presidential standard in the background.

== Termination of appointment ==
The office of president shall become vacant:

- If the president resigns his/her office;
- On the expiration of five years from the date of the appointment to that office;
- If the holder of the office is removed from office by Resolution of not less than two-thirds of the House of Representatives of Malta on the ground of inability to perform the functions of their office (whether arising from infirmity of body or mind or any other cause) or misbehaviour;
- If the president dies in office.

== The veto anomaly ==
The Constitution of Malta does not accord any legislative veto powers to the president. It provides that when a bill is presented to the president for assent, he shall, without delay, signify that he assents. The Constitution therefore ensures that the legislative programme of a democratically elected Government of Malta is not constrained by a president without a democratic mandate. Constitutional law distinguishes between the office and the individual office-holder, requiring the latter to set aside their personal opinions in the exercise of the duties of president.

In practice, however, sitting presidents have at times deviated from this convention, and have on occasion threatened to resign if presented with certain bills for assent that run contrary to their personal views, or have privately lobbied for changes. Furthermore, given that an incumbent Government of Malta without a two-thirds majority in Parliament would be unable to remove the president if he refused to signify assent to a bill, the president may, in practice, be afforded a legislative veto. This would constitute a constitutional crisis, as a president without a democratic mandate would effectively exercise greater political power than the democratically mandated Government of Malta. It is unclear whether such an anomaly would be subject to judicial review by the courts of constitutional jurisdiction in Malta, both because of the immunities of the president and because of the judiciary’s relationship to the sitting government in such a matter.

== See also ==
- Prime Minister of Malta
