= LGBTQ rights in Malta =

- Location of Malta (dark green) – in Europe (light green & dark grey) – in the European Union (light green) – [Legend]
- Legal status: Legal since 29 January 1973
- Gender identity: Transgender people can change gender with or without surgery
- Military: LGBT people allowed to serve openly
- Discrimination protections: Sexual orientation, gender identity, gender expression and sex characteristics protections

Family rights
- Recognition of relationships: Civil unions since 2014; Same-sex marriage since 2017
- Adoption: Full adoption rights since 2014

Lesbian, gay, bisexual, transgender, and queer (LGBTQ) rights in Malta rank among the highest in the world. Throughout the late 20th and early 21st centuries, the rights of the LGBTQ community received more awareness and same-sex sexual activity was legalized on 29 January 1973. The prohibition was already dormant by the 1890s.

According to the Overseas Security Advisory Council (OSAC), Malta has been recognised for providing a high degree of liberty to its LGBT citizens. Since October 2015, ILGA-Europe has ranked Malta first in terms of LGBT rights legislation out of 49 observed European countries, a ranking it has upheld ever since, as of 2025. Malta is one of the few countries in the world to have made LGBT rights equal at a constitutional level. In 2016, Malta became the first country in the European Union to ban conversion therapy. In late 2020, Malta joined the UN LGBTI Core Group, an international platform for the protection of LGBT people from violence and discrimination.

Out magazine has declared Malta as being among the best European countries in terms of LGBT rights. According to the United States Department of State, Malta is a safe environment for foreign LGBT travellers, and according to the LGBT+ Danger Index Malta is the tenth safest country in the world for LGBT people. French agency Expert Market ranks Malta as the seventh best European destination for foreign LGBT workers. A 2019 opinion poll from the Eurobarometer series indicated that 67% of Maltese supported same-sex marriage, a significant increase over a decade, and 73% believed gay, lesbian and bisexual people should enjoy the same rights as heterosexual people.

Discrimination on the basis of sexual orientation and gender identity and expression has been banned nationwide since 2004. Gay, lesbian, bisexual, and transgender people have been allowed to serve openly in the military since 2002. Transgender and intersex rights in Malta are of the highest standard in the world under the Gender Identity, Gender Expression And Sex Characteristics Act, which permits transgender people to change their legal gender without medical interventions and bans surgeries on intersex infants. Same-sex marriage has been legal since 1 September 2017, and prior to that civil unions (Note: Civil unions are equal to marriage in all but name, with the same rights and obligations including adoption rights.) were enacted in April 2014.

== LGBT history in Malta ==
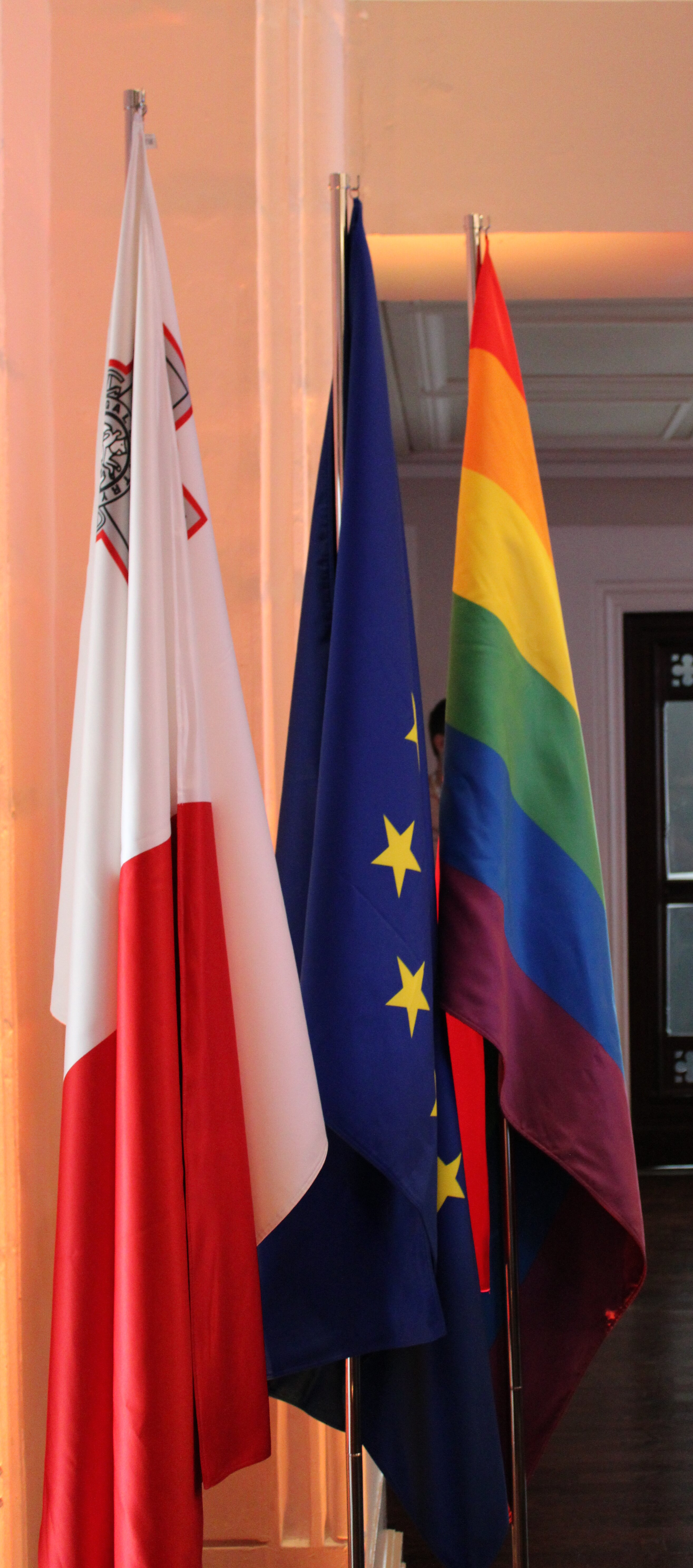
Maltese, European and rainbow flag

=== Order of St. John ===
During the rule of the Order of St John, sodomy was considered a common enough occurrence among members of the Military Order in Malta, but was associated with Italians or Muslims. It was also common preference for men attracted to men (including knights who had taken vows of celibacy) to look for sex with younger looking men, effeminate men, or to be drawn towards pederasty.

However, conditions hardened into the 17th century as the reforms of the Catholic Counter Reformation rippled out, and there was an increase in prejudice and laws against those involved in homosexual behaviour. The Scottish voyager and author William Lithgow, writing in 1616, reported that a Spanish soldier and a Maltese teenage boy were publicly "burnt to ashes" for confessing to have had sex together. As a consequence, and for fear of a similar outcome, it was reported that at least a hundred men (possibly involved in prostitution) subsequently fled to Sicily the following day. Buttigieg argues that this indicated that while homosexuality was taboo, it was nevertheless widespread enough and discretely tolerated.

An uncommon case, heard at the Castellania in 1774, involved an intersex person, 17-year-old Rosa Mifsud from Luqa, who petitioned for a sex change by dressing as a man. Two medical experts were appointed by the court to perform an examination. - the physician-in-chief and a senior surgeon, both working at the Sacra Infermeria. Mifsud had petitioned the Grandmaster to be recognized as a male, and it was the Grandmaster himself who took the final decision for Mifsud to wear only men's clothes from then on.

=== British period ===
As a British colony, Malta adopted the Penal Code of Great Britain which criminalised homosexual relations between men. There are examples of individuals caught out by the law, and include a lawyer, Guglielmo Rapinett, who was elected to the Council of Government and served as Professor of Law at the University of Malta. In 1884 he was arrested for "lewd behaviour" while allegedly trying to seduce a British soldier. Nevertheless, the Bishop of Malta personally petitioned for his release.

The politician Joseph Flores, who served during the 1950s as Deputy Leader for the Maltese Labour Party, was thought to have had a relationship with the author Herbert Ganado during their study at university in the 1920s, and they were reportedly fond of dressing in drag.

Homosexuality in the military was considered to be a "serious crime". Those in the military who were under investigation for homosexuality would be dismissed with immediate effect and prosecuted by a court-martial. An especially prominent case was that of the British Sub-Lieutenant, Christopher Swabey, who was court-martialed and dismissed from post in 1956; although this was later over-turned by the House of Lords.

Because gay relationships lacked official recognition, gay men sometimes had to be pragmatic to ensure some legal or inheritance rights. For example, John Baptist Francia (1893–1974) legally adopted William Nathaniel Fenton in 1960 (Fenton was thirty years younger). The romantic relationship between the two men was a relatively open secret. In 1971 legislation was passed that permitted Fenton to inherit Baptist's Villa Francia estate in Lija upon his death. During their time together the two organized gay social events and parties at the villa. At Fenton's death the Villa passed to the State and is today the official residence for the Prime Minister of Malta.

=== Independent Malta ===
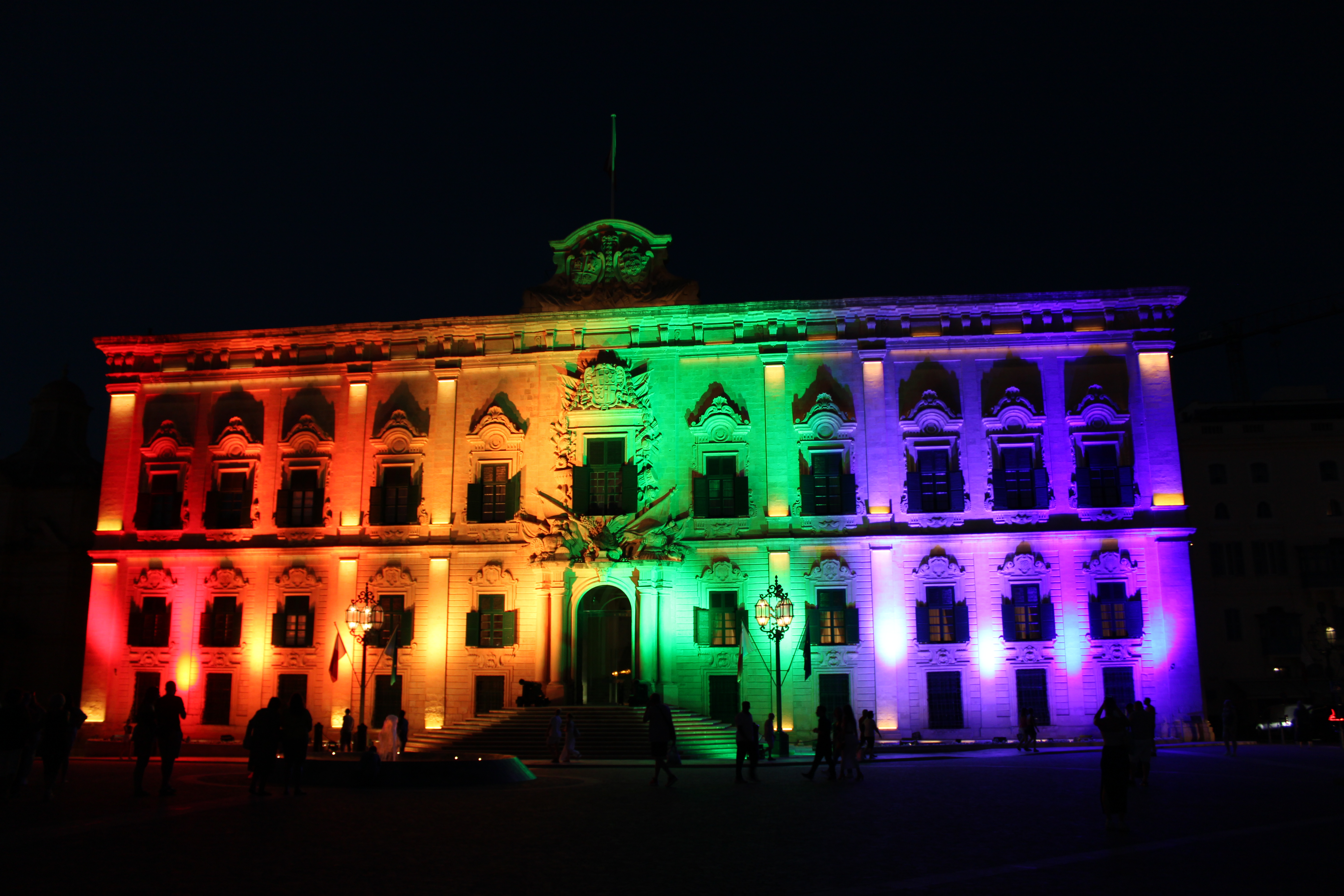
The Auberge de Castille, home to the Office of the Prime Minister of Malta, lit in rainbow colours during Europride 2023

Malta became independent in 1964 and at this point Malta was comparably still traditional in terms of the sexual revolution and progression in Europe. Only in 1973 did the Labour Government decide to change Malta's laws to match those of Western Europe and decriminalise homosexuality.

MGRM, formerly known as the Malta Gay Rights Movement (Moviment għad-Drittijiet tal-Omosesswali f'Malta), is a socio-political non-governmental organisation founded in 2001 to focus on the challenges and rights of the Maltese LGBT community. In February 2008, MGRM organised and presented a petition to Parliament asking for a range of measures to be introduced to protect LGBT people through the law. The petition was signed by more than 1,000 people and asked for legal recognition of same-sex couples, an anti-homophobic bullying strategy for the island nation's schools and new laws targeting homophobic and transphobic crimes. The petition received the backing of Alternattiva Demokratika. Party chairman Harry Vassallo said that the recognition of gay rights would be a step forward.

In 2004, the Government introduced a ban on anti-gay discrimination in employment. In October 2009, George Abela, the President of Malta, met with the board of ILGA-Europe at the presidential palace as the group prepared to open its 13th annual conference in Malta. Abela agreed that information and education were important in tackling discrimination and fostering acceptance of differences and that Malta has seen progress in LGBT acceptance. He was said that "love is the most important thing there is and it can't be 'graded' based on sexual orientation". It was the first time a head of state met with ILGA-Europe members during one of the group's annual conferences.

== Legality of same-sex sexual activity ==
Same-sex sexual activity has been legal in Malta since January 1973. The Prime Minister of Malta, Dom Mintoff, and the Labour Party legislated for the removal of the British-introduced sodomy law, at the time opposed by the Roman Catholic Church in Malta and the Maltese Nationalist Party. Mikiel Gonzi, Archbishop of Malta, remained staunchly opposed to decriminalization. He complained that homosexuality was both a grave sin and "unnatural", and furthermore said it was practiced by the "sick". The age of consent is equal regardless of sexual orientation or gender at 16 years of age.

== Recognition of same-sex relationships ==
Same-sex couples in Malta have the right to marry or form a civil union. The latter provides couples with exactly the same legal rights and responsibilities as a marriage, including the right to jointly adopt children.

On 28 March 2010, Prime Minister Lawrence Gonzi announced that the Government of Malta was working on a bill to regulate cohabitation for opposite-sex and same-sex couples, hoping the bill would be completed by the end of the year. On 11 July, Gonzi confirmed that the bill would be presented in Parliament by the end of 2010. The draft bill was presented by the Minister of Justice on 28 August 2012 and was under consultation process until 30 September. The bill was introduced, but died in December 2012 due to the fall of the government and dissolution of Parliament.

Following a campaign promise during the 2013 elections, the Minister for Social Dialogue, Consumer Affairs, and Civil Liberties of the newly elected Labour Government announced that it was entering consultations for a bill granting civil unions to same-sex couples, with the bill presented in Parliament on 30 September 2013. The civil union bill, which would give same-sex couples rights equivalent to marriage, including the legal right to adopt children jointly, under the legal name civil union rather than marriage, was debated in October 2013, and approved at the third reading on 14 April 2014. President Marie-Louise Coleiro Preca signed it into law on 16 April 2014.

In March 2016, Prime Minister of Malta and leader of the governing Labour Party Joseph Muscat stated at an International Women's Day event he was personally in favour of legalising same-sex marriage in the country and that it was "time for a national debate" on the issue. Opposition Nationalist Party leader Simon Busuttil responded by stating that though Muscat was attempting to use the issue of same-sex marriage to distract from a government scandal, he could foresee no difficulty in amending Malta's civil union legislation to legalise same-sex marriage. The country's leading gay rights organisation subsequently called for a bill to be put forward opening up marriage to all couples irrespective of gender without delay.

Following the June 2017 snap elections, the Labour Government presented a bill amending Maltese marriage law to Parliament. It would give equal rights to same-sex and opposite-sex couples. The bill was introduced on 24 June and passed the Parliament on 12 July, in a 66–1 vote. The law replaced all gender-specific references in Maltese law with gender-neutral terminology. The bill was signed into law by President Marie-Louise Coleiro Preca and went into effect on 1 September 2017.

== Adoption and parenting ==
Maltese law grants adoption rights to married couples, civil partners and single persons, including single LGBT individuals. The first official adoption by a same-sex couple took place on 13 July 2016. The child had previously been turned down by over 50 couples due to the fact he has Down syndrome. By February 2018, there had been three adoptions by same-sex couples in Malta.

For an effective adoption (by a single person, couple or partner), a court ruling is required for every individual child, irrespective of the sexual orientation of any of the prospective parent or parents.

Surrogacy is presently unlawful regardless of sexual orientation. In 2014, the Maltese Government announced it had no intention to legalize surrogacy.

On 7 September 2015, Prime Minister Muscat announced that the government would introduce a bill to grant in vitro fertilisation (IVF) access to lesbian couples. On 30 June 2017, Minister of Health Chris Fearne stated that a bill to reform the Embryo Protection Act 2012 would be introduced "soon". The bill had its first reading in the Parliament on 11 April 2018. On 23 May, the bill passed its second reading, in a 36–29 vote with 2 MPs not voting. It passed the committee stage on 14 June, and on 19 June the bill passed its third reading, in a 34–27 vote with 6 MPs not present. It was signed into law by the President on 21 June 2018, and took effect on 1 October 2018.

The President's Foundation for the Wellbeing of Society has taken steps to encouraging acceptance of same-sex families within mainstream society. It promotes equal and shared values with the project Rainbow Families Network.

== Discrimination protections ==
Since 2004, Malta has had a ban on anti-gay discrimination in employment, in line with European Union requirements, but discrimination remained common to some extent until 2009 according to results through questionnaires carried with the participation of the LGBT community. Anti-discrimination protections were expanded in June 2012.

In June 2012, Parliament amended the Criminal Code to provide penalty enhancements to hate crimes motivated by the victim's sexual orientation or gender identity.

On 14 April 2014, the Parliament of Malta unanimously approved a bill which amended the Constitution to add protections from discrimination on the basis of sexual orientation and gender identity. It was signed by the President on 17 April 2014.

The Equality for Men and Women Act (Maltese: Att dwar l'Ugwaljanza għall-Irġiel u n-Nisa) defines "discrimination" as follows:

"discrimination" means discrimination based on sex or because of family responsibilities, sexual orientation, age, religion or belief, racial or ethnic origin, or gender identity, gender expression or sex characteristics and includes the treatment of a person in a less favourable manner than another person is, has been or would be treated on these grounds and "discriminate" shall be constructed accordingly

== Transgender rights ==
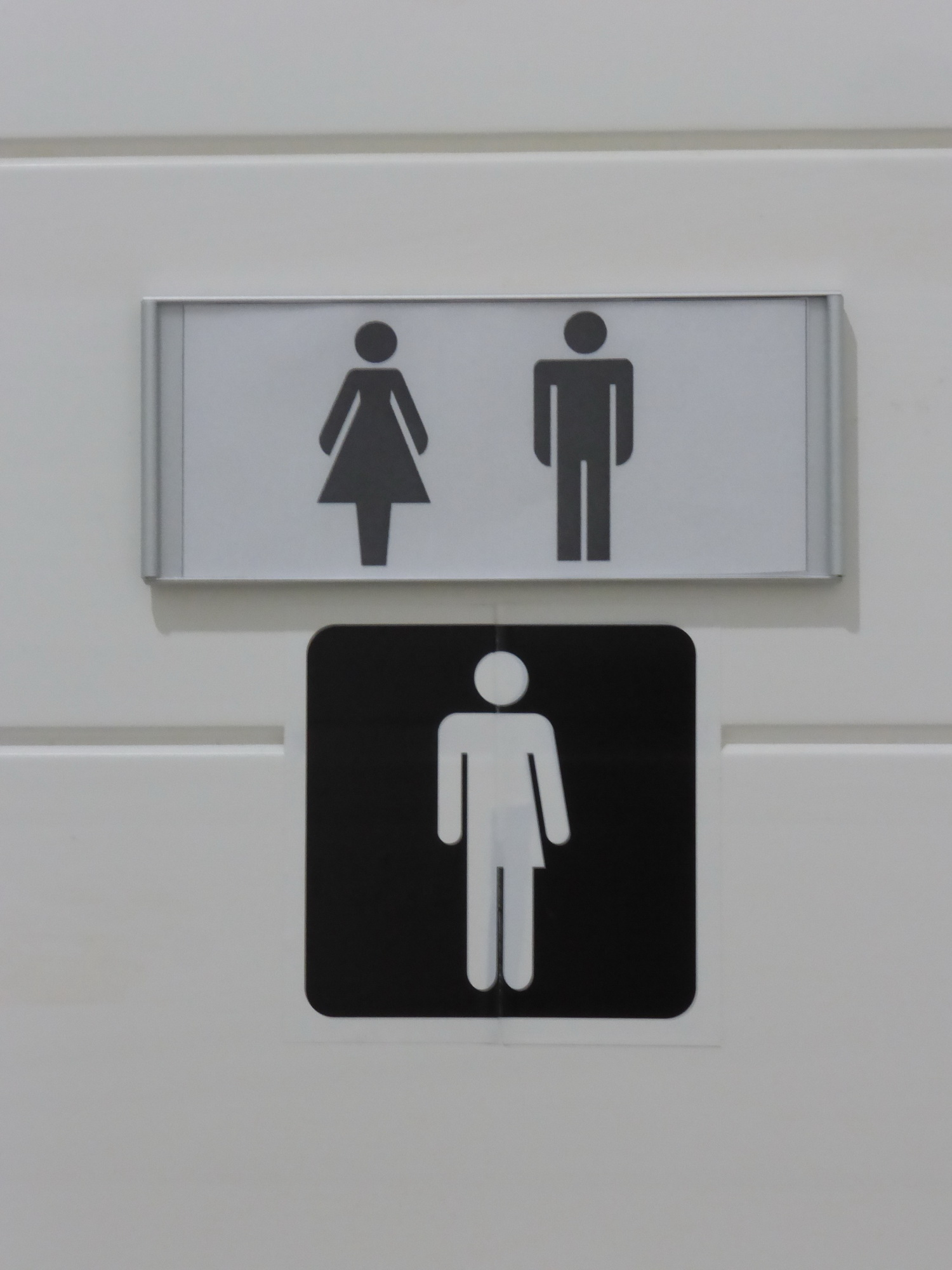
Female, male and nonbinary toilet sign at the Fortifications Interpretation Centre, Valletta

One of the first openly transgender women in Malta was Katya Saunders, who is also widely regarded as having helped pave the way for gay rights on the island. Her achievements in this area are recorded in a biography by Ramona Depares, titled Katya: Easy on the Tonic. In September 2006, Joanne Cassar, a transgender woman, was denied the right to marry her partner. In 2007, a judge in Malta ordered government officials to issue her the appropriate documentation. The Director of Public Registry successfully contested that ruling in May 2008. Cassar filed a constitutional application in the First Hall of the Civil Court charging a violation of her fundamental human rights. She won that case initially, but lost on appeal in 2011. In April 2013, she reached a settlement with the government that included financial compensation in addition to promised statutory changes. The leader of the Nationalist Party apologised for its part in contesting Cassar's right to marry.

In April 2014, Malta became the first European state to add gender identity to its Constitution as a protected category.

Applicants can change their official documents by simply filing an affidavit with a notary, eliminating any requirement for medical gender reassignment procedures under the Gender Identity, Gender Expression And Sex Characteristics Act (Maltese: Att dwar l-Identità tal-Ġeneru, l-Espressjoni tal-Ġeneru u l-Karatteristiċi tas-Sess), enacted in April 2015. In November 2015, the Minister of Home Affairs informed that 40 people had legally changed their gender since enactment of the law. In December 2016, the Act was amended to allow minors who are sixteen and over to have their gender changed without needing to file an application in court or obtain parental approval.

Sex reassignment surgery and hormone therapy are not free of charge, and are not always easily available. However, in September 2022, the prime minister of Malta made an announcement that sexual reassignment surgery will be free - but is yet to provide more details such as when the new policy would go into effect.

== Non-binary birth certificates ==
In July 2024, legislation was officially passed to implement a non-binary option alongside male and female on an individual’s birth certificate and went into effect in September 2024. Until recently a birth certificate could only list male or female within Malta.

== Intersex rights ==
In April 2015, Malta became the first country in the world to outlaw sterilisation and invasive surgery on intersex people. Applicants can also change their official documents by simply filing an affidavit with a notary without any requirement for medical gender reassignment procedures. Sanctions for intersex medical interventions were introduced in 2018, providing imprisonment not exceeding five years or a fine of between €5,000 and €20,000.

The Gender Identity, Gender Expression and Sex Characteristics Act, approved by Parliament in 2015, also prohibits discrimination on the basis of sex characteristics, thereby protecting intersex people from discrimination.

Maltese passports, identity cards, and other government-issued identification have been available with an "X" sex designation since 2017.

== Military service ==
Malta allows people to serve openly in the armed forces regardless of their sexual orientation or gender identity. According to the military, a number of openly gay people serve, and the official attitude is one of "live and let live", where "a person's postings and duties depend on their qualifications, not their sexual orientation".

== Domestic violence ==
On 25 April 2018, legislation to protect individuals from domestic violence was approved by 44 votes in favour and 20 against. The law is written in gender-neutral terms, and thus applies equally to same-sex and different-sex couples. The Act was published on 14 May 2018 by the Maltese Ministry of Justice.

== Health and blood donation ==
Primary healthcare in Malta is available freely for everyone, including LGBT people with specific protections from discrimination on the basis of sexual orientation. However, while pre-exposure prophylaxis (PrEP) and post-exposure prophylaxis (PEP) are available to purchase, they are considerably expensive to pay for. There are proposals to make them more available to avoid STDs, especially HIV/AIDS, among LGBT people and heterosexuals alike.

Gay and bisexual men in Malta can donate blood, on the condition that they have not had sex in a year. Previously, Malta enforced a complete blood donation ban on men who have sex with men. In May 2016, Minister for Health Chris Fearne announced that a technical committee set up in 2015 to review that ban had recently completed its report and recommended scrapping the current indefinite deferral on donations. The new policy would still exclude donations from men who have had sex with another man any time in the previous 12 months. In September 2016, the youth wing of the Labour Party announced their support for lifting the ban. The one-year deferral period was implemented in September 2017.

Since September 2022, gay and bi men can legally donate blood within Malta after having at most one sexual partner within the last four months, the same applied to heterosexual people.

== Conversion therapy ==
On 16 June 2015, Civil Liberties Minister Helena Dalli announced that the government planned to introduce a bill to ban conversion therapy on minors. On 15 December 2015, Dalli presented the bill for its first reading in Parliament. A public consultation on the bill was launched the same day and lasted until 15 January 2016. The bill passed its second reading and the committee stage with amendments in November 2016, by a unanimously held vote. It then moved to a third reading and was later signed by the President before going into effect. The MCP (Malta Chamber of Psychologists), the MAP (Maltese Association of Psychiatry), the MACP (Malta Association for the Counselling Profession) and the MAFT & SP (Malta Association of Family Therapy and Systemic Practice) had given their full support to the bill. The bill unanimously passed its final reading on 6 December, becoming the Affirmation of Sexual Orientation, Gender Identity and Gender Expression Act (Maltese: Att dwar l'Affermazzjoni tal-Orjentazzjoni Sesswali, l'Identità tal-Ġeneru u l'Espressjoni tal-Ġeneru). Malta thus became the first country in the European Union to prohibit the use of conversion therapy.

== Living conditions ==
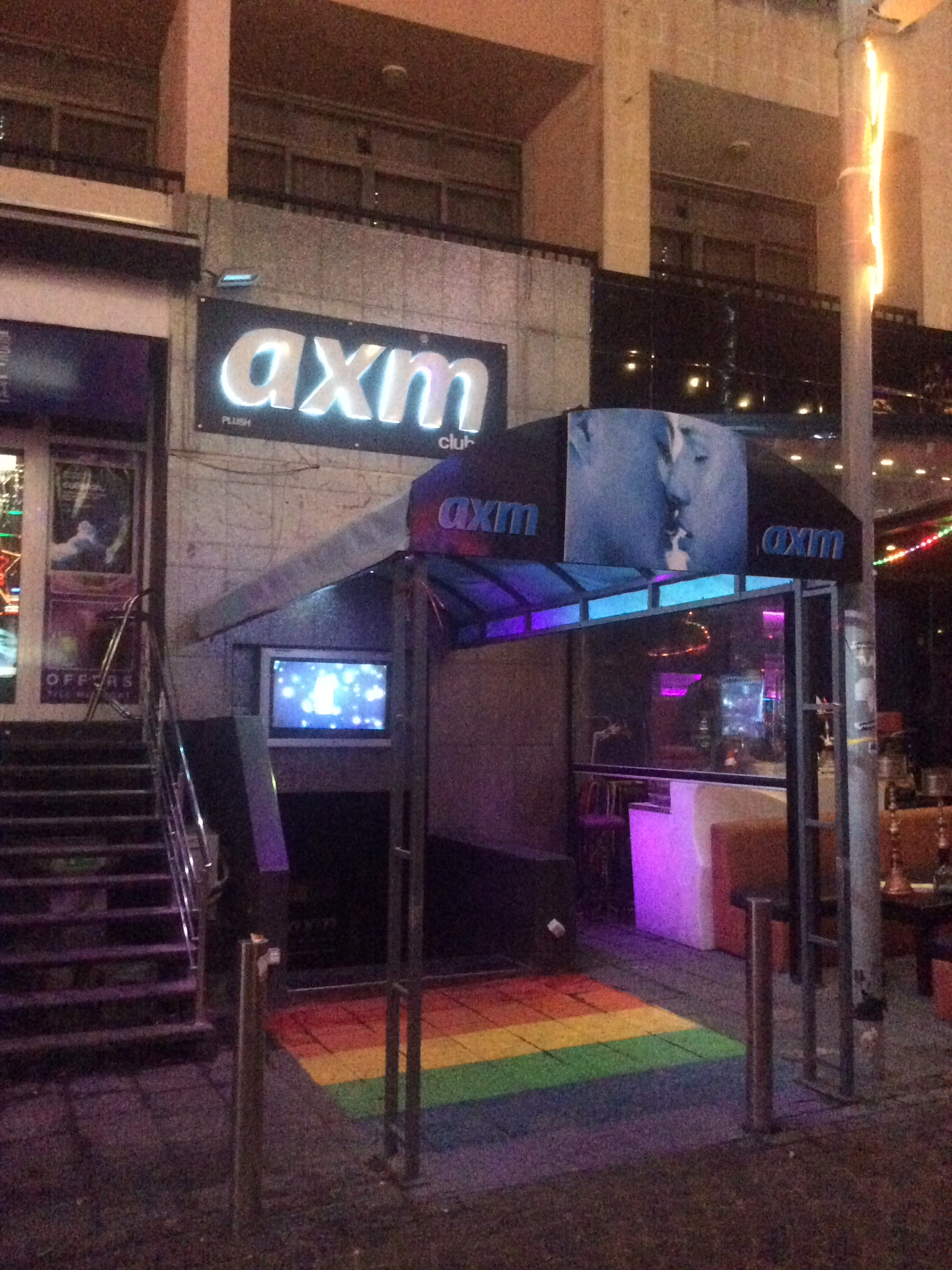
LGBT discothèque in Paceville

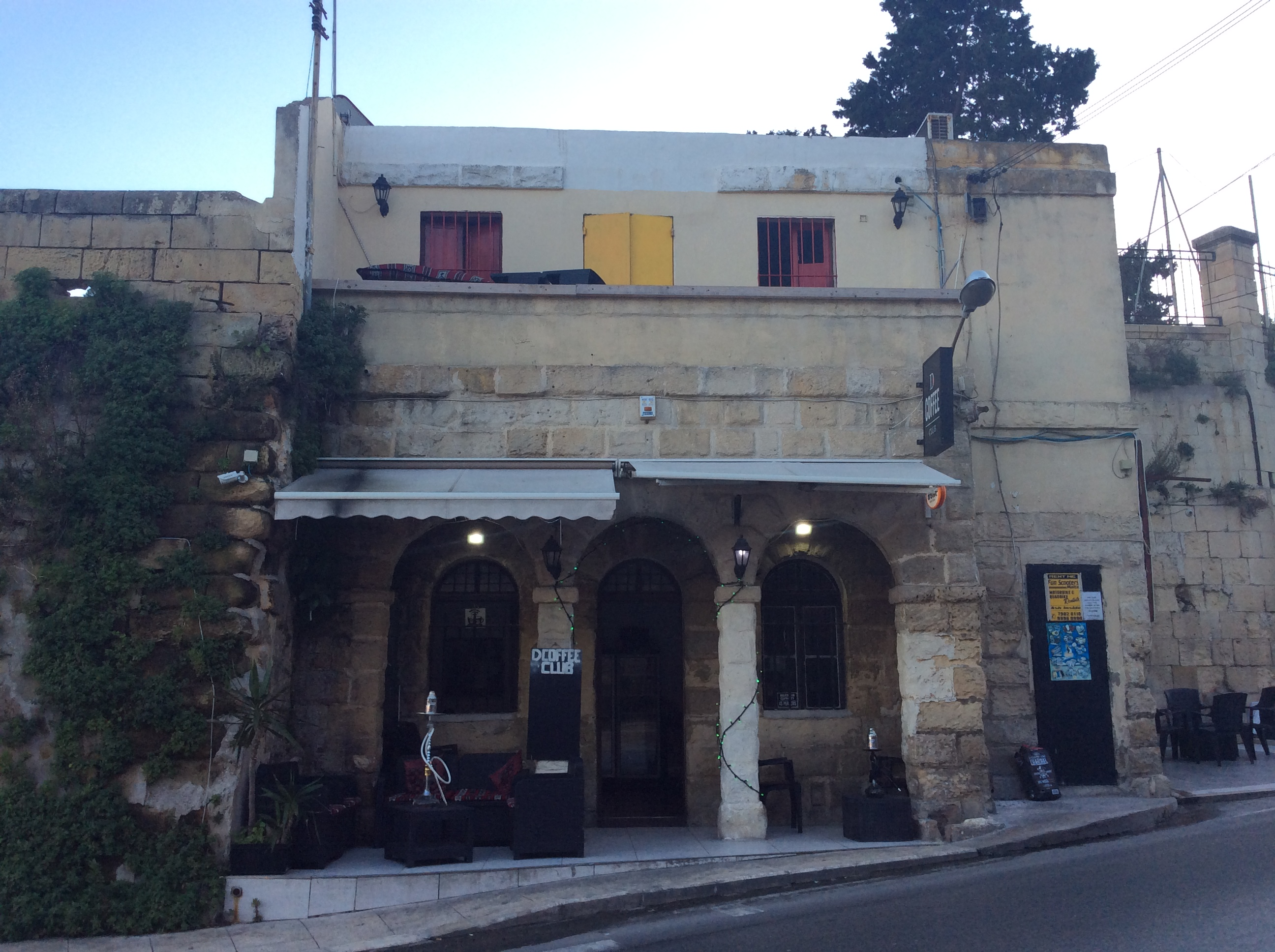
Formerly Tom's Bar

Living conditions for LGBT people have become more favourable in recent years with same-sex relationships being accepted in public, though some negative conditions remain. A 2015 EU-wide survey, commissioned by the Fundamental Rights Agency, showed that 54% of gay people in Malta felt comfortable holding their partner's hand in public, though only 40% were out at their workplaces.

Malta has an active LGBT community, with well attended annual gay pride parades in Valletta. A majority of prominent political leaders in Malta appeared at the pride parade in 2016, including Prime Minister Joseph Muscat and Opposition leader Simon Busuttil. There used to be a notable gay club in Floriana, named Tom Bar, which was the oldest in Malta. Another operating LGBT-friendly club is Monaliza in Valletta.

In July 2007, Malta's Union of Teachers threatened to publish the details of four attempts to out gay and lesbian teachers from Roman Catholic school posts. According to the union, Church schools were under pressure from parents to fire the teachers, leading to four interventions in the past five years.

In 2015, the donation of reading material by the Malta Gay Rights Movement, that contained the teaching of diverse families, including same-sex parenting, to the Education Department caused some controversy. Minister of Education Evarist Bartolo took a position not to distribute the material. In June 2021, Malta has opposed any law which prohibits the teaching and distribution of LGBT information among children at an EU conference.

== Political parties ==
The Labour Party and AD+PD are the most supportive of the LGBT community and their rights in Malta. On the other hand, the Nationalist Party is mixed on its support for LGBT causes, being influenced by the party's traditional social conservatism stance and Roman Catholicism, although most Nationalist MPs voted in favor of same-sex marriage in 2017. The minor parties, which are mostly right-wing or far-right (e.g. Alleanza Bidla, Moviment Patrijotti Maltin and Imperium Europa) are against LGBT rights.

== Public opinion ==
Polls have indicated a quick and drastic shift in public opinion on LGBT rights in Malta. The 2006 Eurobarometer survey found that 18% of the population supported same-sex marriage, whereas 73% were against (63% totally against). Adoption by same-sex couples was supported by 7% and opposed by 85% (76% totally opposed).

In June 2012, a poll commissioned by MaltaToday found that support for same-sex marriage had increased significantly, with 41% of the population in favour of same-sex marriage and 52% against it. The 2012 data also showed a generational gap, with only 23% of people older than 55 supporting the legalisation of same-sex marriage, while 60% of those aged 18–35 did so.

The 2015 Eurobarometer found a majority of 65% in favour of same-sex marriage, with 29% against. This was the largest increase in support of any country surveyed in the Eurobarometer compared to the 2006 results.

In May 2015, PlanetRomeo, an LGBT social network, published its first Gay Happiness Index (GHI). Gay men from over 120 countries were asked about how they feel about society's view on homosexuality, how do they experience the way they are treated by other people and how satisfied are they with their lives. Malta was ranked 27th with a GHI score of 61.

The 2019 Eurobarometer showed that 73% of Maltese people believed gay and bisexual people should enjoy the same rights as heterosexual people, and 67% supported same-sex marriage. Both numbers were slightly lower than the EU averages, which were 76% and 69% respectively.

A survey published in January 2020 showed that 56% of LGBT respondents felt unsafe in Paceville, known for its frequent fights and violent incidents. Many reported discrimination and harassment at the hands of bouncers, bartenders or other patrons. 14% reported the incidents were violent, and 5% required medical assistance.

The 2023 Eurobarometer found that 74% of Maltese thought same-sex marriage should be allowed throughout Europe, and 78% agreed that "there is nothing wrong in a sexual relationship between two persons of the same sex".

== Summary table ==
| Same-sex sexual activity legal | Yes (Since 1973) |
| Equal age of consent (16) | Yes (Since 1973) |
| Anti-discrimination laws in employment | Yes (Since 2004) |
| Anti-discrimination laws in the provision of goods and services | Yes / No (Some since 2014; all from 2026) |
| Anti-discrimination laws in all other areas (incl. indirect discrimination, hate speech) | Yes (Since 2014) |
| Anti-discrimination laws concerning gender identity | Yes (Since 2014) |
| Recognition of same-sex couples (e.g. civil unions) | Yes (Since 2014) |
| Same-sex marriage | Yes (Since 2017) |
| Stepchild adoption by same-sex couples | Yes (Since 2014) |
| Joint adoption by same-sex couples | Yes (Since 2014) |
| LGBT people allowed to serve openly in the military | Yes (Since 2002) |
| Right to change legal gender | Yes (Since 2015) |
| Third gender or non-binary option on government documents (i.e. a birth certificate) | Yes (Since 2024) |
| Gender self-identification | Yes |
| Intersex minors protected from invasive surgical procedures | Yes (Since 2015) |
| Automatic parenthood for both spouses after birth | Yes |
| Conversion therapy banned | Yes (Since 2016) |
| Access to IVF for lesbian couples | Yes (Since 2018) |
| Asylum protection | Yes (Since 2013) (Note: Refugee Commission oversees case by case. Proof of persecution in country of origin required.) |
| Access to surrogacy for gay male couples | No (Banned regardless of sexual orientation) |
| MSMs allowed to donate blood | Yes (Since 2022) |

== See also ==
- Human rights in Malta
- Intersex rights in Malta
- Politics of Malta
- LGBT rights in Europe
- LGBT rights in the European Union
- MGRM: The Malta LGBTIQ Rights Movement

== Selected literature ==
- Bartolo, Simon (2018). A Seat at the Table: The Coming of Age of the LGBTIQ Movement in Malta. Self-published. ISBN 978-99957-1-268-6.
- Cassar, Carmel (2003). "Homosexuality and Moral Values in Historical Perspective: The Case of Malta in a European Context". In Paul A. Bartolo and Mark G. Borg (ed.). Homosexuality: Challenging the Stigma (PDF). Agenda. pp. 103–122. ISBN 99932-622-4-2.
- Drachma Parents' Group (various) (2016). Uliedna Rigal: 50 mistoqsija u tweġiba għal ġenituri ta' wlied LGBTIQ (in Maltese). Books Distributors Limited (BDL). ISBN 978-99957-63-25-1.
