= Malta LGBTIQ Rights Movement =

LGBT rights organisation in Malta

MGRM

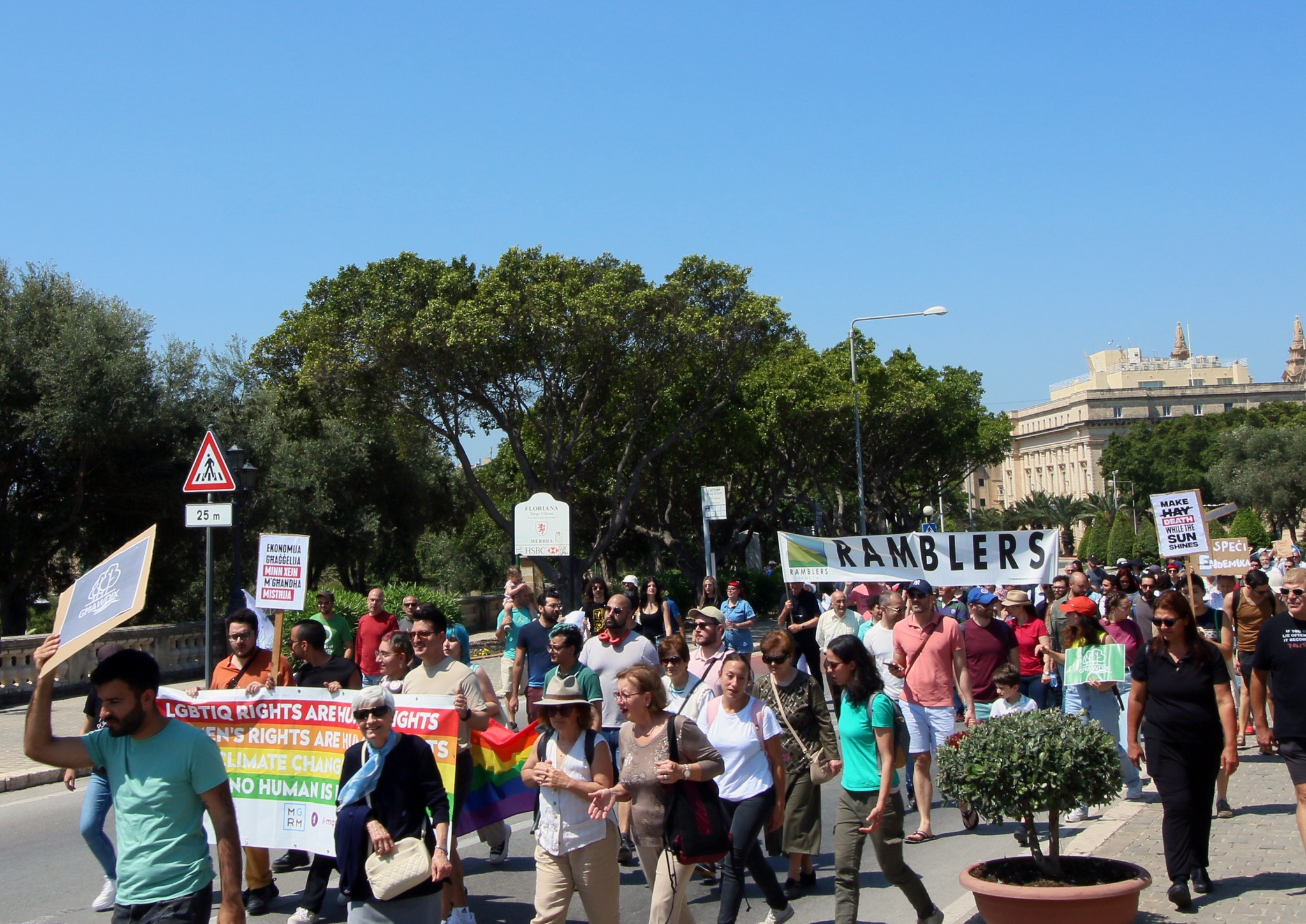
- MGRM attending a 2023 environmental protest
- Founded: 2001; 25 years ago (Malta)
- Type: Non-governmental organisation
- Headquarters: Mosta, Malta
- Location: Mosta, Malta
- Co-Coordinator: Amanda Cossai
- Co-Coordinator: Mohamed Ali (Dali) Aguerbi
- Affiliations: ILGA, ILGA-Europe, IGLYO, TGEU, AIDS Action Europe, NELFA
- Website: www.maltagayrights.org
- Formerly called: Malta Gay Rights Movement

The Malta LGBTIQ Rights Movement, previously known as the Malta Gay Rights Movement (MGRM), is an LGBTIQ rights organisation in Malta. It advocates for equality of all people regardless of sexual orientation, gender identity, sex characteristics and expression.

It was set up in 2001, making it the first and most influential LGBTIQ+ lobbying group in Malta, which organised the first Pride March in Malta and launched the first national gay helpline in 2004. Since then, MGRM has had a key role in lobbying for legislation, carrying out research and providing support to Malta's LGBTIQ community.

== History ==
MGRM's origins started from a group called The Malta Gay and Lesbian Civil Rights Movement, set up in a bar called The Yellow Cadillac in Gżira by a group of people who wished to discuss gay rights in Malta. When the group disbanded, some members including Sonja Casha and Chris Attard decided that they wished to resume their activism work, so they got together alongside some volunteers, and drew up the first statute of the Malta Gay Rights Movement. The group set up its headquarters in Mosta towards 2004, from where it still operates today.

== Leadership ==
Sandro Mangion joined the group as the first official Coordinator of MGRM and remained the group's coordinator until Colette Farrugia Bennett was elected Coordinator following his departure. In 2010, Gabi Calleja became Coordinator seeing the group through the legal achievements that led to Malta becoming the top ranking country in terms of its LGBT rights in ILGA-Europe's Rainbow European Map Index

The group is currently led by Amanda Cossai and Mohamed Ali (Dali) Aguerbi.

== Support work ==
=== National Gay Helpline ===
Between 2001 and 2004, MGRM's first committee members came together for the very purpose of setting up Malta's first national gay helpline. The helpline launched in 2004, and was originally available on Mondays, Wednesdays and Fridays. The helpline remains operational through MGRM's Rainbow Support Service

=== Rainbow support service ===
In 2013, the National Gay Helpline was transformed into the Rainbow Support Service. The service was a collaboration between MGRM, Agenzija Zghazagh and the Embassy of the United States. The service is available to LGBTIQ+ persons and their family and friends, and provides information, consultation and psycho-social welfare services. The service is now funded through a Public Social Partnership with the MInistry for Social Policy and Children's Rights.

=== Dar il-Qawsalla ===
In 2020 MGRM participated in an initiative by the Ministry of Social Accommodation through which MGRM was awarded a dilapidated house in San Ġwann named Dar il-Qawsalla (Rainbow House). Once the house is restored, MGRM will be managing the first assisted living residence for LGBTIQ persons in Malta. MGRM expects to welcome its first guests in 2024.

=== HIV Malta ===
MGRM launched HIV Malta in September 2019, with the aim to de-stigmatise HIV and start a conversation with easily accessible information. Through this project, MGRM extended its Rainbow Support Service to people living with HIV, and lobbied for better treatment and free preventative care.

== Legal activism ==
=== Ban on Discrimination on the basis of Sexual Orientation ===
MGRM's first success in its lobbying for full equal rights related to the ban discrimination on the basis of sexual orientation. The group lobbied for full implementation of Employment Directive 2000/78/EC which provided this legal protection. The ban was eventually enacted through a 2004 Legal Notice that amended the Employment and Industrial Relations Act.

=== 2008 general elections petition ===
In the run-up of the 2008 Maltese general election, MGRM launched a petition which was presented to all political parties participating in the election. Through the petition, signatories declared that they supported MGRM's claims for greater LGBT rights, and demanded:

- Formal recognition of the rights of same-sex couples.
- The inclusion of an article in the Criminal Code regarding homophobic and transphobic violence, and a clear strategy addressing homophobic and transphobic bullying in schools.
- Legal protection against discrimination in the delivery of goods and services expressly referring to the grounds of sexual orientation, gender identity and gender expression.
- The formal extension of the remit of the National Commission for the Promotion of Equality to cater for the grounds of sexual orientation, gender identity and gender expression.
- The inclusion of gender reassignment surgery and hormone therapy for transgender persons as part of the public health services

The petition attracted 1,000 signatories and set the group's activism plan in upcoming years.

=== Marriage equality ===
On 28 October 2010, the Government of Malta announced that it was working on a Cohabitation Bill to regulate same-sex relationships, instead of a bill that recognised same-sex relationships at par with marriage. MGRM criticised this bill, pointing out that the proposed law "fails to attain even the minimal level of recognition acceptable". The bill did not include same-sex couples in the legal definition of "family" which meant that if a same-sex couple with children moved to Malta, the child would lose a legal parent, constituting a breach to children's rights and freedom of movement where EU citizens are concerned. The bill eventually failed to make it to law with the dissolution of Government in December 2012.

A new Labour Party (Malta) Government launched a full Civil Unions bill which included same-sex couples within the definition of 'family' at the top of the agenda, a move welcomed by MGRM. The new government also dropped its objections to a long-standing court case through which it objected to the right of a post-op transgender woman to marry, a decision which Gabi Calleja described as approaching conformity to European law at least in so far as marriage is concerned. The Civil Unions Bill was approved by Parliament in October 2013, and signed by the President Marie-Louise Coleiro Preca in April 2014. The delay was reportedly the result of the refusal of President George Abela to sign the law, which necessitated a change in President for the bill to become law.

In September 2017, full Marriage Equality was reached with a new law that amended the Marriage Act to now also allow same-sex couples to marry. This means that couples in Malta now have a choice between civil unions or marriage.

=== Gender identity ===
In 2010, MGRM presented a document entitled "A Proposed Gender Identity Act" to the Maltese Government. The aim of the study was to propose a legal approach to transgender persons that builds upon Act XVIII of 2004 of the laws of Malta, which set up a procedure for the rectification of acts of birth and other personal documentation, to reflect gender affirmation. Notwithstanding this Act, several impediments still existed for transgender people, as exemplified by case of Joanne Cassar who was actively fighting a lengthy case in front of multiple courts in order to win the right to marry.

MGRM's Gender Identity Act proposal formed the basis of a public consultation, which eventually became law in 2015 through the Gender Identity, Gender Expression And Sex Characteristics Act. TGEU described the act as setting 'a new benchmark in Europe' through its 'respectful, comprehensive and yet practical aspirations'.

=== Conversion therapy ===
MGRM is a main proponent of the cause against conversion therapy. It led and participated in protests to emphasise the harms of conversion therapy and called for a ban on this practice. MGRM called religious organizations' resistance to a proposed 2015 bill presented to Parliament by Helena Dalli as being 'profoundly flawed'. The bill eventually passed through all stages of Parliament until it became law through the Affirmation of Sexual Orientation, Gender Identity and Gender Expression Act on 6 December 2016, a first such law in Europe. On 12 January 2022 it was announced that the legislation would be strengthened to also make it illegal for anyone to promote the practice.

== Publications ==
Year	Title	Author	ISBN	Note
2024	The First Walk Under the Rainbow / L-Ewwel Mixja Taħt il-Qawsalla	Johann Agius	978-9918-0-0963-3	A recollection of the first pride march in Malta.
2022	Katya - Easy on the Tonic	Ramona Depares	978-9918-0-0380-8	The authorised biography of Katya Saunders, one of Malta's first openly transgender women
2021	20 Years of Trailblazing	MGRM	978-9918-0-0172-9	Commemoration of MGRM's 20 year anniversary
2018	A Seat at the Table	Simon Bartolo	978-99957-1-268-6	A series of interviews and narrations with key activists, politicians, religious figures, entertainers and young activists who have had a role in shaping the LGBTIQ+ history of Malta
2018	LGBTIQ youth activism : the past & the present	Kirsty Farrugia & Bizuayehu Castaniere	978-99957-1-387-4	Exploring the history of LGBTIQ+ activism and its importance via the experiences of a number of activists from the community

== See also ==
- LGBTQ rights in Malta
- Same-sex marriage in Malta
- Gabi Calleja
