= C215 (street artist) =

French street artist

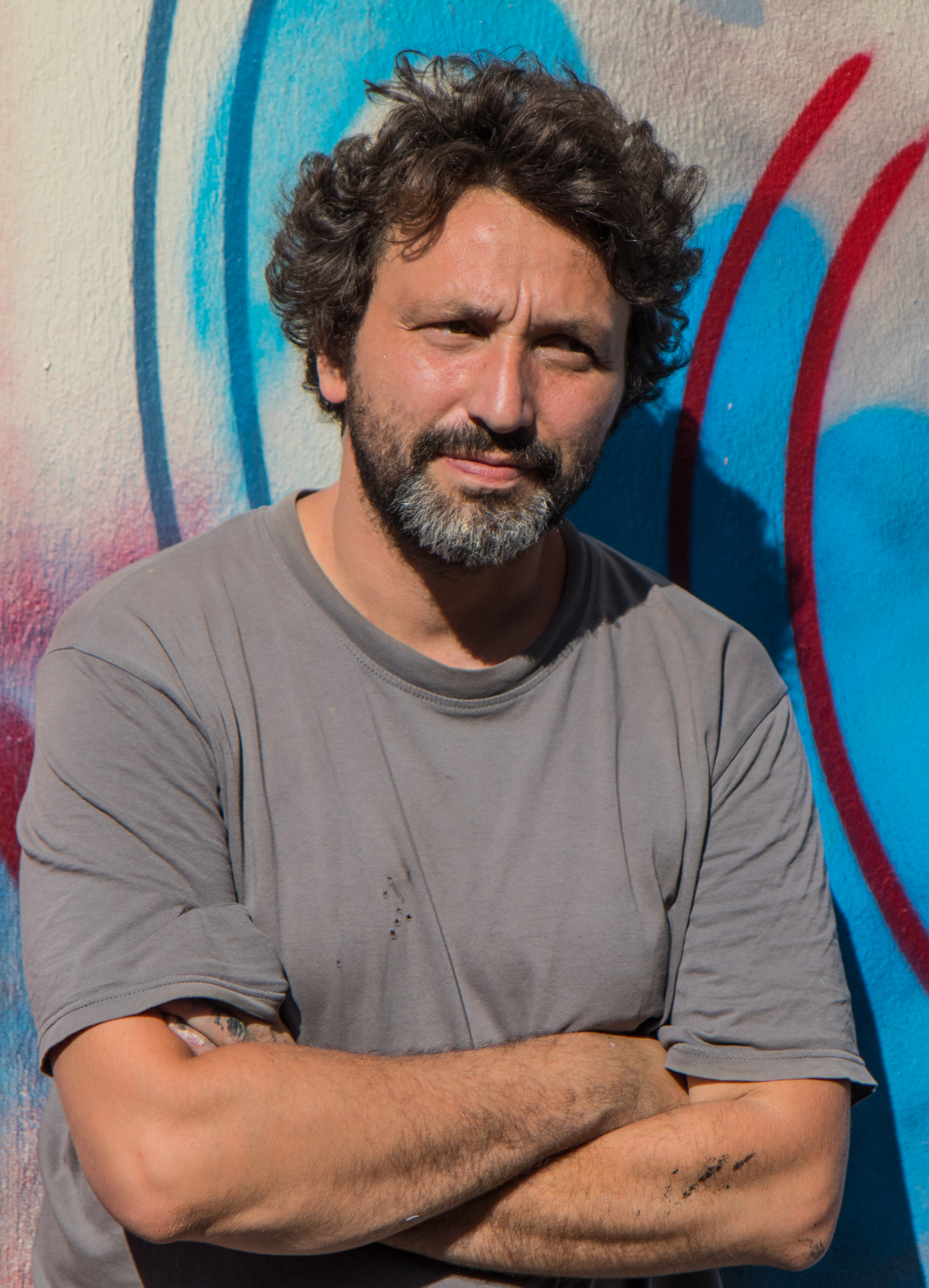
- C215 in 2016
- Born: Christian Guémy; 1973 (age 51–52); Bondy, France
- Known for: Graffiti, street art
- Style: Stencils
- Website: www.c215.fr

C215 is the moniker of Christian Guémy, a French street artist from Paris who has been described as "France's answer to Banksy".

== Artwork ==
C215 primarily uses stencils to produce his art. His first stencil work was put up in 2006, but he has been a graffiti artist for (as of 2011) over 20 years. His work consists mainly of close up portraits of people. C215's subjects are typically those such as beggars, homeless people, refugees, street kids and the elderly. The rationale behind this choice of subject is to draw attention to those that society has forgotten about. Cats are another frequent subject of his work. C215 is a prolific street artist and has practiced his art in cities all over the world. His stencils may be seen in Barcelona, Amsterdam, London, Rome, Paris, Oslo, Colombo and different cities of Morocco.

In October 2014, C215 visited Valletta, Malta, because of his interest in Caravaggio as well as 17th-century religious architecture. He produced various examples of street art on post boxes within the city, but MaltaPost removed the artworks after a few days, an issue that created controversy and was extensively reported upon by Maltese journalist Ramona Depares. Various people criticized MaltaPost for removing the artworks, including the mayor of Valletta Alexei Dingli.

In addition to his street work, C215 also produces commercial artwork for galleries on wood and canvas. C215 has to date done a number of solo gallery shows to promote his work. C215 had a show entitled 'Community Service', in Paris in 2010.

Some of his works appear in the video game Far Cry 4.

== Awards ==
- Knight of the National Order of Merit: Guémy was appointed to the rank of Knight of the National Order of Merit by decree of the French President of the Republic dated November 29, 2023.
- Knight of the Order of Arts and Letters Knight of the Order of Arts and Letters: Guémy was appointed to the rank of Knight of the Order of Arts and Letters by order of the French Minister of Culture on September 16, 2019, integrating the French promotion of summer 2019.
- By order of July 13, 2024 from the Ministry of Justice (NOR: JUSK2420908A), Christian Guémy was awarded the Medal of Honor of the French Prison Administration at the bronze level.

== Gallery ==
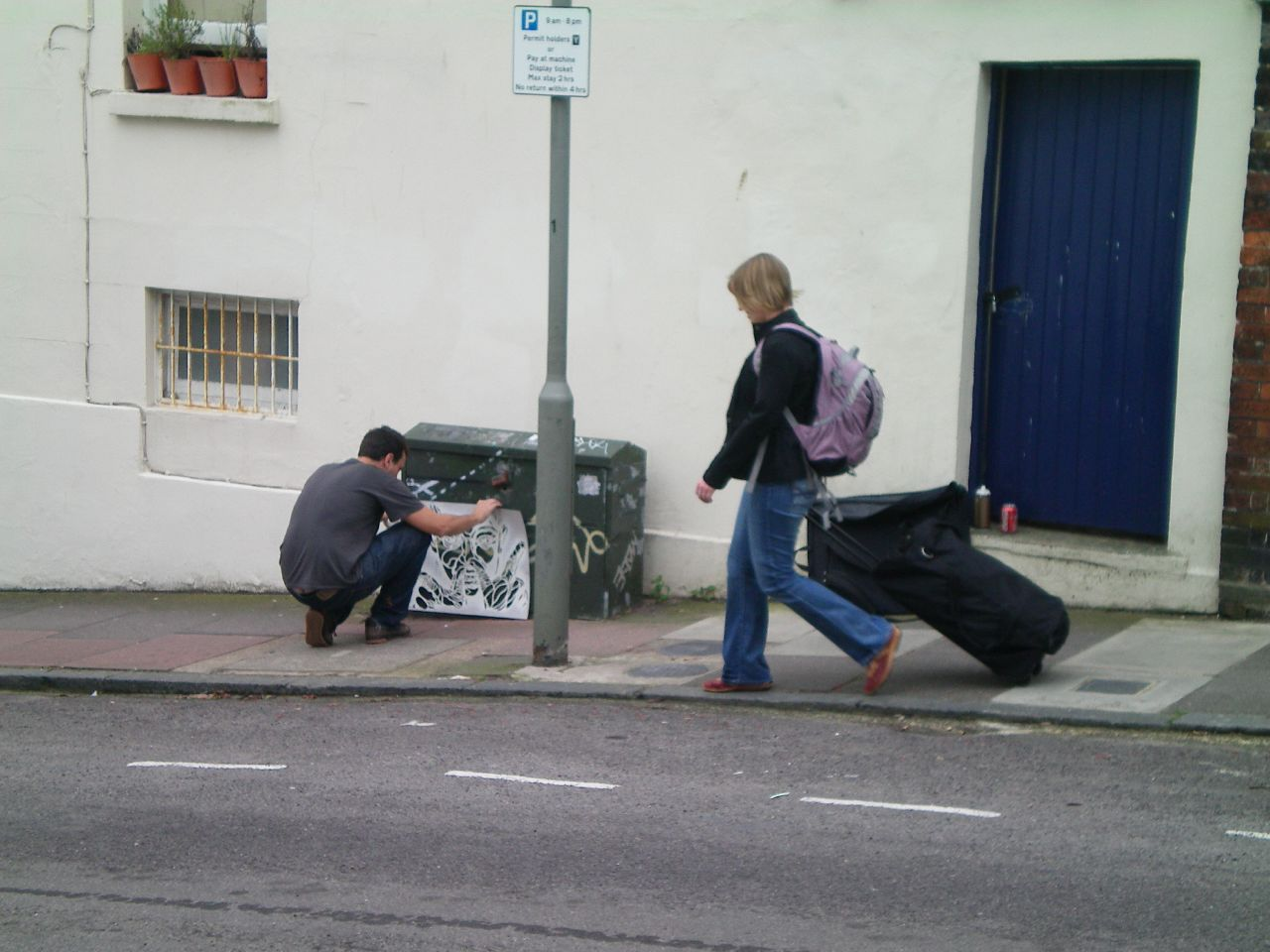
The artist putting a stencil on a utility box in Brighton, 2008

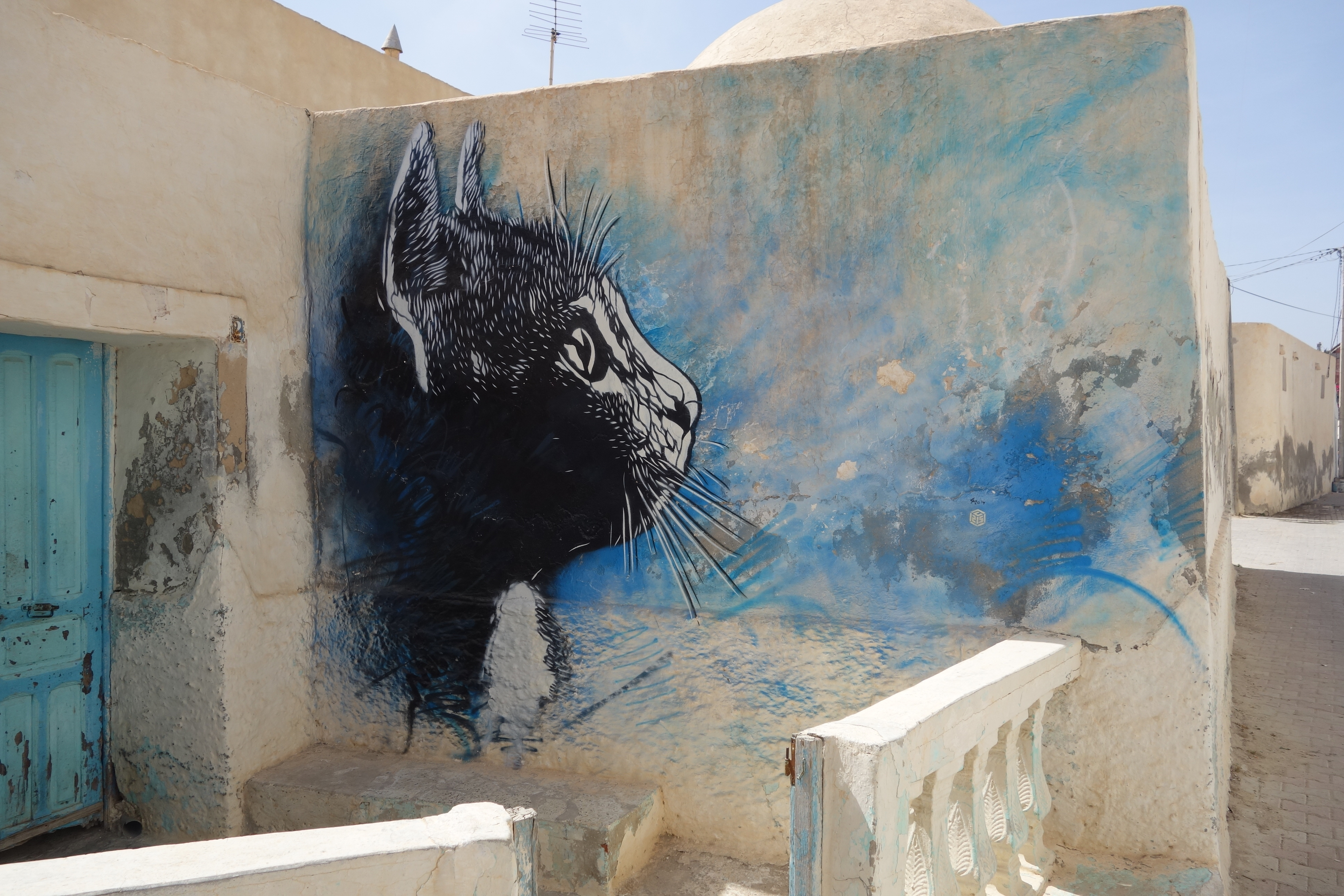
Mural in Djerbahood, Tunisia
