= Maltese passport =

Travel document for citizens of Malta

Maltese passport; Passaport Malti
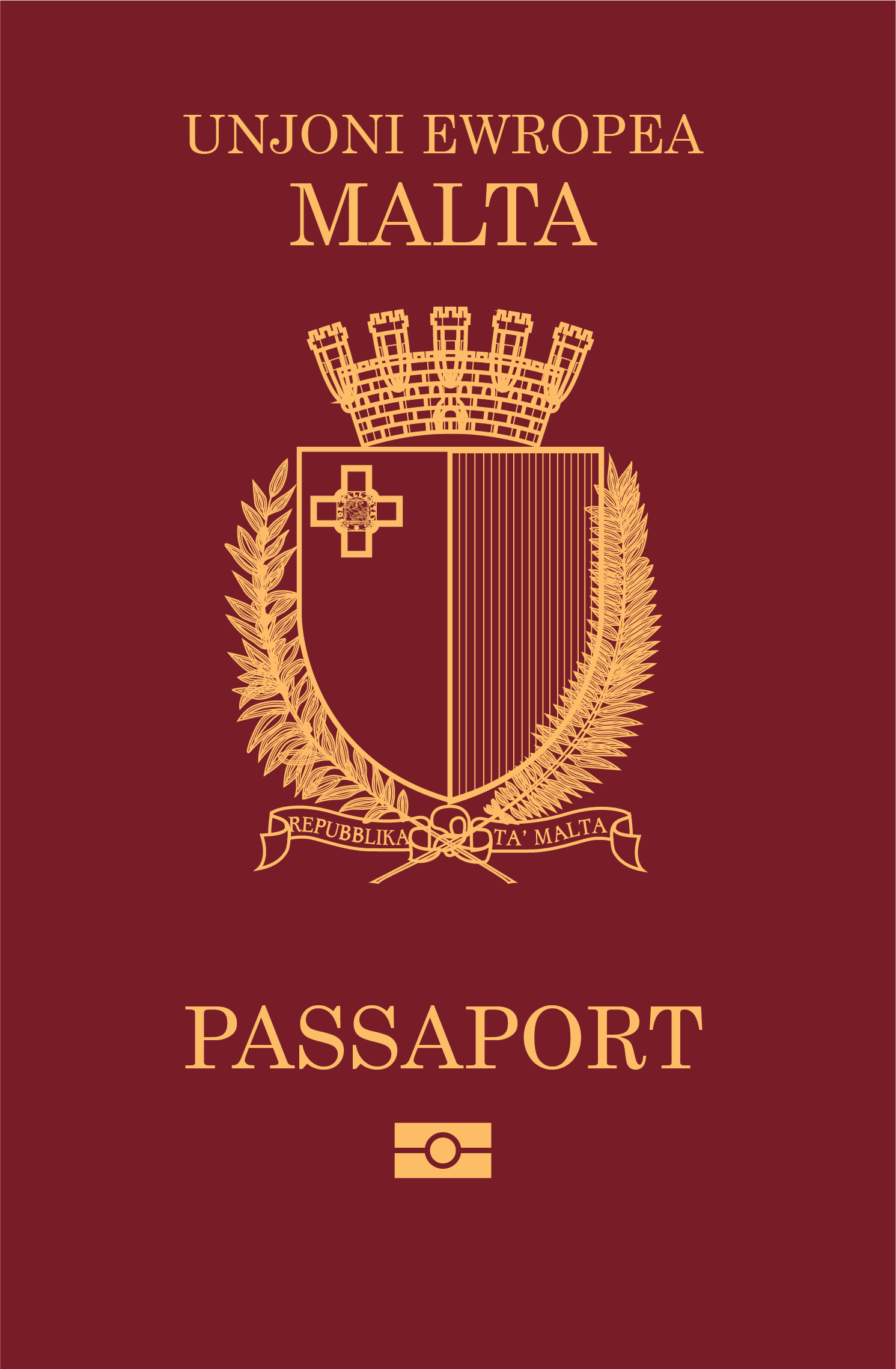
- Type: Passport
- Issued by: Passport Office
- First issued: 29 September 2008 (biometric passport); 15 November 2019 (current version)
- Purpose: Identification
- Eligibility: Maltese citizenship
- Expiration: 10 years for individuals aged 16 and over; 5 years for minors under 16
- Cost: €70-80 (applicants aged 16 and over; higher fee applies April to August); €40 (applicants aged 10 to 15); €16 (applicants under 10)

The Maltese passport (Maltese: passaport Malti) is a passport that is issued to the citizens of Malta. Every Maltese citizen is also a Commonwealth citizen and citizen of the European Union. The Maltese passport, along with the national identity card, allows for free rights of movement and residence in all member states of the European Economic Area, as well as Switzerland.

== Physical appearance ==
Maltese passports share the common design standards of European Union passports. The cover is burgundy with the coat of arms of Malta emblazoned in the centre. The words "UNJONI EWROPEA" (English: European Union) and "MALTA" are inscribed above the coat of arms and the word "PASSAPORT" (English: Passport) and the international biometric passport symbol are inscribed below it.

=== Passport note ===
The passport contains a note from the issuing authority addressed to the authorities of all other states, identifying the bearer as a citizen of Malta and requesting that they be allowed to pass and be treated according to international norms. The note inside of a Maltese passport states:

The Maltese Government requests all those whom it may concern to allow the bearer to pass freely without let or hindrance and to afford the bearer every assistance and protection as may be necessary.

Every citizen of the Union shall, in the territory of a non-EU country in which the Member State of which he is a national is not represented, be entitled to protection by the diplomatic or consular authorities of any Member State, on the same conditions of the nationals of that State.

== Visa requirements ==
Visa requirements for Maltese citizens Malta Freedom of movement Visa free Visa issued upon arrival eVisa Visa available both on arrival or online Visa required prior to arrival

Visa requirements for Maltese citizens are administrative entry restrictions imposed by the authorities of foreign states on citizens of Malta. As of 3 February 2026, Maltese citizens had visa-free or visa on arrival access (including eTAs) to 184 countries and territories, ranking the Maltese passport 5th globally in terms of travel freedom (tied with Austrian, Greek and Portuguese passports) according to the Henley Passport Index. Meanwhile, Arton Capital's Passport Index ranked the Maltese passport 6th in the world in terms of travel freedom, with a mobility score of 171 (tied with Croatian, Estonian, Hungarian, Latvian, Polish, Slovak, and Slovenian passports), as of 3 February 2026.

Additionally, Maltese citizens can live and work in any country within the European Economic Area (including the member states of the European Union and the European Free Trade Association) as a result of the right of free movement and residence granted in Article 21 of the Treaty on the Functioning of the European Union.

== Investment-based citizenship scheme ==
Malta began a citizenship by investment scheme in 2014 known as the Individual Investor Programme (IIP) where non-citizens could apply for Maltese citizenship in exchange for a significant contribution to a national development fund and other Maltese investments, contingent on maintaining residence in Malta and passing criminal background checks. Henley & Partners was originally appointed as sole agent to administer the IIP, but the Maltese government later opened the scheme to Maltese firms too. The procedure is overseen by the Citizenship Unit of the government's Identity Malta Agency.

The number and background of persons granted Maltese citizenship based on investment is unknown, as the Maltese government does not publish such data. Malta's Data Protection Commissioner confirmed that the publication of the number of passport buyers and their country of origin “may prejudice relations with a number of the countries of origin” and that revealing the agencies that handled their application “could reasonably be expected to prejudice commercial interests and, ultimately, the competitiveness of approved agents as it would reveal commercially-sensitive information”.

The list of persons who were naturalised Maltese in the year 2015 includes over 900 names (listed by first name) without indication of previous/second citizenships and of reasons for naturalisation. Maltese politicians and commentators outside of the country viewed this process negatively, due to its potential for abuse by rich individuals who wished to acquire EU citizenship. The Maltese government, however, stated that these applications underwent careful scrutiny. The European Parliament had objected to the programme as a sell-out of EU citizenship.

The income from Malta's passport sale amounted to €163.5 million in 2016. Of this, 70% is deposited in the National Development and Social Fund (NDSF), which was set up in July 2016. The use of the fund by the government is not regulated.

=== Criticism ===
The scheme has often come under fire for being a fraudulent scheme where the Maltese Government sells EU citizenship to anyone willing to pay the price, legitimately or illegally, to the detriment of the Maltese people and the European Union as a whole. Many who were granted a Maltese passport were found to be large-scale international criminals with ties to money laundering in multiple countries. The background checks performed on those willing to pay for citizenship have been criticized as being almost non-existent.

Although the scheme is leaving money in the Maltese economy, it is doing so at the expense of the average Maltese citizen, as the Golden Passport scheme is partly responsible for the enormous inflation of the Maltese Housing Index since its introduction. This phenomenon occurs because passport applicants are required to purchase or rent a property in Malta in order for the passport to be granted. Many of these properties have been found to left vacant with the owner in some occasions never even setting foot in Malta.

=== ECJ Court ruling ===
In 2025 the European Court of Justice (ECJ) ruled against the scheme of the Golden Passport, finding Malta's policy made nationality a "mere commercial transaction" and that the "practice does not make it possible to establish the necessary bond of solidarity and good faith between a member state and its citizens, or to ensure mutual trust between member states." This ruling was made despite a 2024 judicial opinion by then EU Court of Justice's Advocate-General Anthony Collins (judge) which supported the program and proposed that the court dismissed the case. After the 2025 ruling, Malta's Prime Minister Robert Abela defended the scheme, in a statement saying it had earned Malta over €1.4 billion ($1.6 billion) and would rework the system to align with the court's decision.

== See also ==
- Henley & Partners Visa Restrictions Index
- Immigration to Malta
- Maltese identity card
- Maltese nationality law
- Passports of the European Union
- Visa requirements for Maltese citizens
