= Maltese identity card =

National identity card of Malta

- Type: Compulsory identity document
- Issued by: Identità
- Valid in: EFTA; European Union; United Kingdom (EU Settlement Scheme); Rest of Europe (except Belarus, Russia, and Ukraine) Georgia; Montserrat (max. 14 days); Overseas France); Turkey
- Eligibility: Maltese citizenship
- Expiration: 10 years

Maltese identity cards are issued to Maltese citizens. They can be used as a travel document when visiting countries in the European Union and the European Economic Area.

They can also be used instead of a Maltese passport to visit French overseas territories, Georgia, Montserrat (for max. 14 days) Turkey and organized tours to Tunisia.

In August 2020, new electronic ID cards conforming to new EU standards under Regulation 2019/1157 began to be issued.

== Information provided ==
The cards feature a birth certificate ID consisting of seven numbers and a letter registered with the Public Registry Department with the last letter indicating the island and the century of birth:

- A: Foreign residents holding an eRes Card.
- B: Maltese citizens born in the island of Malta in the 19th century.
- G: Maltese citizens born in Gozo in the 20th century.
- H: Maltese citizens born in Gozo in the 21st century.
- L: Maltese citizens born in the island of Malta in the 21st century.
- M: Maltese citizens born in the island of Malta in the 20th century.
- P: Applicable to Maltese citizens who are unable to obtain their original birth certificate from their country of birth in order to be registered in Malta.
- Z: Maltese citizens born in Gozo in the 19th century.

== See also ==
- Maltese passport
- Visa policy of Malta
- Visa requirements for Maltese citizens
- National identity cards in the European Union
