= The President's Foundation for the Wellbeing of Society =

Non-governmental organisation in Malta

- Il-Fondazzjoni Tal-President Għall-Ġid tas-Soċjetà
- Plaque at the foundation offices in San Anton Palace
- Formation: 25 June 2014; 11 years ago
- Founder: Marie-Louise Coleiro Preca
- Founded at: Attard, Malta
- Type: Non-governmental organisation
- Headquarters: San Anton Palace; Attard, Malta
- Director-General: Ruth Farrugia
- Website: pfws.org.mt

The President's Foundation for the Wellbeing of Society (Maltese: Il-Fondazzjoni Tal-President Għall-Ġid tas-Soċjetà) was a non-governmental organisation located in Malta, focusing on social research, community consultation, and project work. The Foundation was established on 25 June 2014 by Marie-Louise Coleiro Preca, during her term as the 9th President of Malta and terminated with the end of her tenure in 2019. A new organisation, the 'Malta Foundation for the Wellbeing of Society' now exists, unaffiliated with the President of Malta.

The Foundation consisted of two principal branches; the Research Entities and Consultative Fora. These operated alongside other constituent entities, including the Children's Hub (and its flagship project 'The President's Secret Garden') and International Institute for Peace and Wellbeing. The Foundation maintained memoranda of understanding with various international organisations, in order to further its goals of securing individual and communal wellbeing in Maltese society. Organisations with whom the Foundation maintained close contact include UNESCO, ISESCO, UN Women, and the Sovereign Military Order of Malta, and academic connections with the University of Cambridge and Columbia University.

The Director-General of the President's Foundation throughout its existence was Dr Ruth Farrugia, and the Foundation Council of Governors included former presidents and prime ministers of the Republic of Malta Eddie Fenech Adami, Lawrence Gonzi, and Ugo Mifsud Bonnici. The Foundation worked closely with the University of Malta, and included the incumbent Rector of the University as a member of the Council of Governors. As an NGO subject to the Commissioner for Voluntary Organisations, Malta.

== Research Entities now Defunct or Modified ==
=== National Institute for Childhood ===
The Institute for Childhood exists to promote children’s wellbeing through research, dissemination of research, consultation with relevant stake holders and active participation in debates in matters concerning children and their relationships with significant others.

=== National Hub for Ethnobotanical Research ===
The Hub exists to explore and inspire relationships between people through their cultural experience of the natural world. The Hub's first research publication was launched in April 2016.

=== National Family Research Centre ===
The Family Research Centre promotes understanding through research on all aspects of family life with special emphasis on fostering mutual care and respect in relationships. Research detailing the wellbeing of people in relationships in the Maltese Islands was released in 2016.

=== National Centre for Freedom from Addiction ===
The Centre mission is that of contributing towards nurturing a society that is free from addictive behaviour in all its forms for the purpose of promoting personal, interpersonal and social wellbeing.

=== National Observatory for Living with Dignity ===
The Observatory exists to promote a dignified life for all by critically engaging with knowledge, social structures and human relations, especially through generating empirical data, valorising experiential knowledge and providing access to reliable information on issues related to ecological, social economic and cultural inclusion. The latest research launched by the Observatory included a national study on early school leavers, and the effects of early school leaving on wellbeing.

== Consultative Fora ==
The Consultative Fora within the President's Foundation engaged with diverse communities and groups in Malta and Gozo on issues of direct relevance to their wellbeing. Reports compiled from the findings of the Fora were then presented to the President of Malta, and circulated among the Research Entities and other entities within the President's Foundation and beyond.

The results of Fora consultations lead to further research through the Entities, or other actions on topics deemed to be of particular importance. The Consultative Fora included a Disability Forum, Interfaith Forum, Community Forum, Transcultural Dialogue Forum, Ageing With Dignity Forum, Child Forum, Culture Forum (chaired by Professor Joe Friggieri), and Gender Forum.
