= Gabi Calleja =

Maltese LGBT rights activist

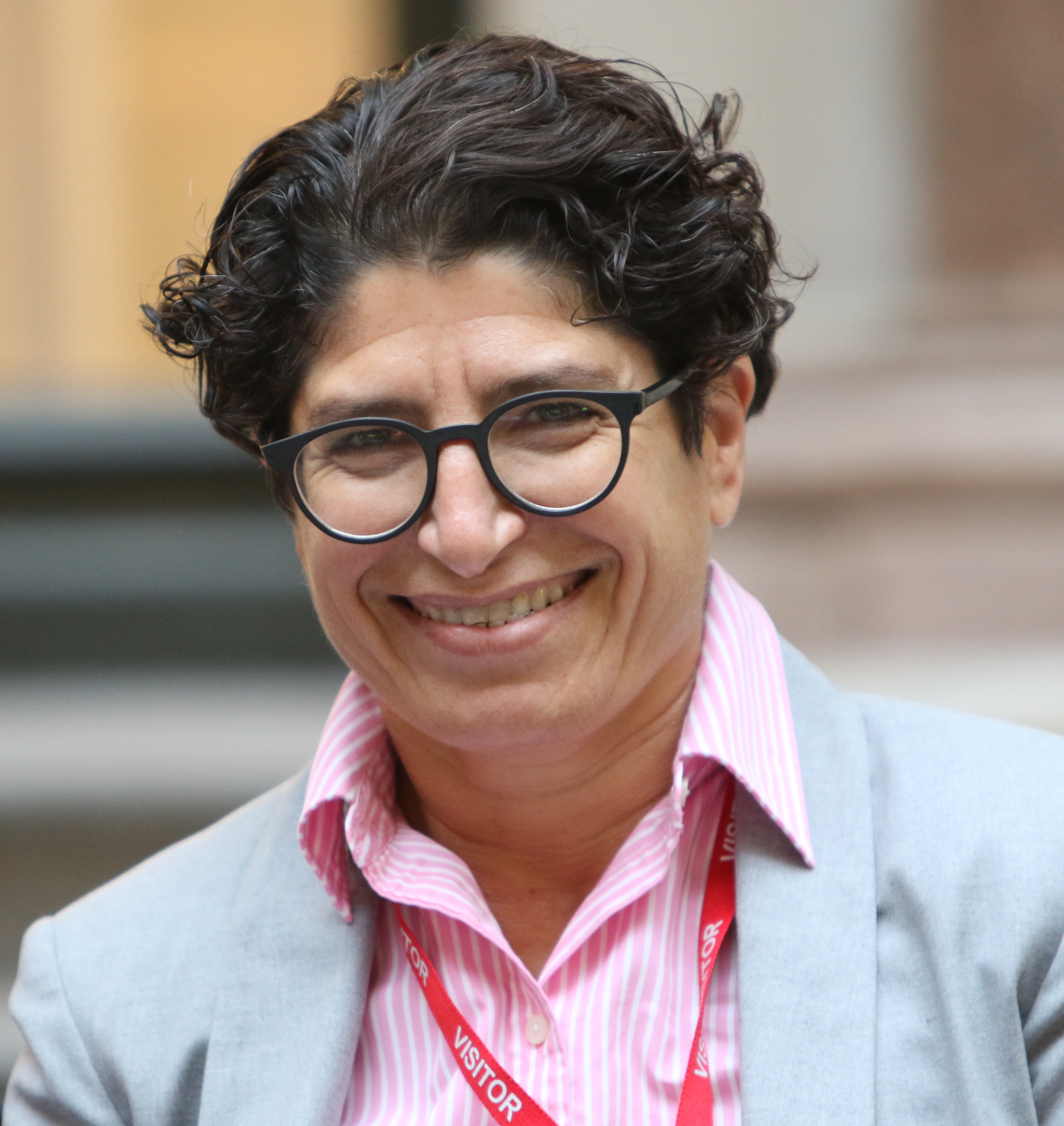
- Calleja in 2016
- Born: Malta
- Education: University of Malta
- Known for: LGBTQ rights activism
- Awards: International Women of Courage Award (2012)

Gabi Calleja is a Maltese LGBTQ rights activist. She has served as coordinator of the Malta Gay Rights Movement and co-chair of the executive board of ILGA Europe. For her work on LGBTQ rights, she was given the International Women of Courage Award in 2012.

== Personal life and education ==
She read for a Master's in Youth and Community Studies at the University of Malta. She is gay.

== Activism ==
By 2010, Calleja was the coordinator of the Malta Gay Rights Movement. In this role, Calleja's work included presenting reports on LGBTQ discrimination to the Social Affairs Committee of the Maltese Parliament. In 2015, she was appointed chairperson of the LGBTI Consultative Council. By 2023, Calleja was the head of the Sexual Orientation, Gender Identity, Gender Expression and Sex Characteristics Unit (SOGIGESC).

Within Malta, Calleja has fought for issues such as recognition of same-sex marriage, the legalization of same-sex adoption, the rights of gender-nonconforming and trans students, and equal access to IVF. She has called for the banning of conversion therapy and the repeal of a ban preventing gay men from donating blood.

By 2013, she was co-chair of the executive board of ILGA Europe, a lesbian and gay advocacy group. In 2014, she spoke publicly in favor of Denmark removing a law which had required transgender people to undergo sterilization before they were legally allowed to change their gender.

== Career ==
In addition to her work on LGBTQ rights, she is also a senior executive in the public sector in Malta, and has worked in the fields of teaching, drug prevention, training, community development, fundraising, and project management. In 2005, the “School Attendance Improvement” Report, a review of absenteeism from school in Malta, was published; she had been part of the group appointed to write it.

== Awards and recognition ==
She received a 2012 International Women of Courage Award for her work on human rights.

In 2014, Calleja was nominated for the Human Rights Award at the inaugural LGBTI Community Awards in Malta.
