= Katya Saunders =

Maltese transgender icon & activist

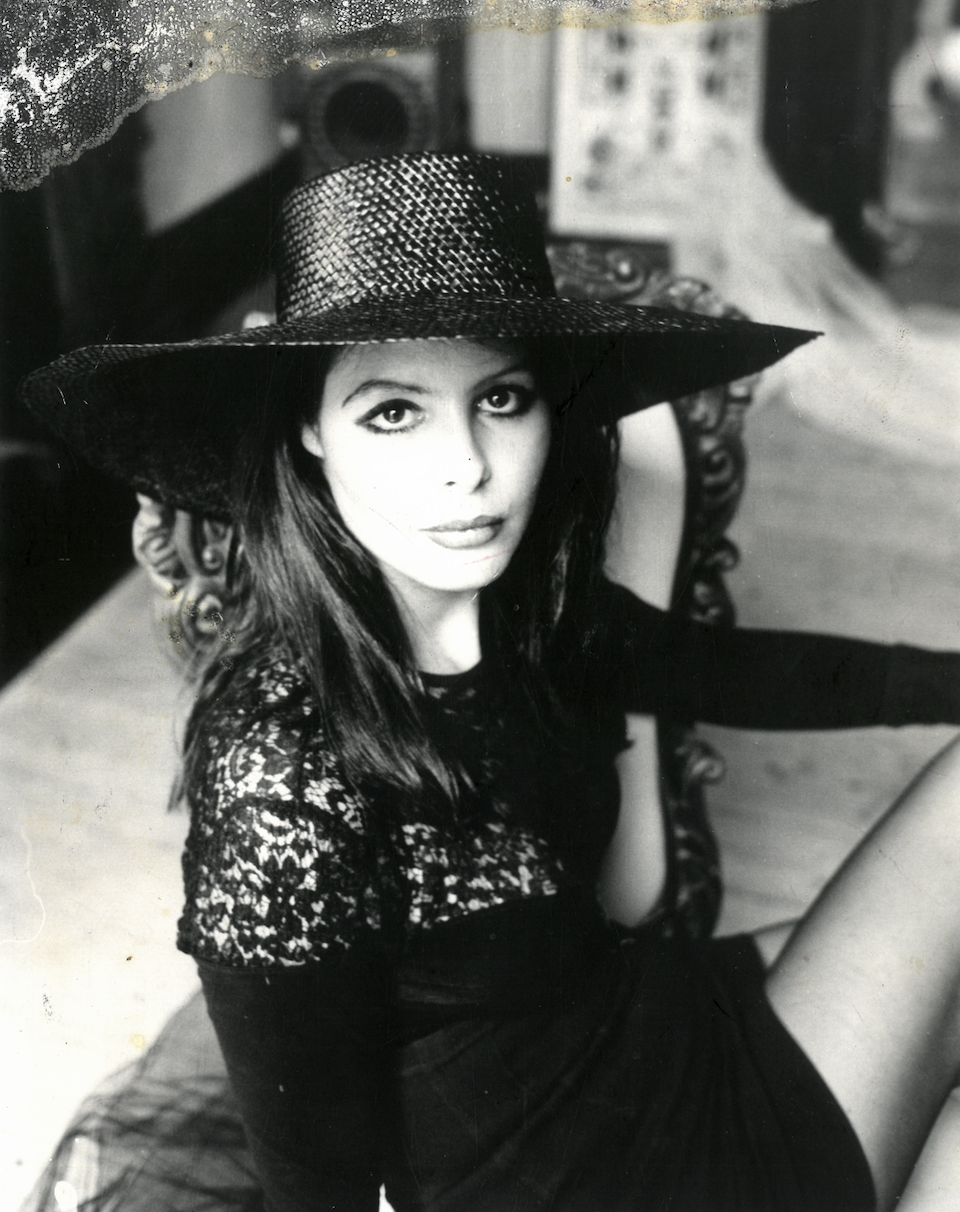
Katya Saunders.

Katya Saunders (10 April 1957 – 27 January, 2019) was a Maltese LGBTIQ+ icon who was one of the first openly transgender women and gay activists in Malta. She was also a well-known cabaret performer in clubs in Malta and London throughout the 1970s.

Saunders spent a portion of her life living in London and New York, where she became a known figure in fashion circles and is described as being the muse behind some of fashion designers Charles & Ron's collections.

Saunders is credited as being responsible for starting an LGBTIQ+ community in Malta and was closely associated with the City of London Bar in St.Julian's, where her photos are still displayed prominently.

Her death was marked by tributes from members of the LGBTIQ+ community, who described her as a mentor and an inspirational figure for past and current gay activists. Her funeral was held at the Balluta Church, in Sliema, followed by a wake at the City of London Bar.

Saunders’ life is detailed in a biography titled Katya: Easy on the Tonic, written by journalist Ramona Depares and published by MGRM in 2022. The publication was accompanied by an exhibition at Spazju Kreattiv in Valletta, showcasing her clothes and memorabilia, curated by Charlie Cauchi and Romeo Roxman Gatt.
