= Maltese nationality law =

Law that declares policies governing Maltese citizenship

Maltese Citizenship Act Att dwar iċ-Ċittadinanza Maltija

Parliament of Malta
- Long title: To provide for the acquisition, deprivation and renunciation of citizenship of Malta and for purposes incidental to or connected with the matters aforesaid.
- Citation: No. 30 of 1965
- Territorial extent: Malta
- Enacted by: Parliament of Malta
- Enacted: 1965
- Commenced: 21 September 1964
- Status: Amended

The primary law governing nationality of Malta is the Maltese Citizenship Act (Maltese: Att dwar iċ-Ċittadinanza Maltija), which came into force on 21 September 1964. Malta is a member state of the European Union (EU), and all Maltese nationals are EU citizens. They are entitled to free movement rights in EU and European Free Trade Association (EFTA) countries, and may vote in elections to the European Parliament for the Malta constituency.

All persons born in Malta between 21 September 1964 and 1 August 1989 automatically received citizenship at birth regardless of the nationalities of their parents. Individuals born in the country since that date receive Maltese citizenship at birth if at least one of their parents is a Maltese citizen or was born in Malta. Foreign nationals may become Maltese citizens by naturalisation after meeting a minimum residence requirement (at least four of the previous seven years).

Malta was a colony of the British Empire until 1964, and local residents were British subjects. Although Maltese citizens no longer hold British nationality, they remain Commonwealth citizens under British law. When residing in the United Kingdom, Maltese citizens are eligible to vote in UK elections and serve in public office there.

== Terminology ==
The distinction between citizenship and nationality is not always clear in the English language and differs by country. Generally, nationality refers to a person's legal belonging to a sovereign state and is the common term used in international treaties when referring to members of a country, while citizenship usually means the set of rights and duties a person has in that nation. In Maltese legislation, the term "citizenship" (ċittadinanza) is used to refer to state membership. Apart from the Maltese Citizenship Act, "nationality" (nazzjonalità) is used in other laws but refers only generically to a person's origin rather than to a specific status. While no authoritative definition exists for either term in Maltese law, "citizenship" would be the technical term used in domestic legislation to refer to members of the national constituency.

== History ==
=== Early modern period and colonial era ===
In 1530, Charles V, Holy Roman Emperor, granted the archipelago of Malta as a fiefdom to the Knights Hospitaller. Although local residents resented being placed under Hospitaller jurisdiction without consultation, the Knights maintained their rule over the islands for the next 268 years until the French invasion of Malta in 1798. After the local population revolted and expelled the French in 1800, Malta came under British control as a protectorate that year. The 1814 Treaty of Paris formally granted Britain full sovereignty over the territory, which became a crown colony the same year. Accordingly, British nationality law applied to the colony, as was the case elsewhere in the British Empire. The Maltese, like other subjects of the Empire, were British subjects; any person born in Malta, the United Kingdom, or anywhere else within Crown dominions was a natural-born British subject.

British nationality law during this time was uncodified and did not have a standard set of regulations, relying instead on past precedent and common law. Until the mid-19th century, it was unclear whether rules for naturalisation in the United Kingdom were applicable elsewhere in the British Empire. Colonies had wide discretion in developing their own procedures and requirements for naturalisation up to that point. In 1847, the Imperial Parliament formalised a clear distinction between subjects who naturalised in the UK and those who did so in other territories. Individuals who naturalised in the UK were deemed to have received the status by imperial naturalisation, which was valid throughout the Empire. Those naturalising in colonies were said to have gone through local naturalisation and were given subject status valid only within the relevant territory; a subject who locally naturalised in Malta was a British subject there, but not in the UK or Canada. When travelling outside the Empire, British subjects who were locally naturalised in a colony were still entitled to imperial protection.

British subject status was standardised as a common nationality across the Empire and its Dominions with passage of the British Nationality and Status of Aliens Act 1914. Although Malta was granted self-governance in 1921, nationality and naturalisation remained under the jurisdiction of the imperial government as reserved matters. Areas of public policy that were deemed to be reserved matters could not be changed under local legislation but only by Westminster.

The 1914 regulations codified the doctrine of coverture into imperial nationality law, under which a woman's consent to marry a foreigner was also assumed to be intent to denaturalise; British women who married foreign men automatically lost their British nationality. A wife married to a husband who lost his British subject status was able to exceptionally retain British nationality by declaration. British-born widows or divorcées who had lost their British nationality through marriage could reacquire that status without meeting residence requirements after their marriage ended.

Imperial nationality law was comprehensively reformed in 1948. The British Nationality Act 1948 redefined British subject to mean any citizen of the United Kingdom, its colonies, or other Commonwealth countries. Commonwealth citizen was first defined in this Act to have the same meaning. While previously all subjects of the Empire held a common status through allegiance to the Crown, each Commonwealth country under the reformed system became responsible for legislating its own nationality laws and would maintain a common status by voluntary agreement among all the member states. British subjects under the previous meaning who held that status on 1 January 1949 because of a connection with the United Kingdom or a remaining colony (including Malta) became Citizens of the United Kingdom and Colonies (CUKC). The 1948 Act also repealed marital denaturalisation; women who married foreign men no longer lost British nationality upon marriage.

=== Changing relationship with Britain ===
Commonwealth citizens initially held an automatic right to settle in the United Kingdom and Ireland under the reformed system of 1948. British authorities systematically discouraged non-white immigration into the UK, but strong economic conditions in Britain following the Second World War attracted an unprecedented wave of colonial migration. In response, the British Parliament imposed immigration controls on any subjects originating from outside the British Islands with the Commonwealth Immigrants Act 1962. Ireland had continued to allow free movement to all British subjects following its independence in 1922 as part of the Common Travel Area arrangement, but moved to mirror Britain's restriction in 1962 by limiting this ability only to people born in the British Isles. Britain somewhat relaxed these measures in 1971 for patrials, subjects whose parents or grandparents were born in the United Kingdom.

Malta's finances were strained after the Second World War, and the colony came close to bankruptcy in 1951. The circumstances prompted substantial debate over the territory's future. Although a plurality of voters chose a closer union with Britain in a 1956 referendum, disagreements between the British and Maltese governments over the UK's financial contributions to the territory after integration ultimately led to a collapse of negotiations. The 1957 Defence White Paper restructured British defence policy, deprioritising further military investment in Malta. Maltese government ministers responded by shifting their efforts from pursuing integration to demanding independence.

Malta became independent on 21 September 1964 and the citizenship provisions of the Constitution of Malta came into force on the same day. Any CUKC born in Malta automatically acquired Maltese citizenship on that date if at least one parent was also born in the country. Those born overseas acquired it if their father and a paternal grandparent were both born in Malta.

=== Post-independence regulations ===
Individuals born in Malta after independence automatically received citizenship at birth regardless of the nationalities of their parents. Citizenship was transferable by descent to one generation of children born overseas to Maltese fathers or unmarried Maltese mothers. Foreign women married to Maltese men could acquire citizenship by registration with no further requirements. Under the Maltese Citizenship Act enacted in 1965, Commonwealth citizens were also eligible to become citizens by registration after residing in Malta for five years while all other foreign citizens could naturalise after six years of residence.

Holding multiple citizenships was constitutionally prohibited, and any adult citizen who held other nationalities was required to renounce them by 21 September 1967. Maltese children with multiple nationalities were required to choose between their Maltese and foreign statuses within one year after reaching age 18. Any adult citizen who naturalised as a foreign citizen automatically lost their Maltese citizenship, and foreigners who acquired Maltese citizenship were required to renounce their foreign nationalities. Until 1 January 1977, children adopted by Maltese citizens automatically acquired citizenship on the date of their adoption.

Preferences afforded to Commonwealth citizens were abolished in 1989; the residence requirement for naturalisation was reduced to five years and Commonwealth citizens have since been treated in the same way as other foreign citizens. Commonwealth and Irish citizens are still classified in Maltese law as non-foreign, but there are no benefits provided to either group. The UK itself updated its nationality law to reflect the reduced extent of its remaining territories and possessions with the British Nationality Act 1981, which redefined British subject to no longer also mean Commonwealth citizen.

=== Expanded citizenship access for Maltese diaspora ===
In line with a global shift in citizenship law, reforms in 1989 moved the basis for acquiring Maltese citizenship from a doctrine of birthright to that of descent. Unrestricted birthright citizenship was ended in that year and children born in the country since 1 August 1989 are only granted citizenship by birth if at least one parent is a citizen or was also born in Malta. Gender imbalances were removed from legislation as well; citizenship became transferable by descent to children through mothers as well as fathers, and foreign husbands of Maltese women became eligible for citizenship by registration. Automatic acquisition of citizenship by adoption was reintroduced that year, but only for children younger than age 10.

Maltese-born persons were allowed to hold other nationalities in limited circumstances from 1989. Although Maltese citizens still automatically lost citizenship when they naturalised elsewhere, former citizens who were born in Malta and who had been resident in the country of their new citizenship for at least six years became eligible to reacquire Maltese citizenship. Someone who resumed their Maltese citizenship through this method is considered to have never ceased being a citizen. Consequently, children born before 1989 to a formerly Maltese father who subsequently reacquired Maltese citizenship under this provision also became Maltese citizens, backdated to their dates of birth.

All restrictions on holding multiple citizenships were lifted in 2000; Maltese citizens no longer lose their citizenship when acquiring foreign nationalities, and naturalisation applicants are no longer required to renounce their previous citizenships. Maltese emigrants who fulfilled the six-year foreign residence period introduced in 1989 automatically regained their Maltese citizenship and were considered to have never lost that status under this amendment, while those who did not meet this condition could only regain citizenship by registration.

Further reforms in 2007 extended eligibility for citizenship by descent to children born overseas to Maltese citizens who were not born in the country. An individual may acquire citizenship by registration if they have a Maltese-born lineal ascendant who died before 1 August 2007 and one of the individual's own parents was also born in Malta. Maltese citizenship can be continually transmitted through each generation born abroad provided that each subsequent generation is registered for citizenship. Individuals who were unable to claim citizenship before their qualifying parent's death are exceptionally eligible to register if their parent's death was before 1 August 2010.

Under the citizenship provisions of the Constitution at the time of independence, a CUKC born abroad became a Maltese citizen only if their father and a paternal grandparent were born in Malta. The 2007 amendment extended citizenship to former CUKCs born overseas with a Maltese-born mother and maternal grandparent.

=== European integration ===
Malta joined the European Union as part of the EU's 2004 enlargement. Maltese citizens have since been able to live and work in other EU and EFTA countries under free movement rights established by the 1992 Maastricht Treaty and participated in their first European Parliament elections in 2004. The scope of these rights includes the entire European Economic Area (EEA), encompassing all EU and EFTA member states other than Switzerland, which concluded a separate free movement agreement with the EU that came into force in 2002. Liechtenstein exceptionally maintains immigration controls on EEA and Swiss citizens despite its EEA membership due to the country's small geographic area and population.

Before the UK's withdrawal from the EU in 2020, Maltese citizens held a particularly favoured status in the UK. While non-EU Commonwealth citizens continued to need a residence visa to live in the UK, Maltese citizens were able to settle there and immediately hold full rights to political participation due to their status as both Commonwealth and EU citizens. Maltese citizens (along with Irish and Cypriot citizens) domiciled in the UK were able to vote in the 2016 United Kingdom European Union membership referendum while all other non-British EU citizens could not. Although EU citizens no longer have freedom of movement in the UK since 2021, Maltese citizens remain Commonwealth citizens under British law and continue to be eligible to vote and stand for public office in the UK if domiciled there.

=== Citizenship by investment ===
Amendments to the Maltese Citizenship Act in 2013 allowed for the creation of the Individual Investor Programme, through which foreign citizens could make a substantial capital investment in return for Maltese citizenship for themselves and their dependants. The original proposal for this programme required a base €650,000 donation to the state, an additional €25,000 for spouses and each minor child, and a further €50,000 for each dependent parent over 55 and for each unmarried child aged 18 to 25.

In response to domestic criticism, the government amended the programme to require an additional €150,000 investment in bonds, stocks, or other approved financial assets held for at least five years. Applicants were also required to make a real estate purchase valued at a minimum of €350,000 or lease a residence with a minimum annual rent of €16,000. The total number of successful primary applicants would be limited to 1,800 people and the names of every person acquiring citizenship under the programme would be published. Of the donated funds, 70 per cent would be allotted to a National Development and Social Fund that would only be used for public works and services development.

Further criticism by the European Commission led the government to add a 12-month residence requirement before applicants could be naturalised. Until 2020, this naturalisation pathway was not directly run by a Maltese government ministry and was instead operated by Henley & Partners, a consultancy firm that assists private clients with immigration and citizenship law. The firm earned €36.8 million in commissions for operating this programme from 2014 to 2020.

The European Commission has repeatedly condemned this citizenship pathway for the high risk of money laundering, tax evasion, and corruption it enables. In a 2019 report on citizenship by investment programmes in the EU, the Commission found that the government's implementation of this citizenship pathway lacked sufficient checks on an applicant's background, did not monitor their financial activities to prevent tax evasion, and required further due diligence to trace the origin of funds to prevent money laundering.

Despite requests by the European Commission to cease approving naturalisations by investment, the Maltese government renewed the scheme in 2020 with raised capital requirements after the original programme approached its 1,800-person limit. Applicants making a €600,000 donation are subject to a 36-month residence requirement while those contributing €750,000 continue to be subject to a 12-month period. All qualifying dependants (including unmarried children of the principal applicant under age 29 and parents or grandparents over age 55) require a further €50,000 donation per person regardless of age. Property purchases are required to be valued at a minimum of €700,000, and an additional contribution of €10,000 must be donated to a registered charitable organisation.

A 2021 documents leak revealed a series of letters of intent presented to the Maltese government by applicants to this pathway that detailed how they planned to establish ties to Malta; applicants on average committed to being physically present in the country for about 16 days, significantly less than the residence period nominally required by legislation. Over €1.4 billion has been contributed to the programme since 2015.

Following the start of the Russian invasion of Ukraine in 2022, applications from investors based in Russia and Belarus were indefinitely suspended. Seven individuals sanctioned by the European Union and other Western countries have been able to partially circumvent those sanctions with Maltese citizenship obtained through the investment programme prior to the invasion.

In 2025, the European Court of Justice ruled in European Commission v Republic of Malta that the citizenship by investment pathway violated the integrity of EU citizenship and the principle of sincere cooperation under Union law, specifically Articles 4(3) and 20 of the Treaty on the Functioning of the European Union. The Court ruled against Malta despite a 2024 judicial opinion by ECJ Advocate General Anthony Collins, who had stated that the Commission failed to demonstrate that EU law required a "genuine link" between a person and a member state. Following the ECJ ruling, Parliament abolished the investment pathway in July 2025 and replaced it with a discretionary route under which the government may grant citizenship to people judged to have made an exceptional contribution to Malta.

== Acquisition and loss of citizenship ==
=== Entitlement by birth, descent, or adoption ===
All persons born in Malta between 21 September 1964 and 1 August 1989 automatically received citizenship at birth regardless of the nationalities of their parents. Individuals born in the country since then receive Maltese citizenship at birth if at least one parent is a citizen or was born in Malta. Children born overseas are Maltese citizens by descent if either parent is a Maltese citizen. Adopted children under the age of 10 are automatically granted citizenship at the time of adoption.

Abandoned children found in the country are presumed to have been born in Malta and are considered Maltese citizens by birth until their eligibility for another citizenship can be established. Stateless persons who were born in Malta and have never held another citizenship are entitled to naturalisation after living in Malta for five years, while those born abroad who have at least one Maltese parent may naturalise after three years of residence.

=== Voluntary acquisition ===
Foreigners may naturalise as Maltese citizens after residing in the country for at least four of the previous seven years. Applicants must demonstrate proficiency in Maltese or English and fulfil a good character requirement. Although the legislation imposes no such criterion, immigration officials typically only naturalise persons with Maltese ancestry or those who have been resident in the country for a substantial period and have had children born in Malta. Individuals domiciled in the country with a grandfather and great-grandfather born in Malta may naturalise with no minimum residence period.

Noncitizens who are married to Maltese citizens may acquire citizenship by registration after five years of marriage and cohabitation. If a noncitizen spouse is widowed before the five-year period is complete, citizenship can still be acquired after what would have been the fifth year of marriage, provided that the couple was living together at the time of the Maltese spouse's death. This five-year waiting period was introduced in 2000 due to concerns over frequent marriages of convenience. The residence requirement may be waived entirely if either spouse performs an exceptional act of service for the country.

Former citizens who lost Maltese citizenship before 2000 through emigration or earlier restrictions on multiple citizenship may regain it by registration if they were not eligible for automatic reacquisition. Individuals born abroad before 1 August 1989 to a Maltese mother may also become citizens by registration with no additional requirements.

While the numbers of people acquiring citizenship by naturalisation and by registration were both consistently low during the 1990s, averaging above 100 per year, the change in dual citizenship policy in 2000 led to a sharp increase in registrations. In 2001, 1,062 people registered for Maltese citizenship. Though annual registrations fell to around 500 per year over the rest of the 2000s, the extension of citizenship eligibility to more generations of Maltese born abroad contributed to a further increase in registrations. In the early 2010s, just under 1,000 people per year acquired citizenship by registration.

=== Relinquishment and deprivation ===
Maltese citizenship can be relinquished by making a declaration of renunciation, provided that the declarant already possesses another nationality. Renunciations cannot be made during wartime and are subject to final approval by the Minister of Home Affairs. Citizenship may be involuntarily removed from naturalised or registered persons who fraudulently acquired the status, committed an act of disloyalty against the state, aided an enemy nation with which Malta is at war, were sentenced to incarceration for longer than 12 months within seven years of acquiring citizenship, or resided overseas for a continuous period of seven years without registering their intention to retain Maltese citizenship. The last ground does not apply to persons employed in the civil service or in a supranational organisation of which Malta is a member.

== See also ==
- Emigration from Malta
- Immigration to Malta
- Visa policy of the Schengen Area
- Visa requirements for Maltese citizens
