= Ramona Depares =

Maltese author and journalist

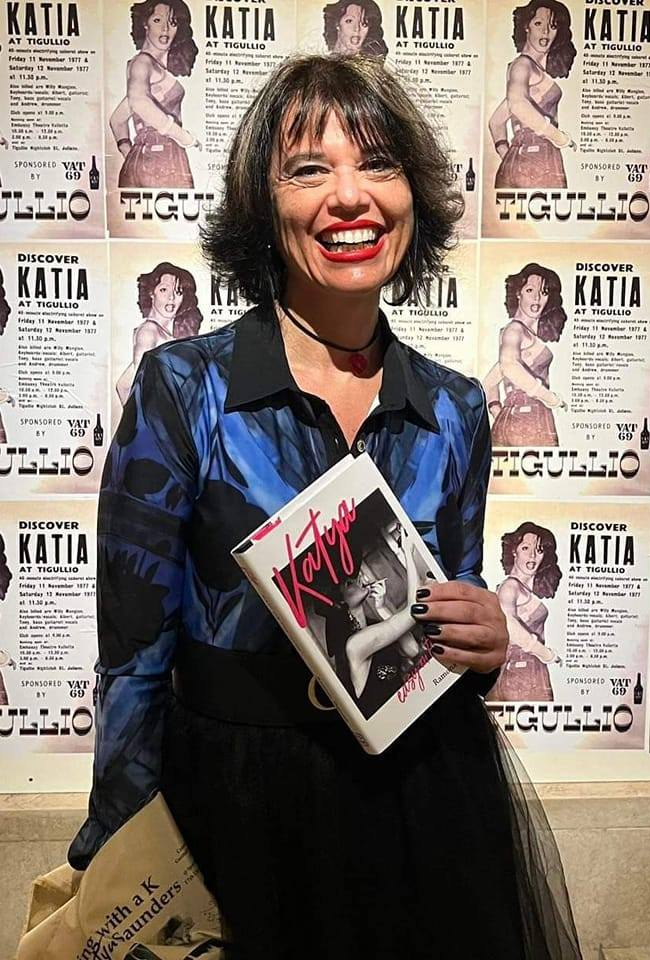
- Depares in 2024
- Born: July 24, 1975 (age 51); Valletta, Malta
- Education: University of Malta
- Occupations: Journalist, author, editor
- Writing career
- Years active: 1999 - present
- Subjects: Biography, journalism, essays
- Website: ramonadepares.com

Ramona Depares (born July 24, 1975) is a Maltese author, journalist and theatre critic. She previously worked at the Times of Malta, and is now a freelance journalist and creative writer.

== Career ==
She obtained a degree in law from the University of Malta in 1999.

Depares began working as a freelancer for the Times of Malta in the 1990s. After graduating from university, she joined the paper as a legal reporter. She took on the role of executive editor of the in-house magazine E&D in 2007. In 2011, she joined the paper's editorial staff in a full-time capacity, and in 2019, she became Head of News. She also served as "assistant editor with The Sunday Times of Malta and editor of the monthly Sunday Circle magazine".

Depares left the Times in 2019 to launch her website, which specialises in culture related features and reviews. She is a theatre critic and runs an SEO content-writing project while working on new creative writing projects.

She is the editor of Encore Arts & Culture Magazine and of Horeca Malta, a magazine dedicated to the hotels, restaurants and catering industry.

=== Writing ===
Her short story collection Beltin: Stejjer Minn Nies Minsija was published in 2019. The stories focus on the grassroots community of Valletta from the 1970s to the 1990s, based on the author's recollections and the memories of her friends and family. The book is illustrated by artist Moira Zahra. It was partially financed by the National Book Council. The book is part of the Malta Book Council's foreign rights catalogue and was lauded by veteran author Trevor Żahra for "keeping Valletta alive".

She published a second short story collection, The Patient in Hospital Zero, in 2021. The collection is "concerned with human nature, particularly its darker undertones". The main protagonist of the work are women, a conscious choice made by Depares because women are rarely presented as antiheroes.

Depares has also written an authorized biography of Katya Saunders, one of Malta's first openly transgender women. The book, entitled Katya: Easy on the Tonic, was described as an "important documentation of the life of a woman who is viewed as a role model for an entire generation".

== Personal life ==
Depares was born and raised in Valletta.

Depares underwent a hysterectomy at age 45, and has spoken on the need for increased education on recovery from hysterectomies and other similar procedures. She has chosen not to have children.

== Awards ==
- 2014 Opinion Article Award, conferred by the Institute of Maltese Journalists
- 2015 Cultural Journalism Award, conferred by the Institute of Maltese Journalists
- 2023 Best International Contribution Premju Għall-Arti 2023, as part of the group project Urban Fabric
- 2025 Best in Arts & Culture Journalism, conferred by the Institute of Maltese Journalists

== Publications ==
- Beltin: Stejjer Minn Nies Minsija. Merlin Publishers. 2019. ISBN 978-99909-1841-0.
- The Patient in Hospital Zero. Merlin Publishers. 2021. ISBN 978-99909-1932-5.
- Katya: Easy on the Tonic. MGRM. ISBN 978-9918-0-0380-8.
