= List of films shot in Malta =

This is a list of films shot in Malta.

Year	Movie Title	Shot Location		
2025	Jurassic World: Rebirth	UK, Thailand & Malta Film Studios, St. Rocco Street, Kalkara, Malta		
2025	Last Breath	Scotland, UK and Malta		
2025	Ex Ex Lovers	Valletta, Malta		
2024	K3 en het lied van de zeemeermin	Ramla Bay, Għar Lapsi, Villa Bologna		
2024	Gladiator II	Fort Ricasoli, Kalkara, Malta		
2024	No Woman is an Island	Qormi, St Paul's Bay, University of Malta, Valletta		
2024	Borderline	Paola, Malta		
2024	Classified	Mdina, St Paul's Cathedral, Mdina, The Quad Mriehel, Valletta, Marsaxlokk		
2023	Deep Fear			
2023	Napoleon	Fort Ricasoli		
2023	Last Voyage of the Demeter	Malta Film Studios		
2023	Sniper: G.R.I.T. - Global Response & Intelligence Team	Paola		
2023	Ikariya			
2023	Prizefighter: The Life of Jem Belcher			
2023	The Way of the Wind			
2023	Sposa in rosso	Senglea BORMLA		
2023	The Dive			
2023	Sisi & I			
2022	Machination	Mgarr, Malta		
2022	Cats of Malta	Valetta, St Julians, Paola, Naxxar, St Paul's Bay,		
2022	Hounds of War			
2022	Jurassic World Dominion	Valletta, Mellieha, Vittoriosa, Pembroke		
2022	Warrior			
2022	Shark Bait	Marfa Bay, Gharmier Bay, Malta Film Studios		
2022	Accident Man 2	Senglea, VallettaBormla		
2021	Carmen (2021 film)	Valletta		
2021	Mix Up in the Mediterranean	Valletta		
2021	Firebird			
2021	Mikha'El	Town Square, Safi		
2021	Just Noise	Senglea, VallettaBORMLA TRIQ IL Gendus u bonnici market square		
2021	The Obscure Life of the Grand Duke of Corsica			
2021	The Seed			
2020	Rose Island	Malta Film Studios		
2020	Tolo Tolo			
2019	Made in Malta			
2019	Bharat			
2018	The Boat	Malta Film Studios		
2018	7 Days in Entebbe			
2018	Paul, Apostle of Christ			
2018	Thugs of Hindostan	Malta Film Studios		
2018	Divine Beauty	Parish Church of the Assumption, Mosta; Basilica of Saint George, Victoria, Gozo; Xghajra Parish Catholic Church, Xghajra		
2017	American Assassin	Valletta, Customs House, Fort St Elmo, Grand Harbour		
2017	Murder on the Orient Express	Valletta		
2017	Love to Paradise			
2017	Papillon			
2017	Renegades			
2016	Debarquement Immediat	Cospicua, Vittoriosa		
2016	The Promise	Grand Harbour, Valletta, Fort Saint Elmo, Valletta		
2016	13 Hours: The Secret Soldiers of Benghazi	Ta' Qali, Malta International Airport, Valletta, Attard, Fort Saint Elmo, Valletta, Grandmaster's Palace, Valletta, Kordin, Manoel Island		
2016	Risen			
2016	Assassin's Creed	Fort Manoel, Fort Ricasoli, Fort Delimara, Basilica of Christ the King, Paola, Valletta, Floriana, Basilica of St Dominic, Valletta, Valletta Ditch, Valletta		
2015	By the Sea	Mġarr ix-Xini		
2015	Andron			
2015	Friend or Foe			
2015	Mega Mindy Versus ROX			
2014	Saul: The Journey to Damascus			
2014	The Whale			
2013	Adormidera			
2013	Pirate Pete			
2013	Captain Phillips	Malta Freeport, Birzebbugia, Malta Film Studios		
2013	World War Z	Fort St Elmo, Valletta, Mqabba, Ordinance St, Valletta, Hamrun, Floriana, Tritons Fountain, Valletta, Valletta, Waterfront, Valletta		
2012	Asterix et Obelix: Au service de Sa Majeste			
2012	Kon-Tiki	Malta Film Studios		
2012	Die Manner der Emden			
2011	Le Cochon de Gaza			
2011	Wickie auf großer Fahrt			
2011	Conan the Barbarian	Blue Grotto		
2010	Vinnaithaandi Varuvaayaa	Kalkara, St Publius Parish Church, St Paul's Cathedral, Mdina, Msida, Azure Window, Our Lady of Loreto Parish Church, Popeye Village		
2011	The Devil's Double	Fort Ricasoli, Kalkara, Grand Harbour Hotel, Valletta, Grand Harbour, Valletta, Grand Hotel Excelsior, Floriana, Great Siege Rd, Floriana, Hilton Hotel, St Julians, Liesse Il-Belt, Valletta, Mosta Bridge, Mosta, Radisson Blu Resort and Spa, Golden Sands, Mellieha, Triq San Gwann, Valletta		
2009	Agora	Fort Ricasoli, Kalkara, Valletta Ditch, St. Michael's Bastion, Valletta		
2009	Wickie und die Starken Manner			
2008	U-900			
2008	A Previous Engagement			
2008	Nie kłam, kochanie			
2008	Novaya Zemlya			
2008	Nepobedimmy			
2007	Runaway Horse			
2007	Eichmann	Liesse Il-Belt, Valletta, Old Theatre St, Valletta, Victoria Gate, Valletta		
2007	Pars: Kiraz Operasyonu			
2007	Largo Winch			
2007	Lost Treasure of the Knights Templar			
2007	Sommer			
2006	The Da Vinci Code			
2006	Open Water 2: Adrift			
2006	Ghost Boat	Valletta, Sliema, Wied Iz-Zurrieq		
2005	Munich	Valletta, Sliema, Buġibba, Marsaxlokk, Cospicua (Bormla - Dock No.1), Marsa, Malta International Airport, Cospicua, Rabat, Malta, Republic Square, Valletta, Liesse Il-Belt, Valletta, British Hotel, Valletta, Primera Hotel, Bugibba		
2004	A Different Loyalty	Fort St Elmo, Valletta, Liesse Il-Belt, Valletta, Triq San Gwann, Valletta, Valletta		
2004	Troy	Fort Ricasoli, Mellieħa, Blue Lagoon (Comino)		
2004	Alexander			
2003	The League of Extraordinary Gentlemen			
2003	The Death of Klinghoffer			
2002	The Count of Monte Cristo	Azure Window (Gozo), St. Mary's Tower (Comino), Blue Grotto, Comino Caves, Comino Island, Elephant Rock, Comino Island, Grand Harbour, Valletta, Grandmaster's Palace, Valletta, Mdina, Vittoriosa		
2002	Astérix & Obélix: Mission Cléopâtre			
2002	Swept Away	Blue Lagoon (Comino), Xatt ir-Rizq (Vittoriosa), Xara Palace Hotel (Mdina), Vittoriosa		
2002	Pinocchio	Kalkara		
2001	The Emperor's new Clothes			
2001	Revelation	Bastion, Mdina, Blue Lagoon, Comino Island, Church of St Dominic and The Blessed Virgin, Rabat, Church of St Roch, Comino Island, Grandmaster's Palace, Marsaxlokk, Mdina, Mnajdra Temples, St John's Co Cathedral, Upper Barrakka Gardens		
2000	U-571	Mediterranean Film Studios, Grand Harbour, St. Paul's Bay		
2000	Gladiator	Fort Ricasoli, Couvre Port (Vittoriosa)		
1996	Merisairas			
1996	White Squall			
1995	Cutthroat Island	Blue Grotto, Fort Ricasoli, Kalkara, Fort St Elmo, Valletta, Hasan's Cave, Kalafrana, Mdina, Vittoriosa		
1994	Casque bleu			
1993	Voyage			
1992	Christopher Columbus: The Discovery	-	1991	The Burning Shore
1990	Les 1001 Nuits			
1990	Der Skipper			
1989	Erik the Viking			
1989	Leviathan			
1988	Black Eagle	Valletta, Għajn Tuffieħa, Mdina, Blue Grotto, Dry Docks, Cospicua, Fort Ricasoli, Grandmaster's Palace, Herbert Ganado Gardens, Malta International Airport, Manoel Island, Marsamxett Harbour, Rabat, Senglea, Sliema, St John's Co Cathedral, Upper Barrakka Gardens, Vittoriosa		
1987	Iron Warrior	Blue Grotto, Dingli Cliff, Fort Ricasoli, Ghar Dalam, Birzebbugia, Gozo, Grandmaster's Palace, Mnajdra Temples, Popeye Village, Anchor Bay, Selmun, St. Paul's Catacombs, Rabat		
1986	Pirates			
1985	Les Loups entre Eux	Grand Harbour, Fort St Elmo, Valletta, Għajn Tuffieħa		
1985	Final Justice	Blue Lagoon, Comino Island, Grand Harbour, Grandmaster's Palace, Malta International Airport, Manoel Island, Republic St, Strait St, Upper Barrakka Gardens, Valletta		
1984	Der Scheenman			
1983	Trenchcoat	Malta International Airport, St. John's Co-Cathedral, "il-Monti" market (Valletta), Mdina, Floriana, Ghajn Tuffieha Tower, Ghajn Tuffieha Bay, Grand Harbour, Grandmaster's Palace, Marfa Ridge, Red Tower, Marfa, Marsamxett Harbour, Mnajdra Temples, Mosta, Valletta, Verdala Palace, Buskett, Vittoriosa		
1982	Samraat			
1981	L'ultimo squalo			
1981	Inseminoid			
1981	Clash of the Titans	Azure Window, Dwejra, Gozo, Fort St Elmo, Fungus Rock, Dwejra, Gozo, Valletta		
1980	Popeye	Popeye Village, Blue grotto, Mellieħa		
1980	Raise the Titanic	Mediterranean Film Studios		
1978	Warlords of Atlantis			
1978	Sweeney 2	Crocodile Rock, Gozo, Gozo, Malta International Airport, Ta' Cenc Hotel, Gozo		
1978	Force 10 from Navarone			
1978	Midnight Express	Fort St Elmo, Valletta, Malta International Airport, Republic St, Valletta, St Dominic's Priory, Rabat, St Elmo Place, Valletta		
1977	Orca			
1977	Sinbad and the Eye of the Tiger			
1977	The Spy Who Loved Me			
1976	Shout at the Devil	St. Paul's Bay, Auberge de Castille, Valletta, Imperial Hotel, Sliema, Parish Church, Tarxien, Upper Barrakka Gardens, Valletta		
1976	Charas			
1975	Il lupo dei Mari			
1975	Children of Rage			
1974	L'Invenzione di Morel			
1974	Voir Malte et Mourir			
1974	The Golden Voyage of Sinbad			
1973	The Mackintosh Man	Customs House, Valletta, Lower Barrakka Gardens, Valletta, Marsaxlokk		
1972	Pulp	Balluta Buildings, St Julians, Floriana, Grand Harbour, Hagar Qim, Marsa Creek, Mtarfa, Palazzo Parisio, Naxxar, Parish Church of Mellieha, Mellieha, Rabat (Victoria), Gozo, Ramla Bay, Gozo, Salini Road, Bahar ic-Caghaq, St Pauls Square, Mdina, Verdala Palace, Buskett, Vilhena Palace, Mdina		
1971	Murphy's War			
1971	When Eight Bells Toll			
1971	Zeppelin	Delimara Point, Delimara		
1970	Hell Boats	Blue Grotto, Delimara Point, Delimara, Fort Manoel, Fort St Rocco, Grand Harbour, Manoel Island, Marsamxett Harbour, Upper Barrakka Gardens, Wied Babu, Zurrieq, Wied iz-Zurrieq, Qrendi		
1970	Mister Jerico	Floriana, Gnejna Bay Beach, Liesse Il-Belt, Valletta, Malta International Airport, Hotel Phoenicia, Sliema Creek, Triq San Gwann, Valletta, Verdala Palace, Buskett, Victoria Gate, Valletta		
	Eyewitness	Auberge de Castille, Valletta, Barrakka Lift, Valletta, Customs House, Valletta, Delimara Point, Delimara, Dingli Cliffs, Grand Harbour, Independence Square, Mdina, Salt Pans, Delimara, St John's Square, Valletta, St. Paul's Catacombs, Rabat, Ta' Xbiex, Gzira, Upper Barrakka Gardens, Valletta		
1970	Adventures of Gerrard			
1969	Can Heironymus Merkin Ever Forget Mercy Humppe and Find True Happiness?			
1969	Vendetta for the Saint	Addolorata Cemetery, Paola, Church of The Nativity of Mary, Naxxar, Grand Harbour, Madliena Bridge, Hal Gharghur, Madliena Valley, Hal Gharghur, Malta International Airport, Marsaxlokk, Mdina, Mellieha, Palazzo Parisio, Naxxar, Parish Church of Mellieha, Mellieha, Verdala Palace, Buskett, Wignacourt Tower, St Paul's Bay		
1969	Battle of Britain			
1968	A Twist of Sand	Barrakka Lift, Valletta, Delimara Point, Delimara, Grand Harbour, Upper Barrakka Gardens		
1967	Casino Royale			
1966	Death Is a Woman	Blue Lagoon, Comino Island, Cathedral of the Assumption, Victoria, Gozo, Malta International Airport, Mgarr Harbour, Gozo, Pjazza l-Indipendenza, Gozo		
1965	The Bedford Incident	Rinella Movie Park		
1963	Treasure in Malta			
1958	The Silent Enemy			
1956	The Baby and the Battleship			
1956	The Battle of the River Plate	Grand Harbour, Marsaxlokk Bay, Mgarr Harbour, Gozo		
1953	Single Handed			
1953	Malta Story	Airfield, Kalafrana, Auberge de Castille, Valletta, Dry Docks, Cospicua, Grand Harbour, Grandmaster's Palace, Imgiebah Bay, Lascaris War Rooms, Mdina, Mnajdra Temples, Mosta, Senglea, Sliema, St Paul's Street, Valletta, Upper Barrakka Gardens, Valletta, Valletta City Gate, Valletta, Valletta Ditch, St. Michael's Bastion, Valletta		
1953	They Who Dare			
1931	Tell England			
1928	Bolibar			
1927	The Battles of Coronel and Falkland Islands			
1925	Sons of the Seas			

== See also ==
- List of films set in Malta
- List of Maltese films
