= Cinema of Malta =

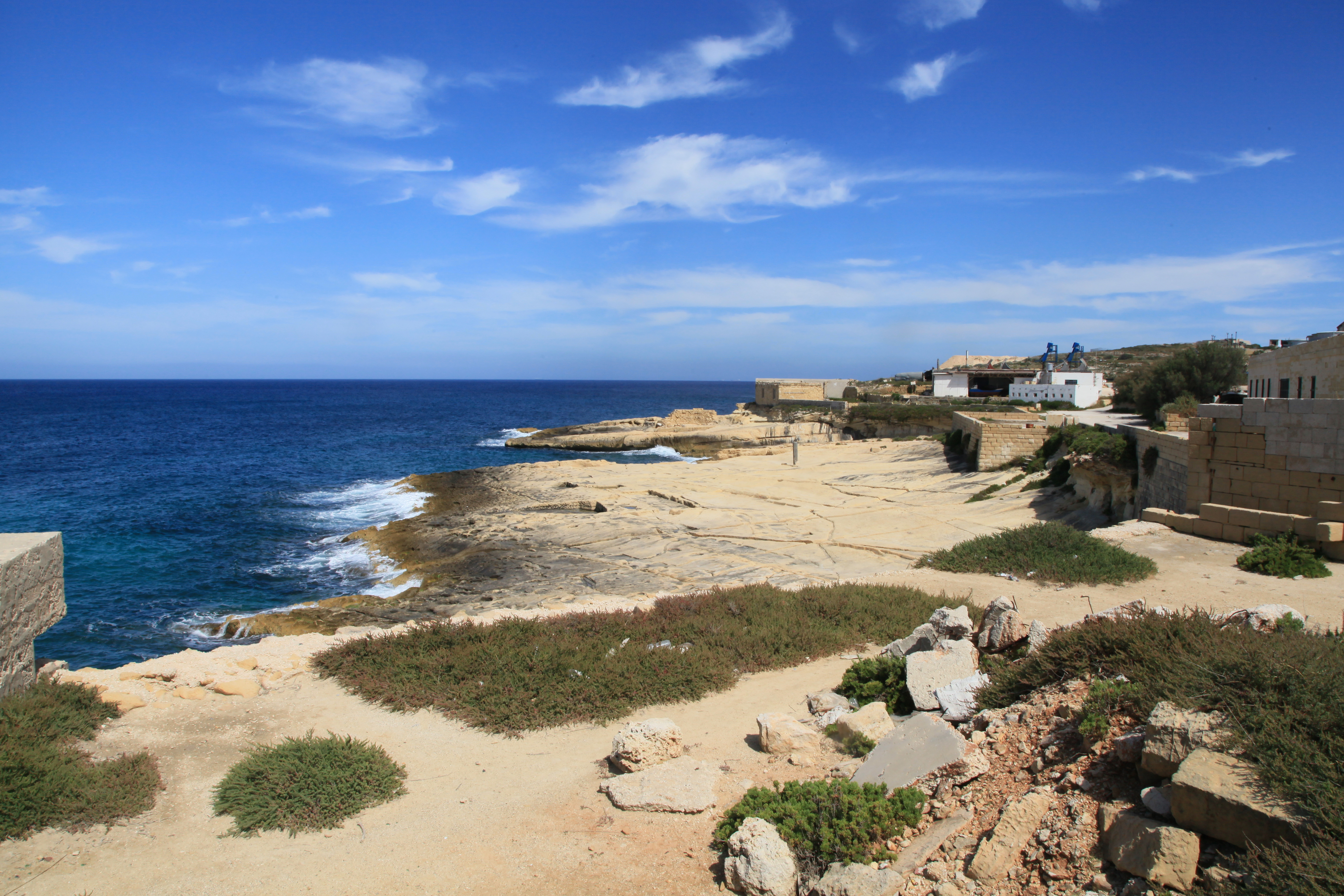
Mediterranean Film Studios in Kalkara, Malta.

The film industry of Malta consists primarily of location shooting for larger foreign productions. The Maltese landscape has portrayed several regions of the world, and the Maltese government provides incentives for foreign productions to operate in Malta. The prevalence of location shooting in the country has created a large film tourism industry. Malta has also had a limited number of local productions of Maltese films.

== Maltese film ==
As a microstate, few local productions have taken place in Malta. Gaġġa was the first film to be produced from an entirely Maltese script, produced as a student film in 1971 and released in 2007 due to its cultural significance. In 2014, Simshar became the feature length Maltese film distributed to an international audience. Simshar was selected to represent Maltese cinema in the Academy Award for Best Foreign Film. Since then, other internationally distributed feature films, such as The Boat, have been produced in Malta. Carmen, a Canadian/Maltese co-production, won the award for best feature film in the 2022 Canadian Film Festival.

== Film servicing ==
The Maltese landscape and government incentives for foreign productions have both been credited for the development of the Maltese film industry. Malta first began hosting and servicing foreign productions as early as the 1920s. Malta Film Studios was established in 1964 to facilitate water-based film projects by using a large water tank adjacent to the horizon, and the studio eventually came to be operated by the Maltese government. A second tank was made for the 1980 film Raise the Titanic. In 1999, the Malta Film Commission was established to support the Maltese film servicing industry. Malta began offering cash rebates for local expenditures to film crews in the country in 2005. Several high-profile productions have filmed in Malta, including Gladiator, Munich, Assassin's Creed, and Murder on the Orient Express. Malta is also home to the Kinemastik film festival.

The variety of landscapes in Malta allows it to serve as an alternative production location for several countries. Valletta, the capital of Malta, has been used to portray Israel in World War Z, Turkey in Midnight Express, and Peru in Kon-Tiki, among other locations. Maltese architecture has also allowed productions to use the country for projects set in Rome, such as Munich and Gladiator, or projects set in the 18th and 19th centuries, such as The Count of Monte Cristo. Malta is a common filming location for epics, such as Troy, Agora, and Game of Thrones.

Malta's prominence as a filming location has resulted in significant film tourism. As tourism makes up a significant component of Malta's economy, this has brought significant economic benefits for the country. Following the production of Popeye, the village constructed for the film was converted into the Popeye Village amusement park. Other popular film tourist destinations in Malta include several forts and beaches were major productions were filmed, as well as the facilities of the Mediterranean Film Studios.

== See also ==
- List of films shot in Malta
- List of Maltese films
