= List of films set in Malta =

The Mediterranean Island of Malta has been featured in the following films:

- 1942 - Malta G.C. (documentary, narrated by Laurence Olivier)
- 1953 - Malta Story
- 1970 - Hell Boats
- 1973 - The Mackintosh Man
- 1976 - Charas (1976 film)
- 1980- Popeye (film)
- 1983 - Trenchcoat
- 1985 - Final Justice
- 2005 - Angli: The Movie
- 2007 - Bawxatti - Il-Ħarba
- 2007 - Qerq
- 2007 - Youth Without Youth
- 2008 - Anno Domani XXXIII
- 2008 - Operation White Dove
- 2013 - World War Z
- 2017 - Love to Paradise
- 2018 - Divine Beauty (Award-winning - Independent Shorts Awards)
- 2019 - Made in Malta
- 2021 - Luzzu
- 2021 - Carmen
- 2023 - Shame on Dry Land
- 2025 - Ex Ex Lovers

== See also ==
- List of films shot in Malta
- List of Maltese films
