= List of Maltese films =

This is a list of films produced or shot on location in Malta.

While Malta has produced only a few films, the island has been a common location for filming ancient historical epic films such as Gladiator and Troy.

== Maltese films ==
=== A ===
- Against All Odds: The Quest for Malta (2004) (TV)
- Angli: The Movie (2005)
- Adormidera (2013)
- America's Woman (2024) - Premiered at TCL Chinese Theaters, Hollywood. Winner of 24 awards, screened across 5 continents.
- Aurora (2017) - Gold Prize, 1st Tsiolkovsky International Space FF; 2nd Prize, 2018 China International Contest of Popular Science Works

=== B ===
- Blin (2004)
- Brothers From Malta (2022)

Boomering

=== C ===
- The Call (2012)
- Carmen (2021)
- Cats of Malta (2023)
- Ciao Ciao (2025)

=== D ===
- Daqqet ix-Xita (2010)
- Divine Beauty (2018) - Honorable Mention (Best Doc Short), 2018 Independent Shorts Awards.

=== E ===
- Earth's Beauty (2018) - Best Music, 2018 Top Indie Film Awards. Accepted into ESA's official archives.

=== G ===
- Gaġġa (1971)
- Genesis (2001)
- A Gentleman from Malta (1997) (TV)
- Ghanja lill-Omm 2006 (2006) (TV)
- A Gozitan Tale (1997) (TV)

=== I ===
- Il-Messija (2009) (Cinema) by Flash Productions
- The Isle (2004)
- Iz-Zonqri (1986) - the first Maltese movie released for the local video rentals
- Il-Misteru ta' L-Għoġol tad-deheb (2017)
- In Corpore (2020)

=== K ===
- Katarin (1977)
- Kesil (2018) - Accepted into ESA's official archives.
- Klassi Ghalina & The History of the World (2018)
- Kont Diġa (2009)

=== L ===
- L'Amour de Dieu (2018) - Accepted into ESA's official archives.
- Limestone Cowboy (2016)
- Love to Paradise (2017)
- Lux et Tenebrae (2018) - Best Doc Short, 2018 Top Indie Film Awards. Accepted into ESA's official archives.
- Luzzu (2021)

=== M ===
- Mera tal-Passat (2004)
- Malta George Cross (2005) (video)
- Machination (2022)
- Maltageddon (2009) - Maltese blockbuster cinema box office record
- Maltaforce cinema (2010)
- Medic (2011) - short film; New York Award
- Materre (2017) - Gold Prize, 1st Tsiolkovsky International Space Film Festival; 1st Prize, 2018 China International Contest of Popular Science Works
- Made in Malta (2019)
- Mikha'El (2021) - Winner of 15 awards, screened across 6 continents.

=== O ===
- On n'a qu'une vie (2000)
- One Fine Day (1997)

=== P ===
- Pawlu ta' Tarsu (2008)
- Phobia (2015)
- Pillars of Creation (2018) - Gold Prize, 1st Tsiolkovsky International Space Film Festival. Accepted into ESA's official archives.
- A Pinch of Salt (2003)
- A Previous Engagement (2005)
- Profile of a Director (1998)
- Punch's Journey (2026) - Premiered at Hollywood's TCL Chinese Theaters. Winner of multiple Best Short, Best Director, Best Original Score awards.

=== Q ===
- Qerq (2007) - cinema blockbuster box office record

=== R ===
- Red Glory (2018) - Winner of 8 awards including Gold Prize, 1st Tsiolkovsky International Space Film Festival.

=== S ===
- Simshar (2014)
- Santa Monika (film) (2009)

=== T ===
- TeleKabul I (2004)
- TeleKabul II (2006)
- Tal-Qadi Stone (2007)

=== V-W ===
- Voyage (1992)
- Whispers From the Core (2025) - Hollywood premiere at TCL Chinese Theaters. Won Best International Experimental Film, MEIFF; Awards of Merit / Recognition for Original Score and Experimental Film, The IndieFest Awards.

== Films shot in Malta ==
- Agora (2009)
- The Battle of the River Plate (1956)
- Biotch (by Z.F)
- Black Eagle (1988)
- By the Sea (2015)
- Casino Royale (1967)
- Children of Rage (1975)
- Christopher Columbus: The Discovery (1992)
- Clash of the Titans (1981)
- The Count of Monte Cristo (2002)
- Cutthroat Island (1995)
- The Da Vinci Code (2006)
- David Copperfield (1969)
- A Different Loyalty (2004)
- Divine Beauty (2018)
- The Emperor's New Clothes (2001)
- The Fifth Missile (1986)
- Final Justice (1985)
- Gladiator (2000)
- Inseminoid (1981)
- Jesus (1999)
- The League of Extraordinary Gentlemen (2003)
- Leviathan (1989)
- The Mackintosh Man (1973)
- Malta Story (1953)
- Midnight Express (1978)
- Mikha'El (2021)
- Munich (2005)
- Murphy's War (1971)
- Never Say Never Again (1983)
- Open Water 2: Adrift (2006)
- Orca (1977)
- Pinocchio (2002)
- Pirates (1986)
- Popeye (1980)
- Pulp (1972)
- Raise the Titanic! (1976)
- Revelation (2001)
- Shout at the Devil (film) (1976)
- The Sign of the Four (1987)
- Sinbad and the Eye of the Tiger (1977)
- The Spy Who Loved Me (1977)
- Swept Away (2002)
- Treasure in Malta (1963)
- Trenchcoat (1983)
- Troy (2004)
- A Twist of Sand (1967)
- U-571 (2000)
- The Voyage (1992)
- Warlords of Atlantis (1978)
- White Squall (1996)
- World War Z (2013)
