= KRS =

KRS may refer to:

- Kadet Remaja Sekolah, a youth organisation in Malaysia
- Kentucky Revised Statutes, US
- Kinross-shire, historic county in Scotland, Chapman code
- National Council of the Judiciary (Poland) (Krajowa Rada Sądownictwa), a Polish constitutional organ nominating judges
- Krishna Raja Sagara, a lake and dam, India
- Kristiansand Airport, Kjevik, IATA airport code
- KRS-One (b. 1965), Lawrence Krisna Parker, American hip-hop musician
- KRS Film Distributors (Malta)
- HC Kunlun Red Star, Chinese hockey club
- Kill Rock Stars, American independent record label
