= Malta Film Awards =

Film Awards hosted in Malta in 2022

2022 Malta Film Awards
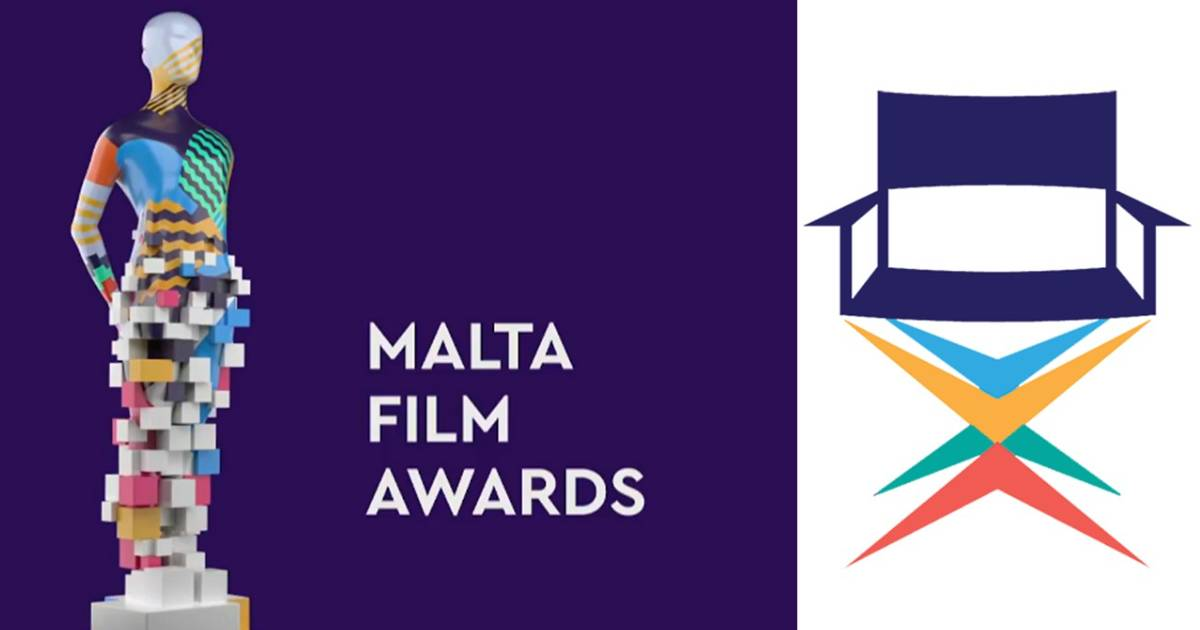
- Date: 29 January 2022
- Hosted by: David Walliams
- Organized by: Malta Film Commission
- Official website: https://maltafilmawards.com

Highlights
- Best Film: The Boat
- Best Television show: L-Għarusa
- Best Actor: Harvey Keitel
- Best Actress: Louise Doneo

Television coverage
- Channel: Television Malta
- Duration: 1:30:00

The Malta Film Awards were a group of television and film awards given to nominated media. They were hosted by the Malta Film Commission in the Mediterranean Conference Centre in Valletta, Malta. The event occurred on 29 January 2022 following a 'Malta Film Week'. This 'Film Week' included conferences, masterclasses and panel discussions. The Film Awards were hosted by writer David Walliams.

== Awards ==
Best Actor in a Leading Role	Harvey Keitel
Best Actress in a Leading Role	Louise Doneo
Best Male Actor in a Supporting Role	Narcy Calamatta
Best Female Actor in a Supporting Role	Sarah Camilleri
Best Director	Davide Ferrario
Best Film	The Boat
Best Cinematography	Marek Traskowski
Best Post-Production	Blood on the Crown
Crew Recognition Award	Ino Bonello
Best Costume Design	Angelle Farrugia & Audrey Brincat Dalli
Best Hair and Makeup Design	Christian Kotey & Jannie Stax
Best Location Award	Fort Ricasoli
Best Production Design	Mela Melak
Best Musical Score	Alexey Shor & Laurent Eyquem
Best Classical Film	Scrooge
Best Short Film	The Maltese Fighter
Best Documentary	Pass Pass Għal Auschwitz
Best Screenplay	Jean Pierre Magro
Best TV Series	L-Għarusa
Best Classic TV Series	Għeruq
Lifetime Achievement Award	Mario Philip Azzopardi
Malta Film Commissioner Award	Colin Trevorrow

== Nominations ==
The nominations for the Malta Film Awards were announced on 16 December 2021

Award	Nominees
Best Film	The Boat
Best Film	Id-Destin
Best Film	Blood on the Crown
Best Film	The Weeping House of Qala
Best Film	Ħabbilni Ħa Nirbaħ
Best Short Film	Since You've Been Gone
Best Short Film	The Maltese Fighter
Best Short Film	Ambivalent
Best Short Film	Friend or Foe
Best Short Film	Alicia
Best TV Show	Ċaqqufa
Best TV Show	L-Għarusa
Best TV Show	L-Ispettur
Best TV Show	Strada Stretta
Best TV Show	Division 7
Best Documentary	Ittri Għal Erika
Best Documentary	The Final Journey: The Phoenician Shipwreck
Best Documentary	L-Ittra ta’ Napuljun
Best Documentary	Kużra
Best Documentary	Pass Pass Għal Auschwitz
Best Director	Davide Ferrario
Best Director	Jonathon Farrugia
Best Director	Justin Farrugia u Steven Dalli
Best Director	Winston Azzopardi
Best Post-Production	Daniel Lapira, James Hayday, Stargate Studios Malta
Best Post-Production	Justin Farrugia, Steven Dalli, Chanelle Demicoli, Angele Farrugia, Charles Aquilina, Lon Joseph Cahca
Best Post-Production	Justin Farrugia, Steven Dalli, Marco Stafrace, Angelle Farrugia, Charles Aquilina, Lon Joseph Cacha
Best Post-Production	Pedja Miletic, Claudio Cormio, Vito Martinelli, Aaron Briffa, Nikita Argunov
Best Post-Production	Mark Doneo, Sean Aquilina, Jake Vassalo, Aleksandar Bundalo, Nicolai Aquilina
Best Cinematography	Isaac Fenech
Best Cinematography	Keefa Chan
Best Cinematography	Marek Taskowski
Best Classic Film	Louis Cuscheri, Paul Preca Trapani, Angie Casha for Qerq
Best Classic Film	Louis Cuscheri for Mera tal-Passat
Best Classic Film	Alan Fenech, Tony Parnis for Scrooge
Best Classic Film	Mario Busietta, Paul Preca Trapani, John Preca Trapani for Anġli – The Movie
Best Classic Film	Tony Parnis, Paul Preca Trapani for Operation White Dove
Best Classic TV Series	Hermann Bonaci, Frida Cauchi for Gheruq
Best Classic TV Series	Hermann Bonaci for Il-Madonna tac-Coqqa
Best Classic TV Series	Tony Parnis, TVM for Il-Mandraggara
Best Classic TV Series	Hermann Bonaci, Karl Bonaci for Ipokriti
Best Classic TV Series	Hermann Bonaci, Frida Cauchi for Simpatici
Best Costume Design	Martina Zammit Maempel for The Boat
Best Costume Design	Louie Noir for Scrooge
Best Costume Design	Giulia Orsi for Blood on the Crown
Best Costume Design	Angelle Farrugia, Audrey Brincat Dalli for Strada Stretta
Best Costume Design	Angelle Farrugia, Audrey Brincat Dalli for L-Gharusa
Best Hair & Makeup Design	Christian Kotey, Jannie Stax
Best Hair & Makeup Design	Daniel Parker
Best Hair & Makeup Design	Kim Deguara, Marie Therese Morris
Best Hair & Makeup Design	Krista Zammit Marmara, Mark Stafrace
Best Hair & Makeup Design	Krista Zammit Marmara, Soraya
Best Actor in a Leading Role	Godwin Scerri
Best Actor in a Leading Role	Harvey Keitel
Best Actor in a Leading Role	Malcolm McDowell
Best Actor in a Leading Role	Mario Micallef
Best Actor in a Leading Role	Mark Doneo
Best Actress in a Leading Role	Claire Aguis
Best Actress in a Leading Role	Louise Doneo
Best Actress in a Leading Role	Mary Rose Mallia
Best Actress in a Leading Role	Paula Mintoff
Best Actor in a Supporting Role	Carlos Farrugia
Best Actor in a Supporting Role	Ian Virgo
Best Actor in a Supporting Role	Leeshon Alexander
Best Actor in a Supporting Role	Narcy Calamatta
Best Actor in a Supporting Role	Sinclair Mifsud
Best Actress in a Supporting Role	Antonella Axisa
Best Actress in a Supporting Role	Jane Marshall
Best Actress in a Supporting Role	Mary Rose Mallia
Best Actress in a Supporting Role	Nicola Mangion
Best Actress in a Supporting Role	Sarah Camilleri
Best Production Design	Ino Bonello
Best Production Design	Sasa Jovanovic
Best Production Design	Mela Melak
Best Production Design	Justin Farrugia, Steven Dalli
Best Screenplay	Winston Azzopardi, Joe Azzopardi
Best Screenplay	Audrey Brincat Dalli
Best Screenplay	Jean Pierre Magro
Best Screenplay	Alan Fenech
Best Musical Score	Alexey Shor, Laurent Eyquem
Best Musical Score	Mark Attard
Best Musical Score	Lachlan Anderson
Best Musical Score	Elton Zarb
Best Musical Score	Dominic Cini
