= List of monuments in Fgura =

This is a list of monuments in Fgura, Malta, which are listed on the National Inventory of the Cultural Property of the Maltese Islands.

== List ==
Name of object	Location	Coordinates	ID	Photo	Upload
Parish Church of Our Lady of Mount Carmel	Triq Hompesch	35°52′22″N 14°31′15″E	00009	Parish Church of Our Lady of Mount Carmel	Upload Photo
