= Sons of the Sea =

Sons of the Sea may refer to:

- "Sons of the Sea" (Dad's Army), a 1969 episode of the British comedy series Dad's Army
- Sons of the Sea (1926 film), a silent film
- Sons of the Sea (1939 film), a British spy film
- Atlantic Ferry, a 1941 British film
- "Sons of the Sea" (song), an 1897 English music hall song
- Sons of the Sea (album), an album by the American alternative rock band Sons of the Sea
