= Diego Guijarro =

Spanish-Canadian cinematographer

- Occupation: Cinematographer
- Website: https://www.diegoguijarro.com/

Diego Guijarro Alvarez, known professionally as Diego Guijarro, is a Spanish-Canadian cinematographer. He is most noted for his work on the 2021 film Carmen, for which he won the Borsos Competition award for Best Cinematography in a Canadian film at the 2021 Whistler Film Festival.

== Early life and education ==
A native of Madrid, Guijarro moved to Canada at age 19 to study English. Deciding to stay in Canada, he studied cinematography at Sheridan College, and won the Canadian Society of Cinematographers award for Best Student Cinematography in 2016 for his fourth-year student film House of Glory.

== Career ==
Guijarro's credits include the films Islands and Cascade, and music videos for Lydia Ainsworth, Nikki Yanofsky and Begonia.

== Awards ==
In 2021, Guijarro won Best Cinematography at the Whistler Film Festival.
