= Our Lady of Mount Carmel Parish Church, Fgura =

Church in Fgura, Malta

Our Lady of Mount Carmel Church
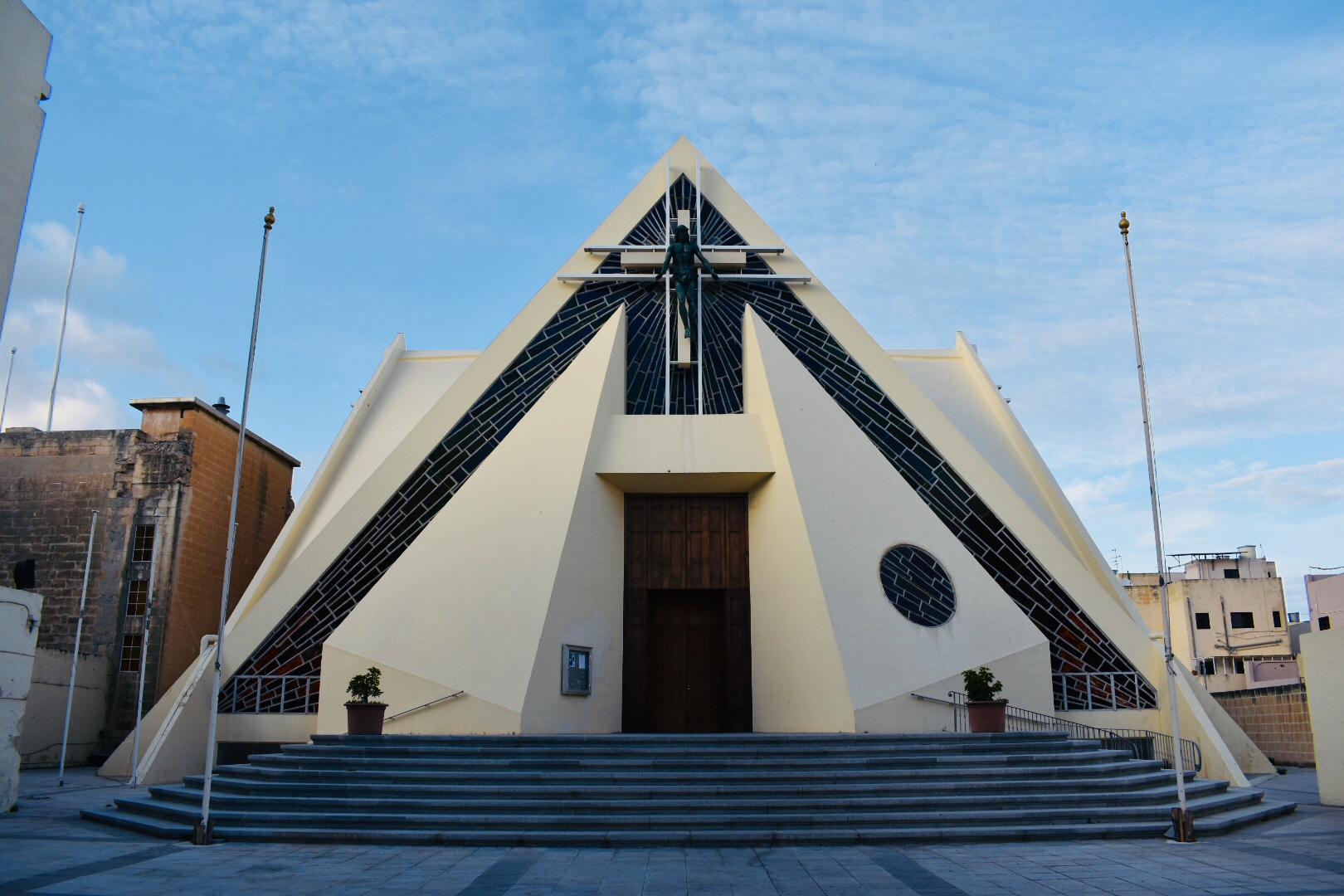
- The main façade of the Church

Religion
- Affiliation: Roman Catholic
- Rite: Latin
- Ecclesiastical or organizational status: Parish church

Location
- Location: Fgura, Malta
- Interactive map of Our Lady of Mount Carmel Church
- Coordinates: 35°52′22.7″N 14°31′15.1″E

Architecture
- Architects: Godfrey Azzopardi and Edward Micallef
- Type: Church building
- Style: Contemporary
- Materials: Enforced concrete

The Our Lady of Mount Carmel Church is a late 20th century Parish church in Fgura, Malta. It was designed in 1981 by Architect and Engineer Godfrey Azzopardi and built in 1988. The presbytery was designed a year before its construction by Edward Micallef. The building is a listed monument and an active Roman Catholic Church.

== History ==
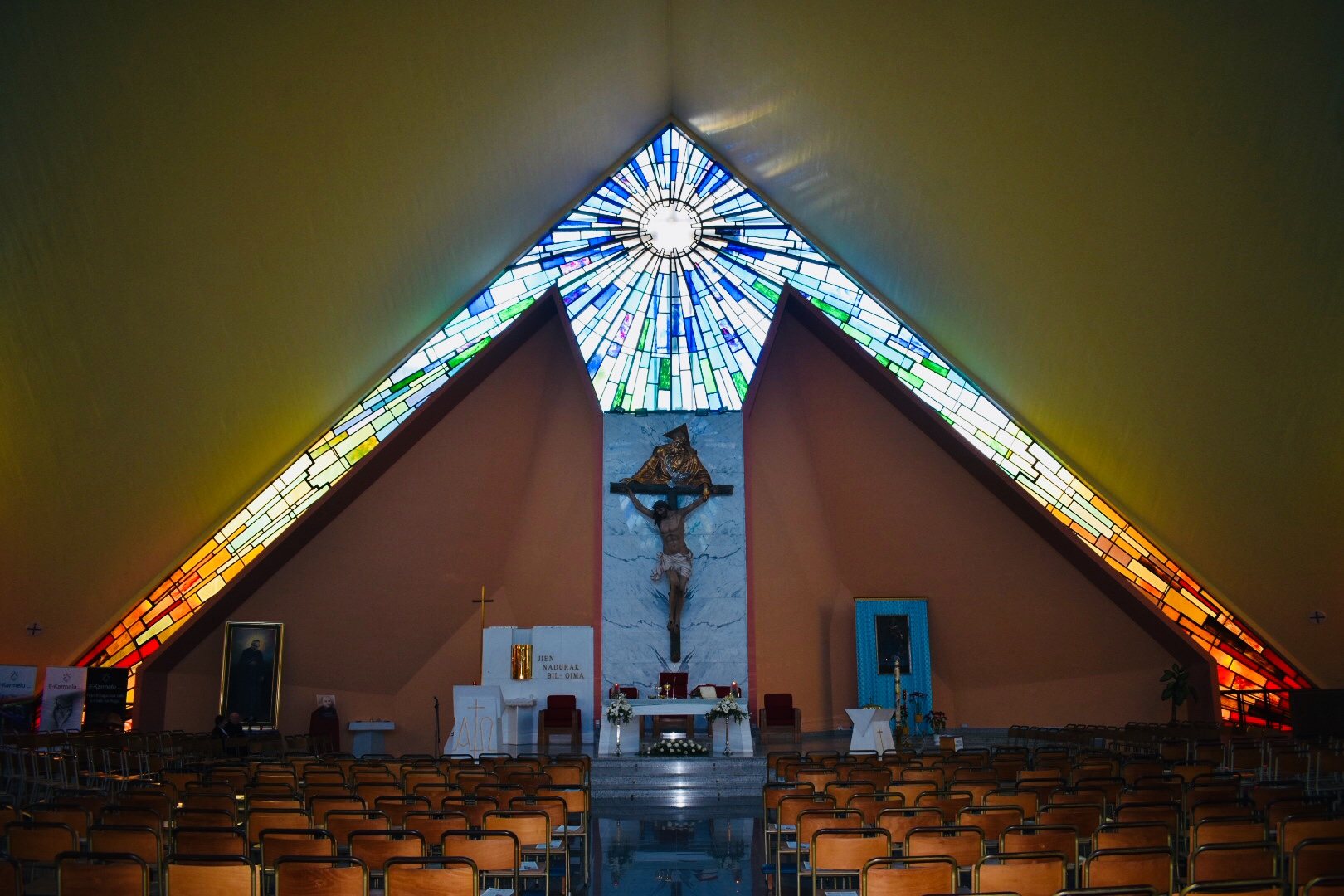
The interior

Architect Godfrey Azzopardi received consultations from then the Head of Architecture of Maltconsult International, architect Edward Micallef, when he was given advice over the unusual architecture of the structure. The main material supporting the building is reinforced concrete. The layout from the exterior is pyramidical, with a triangular opening on each four sides, which gives the impression of a floating building aimed to appear as a tent. The main façade is characterized by a statue of Jesus on a crucifix which was originally designed for the interior. The main feature of the interior, beside other ecclesiastic ornaments, is the presbytery that was designed by Micallef in 1987. The stained glass was designed by artist Alfred Camilleri. The Church is run by the Carmelite Friars, a Roman Catholic institution, and remains active.

The church is listed on the National Inventory of the Cultural Property of the Maltese Islands (NICPMI).

== See also ==
- List of monuments in Fgura
