= Malta Film Commission =

Quasi-governmental organization in Malta

- Kummissjoni tal-Films
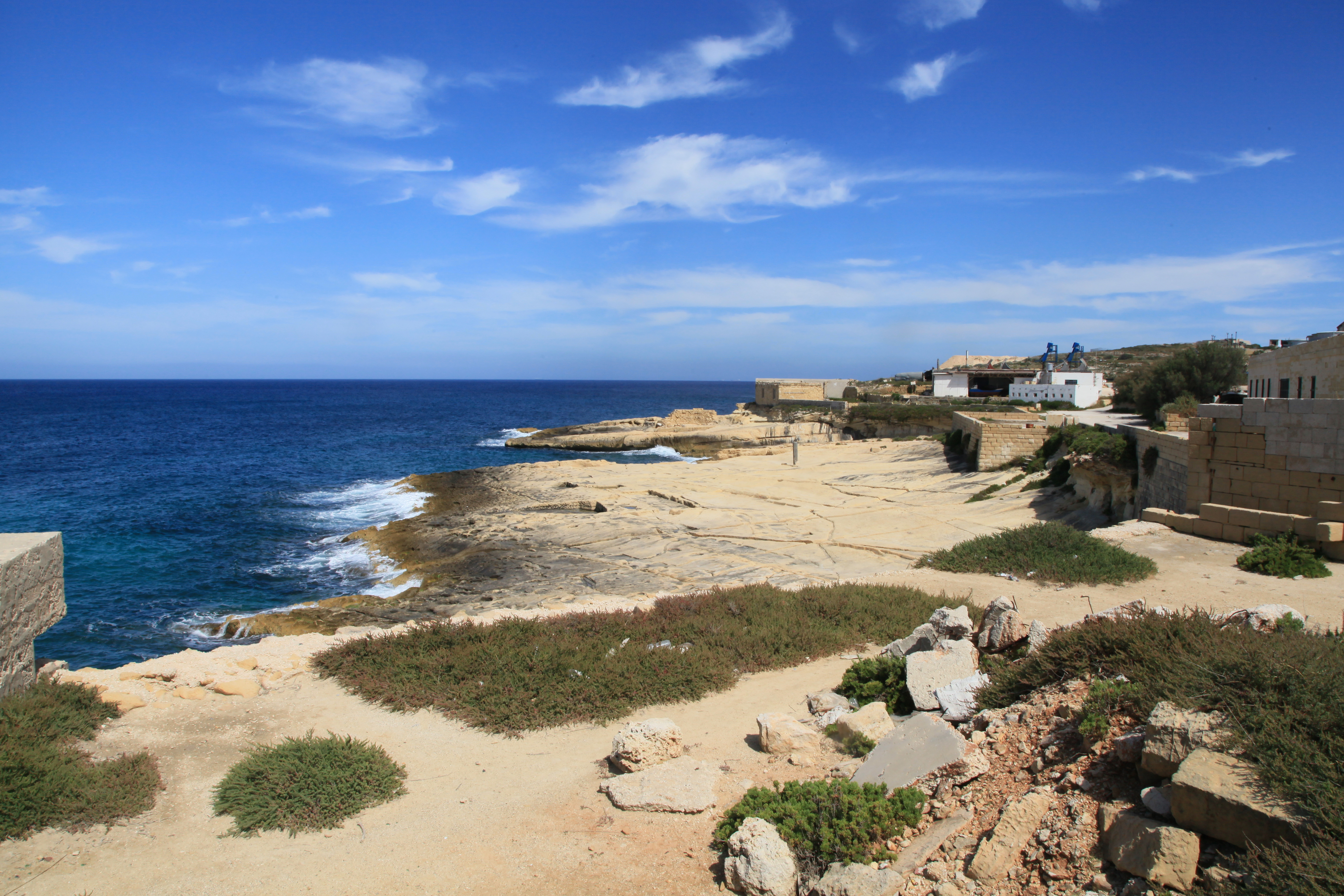

Agency overview
- Formed: 1999; 27 years ago
- Jurisdiction: Government of Malta
- Headquarters: Kalkara
- Agency executive: Johann Grech
- Website: https://maltafilmcommission.com

The Malta Film Commission (Maltese: Il-Kummisjoni tal-Films) is a quasi-governmental, non-profit, public organization based in Malta. Their primary purpose is to attract film productions to come to Malta for the benefit of the Maltese economy. Its offices are located at the Malta Film Studios in Kalkara. The first proposal for a film commission was lobbied by Malcolm Scerri-Ferrante in 1997. The commission was then created as a film liaison office in 1999. Over the 22 years it has been operating, numerous financing incentives have been presented in 2005, 2008 and in 2014.

The current film commissioner is Johann Grech. The implementation of new strategy has led to a large growth in the industry, with over 50 productions filmed in Malta resulting in more than €200 million being injected into Malta's economy via these incentives. The Film Commission also provides support for smaller film services within the country. Recently, the commission have organized the first edition of the Malta Film Awards. They were held on 29 January 2022.

== Malta film studios ==
The Malta Film Studios (formerly Mediterranean Film Studios) is a film studio complex located in Kalkara, Malta, and operated by the Malta Film Commission. The studios are internationally known for their large exterior water tanks designed for maritime and underwater filming, making them one of Malta's most distinctive film-production facilities.

=== History ===
The studios originated from a plan in 1963 by British special-effects specialist Jim Hole and Maltese construction manager Paul Avellino to construct a shallow water tank near Fort Rinella for controlled maritime filming. The first tank was completed in 1964 and was initially used for the production of The Bedford Incident (1965).

Originally operating as Malta Film Facilities, the complex was rebranded as Mediterranean Film Studios in 1978. A second deep-water tank was constructed in 1979 for the production of Raise the Titanic (1980). Over subsequent decades, ownership passed between private and public operators before the facility came under government administration and was renamed Malta Film Studios.

The facility has operated for more than six decades and has attracted international productions due to Malta's climate, coastline, experienced film workforce, and specialised water-filming infrastructure.

=== Facilities ===
Malta Film Studios contains three principal water tanks:

- Shallow Exterior Tank – constructed in 1964, measuring approximately 91 m by 122 m with a depth of 1.8 m and a central pit reaching approximately 4 m.
- Deep Exterior Tank – completed in 1979, reaching depths of approximately 36 feet (11 m), designed primarily for underwater cinematography.
- Indoor Tank – a smaller controlled-environment tank used for insert shots and specialised filming.

The exterior tanks are designed to visually merge with the natural sea horizon, creating the illusion of open-ocean filming conditions.

=== Productions ===
More than one hundred international film and television productions have utilised the studios. Notable productions include:

- The Bedford Incident (1965)
- Orca (1977)
- Raise the Titanic (1980)
- Popeye (1980)
- Clash of the Titans (1981)
- Christopher Columbus (1985)
- White Squall (1996)
- U-571 (2000)
- The Count of Monte Cristo (2002)
- Captain Phillips (2013)
- Portions of Game of Thrones
- Assassin's Creed (2016)

The nearby Fort Ricasoli has frequently been used alongside the studios for major productions, including Gladiator (2000) and its sequel.

In 2024, portions of Jurassic World Rebirth were filmed at Malta Film Studios.

=== Development plans ===
In 2025, Film Commissioner Johann Grech described Malta as a "dream" location for a future James Bond production. The Malta Film Commission has also announced plans for major studio expansion through a masterplan that includes a proposed "Land-Sea Super Stage", intended to combine conventional soundstage facilities with Malta's established maritime filming infrastructure.
