= Kinemastik =

Started 2004

Kinemastik is a non governmental, non profit organisation responsible for a year-round cultural programme of screenings, talks, exhibitions, concerts and the Kinemastik International Short Film Festival which was started in 2004. Kinemastik sees itself as an art collective, founded and based in Malta.

Over1 years of its existence, Kinemastik has hosted many filmmakers, musicians, artists and film festival organisers. The festival has been described by journalist Ramona Depares as "merging music with visual arts and movies in one seamless experience".

Kinemastik has hosted a number of film based workshops, guided by various professionals from all over the world. Some of the musicians that played at Kinemastik events were Patti Smith, Bonnie Prince Billy, Owen Pallett, Dark Horses and the Australian/Maltese Christian Anarcho Punks 'Haqqha il-Madonna bukkett fjuri?'.

Kinemastik Film Club holds screenings every Wednesday in Valletta. It was designed as a source for non-mainstream and off-beat movies, a step away from the pervasive and easily available Hollywood mainstream movies. Kinemastik invites various individuals from all sorts of backgrounds to program a month of films for the Kinemastik Film Club.

Kinemastik collaborates with many film festivals such as Milano Film Festival, Next Film Festival, Cosmic Zoom, Clermond Ferrand Film Fest, London Short Film Festival and many others.

Steph Von Reiswitz and Chris Bianchi from the London-based Le Gun collective oversee Kinemastik's artwork
