= Tal-Qadi Stone =

The Tal-Qadi Stone (Maltese: il-Ġebla ta' Tal-Qadi) is a Maltese documentary film produced by Chris Micallef and Maurice Micallef with assistance from the television channel One. It received the Best Director Award-Documentary at the 2007 New York International Independent Film and Video Festival .

The documentary was the only Maltese entry in this festival, which also screened 88 productions from around the world.
