= Sons of the Sea (1926 film) =

British Instructional Film

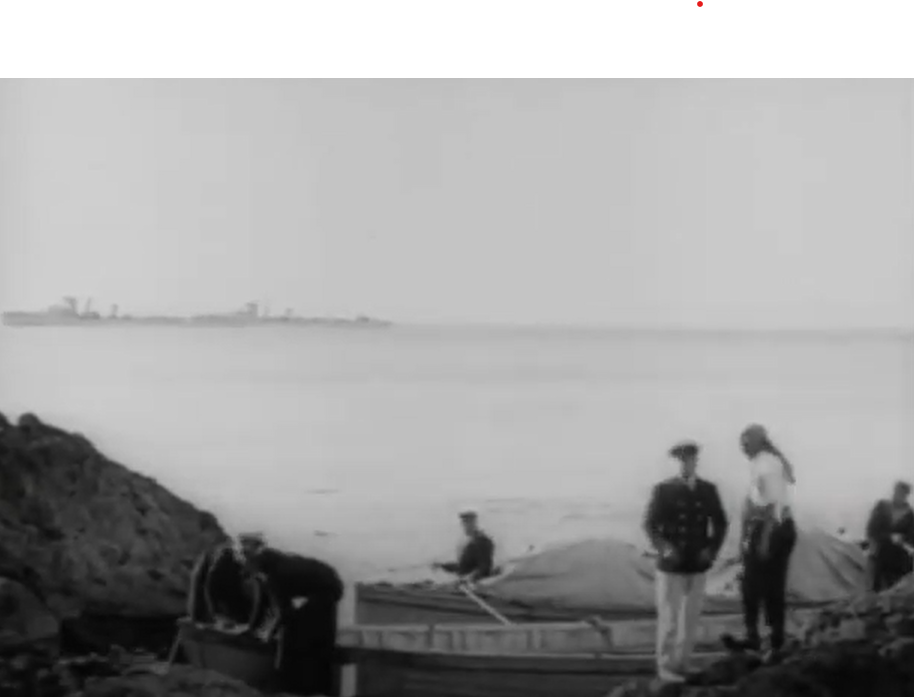
- Screen capture
- Directed by: H. Bruce Woolfe
- Written by: H. Bruce Woolfe
- Produced by: H. Bruce Woolfe
- Starring: D.C. Kenerdine, E. Godfrey, Dorothy Barclay
- Production company: British Instructional Films
- Distributed by: Stoll Picture Productions
- Release date: September 1925 (UK)
- Country: United Kingdom
- Language: English

Sons of the Seas (1926), is a silent film which is mostly known for being the first film filmed in Malta in 1925. The major reason why this and three other films from the interwar era were filmed on Malta was because of the presence of the Admiralty there. The fictitious Sons of the Sea tells the tale of two young men who join the Navy. The film is archived at the British Film Institute, where only four out of six reels remain. The film was set to be screened by both the Malta Film Commission and Heritage Malta

== Plot ==
A rich boy and a gardener's son join the navy in 1914 and later save a girl from Mediterranean bandits. A much fuller plot summary is given at.

== Cast ==
- D.C. Kenerdine as Derek Bray
- E. Godfrey as Bill Martin
- Dorothy Barclay as Diana
