= Qerq =

- Directed by: Louis Cuschieri
- Written by: Louis Cuschieri
- Produced by: Bronk Productions
- Starring: Frida Cauchi; Maria Farrugia; Fabian Scerri de Carlo
- Cinematography: Paul Preca Trapani
- Distributed by: KRS
- Release date: 31 January 2007
- Running time: 140 minutes
- Country: Malta
- Language: Maltese
- Budget: €80,000

Qerq (pronounced [ˈʔɛrʔ]; "Deception") is a Maltese thriller released in 2007. The film was written and directed by Louis Cuschieri, and stars Frida Cauchi, Maria Farrugia and Fabian Scerri de Carlo.

== Plot ==
After twenty-five years in an institution for the mentally ill, Grace (Cauchi) is discharged and Dr. Spiteri (Saliba) helps get her a job with banker David Caruana and his wife as a personal maid to their daughter. She's happy there but she still longs to find her daughter Angela. Meanwhile, Angela has been released from a female correctional facility and she and her boyfriend fall in with thief Victor Gatt and his gang.

== Criticism ==
The Times of Malta writer David Pisani criticized the film for its "poor level of direction and acting", although he also stated that "the true failing of Qerq lies in its abandon of those three virtues of narrative, magic, and style."

Maltese film critic Eric German compared Qerq to "the worst melodramas and tear-jerkers of the 1940s", stating that "Louis Cuschieri hasn't left a single ancient cliché unturned. Qerq would be hilariously funny if it weren't such a tragically missed opportunity." He praised the actors for "giving the roles everything they've got." He also praised the "visual class" and "imaginative photography" of cinematographer Preca Trapani. German gave the film 2 out of 5 stars.

== Box office ==
In spite of the bad reviews elicited, Qerq topped the box office during the first week, continuing to lead the chart during the second, with a 63 per cent increase in the admissions.
