= KRS Releasing =

KRS Releasing (previously known as KRS Film Distributors) is a Maltese film distributor company, formed in 1946 under the name of the Malta United Film Corporation.

Throughout its years of operation, over 10,000 film productions have been launched by the company in both Malta and Gozo, distributing films from more than forty countries.

== History ==
In 1946, the UK film trade association; Kinematograph Renter’s Society (now known as the Film Distributors' Association, normally shortened to FDA), started to oversee film distribution in Malta. It set up the Malta United Film Corporation to distribute films in Malta. Prior to its formation, Maltese exhibitors had to deal with UK distributors individually. In 1978, the company was renamed to KRS Film Distributors and then to KRS Releasing in 2014.

== Cinemas on the Maltese islands ==
In the 1950s, Malta had 48 commercial cinemas, four British military cinemas and 16 halls licensed to screen films. By 2024, there were just five remaining, with the Empire Cinema Complex, located at Pioneer Corps Road, Buġibba, St. Paul's Bay, closing its doors in 2022. The "Cinema Heritage Group surmised that the cinema fell victim to the COVID-19 pandemic, which left such leisure establishments unable to operate", as quoted by WhosWho.mt.

The five remaining cinemas left in operation in Malta and Gozo are:

- Citadel Cinema, Castle Hill, Victoria, Gozo
- Eden Cinemas, St. Augustine Street, St. George's Bay, St. Julian's
- Embassy Cinemas, Embassy Complex, St. Lucia Street, Valletta
- Spazju Kreattiv Cinema, St. James Cavalier, Castille Square, Valletta
- Galleria Cinema (previously known as Tal-Lira Cinema), Galleria Shopping and Entertainment Centre, Żabbar Road, Fgura

== Box office data ==
Box office data is not reported regularly by KRS Releasing, but box office totals for films shown in Malta and Gozo are provided to the FDA annually for inclusion in UK box office totals.

== 2023 cinema statistics ==
According to Malta's National Statistics Office (NSO), "in 2023, cinemas in Malta and Gozo projected 385 different film titles and registered a total of 594,087 admissions." According to the same statistics, the top ten films ranked by number of admissions for 2023 were:

2023 cinema statistics (NSO Malta)
Rank	Title	Country of origin	Type	Number of admissions
1	Barbie	US	Fiction (Non-animation)	52,488
2	The Little Mermaid	US	Fiction (Non-animation)	28,017
3	The Super Mario Bros. Movie	US	Animation	28,001
4	Oppenheimer	US	Fiction (Non-animation)	27,577
5	Avatar: The Way of Water	US	Fiction (Non-animation)	25,660
6	Wonka	US	Fiction (Non-animation)	20,814
7	Spider-Man: Across the Spider-Verse	US	Animation	15,638
8	Fast X	US	Fiction (Non-animation)	15,018
9	Napoleon	US	Fiction (Non-animation)	13,849
10	Elemental	US	Animation	13,519

== Highest-grossing films in Malta till 2018 ==
The highest-grossing films of all-time in Malta up to the end of 2018 were:

Rank	Title	Year
1	Titanic	1997
2	Bohemian Rhapsody	2018
3	The Passion of the Christ	2004
4	Avatar	2009
5	Beauty and the Beast	2017
6	Gladiator	2000
7	Harry Potter and the Philosopher's Stone	2001
8	Johnny English	2003
9	Armageddon	1998
10	Bean - The Ultimate Disaster Movie	1997

== Cinema Days ==
KRS Releasing introduced two Children's Cinema Days and a National Cinema Day with reduced prices to boost attendance.

In 2024, KRS organised a National Cinema Day on 10 August 2024, in collaboration with all Maltese and Gozitan cinemas with "a variety of films, including the latest blockbuster releases, Deadpool & Wolverine, Longlegs, Harold and the Purple Crayon and Despicable Me 4, together with two new releases, Trap and Borderlands, will be screened on the day" and with reduced admission prices and a Children's Cinema Day was organised on 19 October 2024 with "the list of screenings (including) the most recent releases, such as Garfield: The Movie, Dragonkeeper, Noah’s Ark, Despicable Me 4, Kensuke’s Kingdom, Inside Out 2 and Harold and the Purple Crayon as well as three new releases Transformers One, The Wild Robot and My Hero Academia: You’re Next."

In 2007, Children's Cinema Day was organised on 3 March 2007, in collaboration with all Maltese cinemas (apart from Spazju Kreattiv Cinema, which normally showcases more arthouse films instead of mainstream films).

The KRS' 2007 National Cinema Day was held on Saturday 7 July 2007. On this day, films shown for the public were at the reduced price of Lm1.30c (€3.03c) per person, with screenings starting at 9:30 a.m and finishing late at night. KRS Film Distributors lined up 17 films for the occasion, including three new films.

The second Children's Cinema Day for 2007 organised by KRS was celebrated on Saturday, 1 September 2007, including one film that was not previewed before this day, the animated film Happily N'Ever After.
