= Voyage (1993 film) =

1993 film directed by John Mackenzie

- VHS cover
- Genre: Adventure; Thriller
- Screenplay by: Mark Montgomery
- Story by: Mark Montgomery; Khris Baxter
- Directed by: John Mackenzie
- Starring: Rutger Hauer; Eric Roberts; Karen Allen
- Music by: Carl Davis
- Country of origin: United States
- Original language: English

Production
- Producers: Tarak Ben Ammar; Peby Guisez; John Davis; Merrill Karpf
- Production location: Malta
- Cinematography: Clive Tickner
- Editor: Graham Walker
- Running time: 86 minutes
- Production companies: Quinta Communications; Davis Entertainment

Original release
- Network: USA Network
- Release: June 2, 1993

Voyage, also known as Cruise of Fear, is a 1993 British-American adventure thriller television film directed by John Mackenzie and starring Rutger Hauer, Eric Roberts, and Karen Allen. It premiered on the USA Network on June 2, 1993.

== Plot ==
Morgan and Catherine Norvell have their plans ready. In Monte Carlo, they have stocked their sailboat for a journey to Malta, where they plan to live on the boat for a year. They also purchased some real estate that includes the ruins of an old hotel, which they are going to rebuild. A few days before embarking on their adventures, they meet Gil and Ronnie Freeland, who would give anything to join them for a couple of days on the sea. However, no sooner said than done, all four of them are enjoying the sweet life on the boat. The Norvells soon realise that inviting them on board was a big mistake.

== Cast ==
- Rutger Hauer as Morgan Norvell
- Eric Roberts as Gil Freeland
- Karen Allen as Catherine 'Kit' Norvell
- Connie Nielsen as Ronnie Freeland
- Hazel Ellerby as Maria
- Larry Powell as Business Man
- Peter Baldacchino as Louis
- Martin Corrado as First Bar Man
- Joe Zarb Cousin as Second Bar Man
- Phyllis Carlysle as the First Woman Photographed
- Sue Ellen Denisen as Second Woman Photographed
- Betty Mitchell as Bar Client
