= Cats of Malta =

2023 documentary film

- Directed by: Sarah Jayne Portelli
- Produced by: Sarah Jayne Portelli and Ivan Malekin
- Cinematography: Ivan Malekin
- Edited by: Ivan Malekin
- Music by: Asher Pope
- Production company: Nexus Production Group
- Release date: 2023
- Running time: 68 minutes
- Country: Malta
- Language: English

Cats of Malta is a 2023 Maltese documentary film directed by Sarah Jayne Portelli and produced by Sarah Jayne Portelli and Ivan Malekin of Nexus Production Group LTD.

== Plot ==
Through interviews with local feeders, artists and volunteers, Cats of Malta explores the colourful cat colonies, cat cafes, parks and streets that define the island, and the power of the community within the human-cat connection.

Each interview reveals a little more about the place of stray cats in Malta, giving insight into the inner workings of Malta's cat community, their highs and lows, the mental health benefits cats provide locals and tourists, and how cats unite the island.

== Background ==
=== Production ===
Principal photography began in March 2020, during the early stages of the COVID-19 pandemic, at Sliema, Malta. With two crew members—the director and producer— Cats of Malta was one of the first feature films to begin principal photography and production in Malta during the pandemic and principal photography concluded in June 2020.

=== Film screenings ===
The world premiere of Cats of Malta took place at The Melbourne Documentary Film Festival, Melbourne, Australia on Monday July, 25th 2022 at Federation Square.

Cats of Malta had its US premiere at the 13th Chagrin Falls Documentary Film Festival, Chagrin Falls, Ohio, on October 8, 2022. The free film screening was held outdoors at Riverside Park, Chagrin Falls, and was opened by the Mayor Bill Koons, and preceded by a Felines on Parade event where the public attended with their cats. Also in attendance were Rescue Village, a humane society in Geauga County, Ohio, that focuses its effort on the Cleveland area's eastern communities.

On June 1 and 7 2023 Cats of Malta enjoyed an Asian premiere when the film screened out of competition within the category of 'Dear Our Animal Friends' at the Seoul Eco International Film Festival in Seoul, Korea. There was also an online component to the festival.

The Cats of Malta PBS premiere was on October 26, 2024. The films three year PBS broadcast is underwritten by partners Visit Malta USA and has the potential to reach 1.3 million viewers.

In mid-November 2024,Cats of Malta represented Malta at the European Union Film Festival (EUFF) in Canada, an annual showcase of contemporary European cinema produced in the European Union. As part of the festival, Cats of Malta screened live at the Toronto Spadina Theatre at Alliance française, Ottawa Art Gallery and The Cinematheque in Vancouver, followed by being shown online from December 1–17, 2024.

Hosted by its founders, the Canadian Film Institute, EUFF 2024 ran from November 15–30 and is presented in partnership with Vancouver (Cinematheque) and Toronto (EU Toronto Film Festival), with the support of the Delegation of the European Union (EU) to Canada.

On the 5th of December 2024, Cats of Malta was screened to a select audience of 100 people at the Hibiya Library & Museum, Tokyo, Japan. After the screening Cats of Malta's director and producer Sarah Jayne Portelli and producer and cinematographer Ivan Malekin, from Nexus Production Group took part in the Q&A section, answering questions from the audience with assistance from a local interpreter.

The appearance of the filmmakers in Japan was supported by Arts Council Malta and Visit Malta Japan.

In the audience was First Resident Ambassador of the Republic of Malta to Japan Andre Spiteri and Shingo Endo, representative for the Malta Tourism Authority Japan and Korea.

This advance screening and all press surrounding the Japanese release was organised and promoted by the film's Japanese distributor Fine Films Japan, as a lead up prior to the official Japanese theatrical release set for January 10th 2025.

From January 10, 2025, Cats of Malta was shown theatrically across Japan at select cinemas.

== Release ==
The film was released on digital streaming platforms on September 21, 2023, in Malta and Spanish-speaking Latin American territories, September 25, 2023, in the UK and Ireland, and on October 11, 2023, in France, Belgium, Luxembourg and Switzerland by Under The Milky Way. On the 3rd of October 2023, Cats of Malta was released in the US and Canada by Lion Heart Distribution on various digital streaming platforms.

On January 10, 2025, Cats of Malta was released theatrically in Japan across 13 cities by Japanese distributor Fine Films. The film was renamed "Nekoshima", translated to Cat Island, for Japanese audiences.

== Reception ==
Critical reception for Cats of Malta has been favorable and the film has a rating of 100% on review aggregator website Rotten Tomatoes, based on 8 reviews with an average rating of 7.10 out of 10 Rating.

Leslie Felperin of The Guardian gave the movie a rating of 3/5, noting that the film's "tone and purpose are a little hazy at times, making this not as satisfying as spending a good hour browsing cat memes, but it is still soft, fuzzy and purr-inducing". John Noonan from FilmInk and Michael Talbot-Haynes from Film Threat both wrote favorably of the film, with Noonan writing "Endearing and heart-warming, Cats of Malta avoids being simply an extended YouTube video of cats frolicking by highlighting how members of the community are brought together." Eddie Harrison of Film-Authority.com was also favorable.
