= Ex Ex Lovers =

2025 romantic comedy film by JP Habac

- Theatrical release poster
- Directed by: JP Habac
- Written by: Antoinette Jadaone; Kristine Gabriel
- Produced by: Antoinette Jadaone
- Starring: Jolina Magdangal; Marvin Agustin
- Cinematography: Kara Moreno
- Edited by: Benjamin Tolentino
- Music by: Len Calvo
- Production companies: Project 8 Projects; Cornerstone Studios; CMB Film Services; Sineng Labuyo Entertainment
- Distributed by: Warner Bros. Pictures
- Release date: February 12, 2025
- Running time: 105 minutes
- Country: Philippines
- Language: Filipino

Ex Ex Lovers is a 2025 Philippine romantic comedy film directed by JP Habac from a story and screenplay written by Antoinette Jadaone and Kristine Gabriel. Starring Jolina Magdangal and Marvin Agustin with Juan Karlos Labajo and Loisa Andalio, it centers around two ex-couples reconnecting for their daughter's wedding. Produced by Project 8 Projects and Cornerstone Studios, the film marks the sixth on-screen collaboration of Magdangal and Agustin since Hey Babe! (1999).

== Plot ==
Set against the picturesque backdrop of Valletta, Malta, Ex Ex Lovers follows Joy San Pedro (Jolina Magdangal), a single mother who has been raising her daughter, SC (Loisa Andalio), after separating from her husband, Cedric "Ced" Hermoso (Marvin Agustin). Despite their separation, Joy and Ced remain legally married due to the Philippines' lack of divorce laws.

The story begins when SC's boyfriend, Joey (Juan Karlos Labajo), surprises everyone by proposing to her during a Valentine's dinner. SC accepts, but she has one request: she wants both her parents to walk her down the aisle. This means Joy must reconnect with Ced, who has been living and working in Malta.

Reluctantly, Joy travels to Malta to find Ced. Their reunion is filled with unresolved tensions, past grievances, and unexpected sparks. As they navigate their shared history, Joy and Ced agree to a plan: they'll return to the Philippines together and subtly convince SC to reconsider her rushed engagement, hoping to prevent her from making the same mistakes they did.

Back home, their scheme leads to a series of comedic and heartfelt moments. As they spend more time together, old feelings resurface, and they begin to question whether their relationship deserves a second chance. However, Joy remains cautious, remembering the pain of their past.

The film occurs during a heated confrontation between SC and Joey's conservative parents, highlighting the societal stigma surrounding separated families in the Philippines. This moment forces Joy and Ced to reflect on their own relationship and the impact of their choices on their daughter.

In the end, Joy and Ced come to a mutual understanding. They acknowledge that while they may not be suited as romantic partners, they share a deep, platonic bond and a commitment to their daughter's happiness. Two years later, the film concludes with Joy and Ced sharing a bottle of champagne in Malta, celebrating their enduring friendship and the family they've built together.

== Cast ==
=== Main Cast ===
- Jolina Magdangal as Joy San Pedro, SC's Mother and Ced's Ex-wife.
- Marvin Agustin as Cedric Hermoso, SC's father and Joy's Ex-husband.
- Juan Karlos Labajo as Joey
- Loisa Andalio as SC
- Judy Ann Santos as Darlene
- Mylene Dizon as Mimi
- G. Toengi as Sophia, Joey's Mother
- Dominic Ochoa as Andres, Joey's Father
- Sam Milby as Chef Chico
- Charm Aranton as Front of house
- Soliman Cruz as Mr. C
- Arthur the Dog as Himself
- Angeli Raymundo as Jean
- Lot Bustamante as Pinay 1
- Viabelle Ria as Pinay 2
- Jan De Ada as Pinoy
- Russia Fox as Wedding Coordinator

== Production ==
The film is directed by JP Habac, known for his romantic comedy films. Producers Antoinette Jadaone and Dan Villegas of Project 8 Projects revealed that Ex Ex Lovers had been in development since 2018, with plans delayed due to the COVID-19 pandemic. According to Jadaone, the project aims the charm of 1990s rom-coms, blending humor and nostalgia. Principal photography took place in the Philippines and Malta with Valletta Pictures; and wrapped on January 15, 2025. Director JP Habac praised Magdangal and Agustin for their ease and chemistry on set.

== Marketing ==
The announcement of Ex Ex Lovers generated excitement among fans, with its teaser trailer quickly gaining traction on social media. Nostalgic callbacks to MarJo's earlier works, including Hey Babe! and Flames: The Movie, have further fueled anticipation for the film.

== Release ==
Ex Ex Lovers was theatrically released on February 12, 2025, over two decades since Magdangal and Agustin's last big-screen collaboration. This is the first film partnership between Project 8 Projects and Cornerstone Studios, following their previous successes in streaming platforms and series production. The movie was also made available on Netflix..

== Reception ==
=== Critical response ===
Le Baltar of Rappler wrote, "Though slightly overstretched and still suffused with doses of fan service, Ex Ex Lovers functions past nostalgia and mines meaningful insights about the highs and lulls of married life, how trauma encroaches selfhood, and the temper of the Filipino family... a romantic comedy done right". Writing for Spot.ph, Philbert Dy gave the film four out of five stars, describing it as "funny, nostalgic, and surprisingly rewarding". Dy also praised Magdangal's portrayal of Joy, noting that she captures the essence of a woman dealing with the aftermath of betrayal, and skillfully navigating between humor and heartache.

Fred Hawson of ABS-CBN Entertainment gave the film a rating of eight out of 10, praising the script with emphasis on the final act and also described the "delightful chemistry" between Magdangal and Agustin is "effortless, genuine and sincere". Writing for ClickTheCity.com, Wanggo Gallaga gave the film three and a half out of five, praising the onscreen charisma and talent of Magdangal and Agustin. While Gallaga criticized the "messy and chaotic" first two acts, he stated that the film "managed to find center stage at its final act."

=== Accolades ===
Award	Date	Category	Recipient	Result	Ref.
Laurus Nobilis Media Excellence Awards	March 2026	Media Excellence in Film	Ex Ex Lovers	Nominated	
Laurus Nobilis Media Excellence Awards	March 2026	Media Excellence in Film Acting (Female)	Jolina Magdangal	Nominated	
Laurus Nobilis Media Excellence Awards	March 2026	Media Excellence in Film Acting (Male)	Marvin Agustin	Nominated	
