= Fgura =

Fgura Il-Fgura Tal-Liedna
- Local council
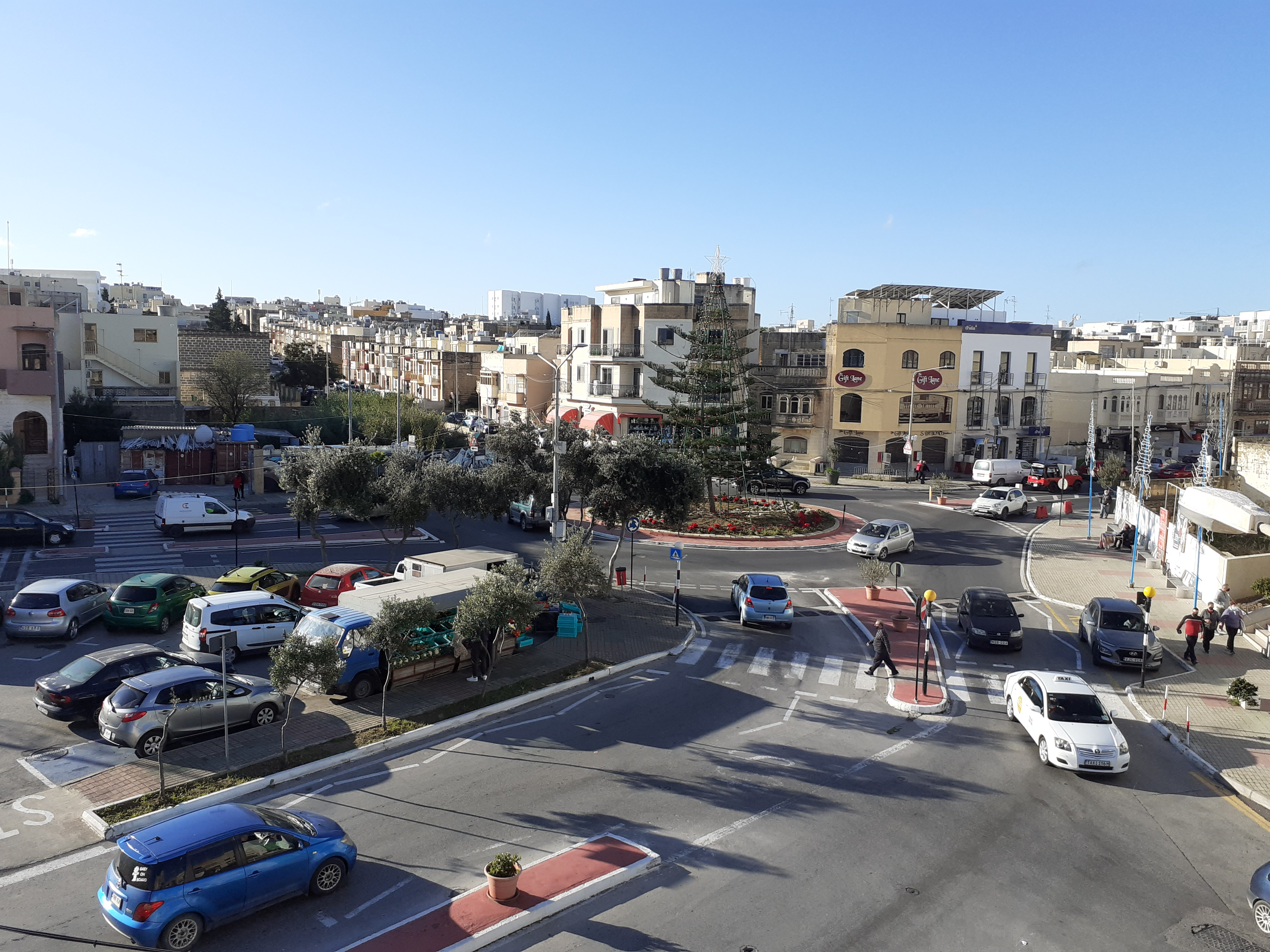
- View of the central part of Fgura

- Flag Coat of arms

- Coordinates: 35°52′21″N 14°31′16″E
- Country: Malta
- Region: Port / Central Region
- District: Southern Harbour District
- Borders: Cospicua, Paola, Tarxien, Żabbar, Żejtun

Government
  - Mayor: Clayton Cascun Portelli

Area
  - Total: 1.1 km^{2} (0.42 sq mi)

Population (Jul. 2024)
  - Total: 13,886
  - Density: 13,000/km^{2} (33,000/sq mi)
- Demonym(s): Fguri (m), Fgurija (f), Fgurin (pl)
- Time zone: UTC+1 (CET)
  - Summer (DST): UTC+2 (CEST)
- Postal code: FGR
- Dialing code: 356
- ISO 3166 code: MT-08
- Patron saint: Our Lady of Mount Carmel
- Fgura Day: The last Sunday of October
- Day of festa: 2nd Sunday of July
- Website: Official website

Fgura (Maltese: Il-Fgura, Italian: Figura) is a town in the Port Region of Malta. It has a population of 13,066 as of 2021. Its northern fringes are bordered by the Cottonera Lines of fortifications while it merges with the towns of Żabbar to the east and Paola and Tarxien to the West. A modern settlement, Fgura expanded to the outskirts of the Grand Harbour area and was one of the fastest-growing towns of Malta. Fgura has grown to become one of the foremost commercial areas in the central-southern part of the island. Today, Fgura has one of the highest population densities in the country. Six Phoenician tombs dating to the 3rd or 4th century B.C. were found in Fgura in 1948. The town's name comes from the Ficura family, who owned land in the area when it was a rural village.

== Name and symbols ==
The name Fgura comes from the surname of the Ficura (or Ficchiera) family who owned land and lived in the area when it was a rural village. This is documented in the Notary archives within the Notary Cancun documents (May 1505).

The coat-of-arms of Fgura is made up of a red horizontal stripe containing three golden 5-pointed stars, centred across a white background. Fgura Day was established by the local council in 1994, and its first celebration was held on 30 October. It is now celebrated on the last Sunday of October.

The patron saint of Fgura is Our Lady of Mount Carmel and an annual feast in her honour is celebrated on the second Sunday of July. Fgura also has one of the most peculiar shaped churches in Malta, built in the shape of a tent.

== History ==
It is thought that a settlement where Fgura currently lies existed in Phoenician times. Between 28 October and 2 December 1948, six Phoenician tombs were found in Fgura, dating to the 3rd or 4th century B.C. These tombs were in irregular shapes and human skeletons, remains of animals, pottery and other Bronze materials and objects were found. In Fgura, a street was named 'Triq is-Sejba Punika' - in English 'Phoenician Discovery Street' - in honour of this historic finding.

Medieval archaeological remains including an Arabic inscription were discovered in Fgura during a construction project in April 2023.

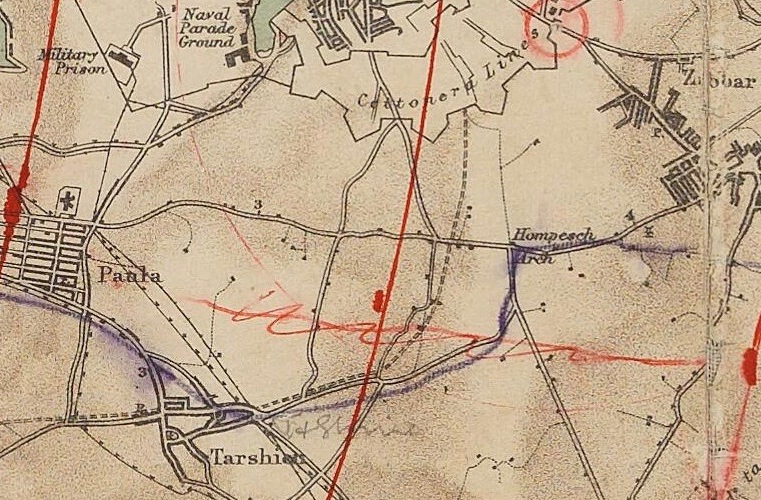
Road alignment in 1895 in the area of today's Fgura

Before World War II, Fgura was a rural village that consisted of a few scattered farmhouses, of which there remains practically nothing, situated near the new church, near the new school and on St. Thomas Street. There were 20 families and the people of this town were farmers. After the Second World War, the Carmelite Fathers were entrusted with the spiritual needs of the community. The Carmelite Fathers arrived in Fgura on 14 December 1945, where they built a new church and convent, which were inaugurated in November 1950, in the presence of Prime Minister Enrico Mizzi. Before Fgura was declared a parish on 21 January 1965, it was a suburb of Tarxien.

Lying inland from the Three Cities, Fgura was influenced by the growth of the Malta Dockyards, especially after World War II. Much of Fgura was built around the 1960s and 1980s.

The first official document referring to Fgura as a locality was the Malta Census of 1967.

As the population grew, the need arose for the building of a new modern church. The new church was inaugurated on 25 May 1988 and was consecrated by Archbishop Joseph Mercieca on 1 February 1990.

== Demographics ==
The population of Fgura was 13,886 in July 2024. This included 7,103 males and 6,783 females; 11,314 Maltese nationals and 2,572 foreign nationals.

== Fgura Local Council ==
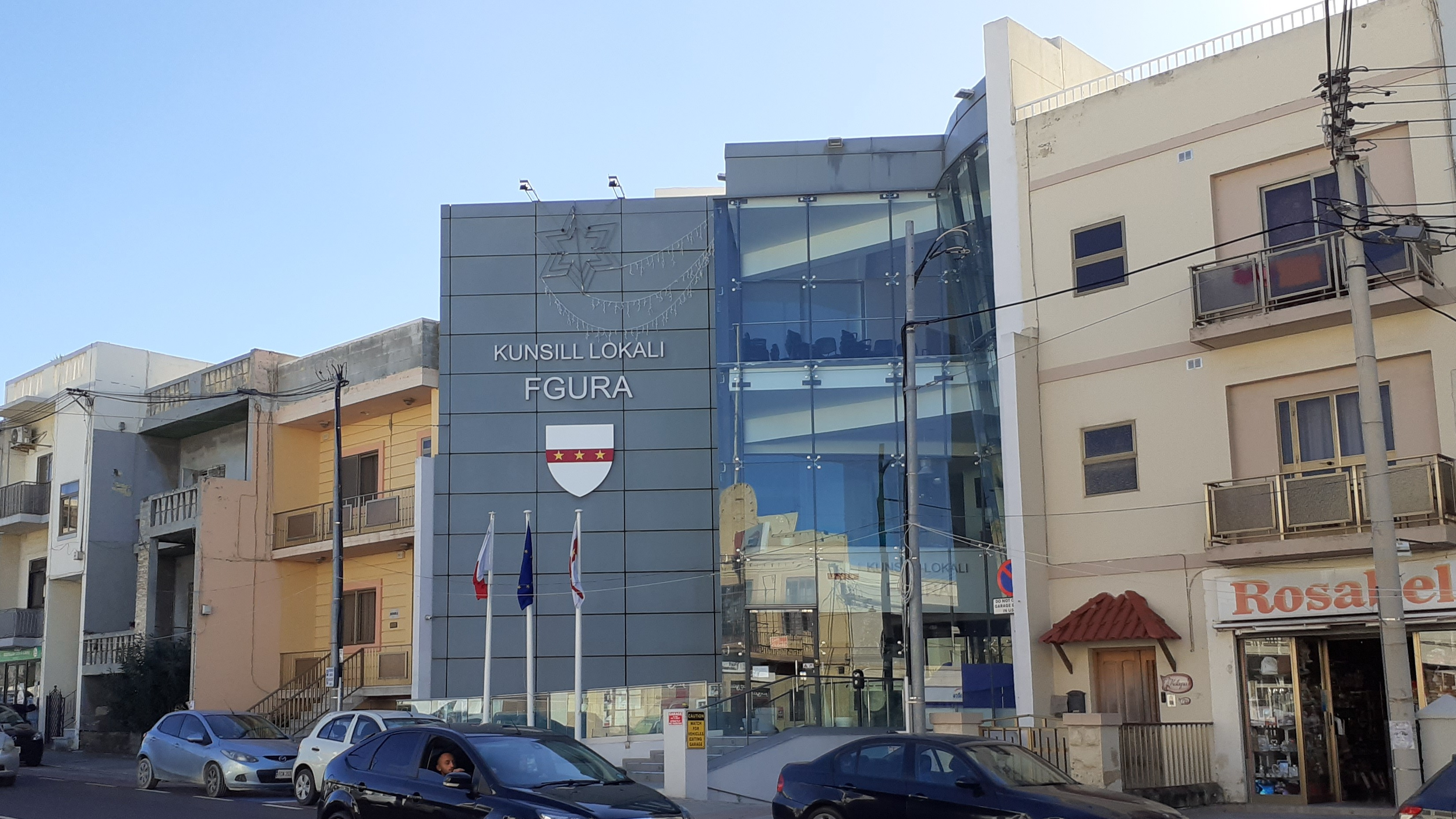
Fgura Local Council building, inaugurated in late 2018

Local Councils in Malta were established through legislation in Parliament in July 1993. The first local election in Fgura was held on 16 April 1994, and successive elections were held every three years on the 2nd Saturday of March. The first mayor of Fgura was Anthony Degiovanni. He was replaced by Saviour Camilleri in 1997, but returned to his post on 1 April 2000. However Anthony Degiovanni resigned from office in 2004, and was succeeded by Darren Marmara.

The 6th Fgura Local Council elections were held on 6 June 2009. The incumbent mayor, Darren Marmara was confirmed for the 3rd consecutive time. However, on 7 July 2010 the deputy mayor Anthony Degiovanni together with his fellow labour councillors presented a no confidence motion in the incumbent mayor, Darren Marmara. The motion was due to be discussed on 16 July, but when the local council meeting was about to commence, the mayor resigned from office, saying that in the preceding days, he and his family received various threats. No official reason was given why the mayor was forced to resign. A meeting to elect a new mayor, scheduled for 21 July had to be postponed till 3 August, after a decision by the Department of Local councils, that found that there were irregularities in the way the meeting was summoned. Newcomer Byron Camilleri, a 23-year-old law student was nominated as the fourth mayor of Fgura.

Byron Camilleri was confirmed mayor for a second term, after the elections held on 9 March 2013, but eventually resigned his seat, after he was elected in Parliament in June 2017. Pierre Dalli succeeded Byron Camilleri, and was reconfirmed as Mayor in May 2019 after obtaining the majority of votes. The new deputy mayor is Clayton Portelli Cascun. The other members of the council are: Charles Bonello, Raymond Deguara, Ryan Ellul, Mario Fava, Mark Lombardo, Toshera Schembri and Adrian Tanti. Mark Lombardo is the only councillor who was elected in all local council elections held since they were established in 1993. As of now, Clayton Cascun Portelli is now the Mayor as of the 2024 Local Council elections and the vice mayor being Darren Marmara. Other Local councilors elected are Charles Bonello, Ray Deguara, Mark Lombardo, Izak Catania De Giovanni, Josianne Scicluna, Dr.Ryan Ellul and Adrian Tanti. The local councilor Izak Catania De Giovanni has reached a record during this term being the youngest local councilor ever elected in Malta's history and being the newcomer with the largest number of votes with 729 votes on Count 4 only being 16 years old and 114 days. He is also the youngest politician in Europe ever elected with a democratic vote. Josianne Scicluna is the only female elected and she is the only female as a councilor in this council.

== Places of interest ==
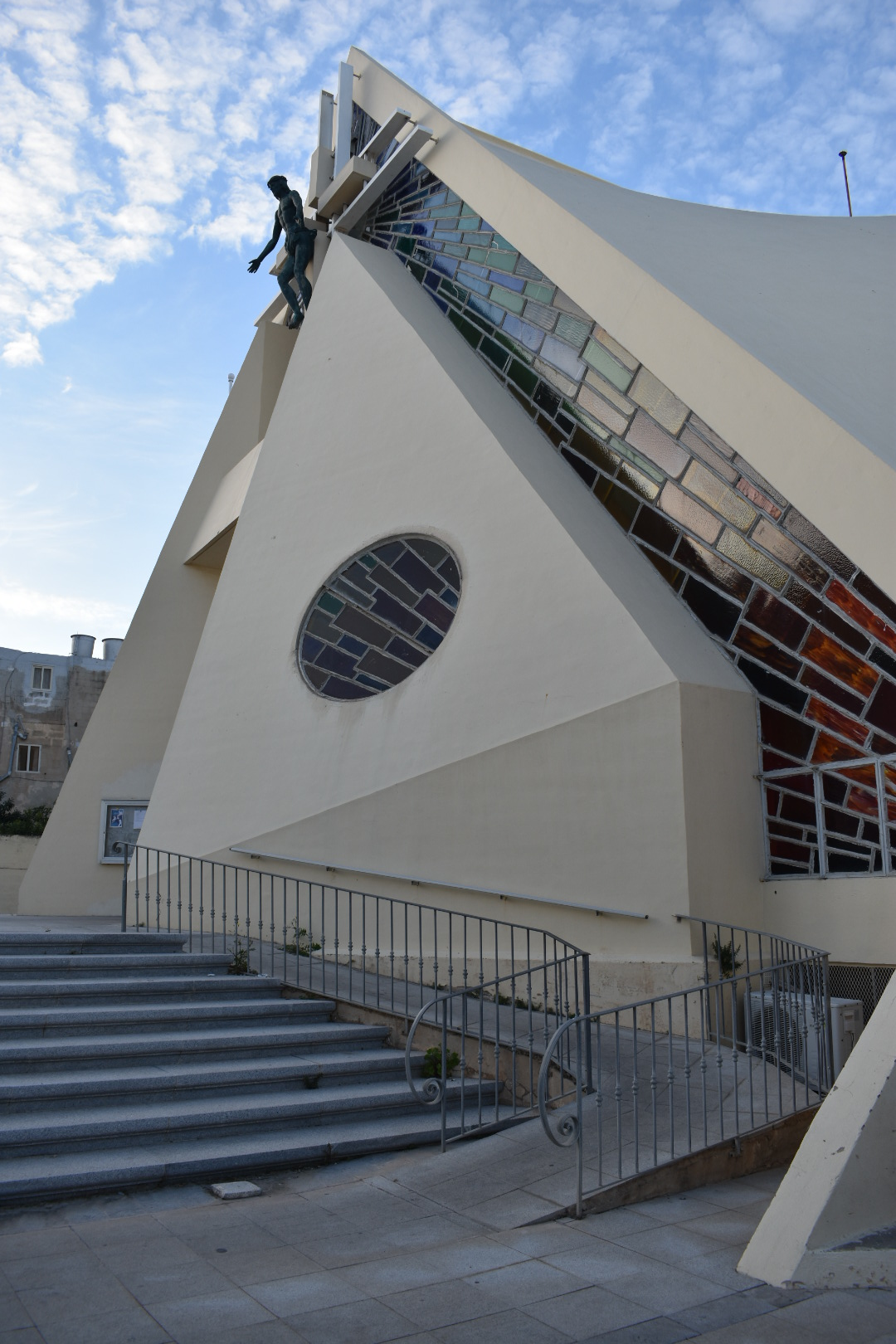
Our Lady of Mount Carmel Parish Church, Fgura

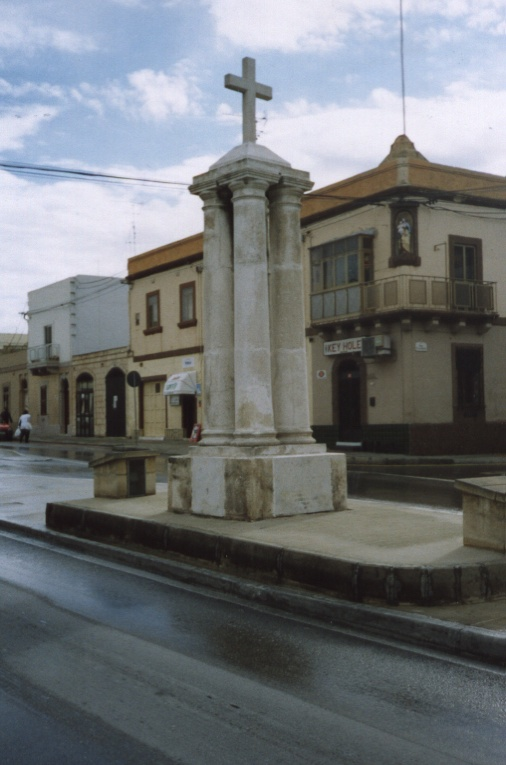
Il-Monument tas-Salib

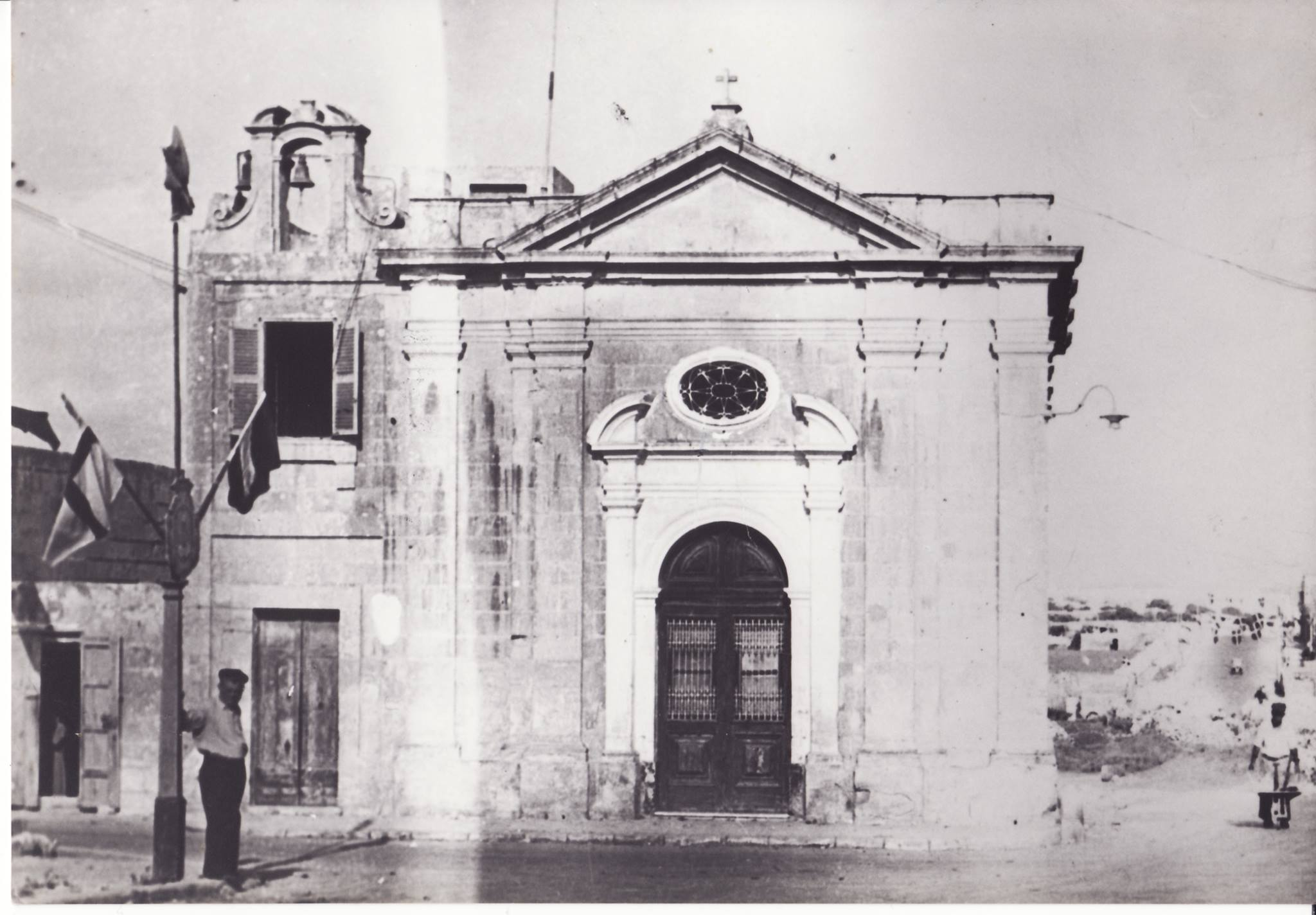
Old chapel "tal-Karmnu, demolished in the 1950s

=== Parish Church of Our Lady of Mount Carmel ===
The parish church of Fgura was built in 1988 and dedicated to Our Lady of Mount Carmel on 1 February 1990, on a project by architect Victor Muscat Inglott and structural engineer Godfrey Azzopardi from the 1960s. The parish church is built in modern, post-Vatican II Council style, with a ceiling supported at four points to provide a symmetrical cross design, while retaining a square plan at the base across both axis. It was meant to be appreciated as a free-standing structure surrounded by open space. The Fgura parish church is included in the 2011 National Inventory of the Cultural Property of the Maltese Islands under ID 00009.

=== The Cross Monument ===
There is a monument in Hompesch Street, which is known as 'Il-Monument tas-Salib' by the Fgura residents (The Cross Monument). This monument was inaugurated by Minister Ugo Mifsud Bonnici in February 1990, exactly when Fgura celebrated its 25th anniversary when it became a parish in 1965. This monument was designed by the sculptor Ġanni Bonnici and built by apprentices of the Ġlormu Cassar School.

This monument was placed on the exact spot where a small church dedicated to Our Lady of Mount Carmel was built in 1790 instead of a niche that was there for a long time. The church was demolished in the 1950s to allow the widening of the road. As a remembrance of this niche, a new niche was built in Carmel Street.

The monument rests on four columns and they have a significant meaning. Three of these columns represent the towns which Fgura is adjacent to:- Paola, Tarxien and Żabbar {limits from these places were taken in order to form the Parish of Fgura in 1965}. The other one represents the Parish of Fgura. At the base of this monument there are 4 gravestones. They represent the 25th anniversary since Fgura became a parish, the inauguration of this monument and one is a copy of another gravestone that was situated at the side of a church that was built in 1844. This gravestone was written in Latin and it told the story of this church.

=== Reggie Miller Square ===
Reggie Miller Square (Wesgħa Reggie Miller) is an open space decorated with palm trees to the right side of the Parish Church. The original site had been developed into a garden which was inaugurated on 28 March 1976 by Minister Lorry Sant. Reggie Miller was a trade unionist and the founder of the General Workers' Union, the strongest trade union in Malta. The original garden featured a fish pond and a sundial designed by Paul Ignatius Micallef. Fgura Local Council, on being established in 1993, had identified this space as one if its first projects and very soon developed it into an open plan square to the design of Vice Mayor Saviour Camilleri. The new square was inaugurated on 10 February 1996. In 1996 the Fgura Local Council erected a monument of Our Lady of Mount Carmel, which was designed and executed by Fgura sculptor Alfred Camilleri Cauchi.

=== Patri Redent Gauci Gardens ===
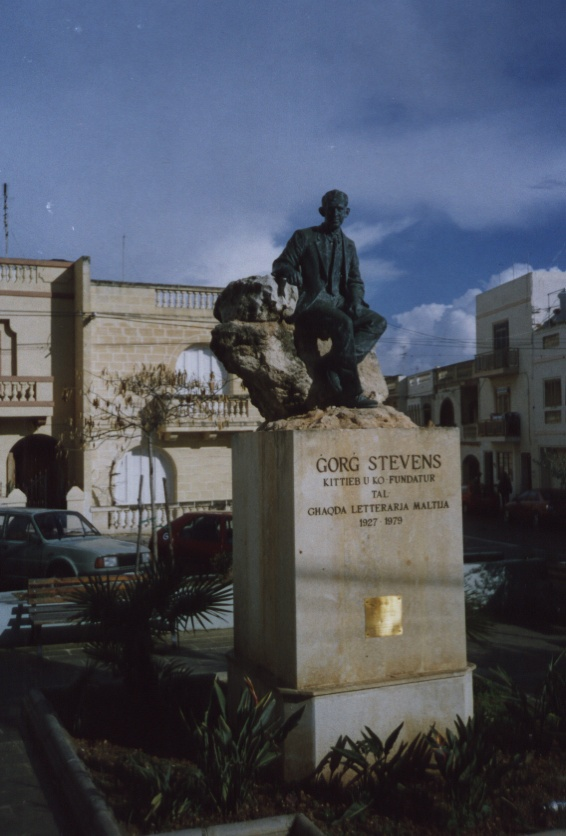
George Stevens' Monument

This garden was built in 2000 by the Ministry of Social Policy as part of the scheme of Gardens in Government Housing Estates. Fr Redent Gauci who was one of the original Carmelite friars that had started the Carmilte Community in Fgura, was eventually ordained Bishop. The council had intended this garden to be family leisure grounds and have incorporated a multipurpose court, a club house, and a playing field. The garden was inaugurated by Minister Lawrence Gonzi. As part of the embellishment works within the Housing Estate, the Local Council embellished also the immediate surroundings of the nearby apartments, both from its annual allocation, together with other funds from parking schemes by the Malta Environment and Planning Authority.

=== George Stevens Square ===
On 6 September 1986, the 35th anniversary of the foundation of the Malta Literary Society, Minister Lorry Sant inaugurated a monument commemorating George Stevens, poet, author of various popular songs and co-founder of the Literary Society. A hardline Malta Labour Party member by family tradition and a very intelligent man also self-made millionaire, Prof. George Stevens was a well loved character in the port area. Even though much controversy surrounds the facts of an Italian diplomat's murder whom Stevens confessed to. Still he was a hero to most in the southern part of Malta so a monument was erected The monument, erected in a square bearing his name, was commissioned by the Malta Literary Society and executed by sculptor Alfred Camilleri Cauchi. After the unveiling it was blessed by the Parish Priest Father Guido Micallef O. Carm. In 2000, the Fgura Local Council commissioned architect Stefan Buontempo to redesign this square and entrusted the original sculptor with the restoration of the monument and the design a new plinth. The project was inaugurated in 2001 in the presence of the Stevens family and members of the Malta Literary Society, by the President of Malta Guido de Marco.

=== Former Fgura farmhouse ===
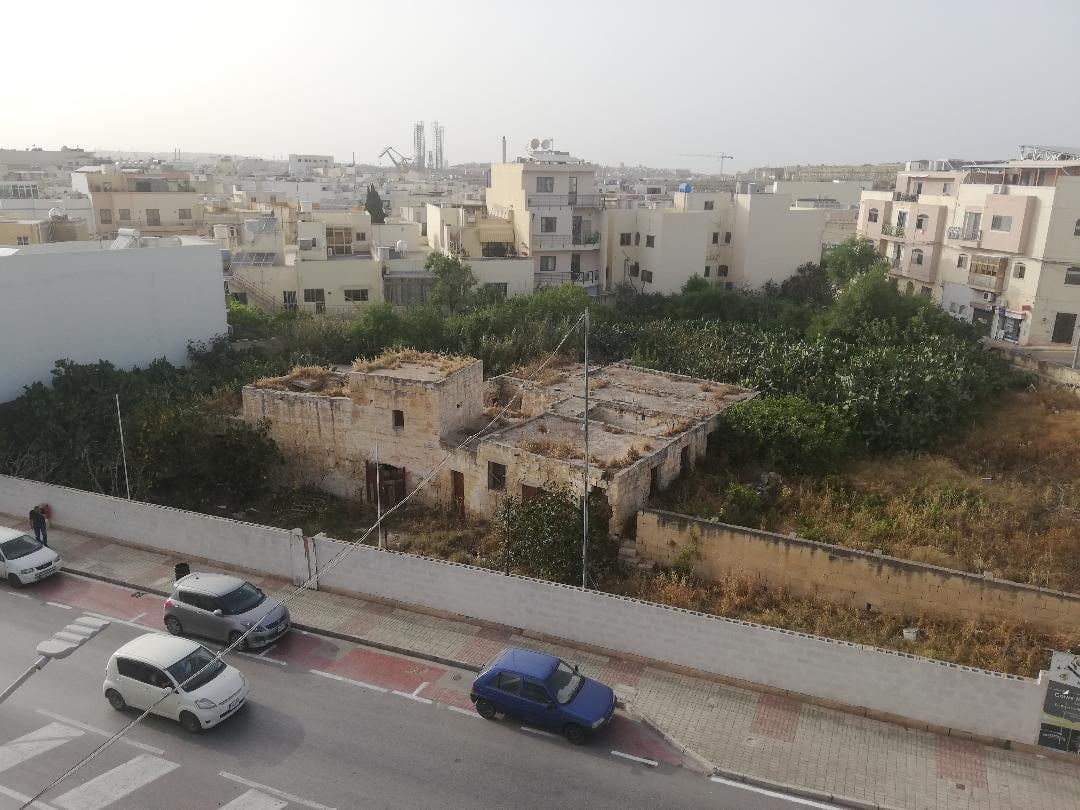
The Fgura farmhouse before demolition

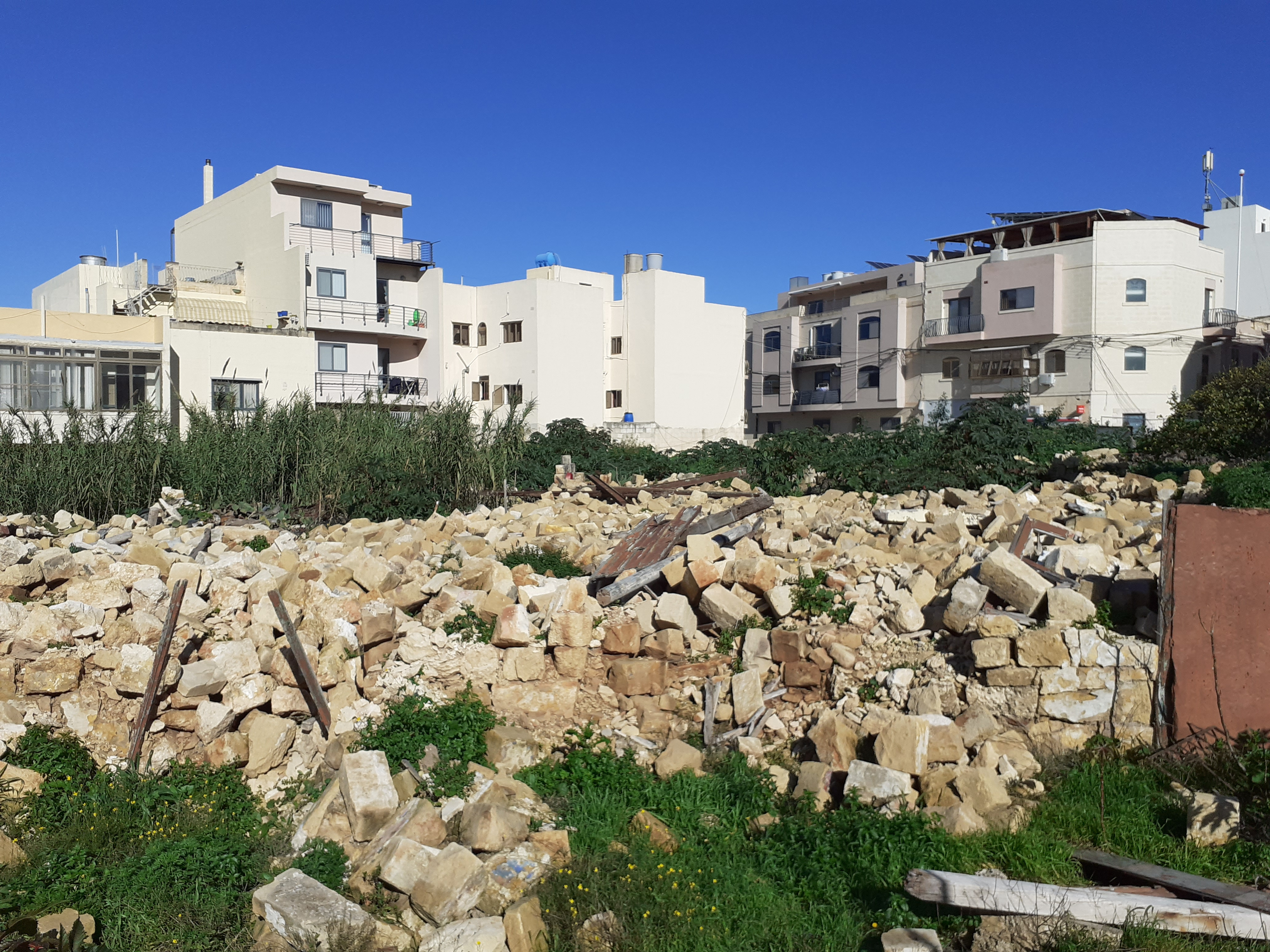
The ruins of Fgura's farmhouse after demolition in December 2021

An old farmhouse, from the early 1800s, used to stand at the crossroad of the original hamlet, in front of the former 1790 church (demolished in 1955). The farmhouse stood as the last of the fields and farmhouses owned by the 'Ficura' family that, according to notarial documents from 1505, gave its name to the later town. During the second world war, it was also the site of a Victory kitchen. By the 1990s, it was the oldest building in town, surrounded by the last fields and trees in Fgura's urban core, and the last remaining element of Fgura's history and identity.

The old farmhouse incorporated a religious niche - which gives the name to a nearby street - and several vernacular features, including xorok, kileb, animal stalls and mangers, a barumbara, and carved decorations. In 1995 Fgura Local Council had won Grade 3 protection for the farmhouse, and expressed its wish to restore it into a much-needed public cultural centre and green open space.

Malta's Environmental and Planning Authority refused developers' requests to de-schedule Fgura's old farmhouse in 2009, 2011 and 2015. Yet, in February 2019, without warning, Malta's Environment Planning Review Tribunal granted the de-scheduling requested by Robert Musumeci, appearing for Landscape Properties, who claimed the historical building had been modified across time and was now out of context, having been surrounded by modern buildings. The farmhouse was razed to the ground in 2021. Applications for a massive residential development are now being evaluated by Malta's Planning Authority.

=== Wied Blandun ===
Wied Blandun is the only natural area included in the limits of Fgura, and one of the few remaining open spaces in the conurbation around the Three Cities. It lies immediately outside the western part of the Cottonera Lines and south of the Bormla drydocks. Wied Blandun is part of the drowned valley system of the Grand Harbour area; with a length of circa 500 metres, it is irrigated by rainwater run-off from the streets of Paola and Fgura. It comprises terraced fields and the area closest to the road which leads to Fgura includes an important stand of carobs and almonds. The valley has long been subject to important environmental degradation, being used in its lower (northern) part as dumping ground for hazardous grit blasting waste from the nearby shipyards.

In November 2001 the Malta Environment and Planning Authority scheduled Wied Blandun for its scientific and ecological importance among the Protected areas of Malta. In 2015 the Maltese government allocated €125,000 for an environmental study for the rehabilitation of the valley, to include a desk study, a site description and a preliminary risk assessment, with the aim of the rehabilitation and restoration of Wied Blandun, as confirmed by Paola MP Silvio Parnis, head of the consultative council for the south of Malta.

An EU-funded catchment management study and masterplan were published in December 2020 and March 2021 respectively.

== Fgura United Football Club ==
Fgura United is the local football club and it officially represents the locality of Fgura in Maltese football. In 2012, Fgura Utd FC were promoted to the Second Division, after an eventful season for the local sports club. This was the second time that the club was promoted to a higher division, after the first success registered in the season 1987/88. On 31 March 2012, the Fgura Utd Sports complex was inaugurated by Prime Minister Lawrence Gonzi and UEFA President, Michel Platini.

== 16 July External Feast Commission ==
The External Feast Commission 16 July, or as it is better known in Maltese; Kummissjoni Festa Esterna 16 ta' Lulju is under the auspices of the Fgura Parish Church. This commission was founded in 1993 under the auspices of Fr. Adrian Cassar Pulis O.Carm. Different activities are held during the year as a means of fund raising. These funds are spent on the expenses incurred in organizing the village feast on the second Sunday of July. The Village Feast of Fgura is dedicated to Our Lady of Mount Carmel. On 5 March 2023, Kummissjoni Festa Esterna celebrated 30 years of success and work to organise the village feast in Fgura, and celebrated with a new logo.

== Scout Group ==
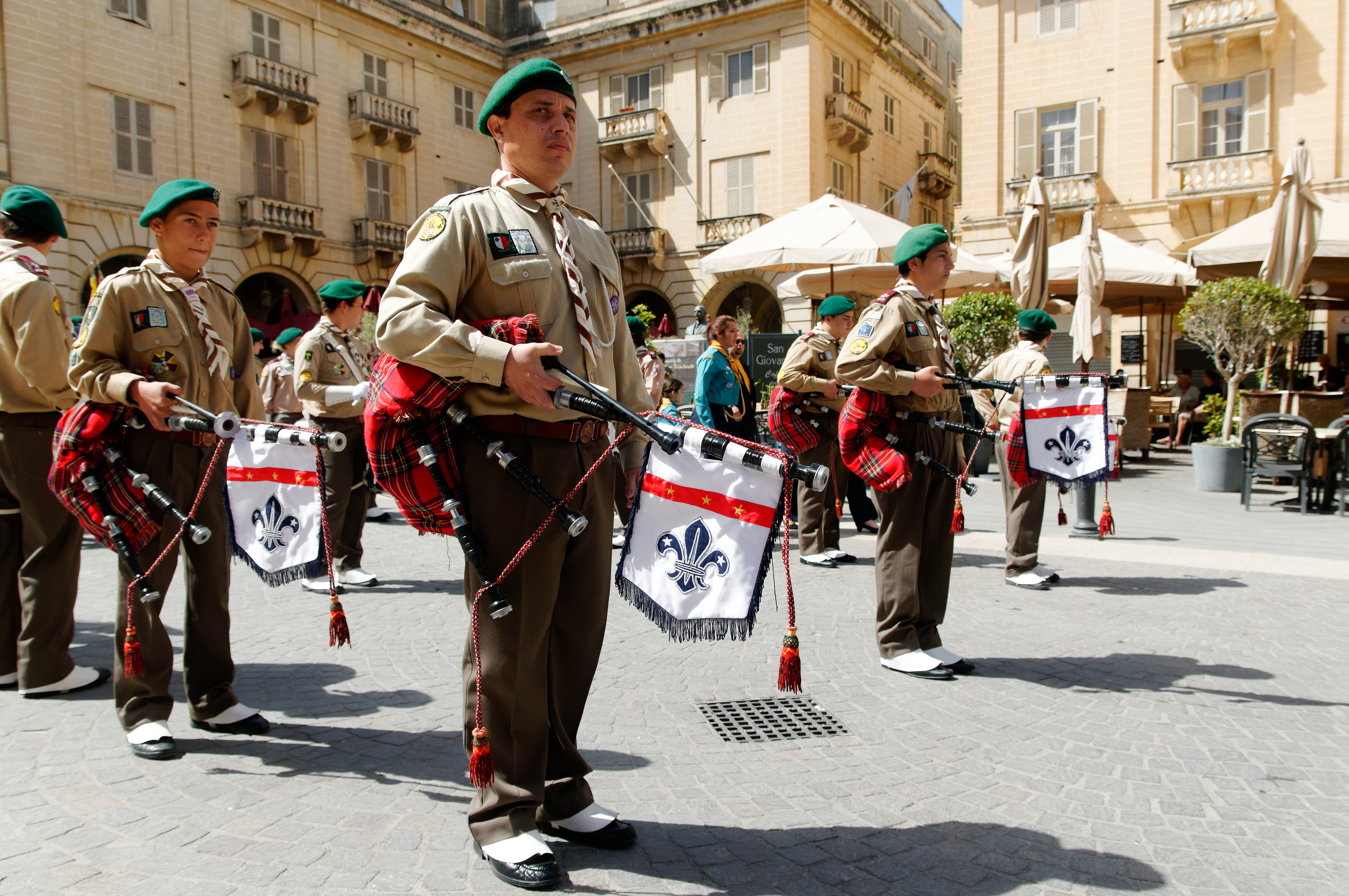
Fgura scouts at the 2012 annual parade

The Fgura Scout Group was established in 1987 is a member of the South District of the Scout Association of Malta. They currently have about 100 Uniformed Members in 4 Co-ed Sections. A Beaver section (ages 5–7) a Cub Scout section (ages 7–10), a Troop Section (ages 10–15), a Venture Unit ages (15–18) and a Rover Crew (18–25). The Group also has a marching band composed of members from the group's sections. Apart from the local and national activities, the Group also participates in overseas activities and frequently hosts the First Woodend Scout Group of Bristol-UK for their traditional exchange visits.

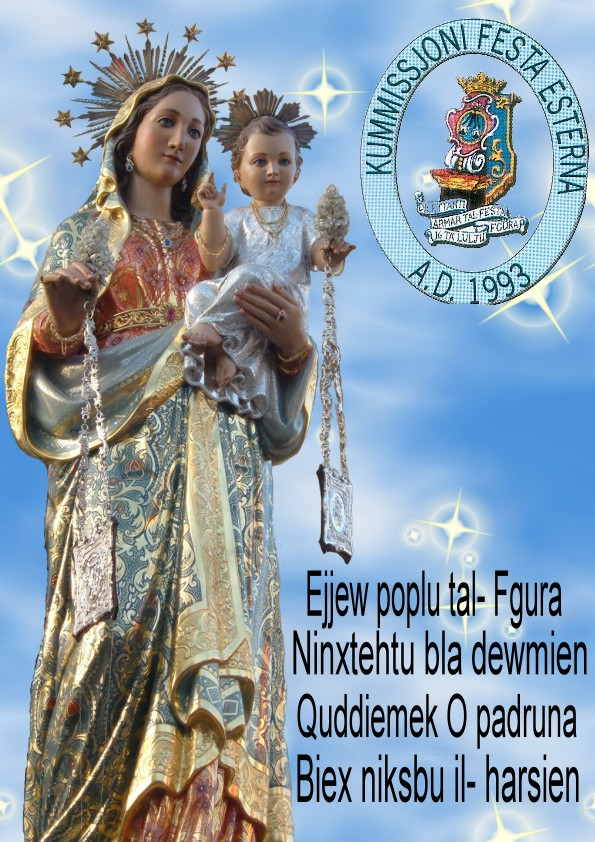
Poster for the External Feast Commission

In 2005, 11 scouts and 1 leader attended EuroJam 2005 (European Jamboree) in Chelmsford, UK this year being the 100th anniversary of scouting. In November 2017, the Fgura Scout Group celebrated its 30th anniversary and organised a special group camp for the occasion. In 2015 and 2019 a contingent of scouts and ventures from the Fgura Scout Group took part in the Haarlem Jamborette, held in The Netherlands.

== Band Club ==
Our Lady of Carmel Society and Band Club (L-Għaqda Mużikali u s-Soċjali Madonna tal-Karmnu) was founded in 1985. Its premises in Hompesch Road were inaugurated in 1991. Teaching of musical instruments for free is one of the main goals of this band club, whilst the Band takes active part in the organisation of all local festivities throughout the year, and which reach their climax during the second week of July, when the titular feast of Our Lady of Mount Carmel is celebrated.

== Schools in Fgura ==
Immediately after the end of World War II, in 1944, Mons. Ġużepp Zerafa, a Carmelite Frair, the same one who had charge of the chapel of Our Lady of Mount Carmel, took the initiative and applied to the Director of Education, Mr. Brennan, to open a school in Fgura. Permission was granted, and the Director of Education authorised Mr. E.B.Vella to open the school.

Today, there are two Primary schools in Fgura. They form part of St. Thomas More College. One of the Primary schools is named after Dun Ġużepp Żerafa himself, while the second school is named after Emanuel Debono Decesare.

Dun Ġużepp Żerafa Primary A school is a state school for Kindergarten and Years 1, 2 and 3, named after the priest who in 1944 took the initiative and applied to open a school in Fgura. The school population consists of around 200 kindergarten pupils and 340 Primary pupils. The school is situated in Triq il-Kitba.

Fgura Primary B School, situated in Carmel Street and named after the first headmaster, Emanuel Debono Decesare, hosts nearly 400 pupils from Fgura and the neighbouring areas.

== Zones in Fgura ==
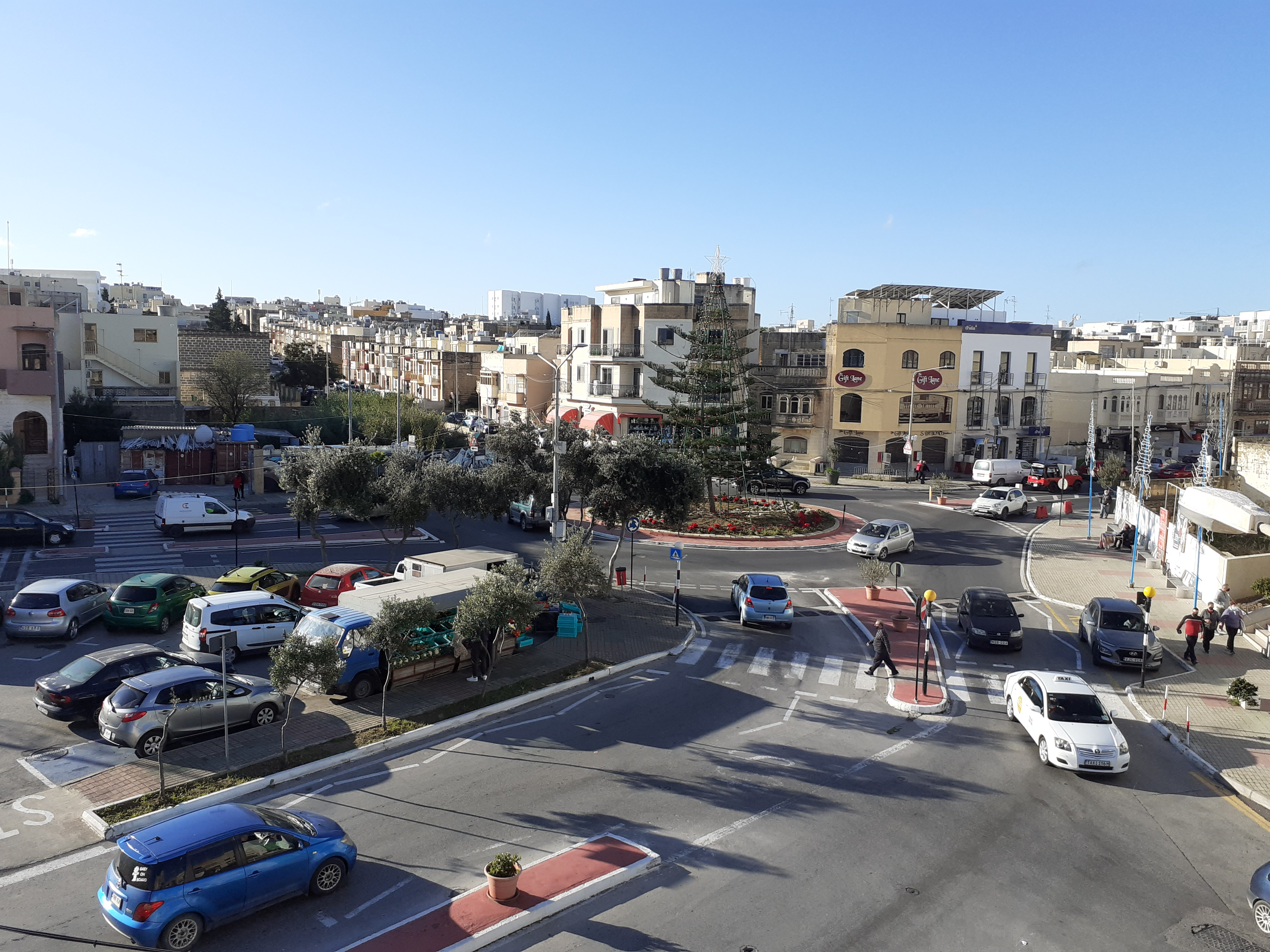
Main Fgura roundabout

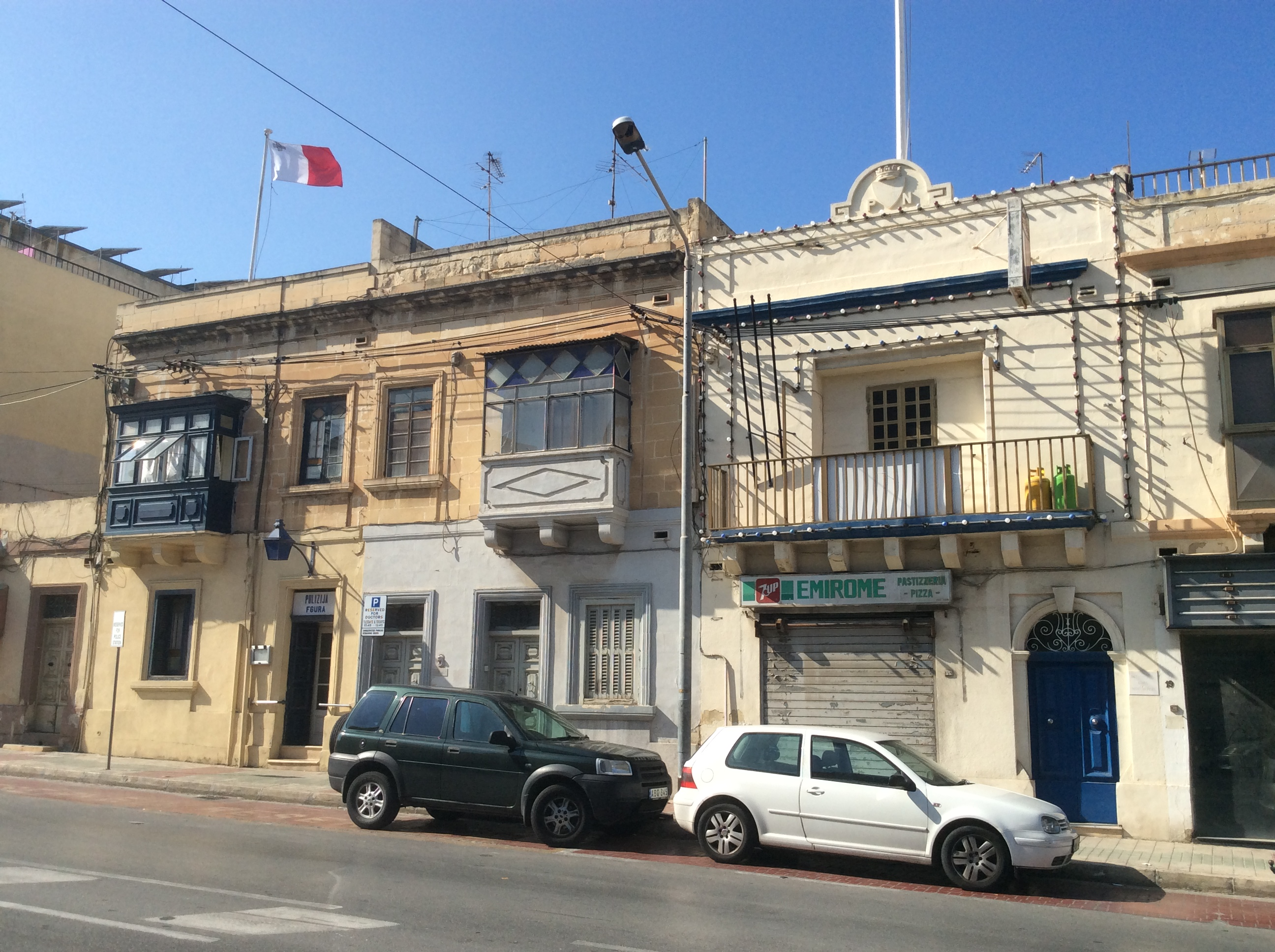
Police station and PN club

- Wied Blandun
- Tal-Liedna
- Ta' Ġerman
- Ta' Penza
- Ta' Tira
- Tal-Foss
- Tal-Gallu
- Tal-Patri
- Tax-Xemx u l-Qamar
- Taz-Zilfa
