= The Boat (2018 film) =

2018 Maltese-British film

- Directed by: Winston Azzopardi
- Written by: Joe Azzopardi; Winston Azzopardi
- Produced by: Joe Azzopardi; Winston Azzopardi; Roy Boulter
- Starring: Joe Azzopardi
- Cinematography: Marek Traskowski
- Edited by: Daniel Lapira
- Music by: Lachlan Anderson
- Production companies: Latina Pictures; Hurricane Films
- Distributed by: Central City Media (UK)
- Release dates: August 2018 (Fantastic Fest); 22 February 2019
- Running time: 88 minutes
- Countries: Malta; United Kingdom
- Language: English
- Budget: 5,000,000$
- Box office: 98,559$

The Boat is a 2018 Maltese-British thriller drama film directed by Winston Azzopardi and written by Joe Azzopardi and Winston Azzopardi. Joe Azzopardi is the only cast member, and the film has very few spoken lines.

== Plot ==
The film stars Joe Azzopardi as a lone sailor who finds an abandoned sailboat. Out of curiosity, he approaches the abandoned sailboat, ties his boat to it and jumps aboard and checks the sailboat to learn that there is no one present. He comes outside to realize that his boat is gone and nowhere in sight. He goes to the deck and when he is about to urinate, one of the sails hits him and he almost goes overboard before he catches the railing in time and jumps back to the deck.

He then goes to the bathroom instead but the door closes on its own. To his horror he realizes that the door will not open despite his best efforts. He finds a small window and opens it to find a Cargo ship passing by. He panics in fear of a collision between the sailboat and the cargo ship, and he tries to open the door, but in vain. He finds a rope hanging outside the bathroom window and throws it in the water which eventually tangles with the propeller and slows down the sailboat. The rope gets stuck around his throat, strangling Joe. He manages to get the rope loose, but he passes out on the bathroom floor. When he awakes he manages to hoist the sail. After some time he finds that the rope is cut off, and that water level is rising by each passing minute. The sailboat gets into a storm and while the bathroom is filling up with water he tries to cut loose the other sail, which he eventually manages. He closes the small window and waits the storm out. He falls asleep.

The next morning he is still alive and his bathroom has not flooded yet. With nothing else to do, he tries to kick open the door again. He hears a sound and sees that the door is not locked anymore. He quickly escapes and goes to the deck where he finds some sort of buoys which he ties to the broken door in fear of his boat sinking. He puts this newly created makeshift boat in the water and gets on it. After some time however the sailboat does not seem to be sinking, so the man gets onboard again. He manages to create a pump to get the water out.

After some time he sees a ship in the distance so he quickly gets on his makeshift boat to paddle to the ship in the distance. However, he notices that the sailboat follows him. He jumps into the water off of his makeshift boat, right before the sailboat hits him.

It starts getting dark. Now that the sailboat is gone as well as his makeshift boat, he floats in the sea to find some dolphins swimming near him. It is now night, and he has some friendly interactions with the dolphins. To his horror he turns around to find that the Sailboat has come back. Without anything else to do, he is able to get onto and into the sailboat and goes to another bathroom where he falls asleep.

The next morning he finds that now also the door to the sleeping area is locked. He finds a small hatch which leads him into a small storage area. The small door which he entered suddenly shuts and he is trapped again. Meanwhile, the sailboat nears a sea town. The man sees the town through the window and tries to open it, but the window doesn't budge.

Then, the small door through which he had entered swings open and the man goes outside to find the sleeping area door unlocked again. He disembarks the sailboat and wanders around the sea town. He explores a few abandoned buildings, and then notices that the sailboat has almost intelligent behaviour. The sailboat sails away and disappears. He walks around until he discovers his own boat which he had lost earlier, tied on the shore. The man finds himself back on the island where he started his journey.

The camera follows into a water cave and through a small opening in the cave, the open ocean can be seen. And on there the mysterious sailboat is seen for one last time.

== Production ==
The Boat is Winston Azzopardi's first feature film. Produced by Latina Pictures, The Boat is based on a short film Head, for which the Azzopardis picked up the Best Short Film award at the Rome Film Festival in 2016.

The film was shot at the Malta Film Studios water tanks and around the coast of Malta. The first scene was shot in Dwejra Inland Sea, Gozo. The film was shot over 22 days, two identical Beneteau First 45F5 sailboats were used. Filming began on 8 October 2017 and wrapped on 3 November.

== Release ==
The film premiered at 2018 Fantastic Fest in Austin, Texas. It was also shown at private viewings during the Cannes Film Festival in 2018, through which it secured a number of international distribution deals.

=== Reception ===
The Boat received a 78% critics rating on Rotten Tomatoes. The Hollywood Reporter called the film "unique". The Times of Malta gave it a positive review, describing it as a "a discomfiting and chilling ride," and praising the actor's ability to "[project] the man’s myriad emotions with consummate ease," despite having "sparse dialogue to work with." Although there is no dialogue in the film, it has been described as having a "clever, twisting, dialogue-free screenplay".

== Awards ==
For The Boat, Winston Azzopardi was nominated for Best Director at the 2019 National Film Awards UK.
