= Malta Film Studios =

Film studio complex in Kalkara, Malta

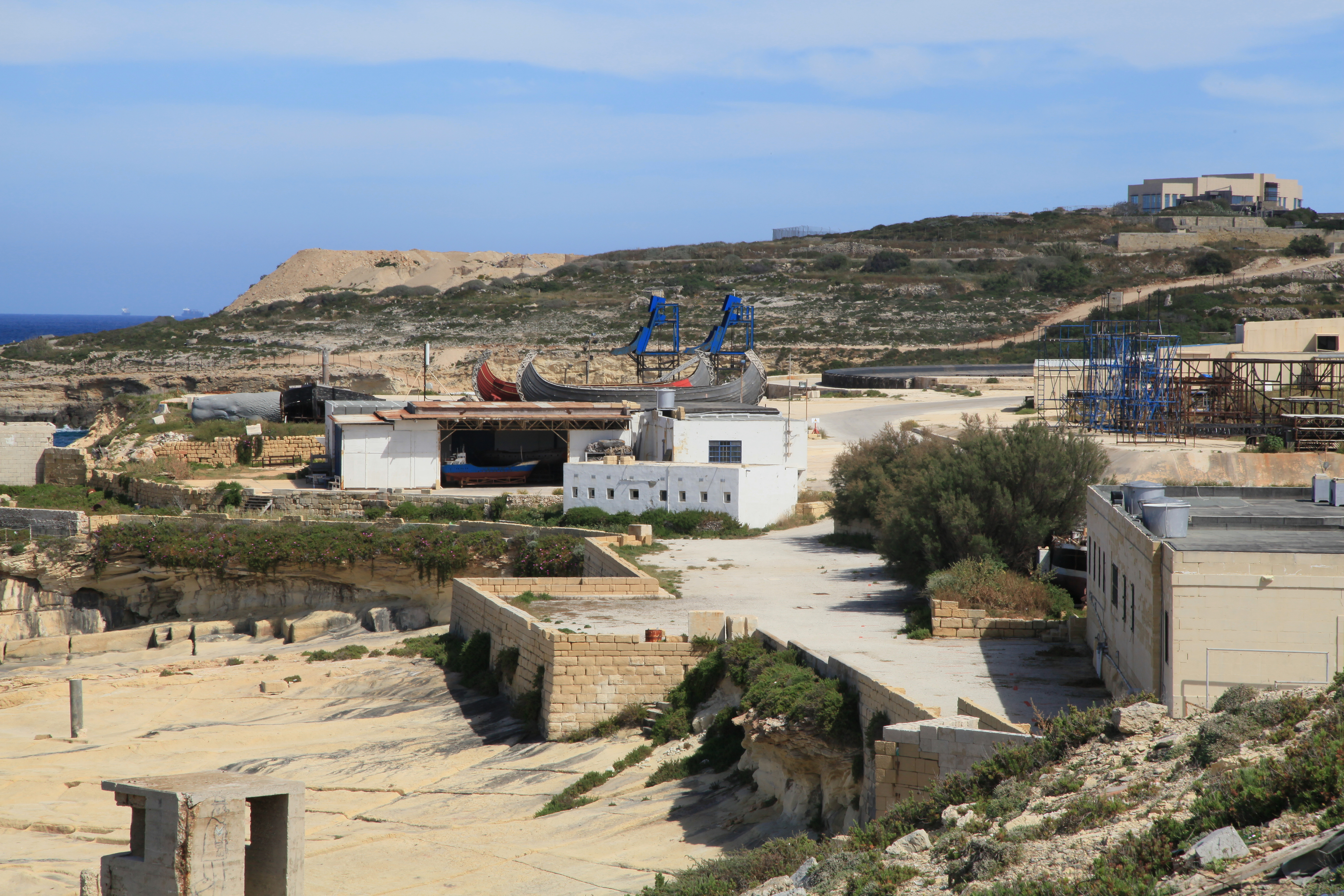
Mediterranean Film Studios as photographed in 2014

Malta Film Studios (MFS) (formerly known as Mediterranean Film Studios) is a film studio complex located in Kalkara, Malta. It is known for its large water tanks designed for maritime and underwater filming, its special effects water facility.

== History ==
The studios originated from a plan in 1963 by British special effects specialist Jim Hole and Maltese construction manager Paul Avellino to build a shallow water tank near Fort Rinella for controlled maritime filming. The first tank was constructed in 1964 and was initially used for the film The Bedford Incident (1965).

Originally known as Malta Film Facilities, the site was rebranded as Mediterranean Film Studios in 1978. A second deep tank was built in 1979 for Raise the Titanic (1980). Over the years, ownership shifted between private and public hands, with the facility eventually operated by the Maltese government and renamed Malta Film Studios.

The studios have a history spanning over 60 years, attracting international productions due to Malta's climate and facilities.

== Facilities ==
Malta Film Studios features three water tanks: two large exterior horizon tanks and one indoor tank. These allow for open-sea illusions and controlled special effects.

- Shallow Exterior Tank: Built in 1964, approximately 91m × 122m × 1.8m deep (with a 4m center pit), used primarily for surface filming and storm effects.
- Deep Exterior Tank: Built in 1979, up to 36ft deep, used for underwater shooting with high water clarity.
- Indoor Tank: Smaller insert tank for controlled environments.

According to the European Film Academy, the exterior tanks blend with the natural sea horizon and are among the largest in the world.

== Notable productions ==
Over 100 international films and series have utilized the studios, particularly for water scenes. Notable examples include:

- The Bedford Incident (1965)
- Orca (1977)
- Raise the Titanic (1980)
- Popeye (1980)
- Clash of the Titans (1981)
- Christopher Columbus (miniseries) (1985)
- White Squall (1996)
- U-571 (2000)
- The Count of Monte Cristo (2002)
- Captain Phillips (2013)
- Parts of Game of Thrones (2011)
- Assassin's Creed (2016)

The nearby Fort Ricasoli has also been used in conjunction with the studios for films like Gladiator (2000) and its sequel.

- The Jurassic World Rebirth filming moved to the Malta Film Studios in July 2024.

== Dreams, Plans ==
Reported in Variety in 2025 "Why Malta would be a ‘dream’ location for the next James Bond movie," Johann Grech, film commissioner and CEO of Malta Film Studios said: “I hope we’ll have the opportunity...It’s an ambition, it’s a dream.”

In Jan 2026, it was reported, on plans, looking forward, that "Malta’s ambitions are anchored in a major infrastructure project: the approval and development of the Malta Film Studios masterplan, which will include the first global Land-Sea Super Stage."
