= Carmen (2021 film) =

2021 film by Valerie Buhagiar

- Theatrical release poster
- Directed by: Valerie Buhagiar
- Written by: Valerie Buhagiar
- Produced by: Pierre Ellul; Coral Aiken; Anika Psaila Savona
- Starring: Natascha McElhone; Steven Love; Michela Farrugia; Peter Galea; Pauline Fenech; André Agius; Rachel Fabri; Mikhail Basmadjian; Paul Cilia; Henry Zammit Cordina; Paul Portelli; Richard Clarkin
- Cinematography: Diego Guijarro
- Edited by: Matt Lyon; Peter Strauss
- Production companies: Falkun Films; Aiken Heart Films
- Distributed by: Vortex Media
- Release dates: December 4, 2021 (Whistler); August 19, 2022 (Canada); September 21, 2022 (Malta)
- Running time: 87 minutes (North American version); 90 minutes (European version)
- Countries: Canada; Malta
- Languages: English; Maltese

Carmen is a 2021 drama film written and directed by Valerie Buhagiar. Inspired in part by the real experiences of Buhagiar's own aunt Rita, the film stars Natascha McElhone as Carmen, a Maltese spinster who has spent her adult life serving as a caretaker for her brother, who is a Roman Catholic priest, but who finds herself feeling free to explore her own desires and goals in life as she nears age 50. The cast also includes Steven Love, Michaela Farrugia, Peter Galea, Mikhail Basmadjian, Henry Zammit Cordina, and Richard Clarkin.

Shot in Malta in 2019, the film was screened for distributors in the Industry Selects program at the 2021 Toronto International Film Festival, but was not made available to the general public. It had its public premiere at the 2021 Whistler Film Festival, where Diego Guijarro won the award for Best Cinematography in a Borsos Competition film. In 2022, it was screened at the Canadian Film Festival in Toronto, where it won the award for Best Film. The film was released by Vortex Media in Canada in select theatres on August 19, 2022, and on video on demand on September 23, 2022. In Malta, it was released theatrically on September 21, 2022. In the United States, it was released theatrically in major cities and on video on demand on September 23, 2022, by Good Deed Entertainment.

It was selected as the Maltese entry for the Best International Feature Film at the 95th Academy Awards.

== Reception ==
On the review aggregator website Rotten Tomatoes, the film holds an approval rating of 100% based on reviews from 24 critics, with an average rating of 7/10. Metacritic, which uses a weighted average, assigned the film a score of 66 out of 100, based on 5 critics, indicating "generally favorable reviews".

== See also ==
- List of submissions to the 95th Academy Awards for Best International Feature Film
- List of Maltese submissions for the Academy Award for Best International Feature Film
