= First ladies and gentlemen of Malta =

Spouse of the president

First Gentleman of Malta
- L-Ewwel Raġel ta' Malta
- Flag of Malta
- Incumbent; Vacant since 24 July 2025
- Residence: San Anton Palace
- Inaugural holder: Margaret Mamo
- Formation: 13 December 1974

First Gentleman of Malta (L-Ewwel Raġel ta' Malta) or First Lady of Malta (Maltese: L-Ewwel Mara ta' Malta) is the title used to refer to the spouse of the current president of Malta, during the president's term in office. The recent titleholder was First Gentleman Anthony Spiteri Debono, who has held the position from April 4, 2024, to his death on July 24, 2025.

The president and their spouse reside at San Anton Palace.

== List of first ladies and gentlemen ==
This list includes all persons who have served as First Lady or First Gentleman.

| President No. | Portrait | First Lady/Gentleman | Tenure | President (Spouse, unless noted) |
|---|---|---|---|---|
| 1 | | Margaret Mamo | 13 December 1974 – 27 December 1976 | Anthony Mamo m. 1939 |
| 2 | | Margery Buttigieg | 27 December 1976 – 27 December 1981 | Anton Buttigieg m. 1975 |
| | | Acting First Lady; Marie Hyzler | 27 December 1981 – 15 February 1982 | Albert Hyzler |
Position vacant under President Agatha Barbara as she was never married
| | | Acting First Lady; Edwige Xuereb | 16 February 1987 – 4 April 1989 | Paul Xuereb |
| 4 | | Maria Tabone | 4 April 1989 – 4 April 1994 | Ċensu Tabone m. 1941 |
| 5 | | Gemma Mifsud Bonnici | 4 April 1994 – 4 April 1999 | Ugo Mifsud Bonnici m. 1959 |
| 6 | | Violet de Marco | 4 April 1999 – 4 April 2004 | Guido de Marco m. 1956 |
| 7 | | Mary Fenech Adami; 13 October 1933 – 8 July 2011 (aged 77) | 4 April 2004 – 4 April 2009 | Eddie Fenech Adami m. June 27, 1965 |
| 8 | | Margaret Abela; Born March 14, 1950 (age 76) | 4 April 2009 – 4 April 2014 | George Abela m. May 24, 1976 |
| 9 | | Edgar Preca | 4 April 2014 – 4 April 2019 | Marie Louise Coleiro Preca m. 2006 |
| 10 | | Miriam Vella | 4 April 2019 – 4 April 2024 | George Vella m. 1985 |
| 11 | | Anthony Spiteri Debono | 4 April 2024 – 24 July 2025 | Myriam Spiteri Debono |
