= Dimech =

Dimech is a Maltese surname. It may refer to:

- Francis Zammit Dimech (1954–2025), Maltese politician, member of the House of Representatives
- Jeanette Dimech, British-born Spanish singer, known by the mononym Jeanette
- Luke Dimech (born 1977), Maltese footballer
- Manwel Dimech (1860–1921), Maltese social reformer in pre-independence Malta, a philosopher, a journalist, and a writer
- Vincenzo Dimech (1768–1831), Maltese sculptor

== See also ==
- Manwel Dimech Bridge, a beam bridge at San Ġiljan, Malta
