= Manwel Dimech =

Maltese social revolutionary

Emmanuel Giovanni Salvatore Pietro Dimech
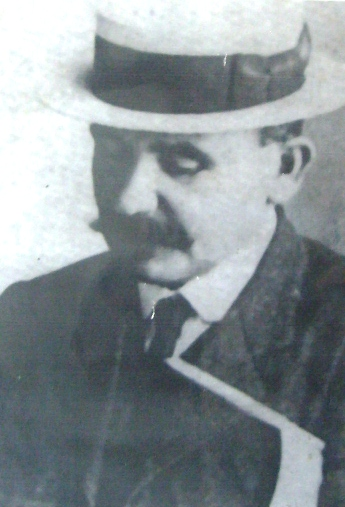
- Manwel Dimech in 1911
- Born: 25 December 1860; Valletta, Malta
- Died: 17 April 1921 (aged 60); Victoria College, Alexandria, Egypt.
- Resting place: Buried in an unmarked grave within the grounds of Victoria College, Alexandria, Egypt
- Monuments: Castille Place, Valletta, by Anton Agius, inaugurated on May 1, 1976.
- Occupations: Social reformer, philosopher, journalist, author and poet
- Years active: 1898–1914
- Organization: Ix-Xirka tal-Imdawlin (Society of the Enlightened)
- Known for: Social reform
- Notable work: Il-Bandiera tal-Maltin, Ivan u Prascovia, Aphorisms
- Spouse(s): Virginia née Agius (1872–1938); married: Stella Maris, Sliema, October 2, 1900
- Children: Manuel (1902–1902) Attilio (1903–1918); Ulissis (1904–1906); Sylvia (1906–1993); Evelyn (1908–1996) Ulissis (1912–1913)
- Parent(s): Carmelo Paolo Francesco Dimech (1836–1874) x Evangelista Testa née Zammit (1831–1900); married: St Paul Shipwreck, Valletta, October 2, 1855

Signature
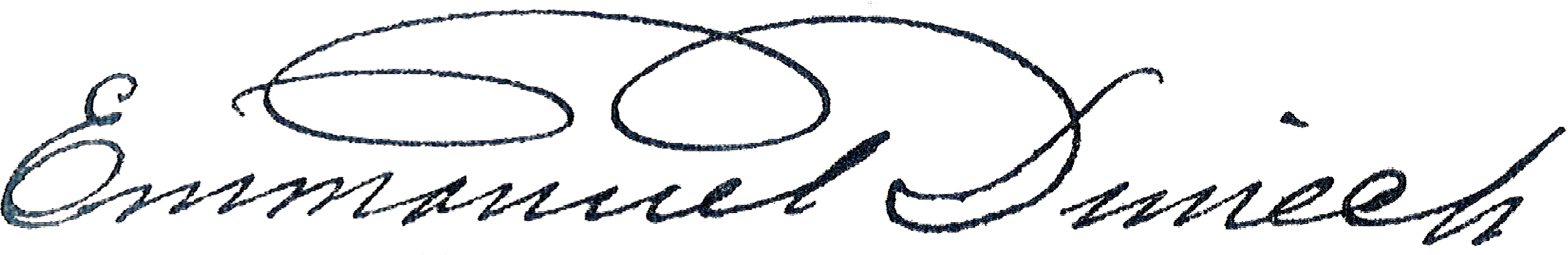

Emmanuel Giovanni Salvatore Pietro Dimech, also known as Manwel Dimech (25 December 1860 – 17 April 1921) was a Maltese socialist, philosopher, journalist, writer, poet and social revolutionary. Born in Valletta and brought up in extreme poverty and illiteracy, Dimech spent significant portions of his early life in the Maltese prison system, mostly on charges of petty theft. At the age of seventeen, Dimech was arrested for the crime of involuntary murder, and sentenced to seventeen years in jail. After being thrown in jail, Dimech started to educate himself and became a man of letters.

Upon his release from prison, Dimech became a teacher and publisher, becoming a major figure in the public life of Malta. Dimech spoke freely among the social issues facing the populace of Malta, earning him great support and popular approval. However, the ideas espoused by Dimech caused him to come into conflict with both the Catholic Church and the colonial government of Malta. After the Governor of Malta grew frustrated by Dimech's growing support among the Maltese populace, he was permanently exiled to Sicily, Italy. Dimech later moved to British-controlled Egypt, as it was the closest territory controlled by Britain at the time. Despite pleas from high-ranking British officials, Dimech was refused permission to return to Malta, and he died in Egypt in 1921.

== Early life ==
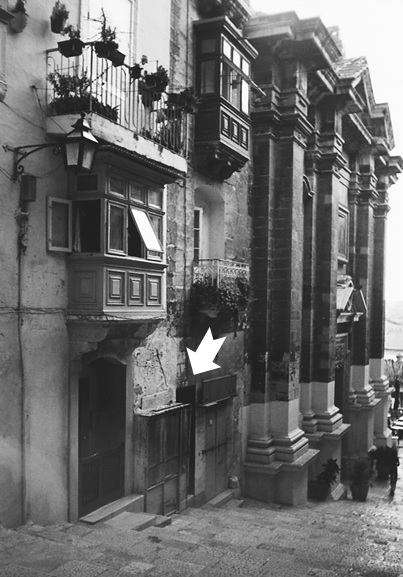
The place where Manuel Dimech was born on 25 December 1860 in St. John's Street, Valletta, Malta

Manuel Dimech was born on 25 December 1860, at St John Street, Valletta, Malta, and baptised at the church of St Paul Shipwreck, Valletta. His family was poor and lived in a single room that was part of a common tenement house with over sixty people. His ancestors on his father's side were genuine artistic sculptors, though up till Dimech's birth his family had fallen on difficult times. During his childhood, Dimech's family moved residence twice, leaving Valletta for Qormi (today Santa Venera), and then moving to Msida. His father tried hard to make ends meet, but his weak health prevented any success in this endeavour. He died at the age of 37, leaving his widow to care for their ten young children, along with four from her previous marriage to her widow, Salvatore Testa (1832–1855).

== Prison experience ==
Just a fortnight after his father's death the 13-year-old Dimech committed his first recorded crime of petty theft. He was a street urchin with no education, guidance or direction. For his first crime he was sent two days in a lockup. This experience did not stop him from delving deeper into a life of crime. Subsequently, he was to be sent nine more times to prison, sometimes for very serious crimes. Mostly it was for theft or burglary, but in 1878, when he was 17 years old, he committed involuntary murder, and was imprisoned for more than twelve years. In 1890, he was found guilty of forging counterfeit money (though he only traded it), and was imprisoned for a further seven years. He was released from prison in 1897 at the age of 36. In all, he was incarcerated for twenty years.

=== Education ===
While in prison, Dimech began to learn how to read and write in 1877 at the age of 17. He studied various subjects, including literature, grammar, politics, history, philosophy, and religion. He learned multiple languages, including Maltese, English, French, and Italian during his incarceration. This linguistic knowledge later enabled him to work as a language teacher. Dimech also developed an interest in politics, focusing on the structural causes of poverty and social inequality. These pursuits later influenced his contributions to public life.

=== Terror in prison ===
In prison Dimech had another kind of formation. During his last stint in prison between 1890 and 1897, a certain Marquis Giorgio Barbaro was appointed Commissioner of Prison. This man was considered a psychopath who made the life of prisoners vulnerable. He had tortured, murdered, persecuted and tormented prisoners ceaselessly. He also perjured his way into sending at least two prisoners to the gallows for crimes they had not committed. Dimech saw all this and lived through it with growing agony. The experience, together with the reading he was doing, moulded him into a daring, powerful and intrepid personality.

== Philosophy ==
Dimech adhered to a philosophy that he called 'of action', a position very close, though directly unrelated, to the contemporaneous pragmatism of the United States. He came at this position through his acquaintance with the philosophy of Jeremy Bentham, John Stuart Mill, and other British Empiricists and philosophers of utilitarianism. He claimed that actions can be considered right or wrong, and value judgments can be rightly gauged, according to whether they perform well when applied to practice. Actions, he maintained, proceed from the power that knowledge possesses from itself. Furthermore, actions are aimed at acquiring happiness, first, for the individual, and, simultaneously, for the whole community of individuals.

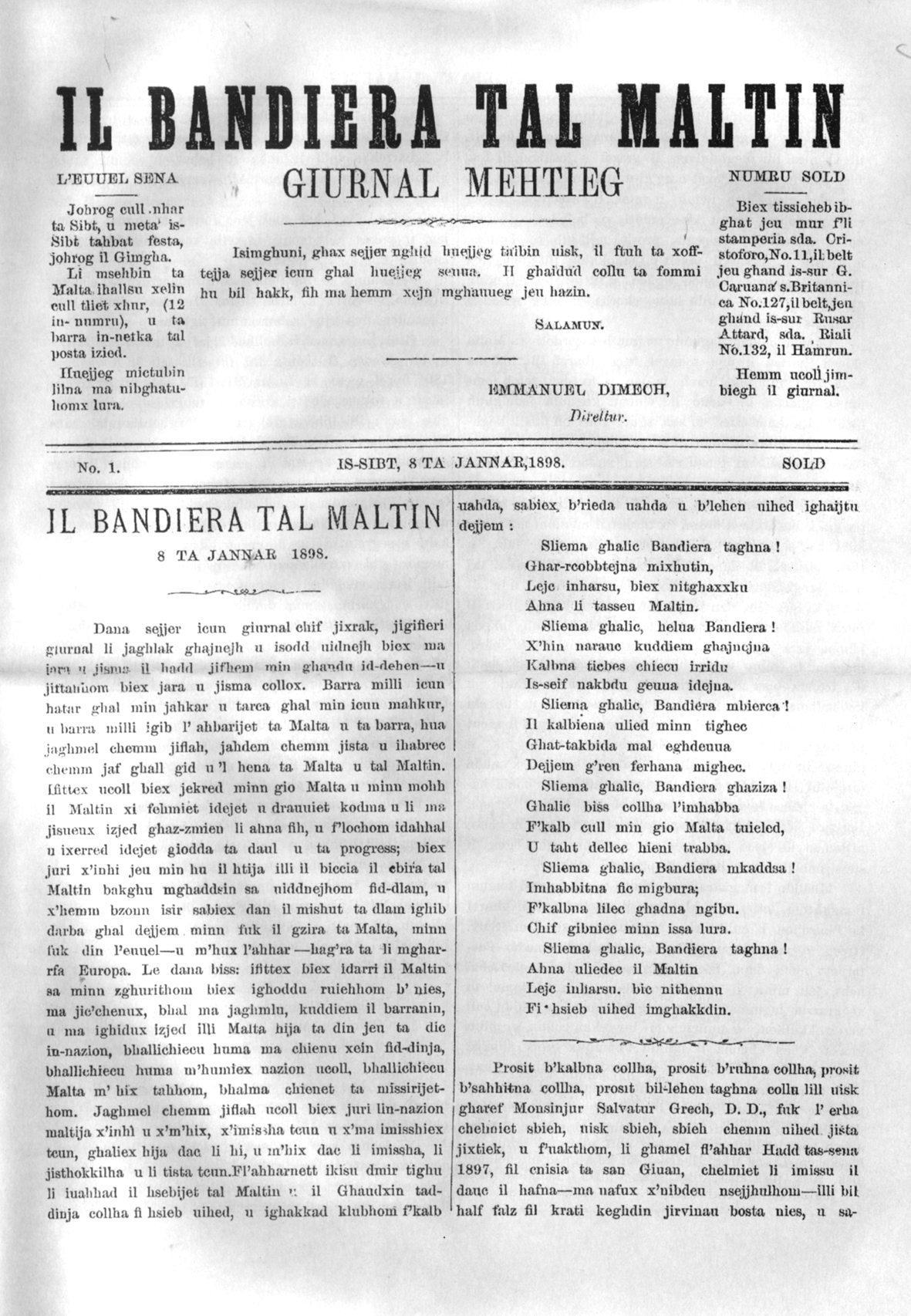
First issue of Dimech's weekly Il-Bandiera tal-Maltin (The Flag of the Maltese) - 8 January 1898

== Life as a public figure ==
Once out of prison in 1897, Dimech embarked on an outstanding public career that brought him fame, though not immediate success. From the start of 1898 he issued a weekly in Maltese that was to serve him as his mouthpiece for many years to come. He called it Il-Bandiera tal-Maltin. Through it he explored, albeit with the language and prose of the times, the Maltese social structure. Furthermore, Dimech proposed the way forward. He advocated the education of the masses, and audaciously specified how Malta could one day be an economically self-sufficient independent republic.

=== Publications ===
During his lifetime Dimech issued various publications. The 462 editions of Il-Bandiera tal-Maltin are perhaps the foremost. But others are also interesting. Amongst these one can find other newspapers in foreign languages (of short duration), two novels, grammar books (in Italian, English, French, and Maltese), and pamphlets. Unfortunately, books of poetry have not survived. Dimech's main objective with these publications was to form a political class from amongst the people, especially young men and women who had not the possibility of acquiring an education otherwise. Dimech was enamored of the Maltese language, and saw it as an efficacious tool of emancipation.

=== Foreign experience ===
Dimech had travelled to Tunis in 1890 for expediency reasons. However, in 1903 he visited Montenegro (for almost three weeks) to study at close range the social and political situation there. He enhanced this experience by travelling twice to the north of Italy (especially Genoa, Milan and Turin), where, in all, he spent almost four years. There Dimech became particularly acquainted to workers' movements and the trade unions. He was also very interested in the state-church relationship that prevailed in Italy during that fascinating time. Understandably, he came back to Malta fired up and all ready to bring about the social changes he had been mulling over for many years.

=== Main political programme ===
It is indisputable that Dimech wanted, and worked for, an overhaul of the social system. His main aim was to reform social inequalities whether they were maintained by the colonial government, the Catholic Church, the privileged class, the landed gentry, or whoever. His strategy was to begin with the political education of a new grass-root group of people, and subsequently permeate the illiterate, underprivileged and destitute masses. His ultimate aims were to make Malta an industrialised country that could be economically self-reliant and, eventually, be worthy of self-rule.

=== Popular organiser ===
Definitely back to Malta from Italy in 1911, Dimech founded what he called Ix-Xirka ta' l-Imdawlin (The League of the Enlightened; pronounced ishirka taal imdaaulin). This was a sort of union in the modern understanding of the word, in the sense that it was a social club, an organisation militating for workers' rights, a school of adult education, and a political party all in one. Through this league Dimech hoped to have a say, and transformative influence, in the political, and then the social, and maybe also the religious, fields. Young idealists and people craving for change flocked to him, and not only from the lower class but also from the middle and higher classes. Dimech's political "revolution" had begun.

=== Excommunicated ===
But immediately Dimech was held in his tracks. The then mighty Catholic Church pounced on him, and first condemned Il-Bandiera tal-Maltin and Ix-Xirka ta' l-Imdawlin, and shortly afterward excommunicated Dimech himself. Though this was an overwhelmingly devastating blow in all respects in Malta of the 1910s, Dimech was undaunted. He fought back with the little freedom of movement and action that was left to him, and stalwartly stood his ground. For a whole year, between 1911 and 1912, he and his family were systematically and pitilessly persecuted by the Church, but nothing could break his back. Then, obliquely admitting defeat, the Church called a truce and retired Dimech's excommunication on December 1, 1912.

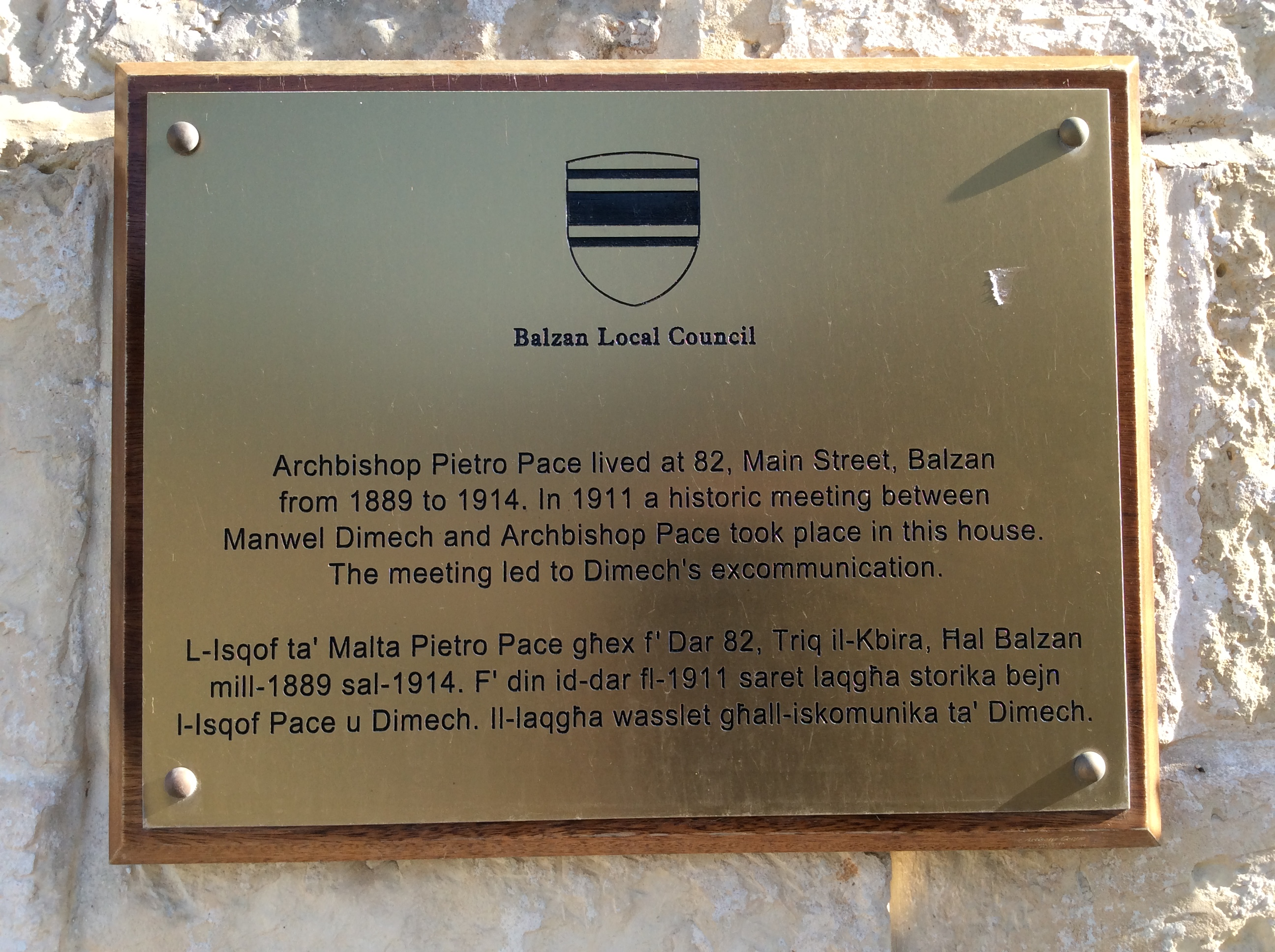
A plaque at Balzan, Malta, recalling a meeting Dimech had with the bishop during his excommunication

Dimech had won against all odds, and immediately re-established his former organization with the name Ix-Xirka tal-Maltin (The League of the Maltese; pronounced ishirka tal maltin).

=== Considered dangerous ===
But the Catholic Church was not the only institution disgruntled with Dimech. The colonial authorities were unhappy with his widespread and growing influence amongst the workers at the Maltese shipyards. Indeed, the great majority of Dimech's supporters came from there, and this threatened to precariously disrupt the use of Malta as one of His Majesty's major Mediterranean naval base.

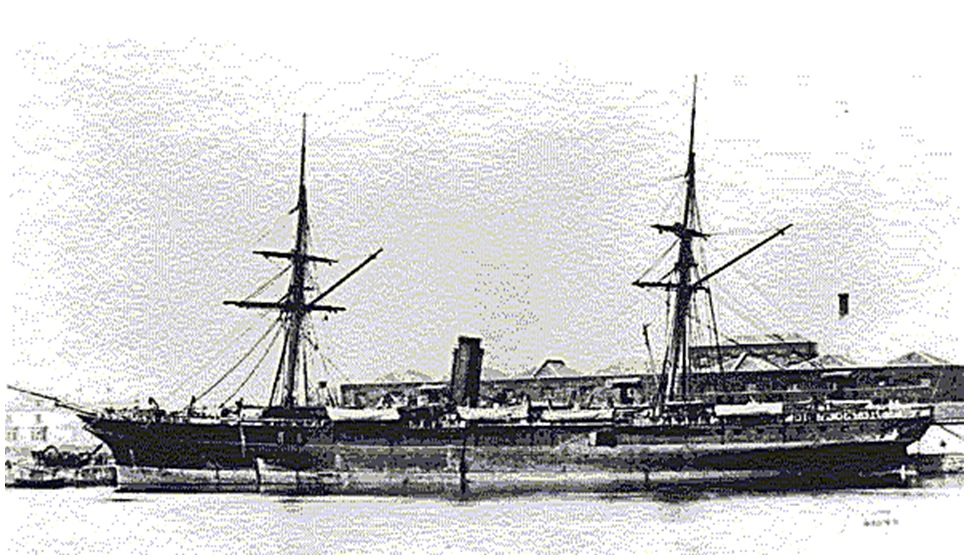
Italian S.S. Stura on which Dimech was exiled

=== Deportation and imprisonment ===
Just over a year after Dimech re-launched his Xirka tal-Maltin, he was arrested. The First World War had just begun, and Malta's colonial governor accepted the accusation that Dimech was a spy of Germany (then at war with Great Britain), and surreptitiously deported him to the island to Sicily, in Italy (as yet a neutral country in the war). There he was shortly arrested again, and asked to leave to a country, save Malta, of his own choice. Dimech chose Egypt, then a British protectorate. Again, shortly afterwards, he was arrested once more, this time for good. For the remaining days of his life, for seven long and miserable years, Dimech lived in prisons or concentration camps either at Alexandria or Cairo.

=== Exile ===
At some unspecified time the British began to consider Dimech as a "prisoner of war". However, when the First World War came to an end in 1918, he was not released. Technically and actually, Dimech then became an exile, and he remained so until the end of his days. Various pleas for his return to Malta were refused by the colonial government in Malta, even when these were repeatedly made by the Commander-in-Chief of the Egyptian Expeditionary Force, Edmund Allenby, and later by the Secretary of State for the Colonies, Winston Churchill.

== Death ==
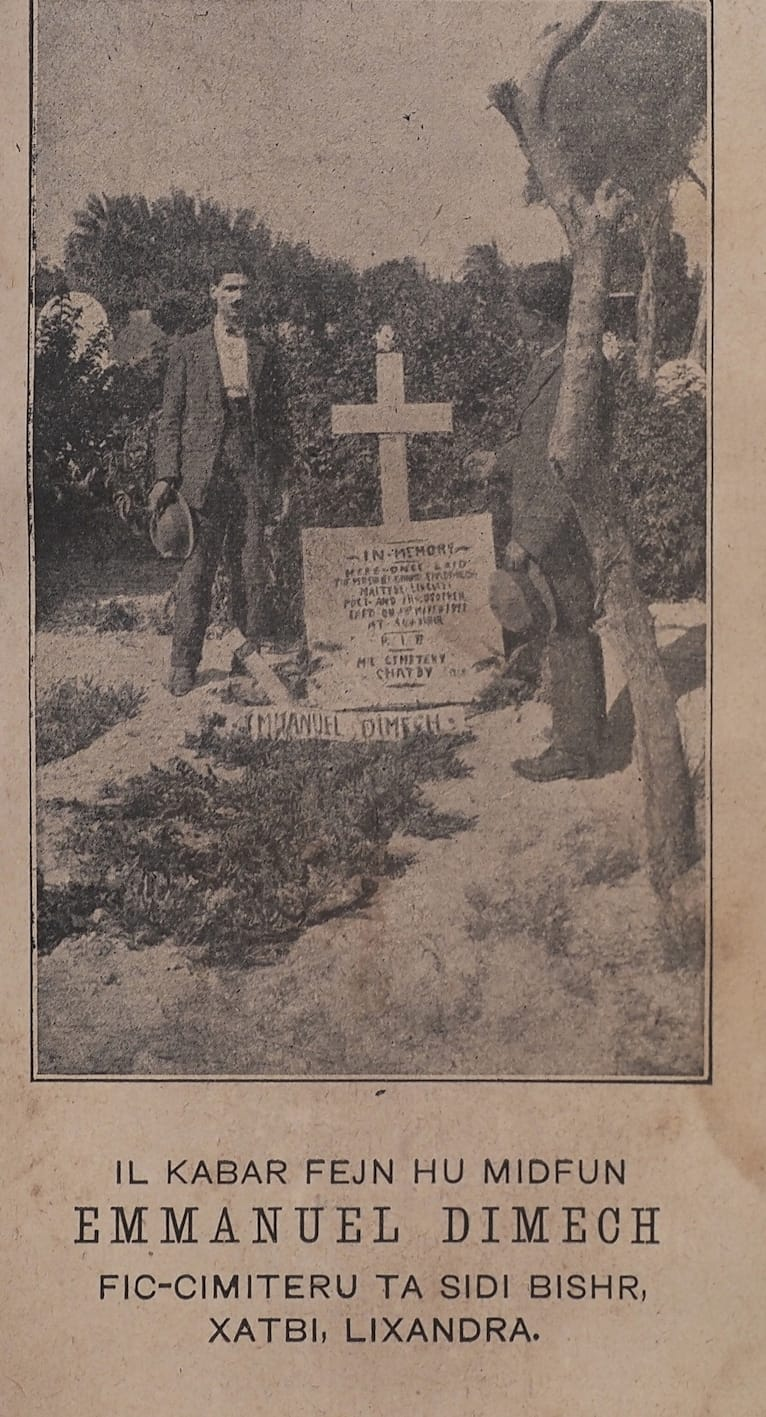
Sepolture of Manwel Dimech at Sidi Bishr

At the end of 1918 Dimech was transferred to a prisoner-of-war camp at Sidi Bishr in Alexandria, Egypt. Dire prison conditions caused his health to deteriorate fast. In November 1920, after becoming half-paralyzed by apoplexy, he was transferred to Victoria College, Alexandria, at Sidi Bishr itself, a college that had been transformed into a hospital due to war exigencies. He died in Alexandria on April 17, 1921, and was unceremoniously buried in the sand grounds of Victoria College, Alexandria, itself. All attempts to locate his grave have been futile.

== The Dimechians ==
A small group of young followers of Dimech continued to be somewhat active in Malta well after his deportation in 1914. They organized Malta's first recorded strike at the Royal shipyards in 1920, and certain of them played a significant part in the Sette Giugno riots, which led to the granting of Malta's first self-government constitution in 1921.

== Posthumous recognition ==
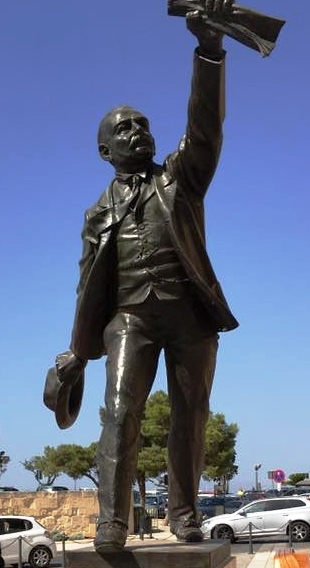
Monument to Manwel Dimech at Castille Square, Valletta

Dimech was re-introduced to the public by Gerald Azzopardi (1910–1993) in the 1960s, and later, in the 1970s, he was given more academic validity by Henry Frendo, leading to an overall renewed interest in Dimech's life.

Following the coming to power of the Malta Labour Party in 1971, the socialist Prime Minister Dom Mintoff, reframed discourse surrounding Dimech, aiming to present him as the philosophical father of Maltese socialism, verging on the creation of a cult of personality. This framing built upon existing discourse ongoing within the Communist Party of Malta, which had adopted Dimech as their equivalent of Lenin.

A small run of one Maltese pound coins were produced engraved with his name and likeness in 1972. A monument to him was erected in 1976 in front of the Prime Minister's office in Valletta, at one of Malta's main squares. A plaque was installed on the facade of the Labour Party club in the town of Żabbar depicting the four heads of Maltese socialism: Vassalli, Dimech, Mintoff and Mifsud Bonnici in a similar style to the five heads of Marxism commonly portrayed in China.

In 2004 Dr Mark Montebello placed the study and appreciation of Dimech on a new and unprecedented standing with a master biographical work called simply Dimech (PEG, Malta), which started to behold Dimech's personality in a more balanced and objective way.

On October 14, 2012, the discovery of new Dimech manuscripts was announced dating from the last three years of his exile. The manuscripts contain an extensive work in English made up of thousands of aphorisms, and some fables, epitaphs and poems. The discovery was made in two phases, in 2002 and 2009. Dimech's work was published in 2012 by Sensiela Kotba Socjalisti, SKS, as Aphorisms: Wisdom of a philosopher in exile.

In April 2013, Karl Fiorini composed a work called 'Sinfonietta Pro Populo' based on the 'Innu Malti' (the Maltese Hymn) written by Dimech. He created a refined symphony which placed revolutionary aspirations within the modern parameters of music. The Malta Philharmonic Orchestra, notwithstanding all the problems with which it was faced, emerged triumphant under the musical directorship of Brian Schembri.

A year later, in June 2014, Henry Frendo published yet other hitherto unknown manuscripts belonging to Dimech dating from the early 1880s (when Dimech was still in prison). The publication, Dimech's Lost Prison Poems (Midsea Books), contains poems by Dimech (some of which signed and dated in his own hand), and letters received by Dimech while in prison.

=== National recognition ===
As a sign of national recognition, on November 10, 2012, the President of Malta, George Abela, unveiled in St John Street, Valletta, a commemorative plaque marking the birthplace of Dimech. A year later, on October 13, 2013, the Prime Minister of Malta, Joseph Muscat, unveiled in Qormi another commemorative plaque marking the spot were, in 1912, Dimech had been stoned by a mob. On September 5, 2014, exactly 100 years to the day since the beginning of Dimech's exile, the President of Malta, Marie Louise Coleiro Preca, unveiled, close to the Customs house at Valletta (from where Dimech was sent to his exile), yet another commemorative plaque marking the event.

In 2021, a musical about his life was written and subsequently staged at Kordin prison where Dimech spent a large part of his formative years. Veteran actor Joseph Zammit starred in the titular role. The musical, titled 'Il-Qfil u l-Helsien ta' Manwel Dimech" (The Imprisonment and Liberation of Manwel Dimech) was organised by Teatru Malta, now a public entity under the cap of the National Agency for Performing Arts (NAPA), and received positive critical reviews. The musical followed the life of Manwel Dimech, most notably his years as a political activist and his subsequent captivity and imprisonment.

== Foundation ==
In April 2019, it was announced that a foundation will be established bearing Dimech's name. Though it was stated that the foundation will be "dedicated to the ideals of Dimech," further details of the construction have not been revealed.

== Bibliography ==
- 1897 L-Għalliem tiegħu f'Ilsien Italjan (Teach Yourself Italian)
- 1898 Il-Bandiera tal-Maltin (The Flag of the Maltese; every week till 1914; with interruptions)
- 1898 La Guerra (The Struggle)
- 1898 Majsi Cutajar
- 1902 Il Chelliem Inglis (The English Speaker)
- 1904 Un Nuovo Dio (A New God; nom de plume: Eusebio degli Allori)
- 1905 Ivan u Prascovia (Ivan and Prascovia)
- 1907 Il Chelliem tal Erbat Ilsna (The Speaker of Four Languages)
- 1911 I Suicidi (The Suiciders)
- 1914 Is Sisien tax Xirka Maltïa (Principles of the Maltese Society)
- 1917–20 Aphorisms

=== Posthumous ===
- 1926 Il Chelliem Inglis (The English Speaker), 2nd revised ed. by Giovanni Magro, Giuseppe Arpa and Giovanni Segond, Tipografia Tancredi Borg, Malta, 1068 pp.
- 1972 Ivan u Prascovia (Ivan and Prascovia), 2nd ed. by Ġeraldu Azzopardi, Malta, 231 pp.
- 1978 Għejdut Manwel Dimech (Manuel Dimech's Words), selected ed. of articles by Ġeraldu Azzopardi, Union Press Malta, 239 pp.
- 2011 Ivan u Praskovja u Kitbiet Oħra (Ivan and Prascovia and Other Writings), 3rd ed. and selected writings by Mark Montebello, SKS Publications, Malta, 410 pp.
- 2012 Aphorisms: Wisdon of a philosopher in exile, 1st published ed. by Mark Montebello and Francis Galea, SKS Publications, Malta,
- 2014 Dimech's Lost Prison Poems, Henry Frendo, Midsea, Malta, 128 pp.
- 2014 Dimech Poeta (Dimech the Poet), Jessica Micallef, SKS Publications, Malta, 321 pp.

=== Significant publications related to Dimech ===
- 1926 Għakda Proletaria Maltija, L'Idea Socialista (The Socialist Idea), John Bull Press, Malta.
- 1930 Juan Mamo, Ulied in Nanna Venut fl'Amerka (Grandmother Venut's Family in America), Tipografia Antonio Ellul, Malta, 400 pp.
- 1960 Robert Mifsud Bonnici, 'Dimech, Manwel', Dizzjunarju Bijo-Bibljografiku Nazzjonali (National Bio-Bibliographical Dictionary), Department of Information, Malta Government, Malta, p. 179.
- 1971 Henry Frendo, 'Il-ħajja ta' Manwel Dimech' (The Life of Manuel Dimech), Il-Ħajja, Malta, 11 till 16 January, p. 6.
- 1971 Henry Frendo, Lejn Tnissil ta' Nazzjon (Towards the Birth of a Nation), Klabb Kotba Maltin, Malta, 103 pp.
- 1972 Henry Frendo, Henry, Birth Pangs of a Nation, Mediterranean Publications, Malta, 188 pp.
- 1972 Henry Frendo, Story of a Book, Malta, 8 pp.
- 1975 Ġeraldu Azzopardi, X'Ġarrab Manwel Dimech (What Manuel Dimech Went Through), Malta, 152 pp.
- 1977 Herbert Ganado, Rajt Malta Tinbidel (I Saw Malta Change), Interprint, Malta, vol. I, pp. 211–217; vol. II, p. 357; vol. III, p. 335.
- 1979 Henry Frendo, Party Politics in a Fortress Colony, Malta, especially pp. 148–151.
- 1981 Ġeraldu Azzopardi, Manwel Dimech u Dun Ġorġ Preca (Manuel Dimech and Rev George Preca), Malta, 19 pp.
- 1984 Adrianus Koster, Prelates and Politicians in Malta, Van Gorcum, Assen, Olanda, partikularment pp. 69–72; 241–242.
- 1991 Emmanuel Agius, Social Consciousness of the Church in Malta: 1891–1921, Media Centre, Malta, especially pp. 80–86.
- 1991 John Chircop, The Left within the Maltese Labour Movement, Mireva, Malta, partikularment pp. 59–69.
- 1995 Mark Montebello, Mark, 'Manwel Dimech', Stedina għall-Filosofija Maltija (An Invitation to Maltese Philosophy), Pubblikazzjoni PEG, Malta, pp. 118–121.
- 1997 Paul A. Buhagiar, Ix-Xogħlijiet Miġbura ta' Manwel Dimech (The Collected Works of Manuel Dimech), unpublished dissertation, University of Malta, Malta, 619 pp.
- 1997 Desmond Zammit Marmarà, 'Manuel Dimech's Search for Enlightenment', Beyond Schooling, ed. by P. Mayo u G. Baldacchino, Mireva, Malta, pp. 5–22.
- 2001 Mark Montebello, 'Dimech, Manwel', Il-Ktieb tal-Filosofija f'Malta (The Sourcebook of Philosophy in Malta), vol. I, PIN Publications, Malta, pp. 119–121.
- 2001 Henry Frendo, Henry, 'Maltese exile in Egypt', four parts, The Sunday Times, Malta, 22 and 29 April; 6 and 13 May, pp. 36–37, 40–43, 40–41 and 46–47 respectively.
- 2004 Mark Montebello, Dimech, PEG Publications, Malta, 582 pp.
- 2006 Mark Montebello, Jien, Manwel Dimech (I, Manuel Dimech), Daritama, Malta, 95 pp.
- 2006 Maria and Michael Zammit, 'Manwel Dimech: Bniedem ta' Spiritwalità' (Manuel Dimech: A Man of Spirituality), Knisja tat-Triq, Malta, pp. 29–38.
- 2007 Francis Galea, Juan Mamo, SKS Publications, Malta, especially pp. 74–100.
- 2008 Yosanne Vella, ed., From the Coming of the Knights to EU Membership, Maltese History Sec Level, History Teachers' Association, Malta, p. 74.
- 2008 Montebello, Mark, 'Manuel Dimech', 20th Century Philosophy in Malta, Pubblikazzjoni Agius & Agius, Malta, pp. 47–56.
- 2010 Mark Montebello, Manwel Dimech: Fi Kliemi (Manuel Dimech: In my own words), Kottoner 98FM, Malta.
- 2011 Mark Montebello, 'Newly discovered writings of Manuel Dimech' and 'More writings by Manuel Dimech come to light', two parts, The Sunday Times, Malta, 10 April, pp. 48–49, and 17 April, pp. 52–53.
- 2011 Giovanni Bonello, 'More memories of Manwel Dimech', The Sunday Times, Malta, April 24, p. 18.
- 2011 Michael Grech, 'X'ħasibna? Għarab slavaġ tal-Mokololo?' (Who do he thinks we are? Savage Arabs from Mocololo?), Ta' Barra Minn Hawn, ed. by M. Galea, Klabb Kotba Maltin, Malta, pp. 46–85.
- 2011 Carmel Mallia, Mi, Manwel Dimech (I, Manuel Dimech), short biography in Esperanto, Malta, pp. 42.
- 2011 Mark Montebello, 'Manuel Dimech', Malta's Philosophy & Philosophers, PIN Publications, Malta, pp. 90–93.
- 2011 Adrian Grima, Minn kull Xorta ta' Qżież (All sorts of Filth), Karmen Mikallef Buhagar Foundation, University of Malta, Malta, pp. 22–27.
- 2012 Frendo Henry, Europe and Empire, Midsea Books, Malta, especially Chapter 5 (pp. 95–151).
- 2013 Various authors, Manwel Dimech: Ilbieraħ – Illum – Għada (Manuel Dimech: Yesterday – Today – Tomorrow), ed. by Mark Montebello, SKS Publications, Malta. 200 pp.
- 2014 Mark Montebello, The Amazing Story of Manuel Dimech, Dom Communications, Malta.

== Places named after Dimech ==
- Manwel Dimech Street, in Għaxaq; Qormi; Rabat, Gozo; San Ġiljan; Sliema
- Manwel Dimech Bridge, in San Ġiljan

== See also ==
- Philosophy in Malta
