= 2014 Maltese presidential election =

← 2009	1 April 2014	2019 →
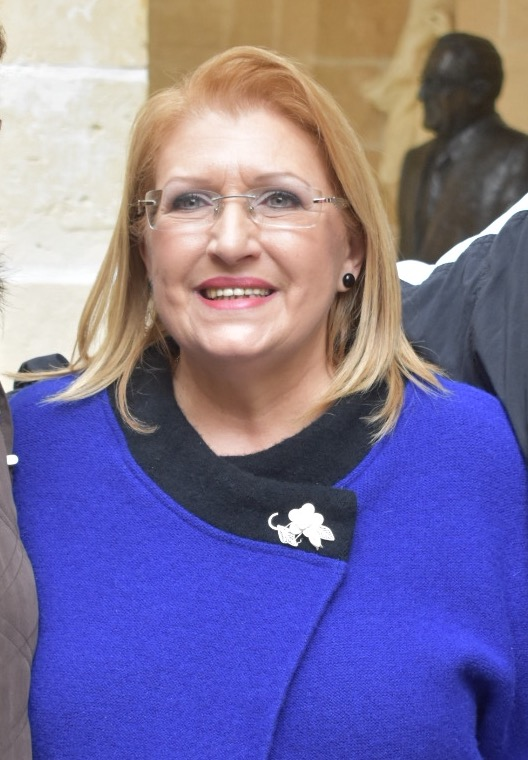
Nominee	Marie-Louise Coleiro Preca
Party	Labour
Electoral vote	Uncontested
President before election
George Abela
Labour
Elected President
Marie-Louise Coleiro Preca
Labour

An indirect presidential election was held in Malta on 1 April 2014. Labour Party MP and Minister of the Family and Social Solidarity Marie-Louise Coleiro Preca was unanimously elected to become the next President of Malta on 4 April 2014.
