= Jubilee House =

Official residence and office to the President of Ghana

Coordinates: 5°34′47.1″N 00°11′18.5″W

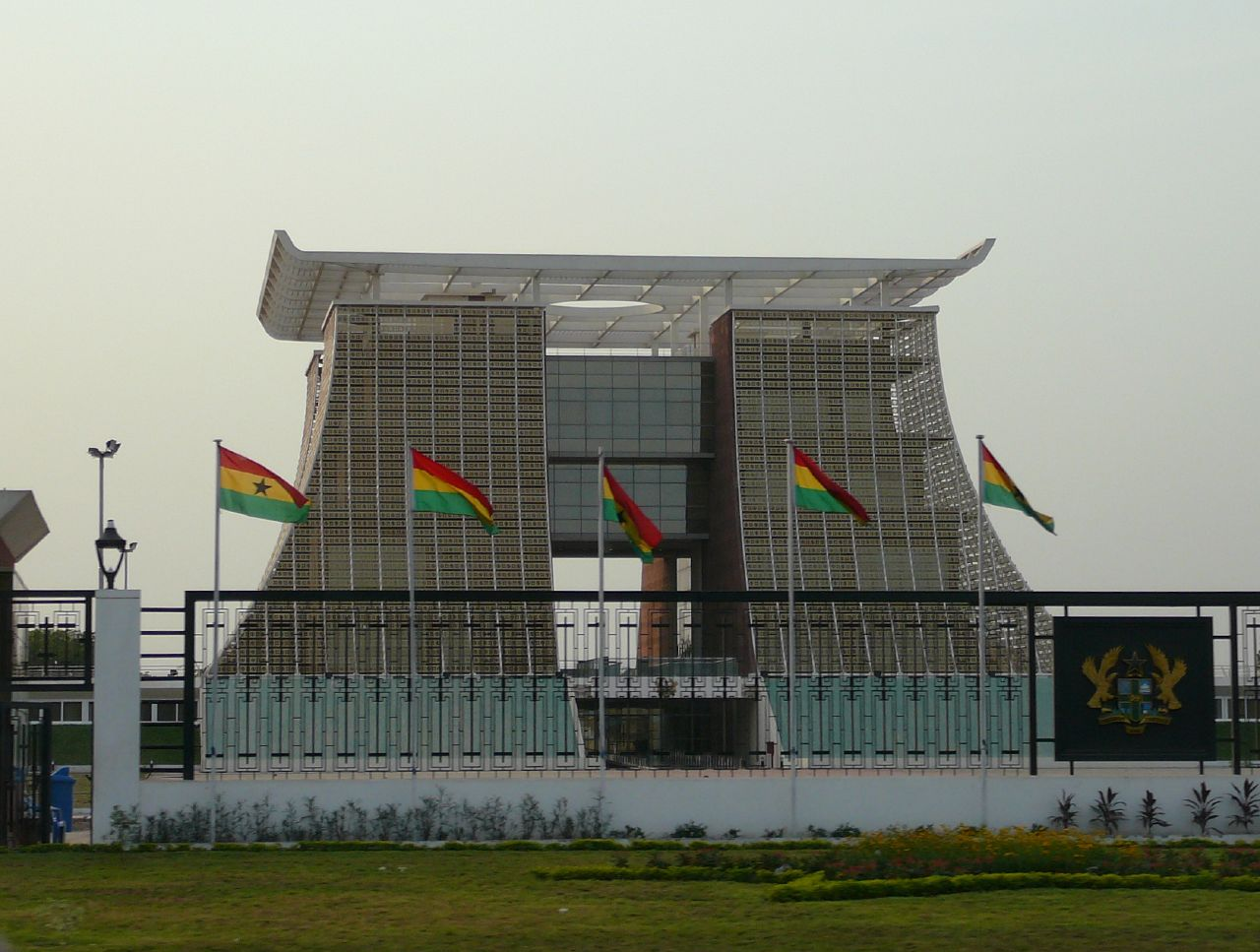
- Jubilee House and Presidential Palace
- Interactive map of the Jubilee House area
- Former names: Flagstaff House
- Alternative names: Golden Jubilee House

General information
- Location: Accra, Ghana
- Inaugurated: November 2008
- Cost: $ 35–50 million
- Owner: Government of Ghana

Jubilee House, previously known as Flagstaff House, is the presidential palace in Accra that serves as a residence and office to the President of Ghana. Jubilee House is built on the site of a building that was constructed and used for administrative purposes by the British Gold Coast Government. The previous seat of government of Ghana was Osu Castle. It was named Golden Jubilee House by President John Agyekum Kufour in November 2008 to coincide with the 50th year of Ghana's independence. The name has since reverted to Jubilee House.

== History ==
Flagstaff House, as it was previously known, was reconstructed and inaugurated by the government of John Agyekum Kufour with the name Golden Jubilee House in November 2008, when construction was about 70%–80% completed. In January 2009, the incoming government of President John Atta Mills moved the office of the president back to Osu Castle and later changed the sign in front of the building back to its original name, claiming that the previous government had not used a Legislative Instrument to effect the change as required by law. The Mills government was in turn critical of the fact that the name Flagstaff House, having been given to the building by the British Gold Coast government, glorifies Ghana's Gold Coast past. The seat of government was moved back to Flagstaff House in January 2013 by John Dramani Mahama.

== Construction cost ==
The original budget for the reconstruction of $30m was a grant from the Indian government. However, BBC journalist David Amanor reported that the construction might have cost as much as $45–50m. Building of the palace was overseen by an Indian contractor who used Ghanaian sub-contractors.

== Notable events ==
- On 24 February 1966, soldiers stormed Flagstaff House as part of a military coup supported by the CIA, ousting Ghana's First President Kwame Nkrumah.
- In 2002, thousands of Liberian women led by Leymah Gbowee staged a silent protest outside the previous presidential palace in Accra and demanded a resolution to the country's civil war. Their actions brought about an agreement that achieved peace in Liberia after a 14-year civil war. The story is told in a 2008 documentary film titled Pray the Devil Back to Hell.
- On 4 January 2017, President John Dramani Mahama took then President-elect Nana Akufo-Addo on a tour of Jubilee house.
- On 26 July 2017, Mrs. Marie-Louise Coleiro Preca, president of Malta and her spouse, Edgar Preca visited Jubilee House.
- On 6 April 2018, Mr. George M. Weah, President of Liberia, visited Jubilee house.
- On 22 October 2018, Brigadier (Rtd.) Julius Madaa Bio, president of Sierra Leone visited Jubilee House.
- On 2 November 2018, Prince Charles and his wife, Camilla visited Jubilee House.

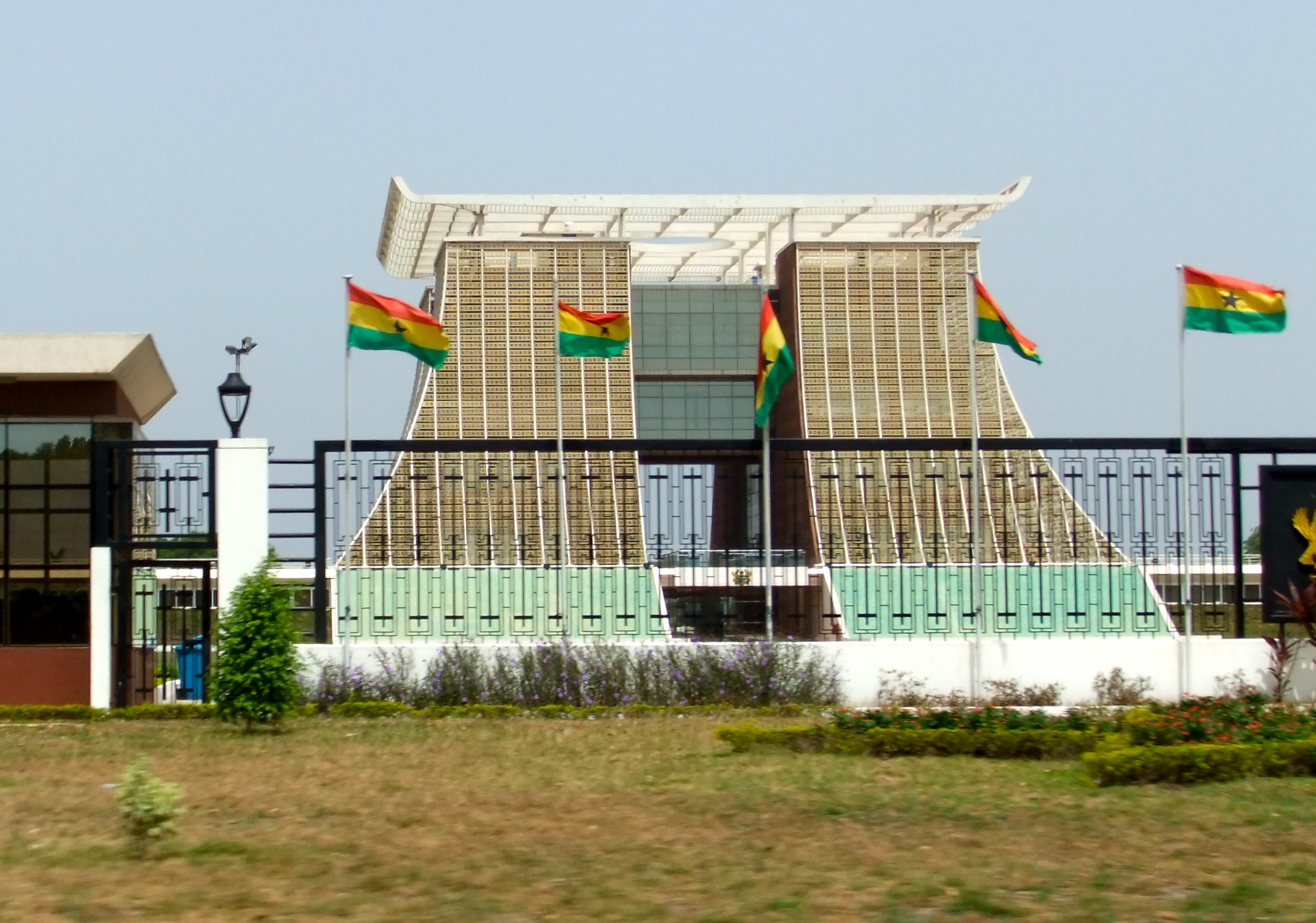
Golden Jubilee House (Flagstaff House)

== Re-construction ==
The re-construction of the presidential palace and building by the government of John Agyekum Kufour, who belonged to the ruling New Patriotic Party (NPP), was criticized by the opposition party, the National Democratic Congress (NDC), during the 2008 elections. The NDC government when sworn into office on 7 January 2009 refused to utilize Flagstaff House, preferring Osu Castle as the seat of government. The house was temporarily used as offices for the Ministry of Foreign Affairs.
