= 2009 Maltese presidential election =

| ← 2004 | 12 January 2009 | 2014 → |
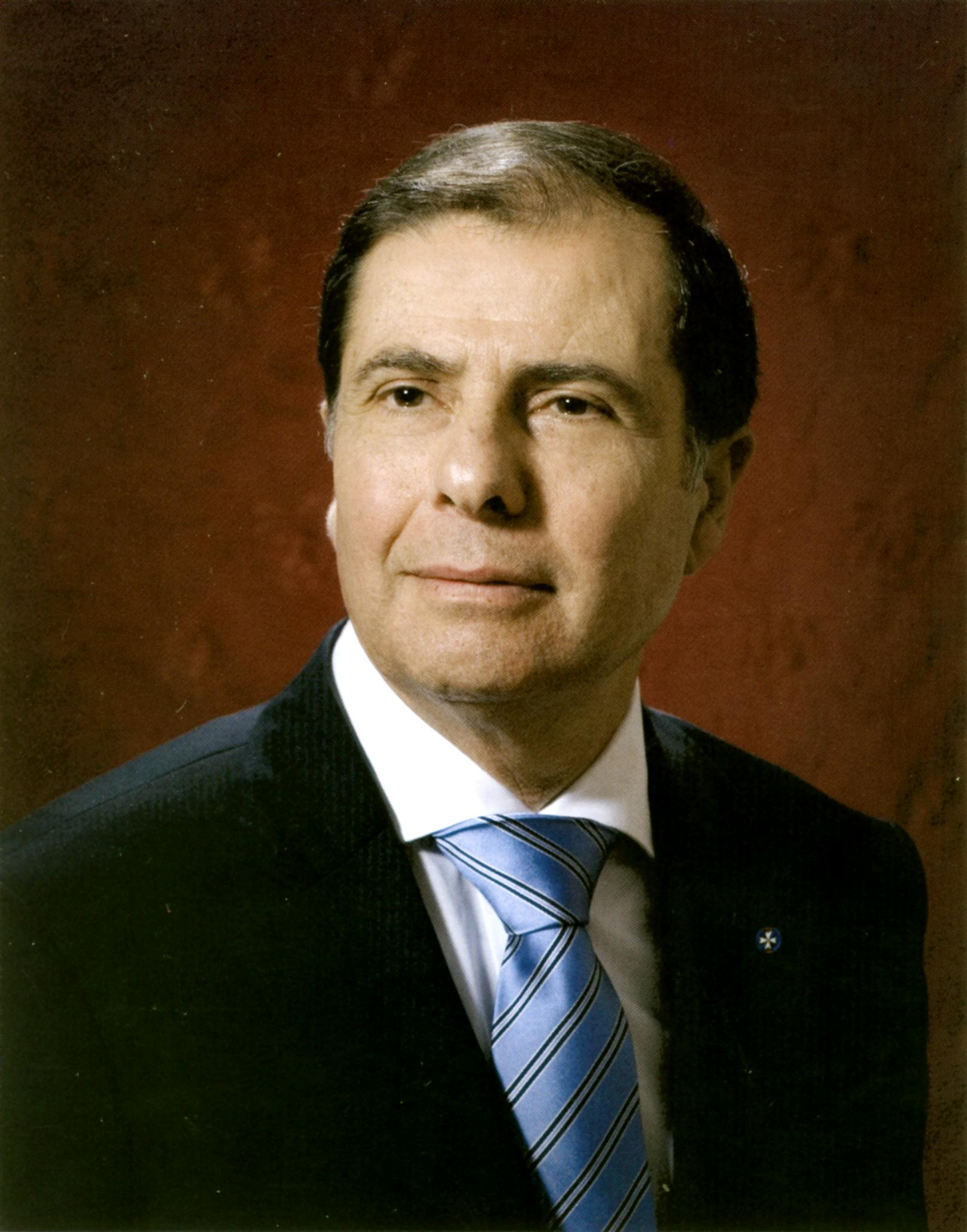
| Nominee | George Abela |
| Party | Labour |
| Electoral vote | Uncontested |
President before election
Eddie Fenech Adami
Nationalist
Elected President
George Abela
Labour

An indirect presidential election was held in Malta on 12 January 2009. Former Labour Party deputy leader George Abela was elected to become the next President of Malta on 4 April 2009, when the incumbent Eddie Fenech Adami steps down; this marks the first time that a member of the opposition was elected president, as the Nationalist Party controlled the legislature.
