= Mary Fenech Adami =

Mary Sciberras Fenech Adami
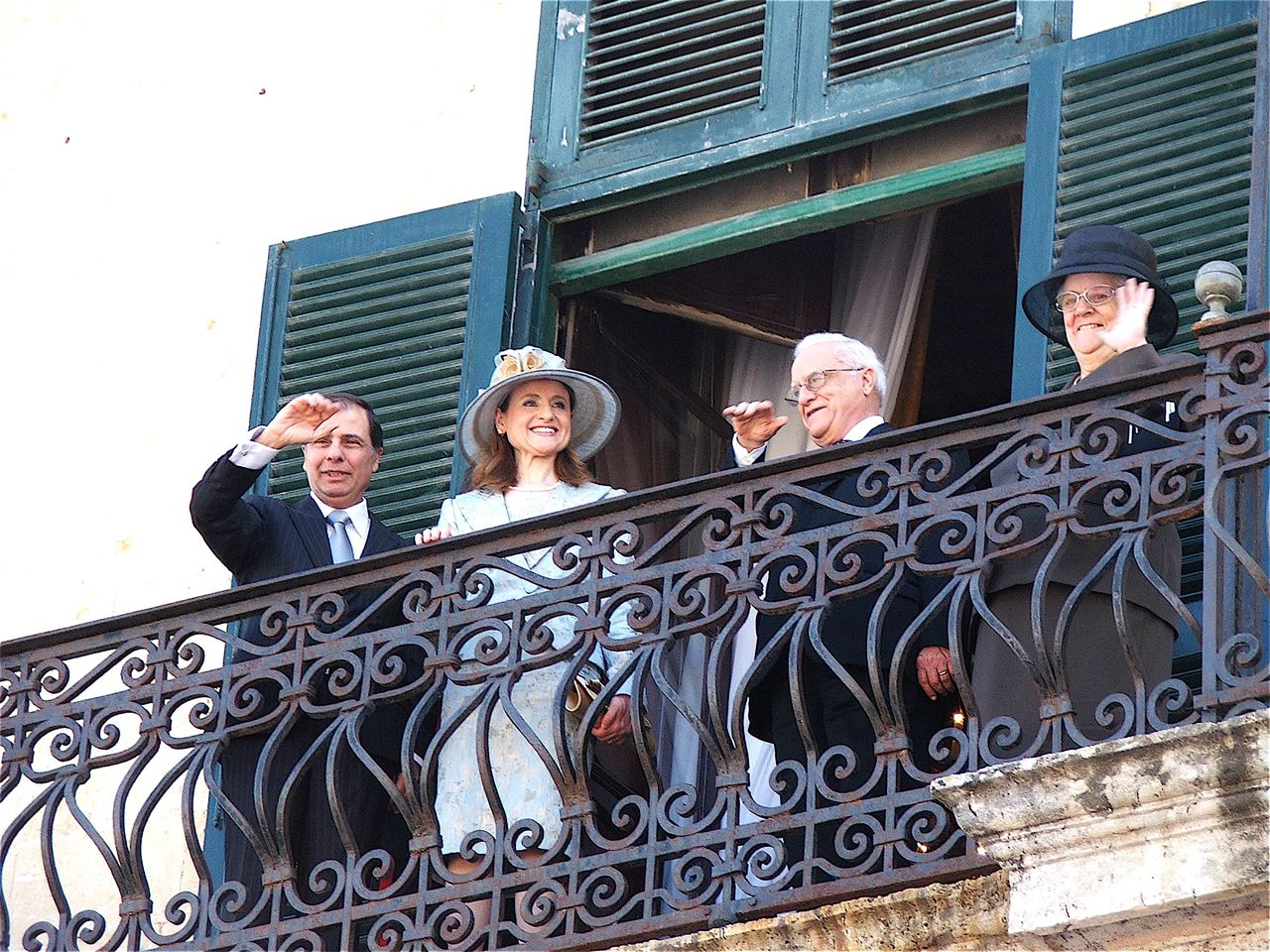
- Mary Fenech Adami, right, saluting the crowd in St. George's Square on the day of George Abela's inauguration

First Lady of Malta
- In role 4 April 2004 – 4 April 2009
- President: Eddie Fenech Adami
- Preceded by: Violet de Marco
- Succeeded by: Margaret Abela

Personal details
- Born: 13 October 1933 Sliema, Malta
- Died: 8 July 2011 (aged 77) Msida, Malta
- Spouse: Eddie Fenech Adami (m. 1965)
- Children: 5

Mary Sciberras Fenech Adami (Maltese: Marija Sciberras Fenech Adami; 13 October 1933 – 8 July 2011) was the wife of the seventh president of Malta, Edward Fenech Adami. She was First Lady of Malta from 2004 to 2009.

== Biography ==
=== Early and personal life ===
Mary Sciberras was born in Sliema on 13 October 1933, and attended Sliema State Secondary School. She married Edward Fenech Adami on 27 June 1965. The couple had five children. Fenech Adami was a private woman, but was "regarded as her husband’s pillar of strength throughout his lengthy political career". She was a devout Catholic, and reportedly never missed daily Mass.

=== 1979 attack ===
In 1977, Eddie Fenech Adami became leader of the country's Nationalist Party. On 15 October 1979, a large group of thugs ransacked various Nationalist Party clubs and the private residence of Mary and Edward Fenech Adami in Birkirkara, after attacking the premises of the newspaper, The Times of Malta. Mary, who was returning from mass, found her home's front door wide open, and ten men inside ransacking the residence. She was beaten by the men, who were carrying "chains and bars".

The 1979 attack, later called "Black Monday", consolidated Eddie Fenech Adami's leadership as in the Nationalist Party.

=== As First Lady ===
When Edward Fenech Adami became President, Mary chose not to move into San Anton Palace, instead remaining in her home in Birkirkara. She continued to walk to the local market to buy her own groceries. As First Lady, Fenech Adami did take part in charitable events, such as visiting schools to raise funds for the annual Bank of Valletta's L-Istrina campaign.

She was a chair of the Malta Community Chest Fund.

=== Later life and death ===
In 2008, Fenech Adami was given the Grand-Cross of the Order of Prince Henry, Portugal .

Fenech Adami was diagnosed with cancer in 2010, and began undergoing treatment.

In early July 2011, she suffered a heart attack at the wedding of then-Prime Minister Lawrence Gonzi’s son. She was hospitalized, dying on 8 July at age 77. Her funeral was held on 10 July in Birkirkara, and "resembled a state funeral".

== Awards and honours ==
- Grand-Cross of the Order of Prince Henry, Portugal (11.12.2008)

Honorary titles
Preceded by Violet de Marco	First Lady of Malta; 2004–2009	Succeeded by Margaret Abela
