= Margaret Abela =

8th First Lady of Malta

First Lady of Malta
- In role 4 April 2009 – 4 April 2014
- President: George Abela
- Preceded by: Mary Fenech Adami
- Succeeded by: Edgar Preca (As First Gentleman)

Personal details
- Born: Margaret Cauchi; March 14, 1950 (age 76) Valletta, Crown Colony of Malta
- Spouse: George Abela (1976–present)
- Children: 2

Margaret Abela (born 14 March 1950) is the wife of the eighth president of Malta, George Abela and hence served as First Lady of Malta during his tenure.

== Education ==
She started her elementary education with the Franciscan nuns at the Pilar School in Valletta, she completed her primary education at St. Elmo Primary School and her secondary education at Maria Assunta Secondary and Technical School in Ħamrun.

== Early life ==
On completing her studies, she worked on a full-time basis in the administration department of the Old University of Malta in Valletta and later on at Tal-Qroqq, Msida.

After she got married, she carried out administrative work at the Abela Advocates law firm run by her husband and subsequently also by her son, Robert Abela.

== Personal life ==
She married George Abela on 24 May 1976 and had two children, Robert (born 7 December 1977) and Maria (born 1983). Robert Abela was sworn in as the 14th Prime Minister of Malta on 13 January 2020.

In July 2025, Abela and her husband were involved in a car crash in Fgura which left a woman dead and another in critical condition. The Abelas were discharged from hospital around a week later.

== Interests and social contributions ==
For years, she was socially involved in the Tarxien parish community, where she used to give catechism lessons (Sunday School) to children preparing for their First Holy Communion.

== Honours ==
=== Foreign honours ===
- Estonia: Recipient First Class of the Order of the Cross of Terra Mariana (31.05.2012, serie 989 - n° 98)

== See also ==
- President of Malta

Honorary titles
Preceded by Mary Fenech Adami	First Lady of Malta; 2009–2014	Succeeded by Edgar Preca
