= Edgar Preca =

First Gentleman of Malta

First Gentleman of Malta
- In role 4 April 2014 – 4 April 2019
- President: Marie-Louise Coleiro Preca
- Preceded by: Margaret Abela (As First Lady)
- Succeeded by: Miriam Vella (As First Lady)

Personal details
- Born: Valletta
- Spouse: Marie-Louise Coleiro Preca (m. 2007)

Edgar Preca is the husband of former president of Malta, Marie-Louise Coleiro Preca, and was First Gentleman of Malta from 2014 to 2019. He was the first person in Malta to hold the male title.

== Early life and career ==
Preca worked at Air Malta for 34 years until he retired from work in 2012 to help his wife in her campaign for president.

== Personal life ==
Preca met Marie-Louise in 2002 after they were introduced by a mutual friend at the General Workers' Union cafeteria in Valletta. Despite receiving her phone number, Preca later said he was too shy to call her and they would not speak again until four years later, 2006, when they bumped into each other at the same cafeteria. They began dating and married 18 months later.

== As First Gentleman ==
Preca became First Gentleman in April 2014 when his wife assumed the office of president. Even though Marie Louise is the second woman to serve as president of Malta, Preca is the first male spouse of a Maltese president and thus the first to hold the title First Gentleman. Agatha Barbara, who was Malta's first female president from 1982 until 1987, was never married.

Upon becoming First Gentleman, Preca also became the chairman of the Malta Community Chest Fund, which is a charitable non-governmental institution aimed to help philanthropic institutions and individuals. He also visited other countries on behalf of the Maltese government, including a three-day visit to Algeria in January 2016.

== See also ==
- President of Malta

== Honours ==
=== Foreign Honours ===
- Italy: Knight Grand Cross of the Order of Merit of the Italian Republic (10 January 2018)
- Portugal: Grand Cross of the Order of Merit (15 May 2018)
- Sovereign Military Order of Malta: Grand Cross pro Merito Melitensi of the Order pro Merito Melitensi (2015)

Honorary titles
Preceded by Margaret Abela as First Lady	First Gentleman of Malta; 2014–2019	Succeeded by Miriam Vella as First Lady
