= Manwel Dimech Bridge =

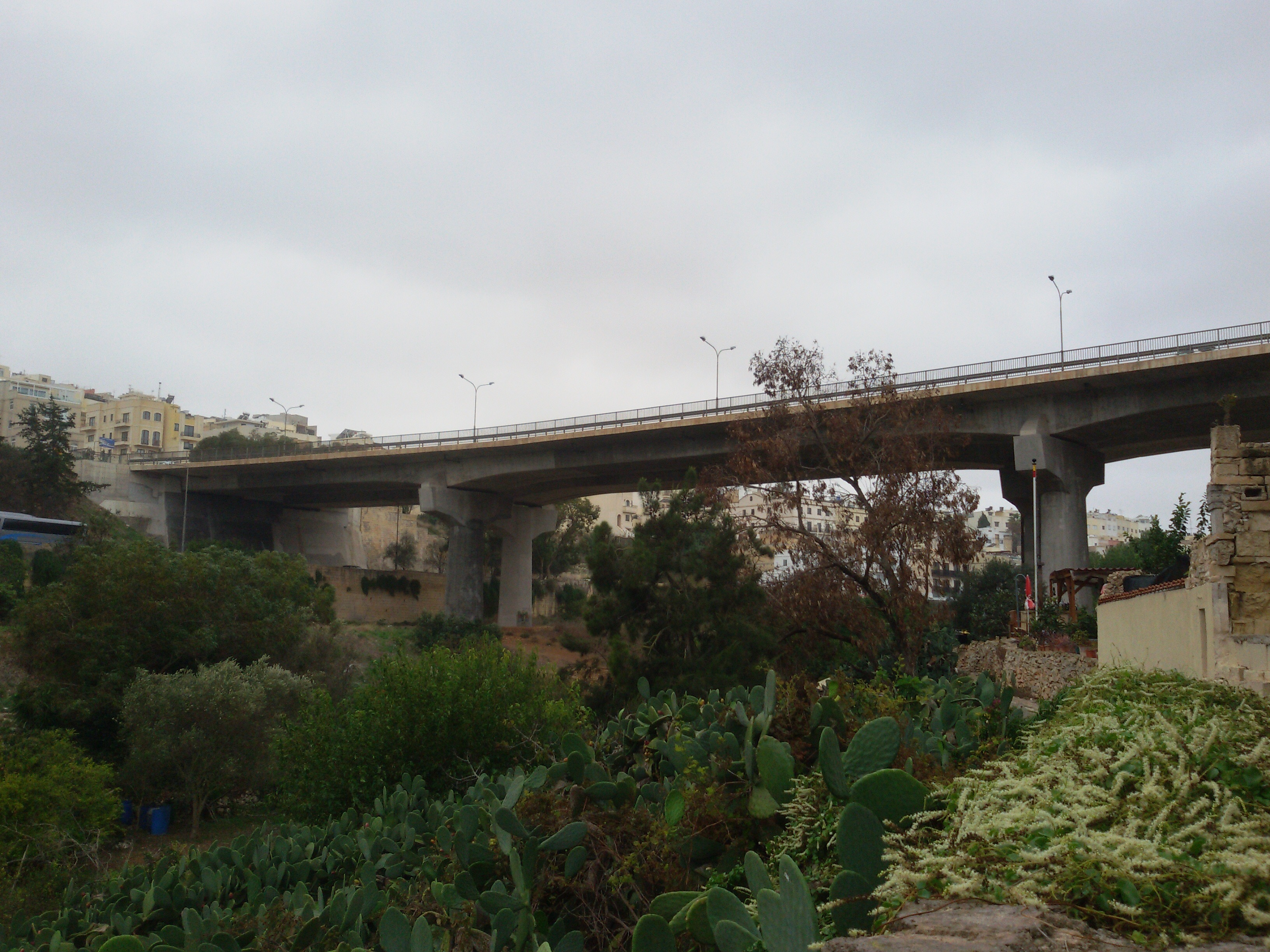
- East view
- Coordinates: 35°54′58″N 14°29′10.4″E
- Carries: Four lanes
- Crosses: Wied Għomor
- Locale: San Ġiljan, Malta

Characteristics
- Total length: 130 m (426.5 ft)
- Width: 32 m (105.0 ft)
- Clearance below: 40 m (131.2 ft)
- Design life: Modern bridge

History
- Opened: 18 September 1971; 53 years ago

Manwel Dimech Bridge is a beam bridge at St. Julian's, Malta. It is named after Manuel Dimech and was officially inaugurated on 18 September 1971 by the Minister of Public Works, Lorry Sant. The bridge is approximately 130m long and 32m wide, and spans over Wied Għomor. It is part of Mikiel Anton Vassalli Road (popularly known as Regional Road) just beyond the tunnels on the way to Paceville and St. Andrew's. A commemorative plaque close to the bridge reports that the construction of the bridge, the road and the tunnels were aided by the Chinese government. The tunnels are named after Sun Yat-sen, and the bridge on the other side of the tunnels is named after Ġużè Ellul Mercer. The bridge was thoroughly restored and reinforced in 2008. The bridge is notable for hosting a secret meeting in the middle of the night between the then Prime Minister of Malta Eddie Fenech Adami and delinquent "Żeppi l-Ħafi" (literally Żeppi the barefoot). During the meeting, the two discussed about whether Żeppi should be given an immunity, even though Żeppi had done serious crimes back then including attempted murder, cocaine trafficking and burglary. The pair also met at a horse stable.
