= Henry Frendo =

Professor of modern history

Henry Frendo

Henry Joseph Frendo (born 29 August 1948) is a professor of modern history, teaching at the University of Malta since 1992. Frendo has previously worked with the UNHCR, and was stationed in Switzerland, Mozambique, Zimbabwe, Egypt and Papua New Guinea. His main areas of research and interest are related to history since 1798; related to imperialism, nationalism, decolonization, postcolonialism, journalism, migration and ethnicity - in Central and Eastern Europe, the Mediterranean and MENA. Other areas of his interest are languages, culture and statehood. He is from Floriana and is the brother of Michael Frendo.

== Bibliography ==
In 1970, Frendo completed his bachelor's degree in Maltese, English and history at the University of Malta. During the 1960s Frendo was involved in a number of youth and student groups. From 1968 to 1969 Frendo was chairman of a student-led campaign called ‘Djar ghall-Maltin’ (Houses for the Maltese), which aimed to secure low-cost housing and land planning in the wake of newly achieved independence from the British. From 1970 to 1971 Frendo was made editor-in-chief of daily Maltese newspaper called Il-Hajja (The Life).

In 1973, Frendo graduated with a master's in history from the University of Malta, with a thesis on the language-culture clash in the 19th – 20th century between traditional italianita’ – latinita’ adherents and utilitarian assimilationist pro-English supporters and the codification of the historic and enduring Maltese language. In the same year, Frendo became resident at University College at the University of Oxford in the United Kingdom. Frendo received his Doctor of Philosophy in Modern History from the University of Oxford in 1976. In his doctoral thesis, Frendo wrote on the formation of political parties in Malta under British rule, which was later published in his 1979 book Party Politics in a Fortress Colony. Frendo later returned to Malta, between 1976 and 1978, to be promoted from assistant lecturer to lecturer in history at the University of Malta.

In 1978, Frendo accepted a position with the United Nations High Commissioner for Refugees (UNHCR) at their headquarters in Geneva, after he encountered fierce resistance to his academic work by the Labour government. In 1979 Frendo was promoted to the position of programme officer in the Middle East and North Africa section, whilst still in Geneva. During his tenure there, Frendo was assigned to liaise in mass voluntary repatriation operations in Zimbabwe from neighbouring countries - such as Mozambique, Zambia and Botswana. In 1982 Frendo was assigned as the UNHCR's deputy representative to Egypt. There Frendo was awarded indefinite appointment by Kofi Annan, then serving as chief of personnel. From 1984 to 1985, Frendo was assigned as head of mission in Papua New Guinea where he was responsible for the first international assistance agreement between the UNHCR and the Papua New Guinea government.

From 1985 to 1988 Frendo was a senior lecturer in European political development, Commonwealth history and lllEthnic lllStudies at La Trobe University, Victoria, Australia. At this same time, Frendo also worked as a consultant with the Australian National University in Canberra on the Australian bicentennial social encyclopaedia, and as a consultant to the Victor Ethnic Affairs Commission where he set up Victoria's Legal Interpreting Services.

In 1988 Frendo returned to Malta, where he was appointed as associate professor of modern history with the university. In 1989 Frendo accepted a lllFellowship with the University of Salzburg, Austria. Since 1988 Frendo has been involved in extensive television, radio and journalist work. Frendo started off 1992 by being appointed a full-ranked professor in modern history at the University of Malta. In this same year, Frendo also appeared as a guest professor with the University of Augsburg in Germany lecturing in their faculty of philosophy and sociology. In 1993 Frendo was appointed Chairman of the European Cultural Foundation's Malta branch, a post which he held until 1997. From 1994 to 2001 Frendo served as Mayor of Attard (Malta) and as the president of the College of Mayors. In 1996 Frendo was elected a Life Member of Clare Hall at the University of Cambridge whilst there as a visiting fellow. From 1996 to 1998, Frendo was chairman of the Euro-Med Group and was head of delegation to the Congress of Local and Regional Authorities of Europe (CLRAE) for two terms.

In the summer of 2000 Frendo received a Fulbright Scholarship to lecture at Loyal University in New Orleans (US). In 2001 Frendo became the Vice-President of the CLRAE. In this same year, Frendo was appointed as the Maltese Ministry of Justice and Home Affairs’ Chairman of the Refugee Appeals Board in Valletta (Malta). In 2002 Frendo became a visiting professor at Indiana State University (USA). Frendo is also director of the Malta University Broadcasting Services Limited, where he also serves as co-editor of the Journal of Mediterranean Studies, editor of the Maltese history journal Storja and is vice-president of the University of Malta's History Society.

Since 2005 he was involved with the Centre of European Policy Studies 5-year Challenge programme on ‘Freedom and Security’. In 2006 Frendo was appointed guest professor at the University of Enna (Italy) where he lectured in contemporary history and politics of the Mediterranean. Frendo was the convenor of two international conferences on Migration, asylum and security: the Eastern and Southern border experiences; and The European Mind: Narrative and Identity for the International Society for the Study of European Ideas.

He is fluent in Arabic, English, French, Italian and Maltese.

== Selected publications ==
=== Books ===
- The European Mind: Narrative and Identity (Vol. I&II) (Malta: Malta University Press, 2010).
- Colonialismo e nazionalismo nel Mediterraneo. La lotta partitica a Malta durante l’occupazione inglese; tra assimilazione e resistenza (Studi Urbinati di Scienze Giuridiche, Politiche ed Economiche, Anno LXXV-2008, Nuova serie A-N.59.1 monografico, Universita’ di Studi di Urbino Carlo Bo, 2009).
- Nerik Mizzi: The Formative Years (Andrew P. Vella Memorial Lecture, Aula Magna, Valletta, Malta University History Society, 2009).
- Storja 1978–2008. 30th Anniversary Edition (Malta University History Society, 2008).
- Patrijott Liberali Malti: Biografija ta’ Gorg Borg Olivier 1911-1980 (Pin, Valletta, 2005)
- Storja 2003–2004. 25th Anniversary Edition (Malta University History Society, 2004)
- Zmien l-Inglizi: Is-Seklu Dsatax (KKM, Valletta, 2004)
- The Press and the Media in Malta (ENTIRE - The European Network for Trans-Integration Research, Working Papers in International Journalism, Dortmund Univ. Press, 2004)
- Europe Since 1945 (Advisory Editor; Encyclopaedia General Editor: Bernard Cook, Loyola/New Orleans; Garland, New York & London, 2001, 2 vols.);
- The Origins of Maltese Statehood: A Case Study of Decolonization in the Mediterranean (Peg, Valletta, 1999, 2nd ed., 2000, pp. 730 – with an Introduction by the Head of State, Professor Guido de Marco)
- Malta: Culture and Identity (Ed., with Oliver Friggieri; Ministry for the Arts, Valletta, 1994)
- Party Politics in a Fortress Colony: The Maltese Experience (Midsea, Valletta, 1979, 2nd ed., 1991)

=== Chapters in book ===
- ‘The Influence of Religion on Maltese Society: Past and Present’, in M. Farrugia (ed.), Hide and Seek: Reflections on Faith and Culture in Dialogue (MKSU/APS Bank, 2009)
- ‘Is-Sette Giugno: Stat, Poplu u Vjolenza f’Malta’, in M.J.Schiavone & L.Callus (eds.), Inservi (Pin, Valletta, 2009)
- ‘Pressures on Assumed Identity at the Border’, in M. Petricioli (ed.), L’Europe mediterraneenne – Mediterranean Europe (L’Europe et les Europes 19e et 20e siecles, Peter Lang, Bruxelles, 2008)
- ‘I Doveri dell’Uomo: Mazzinian Influences on Maltese Nationalism under British Rule’, in S. Mercieca (ed.), Malta and Mazzini: Proceedings of History Week (Malta Historical Society, Valletta, 2007)
- ‘Political Party Norms in European Law: The Case of Malta’ in Parteien im europaischen Vergleich, ed. Martin Morlock, Institut fur deutsches und europaisches Parteienrecht, Univ of Düsseldorf (a comparative study of European laws governing political parties, forthcoming 2006)
- ‘The Ghost of Borg Pisani: Awaiting Redemption, Whose Traitor Was He?” (Bologna Univ project on culture and memory, 2006)
- ‘Imperial Fortresses and Native Peoples: the Gibraltar-Malta Nexus’ (2006, Mediterranean Institute/Univ of Malta-Euromed/UNESCO ‘La Navigation du Savoir project’, ed.S. Mercieca et)
- ‘Problematiche Mediterranee’ (Provincia di Agrigento, ed. G. Allotta, 2004)
- ‘Life during the “British” period: Strains of Maltese Europeanity’, in Malta: Roots of a Nation (ed. Kenneth Gambin, Heritage Malta, Valletta, 1 May 2004), 101–118.
- ‘Malte’, Les finances locales dans les dix pays aderant a l’Union europeenne en 2004 (ed. Micheline Falzon, Marie-Pierre Peretti et Dominique Hoorens, Dexia Credit Local, Editions Dexia, 75015 Paris), 231–246.
- "Les Français à Malte, 1798-1800: réflexions sur une insurrection", in Bonaparte, les îls méditerrannéens et l'appel de l'Orient (Ed. François Pomponi, Cahiers de la Mediterranee/Centre de la Mediterranee Moderne et Contemporaire, Univ. de Nice, 1999), 143-151
- "L'Autonomie Locale Maltaise", in La democratie locale Nord-Sud: la Charte Europeenne de l'autonomie locale en action (Ed., Conseil de l'Europe, Strasbourg, 1996), 43-47
- "The Legacy of Colonialism: The Experience of Malta and Cyprus”, in The Development Process in Small States (Eds., D. G Lockhart, D. Drakakis-Smith and J. Schembri, Routledge, London, 1993], 151-160
- "Malta, Cyprus and Gibraltar: Self Identity in the British Mediterranean", in Islands and Enclaves: Nationalisms and Separatist Pressures in Island and Littoral Contexts (Ed., G. W. Trompf, Sterling, New Delhi, 1993)
- "Malta's ‘Coming Home': Edging Towards European Integration", in Christopher Pollaco, Malta-EEC Relations 1970-1990 (Mireva, Msida, Malta, 1992), i-v
- "Language and Nationhood in the Maltese Experience: Some Comparative and Theoretical Approaches", in Collegium Melitense Quatercentenary Celebrations, 1592-1992 (Eds., R. Ellul Micallef and S. Fiorini, Univ. of Malta, 1992), 439-470
- "Plurality and Polarity: Early Italian Fascism in Maltese Colonial Politics", in Malta: A Case Study in International Cross-Currents (Eds., S. Fiorini & V. Mallia-Milanes, Univ. of Malta, 1991), 227-240
- "The Second World War: A Short Introduction to The Epic of Malta", in The Epic of Malta: A Pictorial Survey of Malta during the Second World War (Ed.: Odhams (Watford) Ltd., c. 1943, foreword by Winston Churchill, facsimile ed., Malta, 1990), i-vi

=== Journals ===
- ‘Malte, un Carrefour de cultures et de civilisations’, Les Rendez-Vous de l’Histoire (Eds), 27 lecons d’histoire (Editions du Seuil, Paris, 2009)
- ‘Australian Press Perspectives of Lord Strickland’s Malta’, Journal of Imperial and Commonwealth History, vol. 37, no.3, (Sep., 2009), pp. 441–463.
- ‘Malta Post-Garibaldi’, Melita Historica, vol. xiv, no. 4 (2007)
- ‘History and Citizenship in a European Experience’, Keynote speech, European Standing Conference of History Teachers Associations/Conference Permanente Europeenne des Associations de Professeurs d’Histoire, Dolmen Hotel, Malta, Mar. 2006, publication forthcoming in Clio, The Hague, 2006
- ‘I Doveri dell’Uomo: Mazzinian Influences on Maltese Nationalism under British Rule’ (International Conference on Giuseppe Mazzini, Istituto Italiano di Cultura, Valletta, Proceedings being published in Melita Historica, 2006)
- “Coexistence in Modernity: A Euromed Perspective”, The European Legacy, Oxford, vol.10, no.3, 2005, 161-177 (Keynote speech delivered at the Univ of Navarra, Spain, 2004)
- “Czars, Knights and Republicans: The Malta Question in Paul I’s Time”, Storja 2004, 62-75 (paper delivered in St Petersburg, reprinted from Ruskii Vopros, Brno, Czech Republic, 2002, n. 3)
- “Ports, Ships and Money: The Origins of Corporate Banking in Valletta”, Journal of Mediterranean Studies, Valletta, vol. 12, n. 2 (2002), 327-350
- "The Naughty European Twins of Empire: The Constitutional Breakdown in Malta and Cyprus, 1930-1933, The European Legacy, Boston, iii, 1 [1998], 45-52 (Public Lecture delivered at Cambridge University, UK)
- "Everyday Life in ‘British' Malta", Storja 1998, 37-47
- "The EU Feeling: Forward Movement Towards Greater Collaboration", European Union Newsletter (Malta Delegation), xxii, 12 (1996), 8-10
- "Malte: un modele de la mediterranee europeenne", Technopolis Mediterranee, Paris, I (1996), 40-41
- "Britain's European Mediterranean: Language, Religion and Politics in Lord Strickland's Malta, 1927-1930", History of European Ideas, Oxford, xxi, 1, 1995, 47-65
- "Intra-European Colonial Nationalism: The Case of Malta, 1922-1927", Melita Historica, xi, 1 (1992), 79-93
- "Italy and Britain in Maltese Colonial Nationalism", History of European Ideas, Oxford, xv, 4-6 (1992), 733-739
- "Maltese-German Relations, 1965-1990", in 25th Anniversary of Diplomatic Relations between Malta and the Federal Republic of Germany (Special Supplement in The Sunday Times of Malta, Valletta, 1990], 2-4
