= Marie-Louise Coleiro Preca =

President of Malta from 2014 to 2019

Her Excellency Marie-Louise Coleiro Preca KUOM
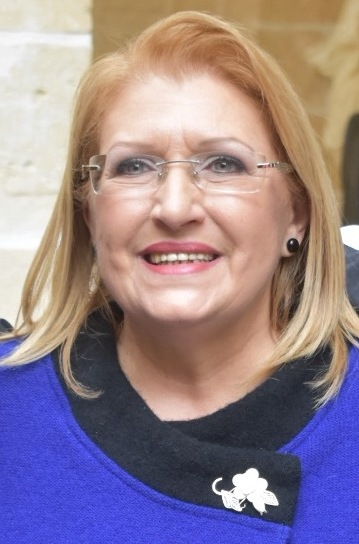
- Coleiro Preca in 2017

9th President of Malta
- In office 4 April 2014 – 4 April 2019
- Prime Minister: Joseph Muscat
- Preceded by: George Abela
- Succeeded by: George Vella

Minister for the Family and Social Solidarity
- In office 11 March 2013 – 29 March 2014
- Prime Minister: Joseph Muscat
- Preceded by: Chris Said (Justice, Public Dialogue, and Family)
- Succeeded by: Michael Farrugia

Member of Parliament
- In office 5 September 1998 – 1 April 2014

President of Eurochild
- Incumbent
- Assumed office 17 April 2019
- Preceded by: Hanna Heinonen (interim)

UNIDO goodwill ambassador
- Incumbent
- Assumed office 27 September 2018

President of the Malta Trust Foundation
- Incumbent
- Assumed office 14 May 2015

Personal details
- Born: Marie-Louise Coleiro; 7 December 1958 (age 67) Qormi, Malta
- Party: Labour Party
- Spouse: Edgar Preca (m. 2007)
- Children: 1
- Education: University of Malta

Marie-Louise Coleiro Preca, KUOM (born 7 December 1958) is a Maltese politician who was president of Malta from 2014 to 2019. She has been president of Eurochild since 2019.

Previously, as a member of the Labour Party, Coleiro Preca was a Member of Parliament (MP) in the House of Representatives of Malta from 1998 to 2014. She served as the minister for the family and social solidarity from 2013 to 2014 under Prime Minister Joseph Muscat.

== Early life and career ==
Born in Qormi, Coleiro Preca studied at the University of Malta where she graduated with a BA in Legal and Humanistic Studies (International Studies) and a notary public diploma.

Within the Labour Party, Coleiro Preca served within its executive. She was a member of the National Executive, the assistant general secretary, and as the general-secretary. She was the only woman to have served in such a senior post of a Maltese political party. In addition to these posts, Coleiro Preca was also a member of the National Bureau of Socialist Youths (now the Labour Youth Forum), President of the Women's Section of the Party (1996-2001), founding member of the Ġużè Ellul Mercer Foundation and publisher of the Party's weekly newspaper Il-Ħelsien (now defunct).

She served as MP in the Maltese Parliament from 1998 to 2014. In the 2008 general election she was the first elected MP. As an Opposition MP Coleiro Preca served as Shadow Minister for Social Policy and as member of the Parliamentary Permanent Committee for Social Affairs beginning in 1998.

After Alfred Sant resigned as Leader of the Labour Party in 2008, Coleiro Preca unsuccessfully contested the Leadership election.

She served on the Maltese delegation to the Parliamentary Assembly of the Council of Europe from 2008 to 2013.

Following the end of her tenure as President of Malta in April 2019, Coleiro Preca, under the newly set up Office of the President Emeritus Coleiro Preca, will continue to serve as Chair for the Malta Foundation for the Wellbeing of Society, The Emanuele Cancer Research Foundation Malta, and of the Malta Trust Foundation. Moreover, Coleiro Preca was appointed as President of Eurochild, during Eurochild's General Assembly in Brussels.

Marie-Louise Coleiro Preca is Goodwill Ambassador for the United Nations Industrial Development Organisation (UNIDO), Champion for UNIDO's Third Industrial Development Decade for Africa (IDDAIII) and Special Ambassador for the United Nations World Tourism Organisation (UNWTO).

Moreover, Marie-Louise Coleiro Preca is a member of the advisory board of Women Political Leaders Global Forum, and leads its #Girl2Leader Campaign. She is also chairperson of the senior advisory board of the Blockchain Charity Foundation (BCF).

== Presidency ==
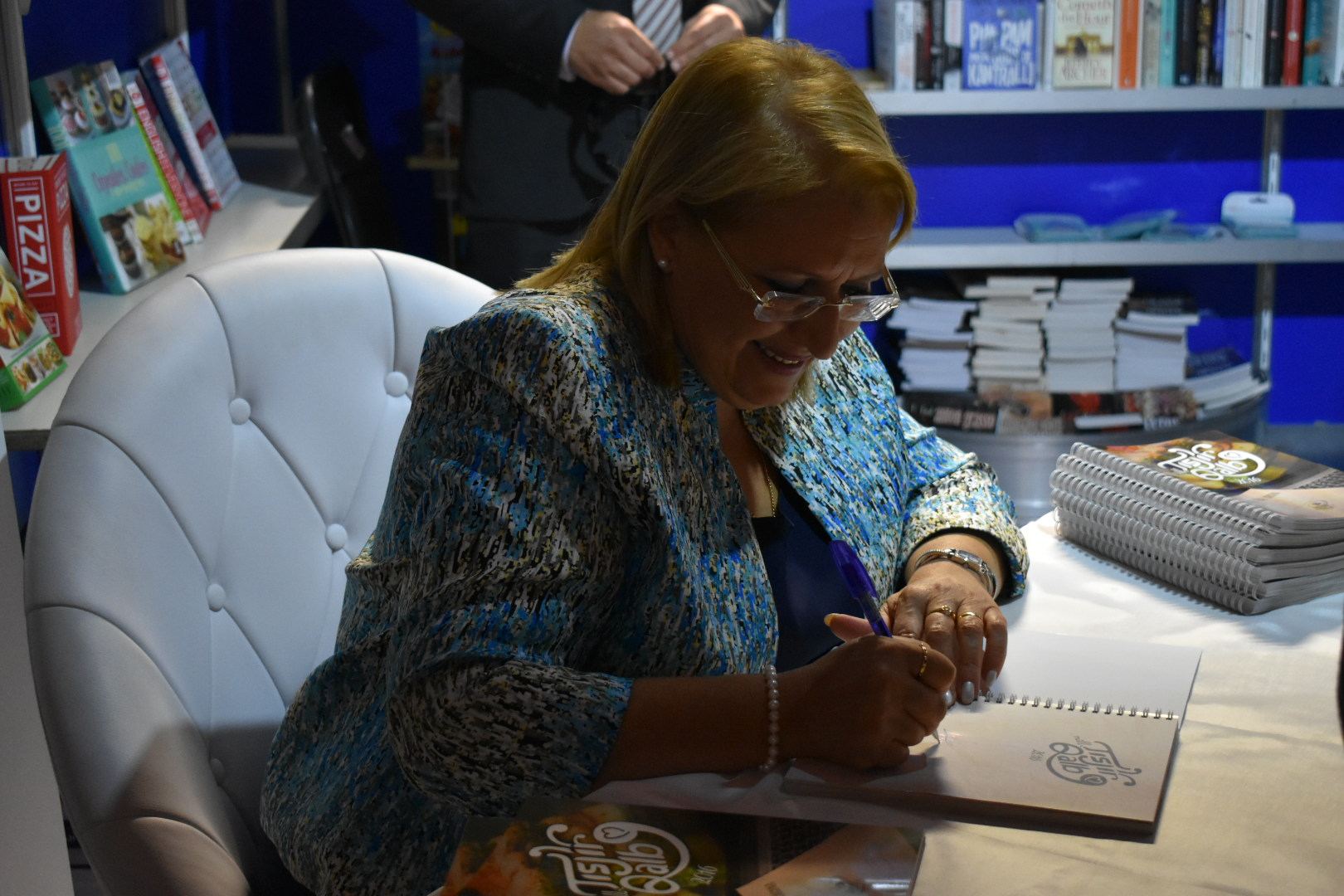
Coleiro Preca, as president, signing books at the MCC in Valletta

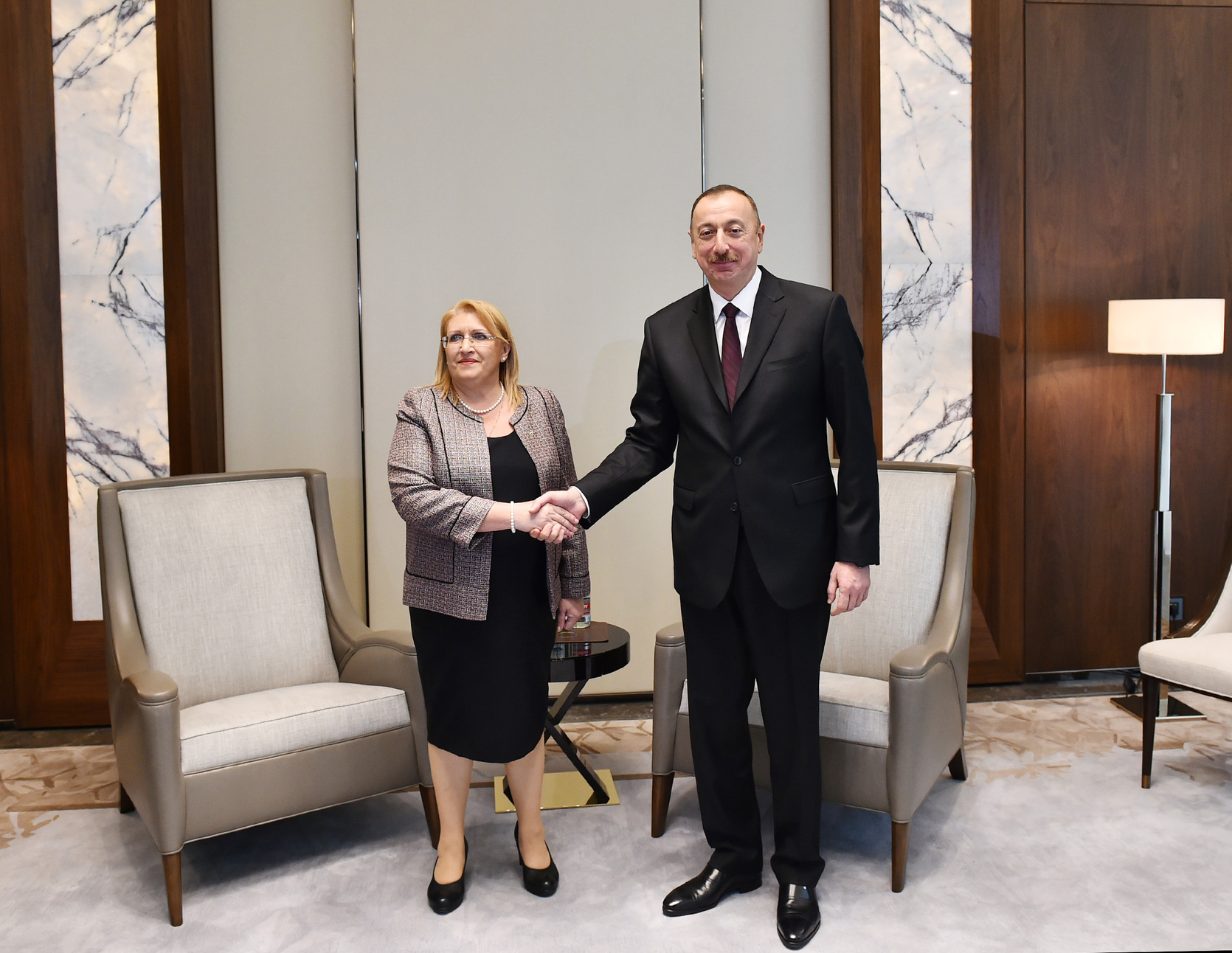
Preca with Azerbaijani president Ilham Aliyev in 2016

On 1 March 2014, Coleiro Preca accepted the nomination for president. Succeeding George Abela, she was sworn in as President on 4 April 2014. Coleiro Preca is the youngest person to assume the office of President, sworn in at the age of 55, and is the second woman to hold the post after Agatha Barbara.

=== The President's Foundation for the Wellbeing of Society ===
The president's Foundation for the Wellbeing of Society was established by Coleiro Preca on 25 June 2014. The Foundation is a non-governmental organization that focuses on community-building. The Foundation operates through a consultation process and conducts scientific research through five Research Entities:

- National Institute for Childhood
- National Centre for Family Research
- National Observatory for Living with Dignity
- National Centre for Freedom from Addictions
- National Hub for Ethnobotanical Research

=== The Malta Trust Foundation ===
Coleiro Preca founded the Malta Trust Foundation on 14 May 2015. The aim of this Foundation is to encourage vulnerable young people, experiencing difficulties in life, such as unemployment, being at risk of poverty, or social exclusion, to improve their lives through education and training.

=== The President's Secret Garden ===
The president's Secret Garden, one of the gardens in San Anton Palace, was opened to the public by Coleiro Preca in 2015. Coleiro Preca opened the garden in response to calls for more open play space for children.

=== Arraiolos Group ===
In 2015, Coleiro Preca was the first Maltese President to join the Arraiolos Group of non-executive Presidents of the European Union. The presidents meet annually to discuss current state of affairs and the future development of the European Union. Coleiro Preca hosted the Arraiolos 2017 in Malta.

=== Empower ===
On the Day of the Girl 2017, Coleiro Preca launched a platform, called Empower, "to encourage more women to participate in positions of influence and leadership, while also creating closer synergies among nationally-active groups for women". Empower is an umbrella organization of seventeen Maltese women's organizations.

=== The Emanuele Cancer Research Foundation Malta ===
The Emanuele Cancer Research Foundation Malta (ECRFM) was founded by The president's Trust, the Fondazione Terzo Pilastro, Italia e Mediterraneo, and the University of Malta. Coleiro Preca stated that "this new and most important venture will provide the much-needed research, development, and education about cancer, for the benefit of individuals, families, communities, and societies, across the Maltese Islands and the Mediterranean Region".

The foundation is located at the Biomedical Sciences Building at the University of Malta, supported by the Fondazione Terzo Pilastro, Italia e Mediterraneo.

== Honours and awards ==
=== Honours ===
==== National honours ====
- Malta: Former Grand Master Grand Cross with Collar of the Order of Merit

==== Foreign honours ====
- Algeria: Grand Cross with Collar of the Order of Merit (20 January 2016)
- Bulgaria: Grand Cross of the Order of the Balkan Mountains (2 November 2016)
- Bulgaria: Member with Collar of the Order of Cyril and Methodius (5 February 2018)
- Germany: Grand Cross Special Class of the Order of Merit of the Federal Republic of Germany, Special Class (29 April 2015)
- Italy: Grand Cross with Collar of the Order of Merit of the Italian Republic (7 September 2017)
  - Sovereign Military Order of Malta: Knight Grand Cross with Collar of the Order of Merit (21 April 2015)
- Portugal: Grand Cross with Collar of the Order of Infante Henry (15 May 2018)
- (Russian Empire) Russian Imperial Family: Dame of the Imperial Order of Saint Anastasia, 1st Class (14 June 2017)
- Tunisia: Grand Cross of the Order of the Republic (5 February 2019)
- Ukraine: Grand Cross with Collar of the Order of Prince Yaroslav the Wise (15 May 2017)
- United Kingdom: Honorary Dame Grand Cross with Collar of the Order of St Michael and St George (26 November 2015)

=== Awards ===
- UN Women and Global Partnership Forum Agent of Change Award
- Crans Montana Prix de la Fondation 2014
- Student Wellbeing and Prevention of Violence Award from Flinders University, South Australia
- WPL Award 2017 by Women Political Leaders Global Forum
- Ukraine International Person of the Year 2017 – For Political and Social Activity
- The ISESCO Gold Medal, for President Coleiro Preca's distinguished and tireless contribution, to the promotion of peace, in Malta, throughout the Mediterranean, and globally.
- International Virdimura Award 2018
- Premio Margutta – Sezione Empowerment

==== Honorary degrees ====
- Honorary Professor of Politics and International Studies, University of Warwick, 2015
- Honorary Doctor of Laws, University of Leicester, 2019

Political offices
Preceded by George Abela	President of Malta; 2014–2019	Succeeded by George Vella
