= George Abela =

President of Malta from 2009 to 2014

His Excellency George Abela KUOM
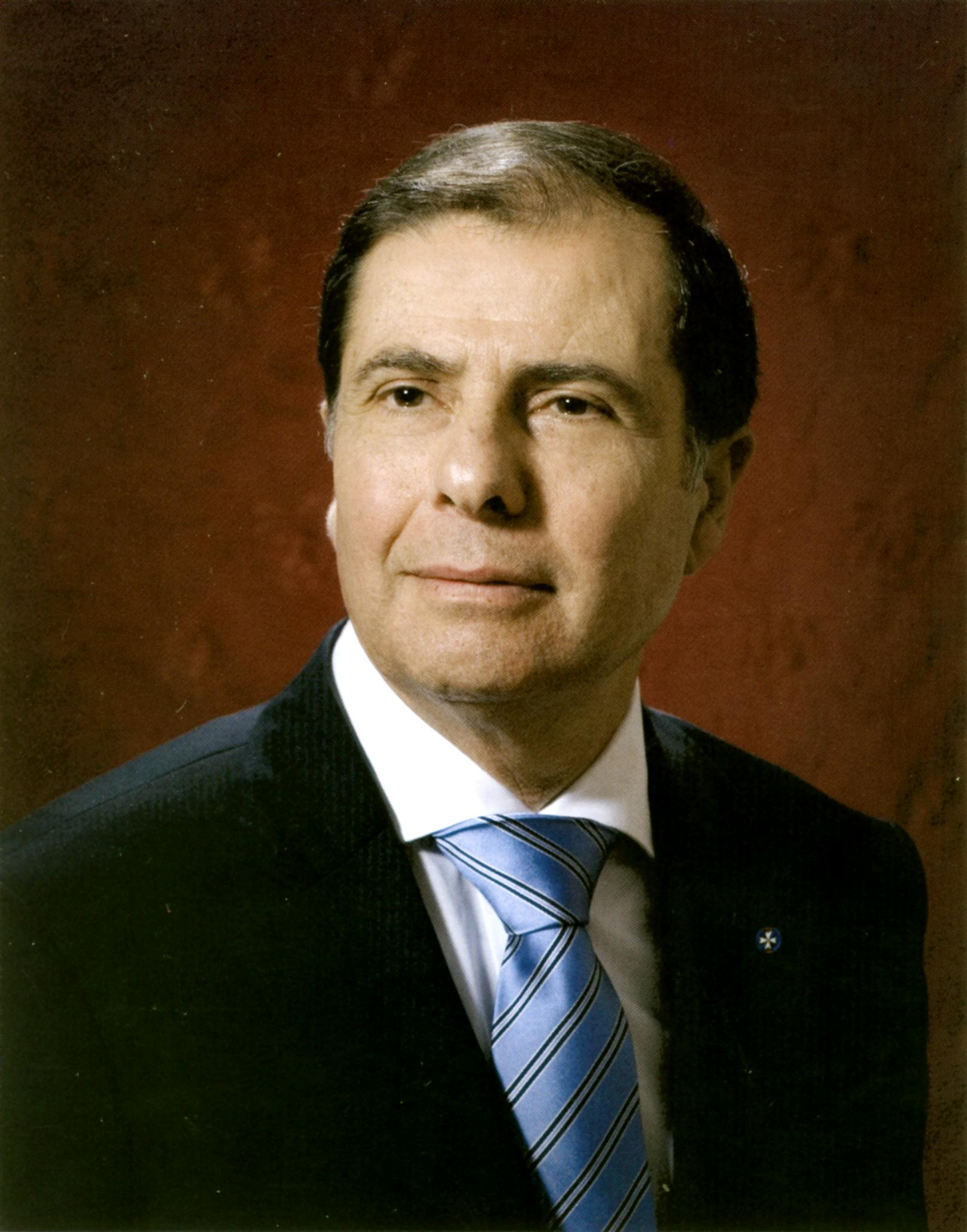

8th President of Malta
- In office 4 April 2009 – 4 April 2014
- Prime Minister: Lawrence Gonzi; Joseph Muscat
- Preceded by: Eddie Fenech Adami
- Succeeded by: Marie-Louise Coleiro Preca

Personal details
- Born: 22 April 1948 (age 78) Qormi, Crown Colony of Malta
- Party: Labour Party
- Spouse: Margaret Cauchi (1976–present)
- Children: Robert Abela; Marija Abela
- Education: University of Malta

George Abela, KUOM (born 22 April 1948) is a Maltese politician who was the eighth president of Malta from April 2009 to April 2014.

== Early life ==
Abela was born in Qormi, Malta, to George (1925 – 5 September 2010) and Ludgarda (née Debono) Abela (19 February 1930 – 11 February 2023). He attended the local primary school in Qormi and later pursued his secondary education at a lyceum in Hamrun. In 1965, he enrolled in the University of Malta, where he obtained his Bachelor of Arts degree. He continued his studies as a teacher for a short while and became a notary public and in 1975 he graduated as a lawyer. He was immediately hired by the General Workers Union as a legal consultant and worked within the Union for 25 years thereby obtaining considerable experience in employment law.

== Malta Football Association ==
In 1982, after serving as Qormi FC president, George Abela was elected as the chairman of the Malta Football Association. He brought changes within the MFA, and improved the infrastructure, where training grounds, a gymnasium, and a physiotherapy clinic were built, and artificial lighting was installed. The players of the Malta national football team were engaged for the first time in training on a professional basis.

== Labour Party ==
After ten years, in 1992, he left the post and took up the role of Deputy Leader responsible for Party Affairs within the Labour Party. Following the party's electoral win in 1996, he was appointed as a Legal Consultant to the Prime Minister, Alfred Sant, and therefore attended cabinet meetings. He resigned from this post in 1997 following disagreement with Prime Minister Alfred Sant. In 1998 he severed all ties with the Labour Party reportedly due to his disagreement with the party executive's decision to call an early election which was deemed necessary due to the parliamentary crisis at the time unfolding. In 2000 he fell out of favor with the General Workers' Union's administration and officially severed all ties with the organization.

Since 2000 he shifted focus to his private legal practice, acting as legal consultant to various government entities, including the Malta Environment and Planning Authority (MEPA) and the Malta European Union Steering Action Committee (MEUSAC). This, and his persistent public criticism of the Union, led media to speculate about a new-found affinity with the Nationalist administration, particularly with Prime Minister Edward Fenech Adami and Cabinet Minister Austin Gatt. These speculations proved to be very influential in the 2008 Labour leadership contest. He also acted as legal consultant to four newly set-up unions, including the Malta Dockers' Union.

He contested the election for new Leader of the Labour Party following Alfred Sant's resignation in 2008, together with Evarist Bartolo, Marie Louise Coleiro Preca, Joseph Muscat and Michael Falzon. The leadership contest was decided by means of a runoff between Abela and Muscat which took place on 6 June 2008. Abela placed second with 291 votes (33.64%), trailing Joseph Muscat who obtained 574 votes (66.36%). Newly elected Joseph Muscat immediately invited him to participate in party affairs under the new leadership, and Abela was appointed as the representative of the Labour Party on the Malta-EU Steering Action Committee (MEUSEC).

== Presidency ==
On 12 January 2009, Prime Minister Lawrence Gonzi announced that the Government was proposing George Abela as the next President of Malta. He was to succeed Eddie Fenech Adami, whose five-year term as President of Malta expired on 4 April 2009. This was the first time in Maltese history that the government nominated a President from the opposition. Abela resigned from MEUSAC and the Labour Party, paving the way for the succession. On 1 April 2009, the House of Representatives approved George Abela as the 8th President of the Republic. The motion was moved by Prime Minister Gonzi and seconded by Opposition Leader Joseph Muscat. On 4 April 2009 at noon, George Abela was sworn in as President of Malta by Speaker Louis Galea.

"There needs to be a reasonable dose of optimism and courage. But courage, optimism and hope are not enough. We need to develop our culture by learning to save our money and be cautious to not spend more than we can afford," Abela said.

On the morning of New Year's Day the President and his wife Margaret greeted Prime Minister Lawrence Gonzi and fellow Ministers within the President's Palace in Valletta.

"Abela said that neighboring countries were made to pay the price by placing new burdens on their people with austerity measures."

== Air Malta ==
George Abela was appointed to serve as mediator with Air Malta unions, including pilots, cabin crew, and ground crew. He was invited by the then Prime Minister, Joseph Muscat, to co-chair a committee that will bring the airline's four unions together to discuss a way forward.

== Personal life ==
George Abela is married to Margaret (née Cauchi) since 24 May 1976. They have two children, Robert (born 7 December 1977) and Marija (born 1983). Robert Abela was elected as prime minister of Malta in 2020, after gaining the leadership of the Malta Labour Party.

In July 2025, Abela and his wife were involved in a car crash in Fgura which left a woman dead and another in critical condition. The Abelas were discharged from hospital around a week later.

== Honours ==
=== National honours ===
- Malta : Companion of Honour of the National Order of Merit by right as a President of Malta

=== Foreign honours ===
- Lithuania : Grand Cross of the Order of Vytautas the Great (17/05/2012)
- Romania : Sash of the Order of the Star of Romania (2010)
- Spain : Grand Cross with Collar of the Order of Isabella the Catholic (20/11/2009)

Political offices
Preceded by Eddie Fenech Adami	President of Malta; 2009–2014	Succeeded by Marie Louise Coleiro Preca
