= Maltese Government 2003–2008 =

- 19th Cabinet of Malta
- Incumbent
- Date formed: 12 April 2003
- Date dissolved: 10 March 2008

People and organisations
- Head of state: Guido de Marco (2003-2004); Eddie Fenech Adami (2004-2008)
- Head of government: Eddie Fenech Adami (2003-2004); Lawrence Gonzi (2004-2008)
- Member party: Nationalist Party
- Opposition party: Malta Labour Party
- Opposition leader: Alfred Sant

History
- Election: 2003 general election
- Predecessor: Maltese Government 1998–2003
- Successor: Maltese Government 2008–2013

The Maltese Government 2003–2008 was the Government of Malta from 12 April 2003 to 10 March 2008. The Prime Ministers were Eddie Fenech Adami and Lawrence Gonzi

== Cabinet ==
Portfolio	Minister	Took office	Left office	Party
Prime Minister	Eddie Fenech Adami	12 April 2003	23 March 2004	Nationalist
Prime Minister	Lawrence Gonzi	23 March 2004	10 March 2008	Nationalist
Deputy Prime Minister	Lawrence Gonzi	12 April 2003	23 March 2004	Nationalist
Deputy Prime Minister	Tonio Borg	23 March 2004	10 March 2008	Nationalist
Minister for Communications and Competition Policy	Censu Galea	23 March 2004	10 March 2008	Nationalist
Minister for Communications and National Projects	Austin Gatt	23 March 2004	10 March 2008	Nationalist
Minister for Education, Employment, and Training	Louis Galea	23 March 2004	10 March 2008	Nationalist
Minister for Family and Social Security	Dolores Cristina	23 March 2004	10 March 2008	Nationalist
Minister for Finance	Lawrence Gonzi	23 March 2004	10 March 2008	Nationalist
Minister for Finance and Economic Affairs	John Dalli	12 April 2003	23 March 2004	Nationalist
Minister for Foreign Affairs	Joe Borg	12 April 2003	23 March 2004	Nationalist
Minister for Foreign Affairs	John Dalli	23 March 2004	3 July 2004	Nationalist
Minister for Foreign Affairs	Michael Frendo	3 July 2004	10 March 2008	Nationalist
Minister for Gozo	Giovanna Debono	12 April 2003	10 March 2008	Nationalist
Minister for Health	Louis Deguara	12 April 2003	10 March 2008	Nationalist
Minister for Information, Technology, and Investment	Austin Gatt	23 March 2004	10 March 2008	Nationalist
Minister for Justice and Home Affairs	Tonio Borg	12 April 2003	23 March 2004	Nationalist
Minister for Justice, Home Affairs, and Parliamentary Affairs	Tonio Borg	23 March 2004	10 March 2008	Nationalist
Minister for Resources and Infrastructure	Ninu Zammit	12 April 2003	10 March 2008	Nationalist
Minister for Rural Affairs	George Pullicino	12 April 2003	23 March 2004	Nationalist
Minister for Rural Affairs and Environment	George Pullicino	23 March 2004	10 March 2008	Nationalist
Minister for Social Policy and Parliamentary Affairs	Lawrence Gonzi	12 April 2003	23 March 2004	Nationalist
Minister for Tourism	Francis Zammit Dimech	12 April 2003	23 March 2004	Nationalist
Minister for Tourism, Arts, and Cultural Heritage	Francis Zammit Dimech	23 March 2004	10 March 2008	Nationalist
Minister for Transport and Communications	Censu Galea	12 April 2003	23 March 2004	Nationalist
Minister for Transport and Urban Development Projects	Jesmond Mugliett	23 March 2004	10 March 2008	Nationalist
Minister for Youth and Arts	Jesmond Mugliett	12 April 2003	23 March 2003	Nationalist
Minister for Youth and Sport	Louis Galea	23 March 2004	10 March 2008	Nationalist

== See also ==
- List of Maltese governments
- Maltese Government 2008–2013
- Maltese Government 2013–2018
