= Maltese Government 2008–2013 =

- 20th Cabinet of Malta
- Date formed: 10 March 2008
- Date dissolved: 11 March 2013

People and organisations
- Head of state: Eddie Fenech Adami (2008-2009); George Abela (2009-2013)
- Head of government: Lawrence Gonzi
- Member party: Nationalist Party
- Opposition party: Labour Party
- Opposition leader: Alfred Sant (2008); Charles Mangion (2008); Joseph Muscat (2008-2013)

History
- Election: 2008 general election
- Predecessor: Maltese Government 2003–2008
- Successor: Maltese Government 2013–2018

The Maltese Government 2008–2013 was the Government of Malta from 11 March 2008 to 10 March 2013. The Prime Minister was Lawrence Gonzi.

== Cabinet ==
Portfolio	Minister	Took office	Left office	Party
Prime Minister	Lawrence Gonzi	10 March 2008	11 March 2013	Nationalist
Deputy Prime Minister	Tonio Borg	10 March 2008	28 November 2012	Nationalist
Minister for Education	Dolores Cristina	10 March 2008	9 February 2010	Nationalist
Minister for Education and Employment	Dolores Cristina	6 January 2012	11 March 2013	Nationalist
Minister for Education, Employment, and Family	Dolores Cristina	9 February 2010	6 January 2012	Nationalist
Minister for Finance, Economy, and Investment	Tonio Fenech	10 March 2008	11 March 2013	Nationalist
Minister for Foreign Affairs	Tonio Borg	10 March 2008	28 November 2012	Nationalist
Minister for Foreign Affairs	Francis Zammit Dimech	28 November 2012	11 March 2013	Nationalist
Minister for Gozo	Giovanna Debono	10 March 2008	11 March 2013	Nationalist
Minister for Health, Elderly, and Community Care	Joe Cassar	9 February 2010	11 March 2013	Nationalist
Minister for Home Affairs	Lawrence Gonzi	30 May 2012	11 March 2013	Nationalist
Minister for Home and Parliamentary Affairs	Carmelo Mifsud Bonnici	6 January 2012	30 May 2012	Nationalist
Minister for Infrastructure, Transport, and Communications	Austin Gatt	10 March 2008	11 March 2013	Nationalist
Minister for Justice and Home Affairs	Carmelo Mifsud Bonnici	10 March 2008	6 January 2012	Nationalist
Minister for Justice, Public Dialogue, and Family	Chris Said	6 January 2012	11 March 2013	Nationalist
Minister for Social Policy	John Dalli	10 March 2008	9 February 2010	Nationalist
Minister for Tourism, Environment, and Culture	John Dalli	10 March 2008	9 February 2010	Nationalist
Minister for Tourism, Environment, and Culture	Mario de Marco	6 January 2012	11 March 2013	Nationalist

== See also ==
- List of members of the parliament of Malta, 2008–2013
- List of Maltese governments
- Maltese Government 2013–2018
