= Maltese Government 1998–2003 =

- 18th Cabinet of Malta
- Incumbent
- Date formed: 6 September 1998
- Date dissolved: 12 April 2003

People and organisations
- Head of state: Ugo Mifsud Bonnici (1998-1999); Guido de Marco (1999-2003)
- Head of government: Eddie Fenech Adami
- Member party: Nationalist Party
- Opposition party: Malta Labour Party
- Opposition leader: Alfred Sant

History
- Election: 1998 general election
- Predecessor: Maltese Government 1996–1998
- Successor: Maltese Government 2003–2008

The Maltese Government 1998–2003 was the Government of Malta from 6 September 1998 to 12 April 2003. The Prime Minister was Eddie Fenech Adami.

== Cabinet ==
Portfolio	Minister	Took office	Left office	Party
Prime Minister	Eddie Fenech Adami	6 September 1998	12 April 2003	Nationalist
Deputy Prime Minister	Guido de Marco	6 September 1998	29 March 1999	Nationalist
Deputy Prime Minister	Lawrence Gonzi	29 March 1999	12 April 2003	Nationalist
Minister for Economic Services	Josef Bonnici	6 September 1998	12 April 2003	Nationalist
Minister for Education	Louis Galea	6 September 1998	12 April 2003	Nationalist
Minister for Environment	Francis Zammit Dimech	6 September 1998	12 April 2003	Nationalist
Minister for Finance	John Dalli	6 September 1998	12 April 2003	Nationalist
Minister for Food, Agriculture, and Fisheries	Ninu Zammit	6 September 1998	12 April 2003	Nationalist
Minister for Foreign Affairs	Guido de Marco	6 September 1998	29 March 1999	Nationalist
Minister for Foreign Affairs	Joe Borg	29 March 1999	12 April 2003	Nationalist
Minister for Gozo	Giovanna Debono	6 September 1998	12 April 2003	Nationalist
Minister for Health	Louis Deguara	6 September 1998	12 April 2003	Nationalist
Minister for Justice	Tonio Borg	6 September 1998	12 April 2003	Nationalist
Minister for Social Policy	Lawrence Gonzi	6 September 1998	12 April 2003	Nationalist
Minister for Tourism	Michael Refalo	6 September 1998	12 April 2003	Nationalist
Minister for Transport and Communications	Censu Galea	6 September 1998	12 April 2003	Nationalist

== See also ==
- List of Maltese governments
- Maltese Government 2003–2008
