= Helen D'Amato =

Maltese politician

Commissioner of Children of Malta
- In office 20 May 2010 – 5 January 2016
- Preceded by: Carmen Zammit
- Succeeded by: Pauline Micelli

Member of the Parliament of Malta
- In office 5 December 1996 – 4 February 2008
- Preceded by: Ninu Zammit
- Succeeded by: Franco Debono

Personal details
- Political party: Nationalist Party
- Spouse: Carmel D'Amato
- Children: 3

Helen D'Amato is a Maltese politician and educator who was a member of the Parliament of Malta from 1996 to 2008 and Commissioner for Children of Malta from 2010 to 2016. She is a member of the Nationalist Party.

== Career ==
Before she was elected to Parliament, D'Amato was a schoolteacher and a judicial assistant in Malta's juvenile court.

=== Member of Parliament ===
D'Amato was first elected to Parliament as a member of the Nationalist Party on 14 November 1996, and was sworn in the following month on 5 December. She was re-elected to the legislature two years later, and chaired the Social Affairs Committee from 1998 to 2004. In the 2003 general election, she received fewer votes than Ninu Zammit and Louis Galea, but filled Galea's seat because he was also elected in a separate district. D'Amato actively supported Lawrence Gonzi's successful 2004 campaign for prime minister, and was appointed by Gonzi as parliamentary secretary for the elderly and community care in March 2004, shortly after he took office. She ran for re-election in 2008 but was defeated by Franco Debono. She was considered a potential contender for Speaker of the House in 2010 after the departure of then-Speaker Galea, but the position was ultimately filled by Michael Frendo.

=== Commissioner for Children ===
D'Amato was nominated to succeed the outgoing Commissioner for Children, Carmen Zammit, in May 2010. After discussion in the Parliament's Social Affairs Committee, she was officially appointed to a three-year term as commissioner on 20 May. D'Amato was the third person to hold the position, which was established in 2003.

After media reports of underage Maltese girls being paid to dance in lingerie outfits at teen parties, D'Amato drafted legislative proposals to regulate the parties, including imposing a mandatory curfew and age limit, banning pole dancing, conducting background checks on party organisers, and increasing restrictions on alcohol. In 2013, she and Helena Dalli introduced a proposal to update safety standards for children's indoor play facilities. She also proposed an increase in the legal drinking age in Malta from 17 to 18 years old. D'Amato successfully advocated for amendments to Malta's Education Act to prohibit corporal punishment. She opposed a 2015 proposal to lower Malta's age of consent from 18 to 16 years old.

Though D'Amato's three-year term as commissioner was set to officially expire in May 2013, she remained in the role until a replacement was appointed in November 2015. After the government consulted hundreds of children on the ideal qualities for a commissioner, educator and Naxxar city councillor Pauline Micelli was selected to succeed D'Amato beginning on 5 January 2016.

=== Other activities ===
In June 2020, the Nationalist Party appointed D'Amato to an eight-member Candidates Commission to recruit election candidates for the party.

== Personal life ==
She is married to Carmel D'Amato. They have two sons and a daughter.
