= 1996 Maltese general election =

| ← 1992 | 26 October 1996 | 1998 → |

All 69 seats in the House of Representatives 35 seats needed for a majority
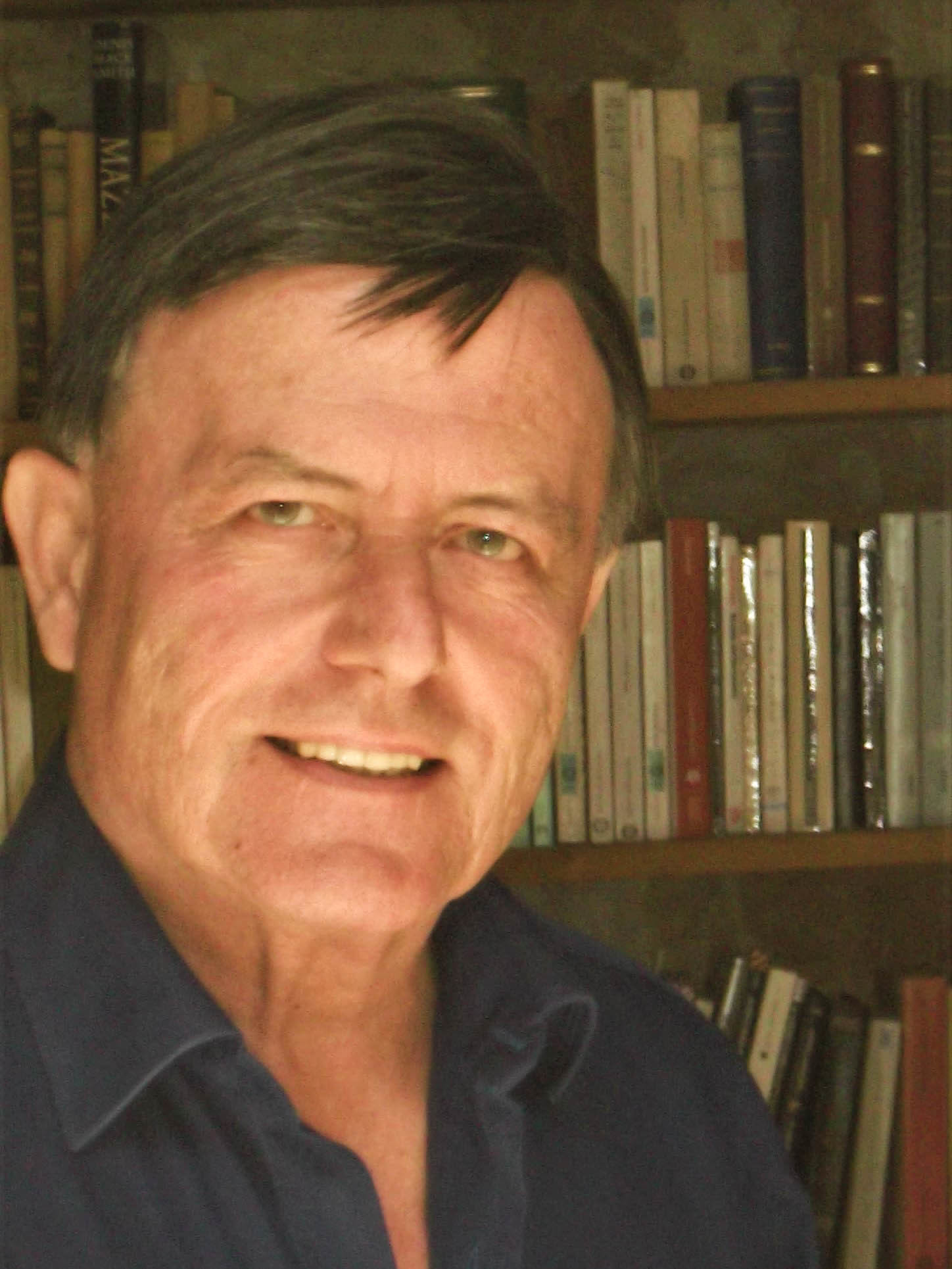

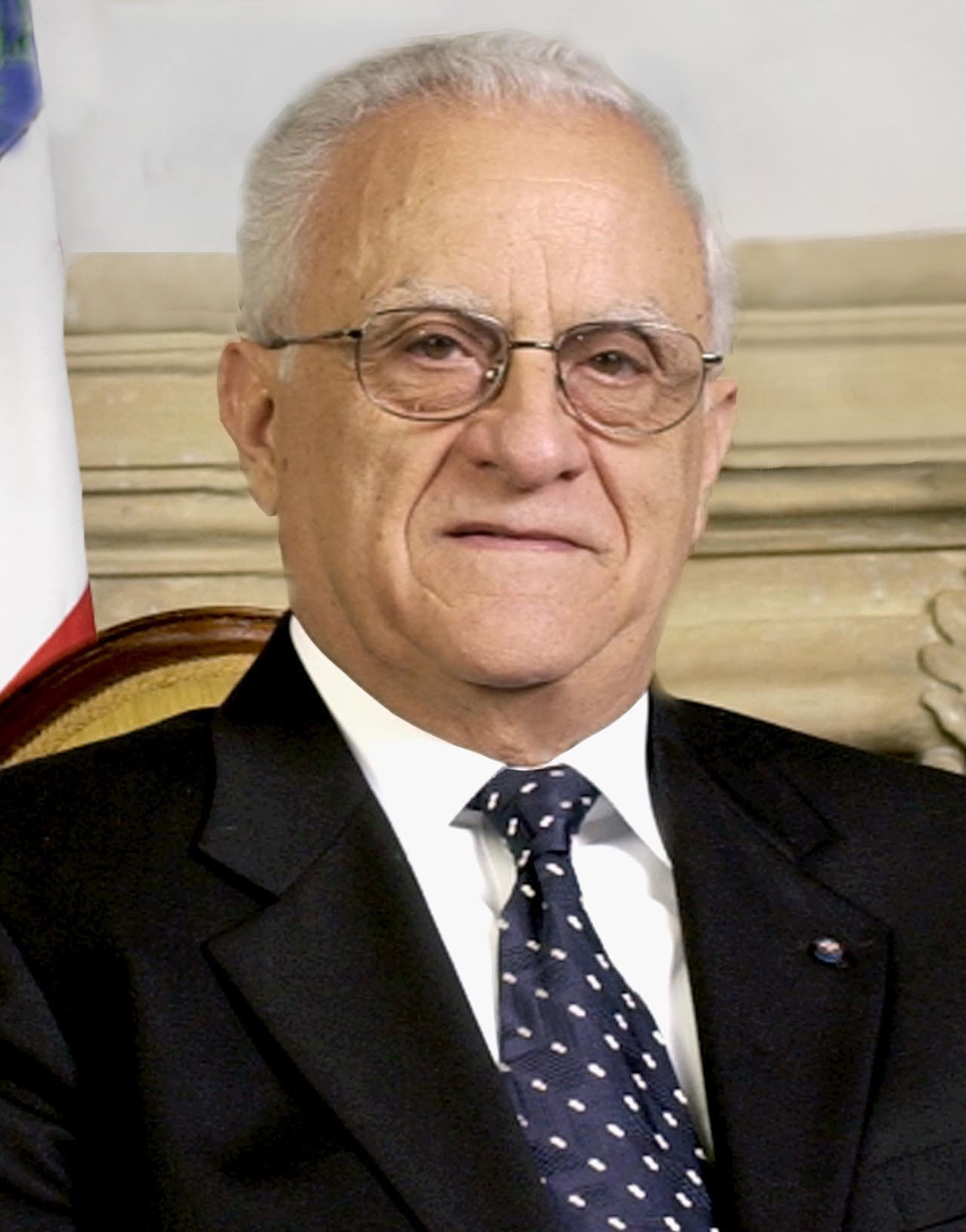
| | First party | Second party |
|---|---|---|
| Leader | Alfred Sant | Eddie Fenech Adami |
| Party | Labour | Nationalist |
| Last election | 46.50%, 31 seats | 51.77%, 34 seats |
| Seats won | 35 | 34 |
| Seat change | ▲4 | Steady |
| Popular vote | 132,496 | 124,864 |
| Percentage | 50.72% | 47.80% |
| Swing | ▲4.22pp | ▼3.97pp |
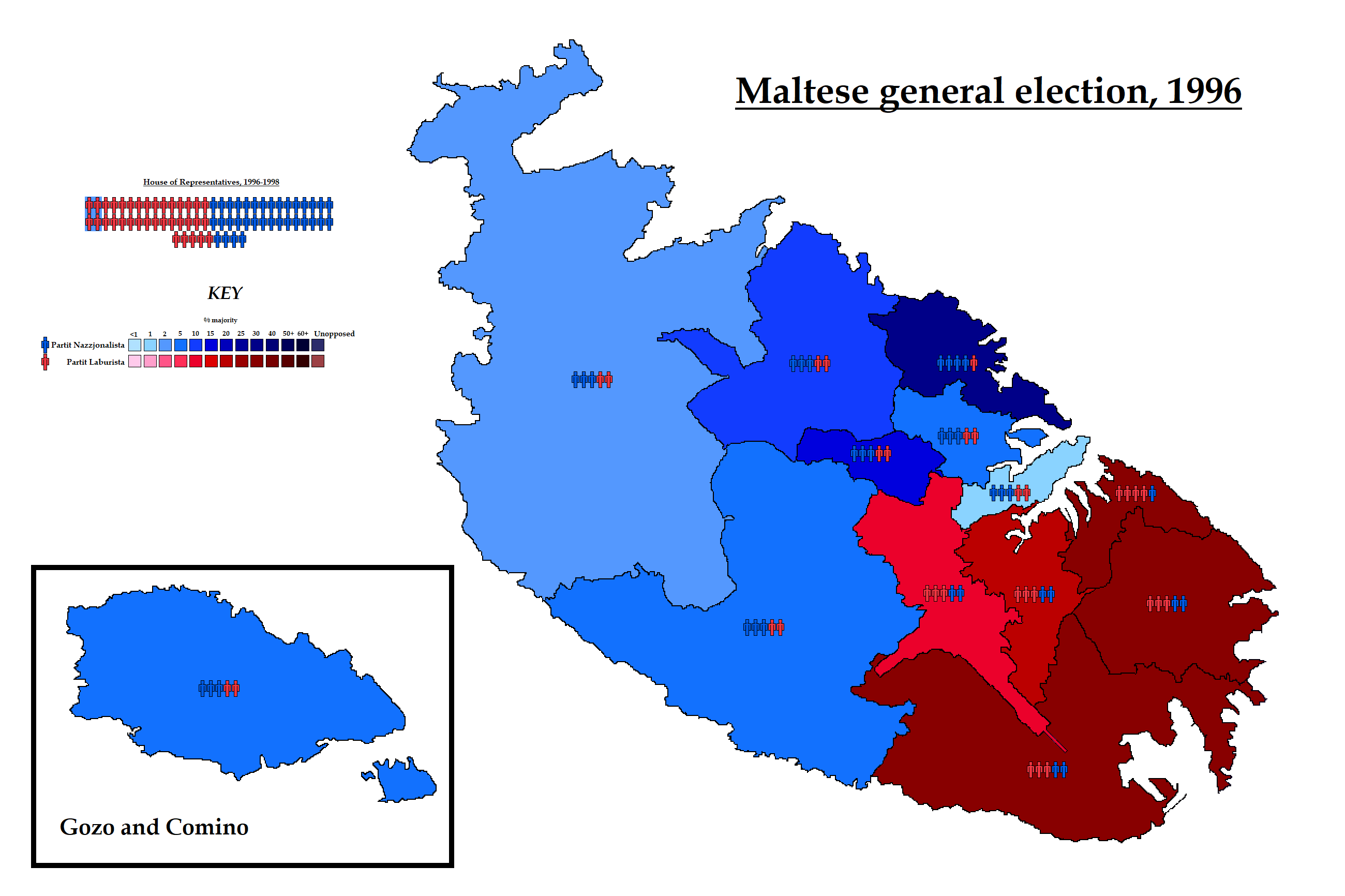
Prime Minister before election
Eddie Fenech Adami
Nationalist
Elected Prime Minister
Alfred Sant
Labour

General elections were held in Malta on 26 October 1996. Although the Malta Labour Party received the most votes, the Nationalist Party won the most seats. However, the Labour Party was awarded an additional four seats to ensure they had a majority in Parliament.

== Results ==
| Party | Votes | % | Seats | +/– |
|---|---|---|---|---|
| Malta Labour Party | 132,497 | 50.72 | 35 | +4 |
| Nationalist Party | 124,864 | 47.80 | 34 | 0 |
| Democratic Alternative | 3,820 | 1.46 | 0 | 0 |
| Independents | 43 | 0.02 | 0 | 0 |
| Total | 261,224 | 100.00 | 69 | +4 |
| Valid votes | 261,224 | 98.93 | | |
| Invalid/blank votes | 2,813 | 1.07 | | |
| Total votes | 264,037 | 100.00 | | |
| Registered voters/turnout | 274,113 | 96.32 | | |
Source: Nohlen & Stöver

=== By district ===
==== 1st District ====
- AD: 216 votes
- MLP: 9,870 votes
- PN: 10,101 votes
- Others: 18 votes
- Candidates elected: Alfred Sant (MLP), Sandro Schembri Adami (MLP), Guido de Marco (PN), Antoine Mifsud Bonnici (PN), Austin Gatt (PN)

==== 2nd District ====
- AD: 231 votes
- MLP: 13,645 votes
- PN: 6,006 votes
- Candidates elected: Dom Mintoff (MLP), Joe Mizzi (MLP), Edwin Grech (MLP), Chris Agius (MLP), Lawrence Gonzi (PN)

==== 3rd District ====
- AD: 289 votes
- MLP: 12,941 votes
- PN: 6,731 votes
- Others: 12 votes
- Candidates elected: George Vella (MLP), Alfred Portelli (MLP), Helena Dalli (MLP), Francis Agius (PN), Joe Psaila Savona (PN)

==== 4th District ====
- AD: 313 votes
- MLP: 12,750 votes
- PN: 7,668 votes
- Candidates elected: Joe Cilia (MLP), Joe Cassar (PN), Jesmond Mugliett (PN), Alex Sceberras Trigona (MLP), Karl Chircop (MLP)

==== 5th District ====
- AD: 258 votes
- MLP: 12,932 votes
- PN: 6,726 votes
- Candidates elected: George Vella (MLP), Karmenu Vella (MLP), Louis Buhagiar (MLP), Ninu Zammit (PN), Louis Galea (PN)

==== 6th District ====
- AD: 170 votes
- MLP: 11,119 votes
- PN: 8,472 votes
- Candidates elected: Charles Mangion (MLP), Lino Spiteri (MLP), John Attard Montalto (MLP), John Dalli (PN), George Hyzler (PN)

==== 7th District ====
- AD: 368 votes
- MLP: 9,715 votes
- PN: 11,025 votes
- Candidates elected: Louis Galea (PN), Charles Buhagiar (MLP), Micheal Bonnici (PN), Jeffry Pullicino Orlando (PN), John Attard Montalto (MLP)

==== 8th District ====
- AD: 336 votes
- MLP: 7,663 votes
- PN: 11,468 votes
- Candidates elected: Eddie Fenech Adami (PN), Alfred Sant (MLP), Joe Debono Grech (MLP), Tonio Borg (PN), Josef Bonnici (PN)

==== 9th District ====
- AD: 336 votes
- MLP: 8,863 votes
- PN: 10,253 votes
- Candidates elected: Adrian Vassallo (MLP), Leo Brincat (MLP), Francis Zammit Dimech (PN), Joe Borg (PN), John Vella(PN)

==== 10th District ====
- AD: 461 votes
- MLP: 5,834 votes
- PN: 13,870 votes
- Candidates elected: Evarist Bartolo (MLP), Guido de Marco (PN), Michael Refalo (PN), Francis Zammit Dimech (PN), Michael Frendo (PN)

==== 11th District ====
- AD: 359 votes
- MLP: 8,700 votes
- PN: 11,459
- Candidates elected: Eddie Fenech Adami (PN), Louis Deguara (PN), Josef Bonnici (PN), Michael Farrugia (MLP), Angelo Farrugia (MLP)

==== 12th District ====
- AD: 276 votes
- MLP: 9,400 votes
- PN: 10,382 votes
- Others: 13 votes
- Candidates elected: Noel Farrugia (MLP), Ċensu Galea (PN), Evarist Bartolo (MLP), Claude Muscat (PN), Tony Abela (PN)

==== 13th District ====
- AD: 168 votes
- MLP: 9,066 votes
- PN: 10,700 votes
- Candidates elected: Giovanna Debono (PN), Anton Refalo (MLP), Anton Tabone (PN), Karmenu Borg (MLP), Victor Galea Pace (PN)
