= George Pullicino =

Maltese politician (born 1964)

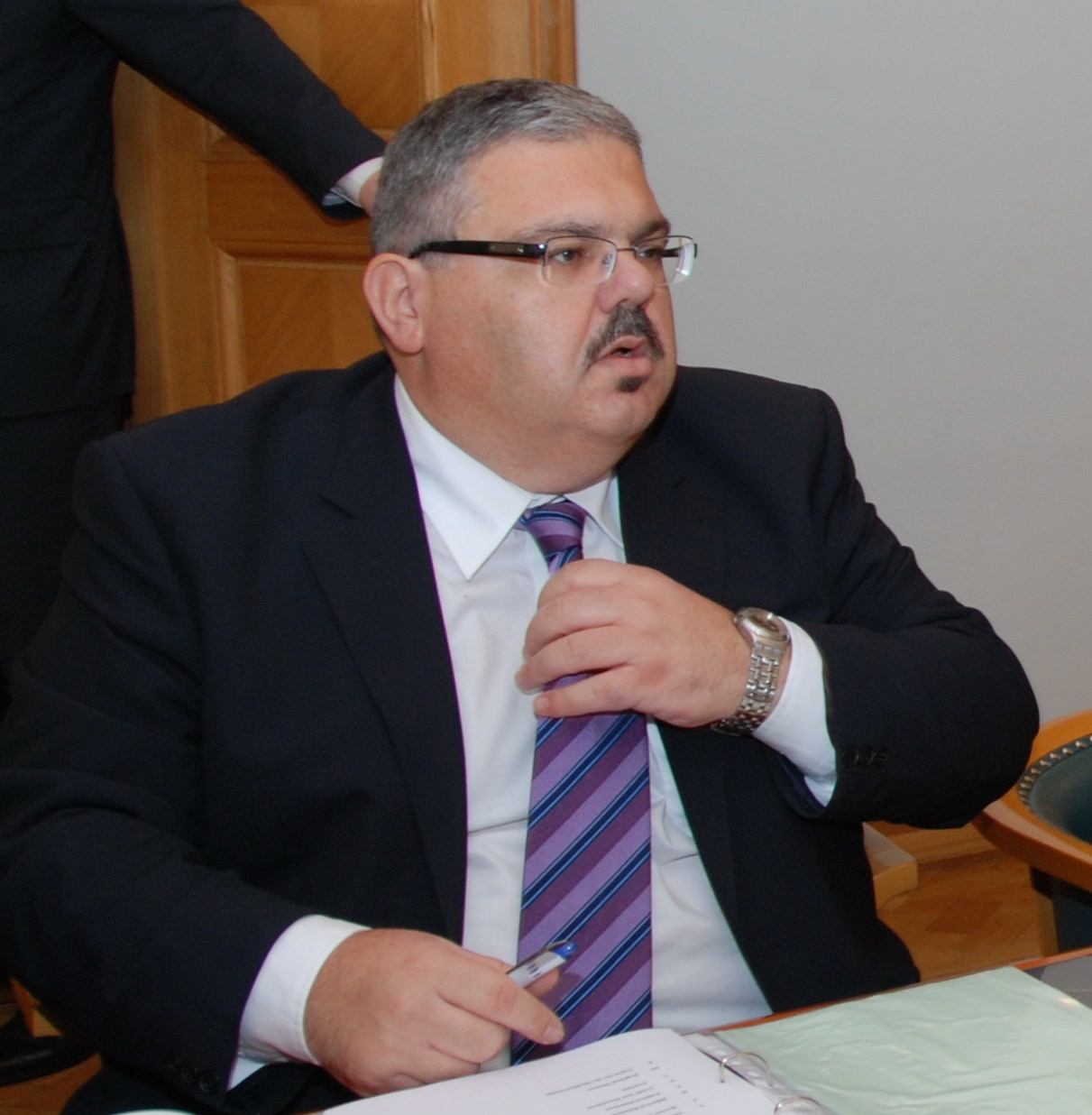
- George Pullicino in 2009.

Minister for Resources and Rural Affairs
- In office 12 April 2003 – 10 March 2013
- President: Guido de Marco; Eddie Fenech Adami; George Abela
- Prime Minister: Eddie Fenech Adami; Lawrence Gonzi
- Preceded by: Ninu Zammit

Personal details
- Born: 12 May 1964 (age 62) Sliema
- Party: Nationalist Party
- Spouse: Maria Lourdes
- Children: Mattea Pullicino

George Pullicino (born 12 May 1964) is a former Maltese politician, who served as Minister for Resources and Rural Affairs in a number of Nationalist Governments (Maltese: Ministru għal l-Affarijiet Rurali u r-Riżorsi).

== Education ==
He finished his education at the University of Malta as an architect and specializing in urban planning.

== Political career ==
As a Nationalist Party candidate, Pullicino unsuccessfully contested the 1992 general election before being elected to the House of Representatives of Malta in the 1996 general election; he was re-elected in the September 1998 general election. Following the 1998 election, in which the Nationalist Party returned to power, Pullicino was appointed as Parliamentary Secretary in the Ministry for Home Affairs; he was subsequently named as Parliamentary Secretary in the Ministry for Home Affairs and the Environment in March 2002.

Pullicino was appointed as Minister for Rural Affairs and the Environment after the April 2003 general election, with a portfolio that included the Agriculture and Fisheries sectors, Rural Development, the Environment and the Malta Environment and Planning Authority (MEPA).

Pullicino was retained in his position in the March 2004 Cabinet reshuffle with a portfolio that was expanded to include implementation of a Waste Management Strategy for the Maltese Islands.

Following the March 2008 general election, which the Nationalists won by a narrow margin, Pullicino was retained in his post, but the Malta Environmental Planning Authority (MEPA) was retained by Prime Minister Lawrence Gonzi. He served as a Nationalist Member of Parliament, after the 2013 General Election, but failed to be re-elected in 2017.
