= List of Maltese governments =

This is a list of Maltese governments from the creation of the first self-Government of Malta in 1921. Malta was a colony of the United Kingdom up to 1964, when it became an independent sovereign state and a constitutional monarchy like many other ⁣⁣⁣⁣British Commonwealth⁣ countries. Malta became a republic in 1974.

Date	Allegiance (pre-1964) / Head of State (post-1964)	Head of Government	Party in Office	Government of Malta
1921	George V	Joseph Howard	Maltese Political Union	Maltese Government 1921–24
1923	George V	Francesco Buhagiar	Maltese Political Union	Maltese Government 1921–24
1924	George V	Ugo Pasquale Mifsud	Nationalist Party	Maltese Government 1924–27
1927	George V	Gerald Strickland	Constitutional Party	Maltese Government 1927–32
1932	George V	Ugo Pasquale Mifsud	Nationalist Party	Maltese Government 1932–33
Self-government withheld (2 November 1933 – 4 November 1947)
1947	George VI	Paul Boffa	Labour Party	Maltese Government 1947–50
1949	George VI	Paul Boffa	Worker's Party	Maltese Government 1947–50
1950	George VI	Enrico Mizzi	Nationalist Party	Maltese Government 1950–51
1950	George VI	Giorgio Borġ Olivier	Nationalist Party	Maltese Government 1950–51
1951	George VI	Giorgio Borġ Olivier	Nationalist Party	Maltese Government 1951–53
1952	Elizabeth II	Giorgio Borġ Olivier	Nationalist Party	Maltese Government 1951–53
1953	Elizabeth II	Giorgio Borġ Olivier	Nationalist Party	Maltese Government 1953–55
1955	Elizabeth II	Dom Mintoff	Labour Party	Maltese Government 1955–58
Self-government withheld (26 April 1958 – 5 March 1962)
1962	Elizabeth II	Giorgio Borġ Olivier	Nationalist Party	Maltese Government 1962–66
1966	Elizabeth II	Giorgio Borġ Olivier	Nationalist Party	Maltese Government 1966–71
1971	Elizabeth II	Dom Mintoff	Labour Party	Maltese Government 1971–76
1974	Anthony Mamo	Dom Mintoff	Labour Party	Maltese Government 1971–76
1976	Anton Buttigieg	Dom Mintoff	Labour Party	Maltese Government 1976–81
1981	Albert Hyzler (interim)	Dom Mintoff	Labour Party	Maltese Government 1981–87
1982	Agatha Barbara	Dom Mintoff	Labour Party	Maltese Government 1981–87
1984	Agatha Barbara	Karmenu Mifsud Bonnici	Labour Party	Maltese Government 1981–87
1987	Paul Xuereb (interim)	Eddie Fenech Adami	Nationalist Party	Maltese Government 1987–92
1989	Ċensu Tabone	Eddie Fenech Adami	Nationalist Party	Maltese Government 1987–92
1992	Ċensu Tabone	Eddie Fenech Adami	Nationalist Party	Maltese Government 1992–96
1994	Ugo Mifsud Bonnici	Eddie Fenech Adami	Nationalist Party	Maltese Government 1992–96
1996	Ugo Mifsud Bonnici	Alfred Sant	Labour Party	Maltese Government 1996–98
1998	Ugo Mifsud Bonnici	Eddie Fenech Adami	Nationalist Party	Maltese Government 1998–2003
1999	Guido de Marco	Eddie Fenech Adami	Nationalist Party	Maltese Government 1998–2003
2003	Guido de Marco	Eddie Fenech Adami	Nationalist Party	Maltese Government 2003–08
2004	Eddie Fenech Adami	Lawrence Gonzi	Nationalist Party	Maltese Government 2003–08
2008	Eddie Fenech Adami	Lawrence Gonzi	Nationalist Party	Maltese Government 2008–13
2009	George Abela	Lawrence Gonzi	Nationalist Party	Maltese Government 2008–13
2013	George Abela	Joseph Muscat	Labour Party	Maltese Government 2013–17
2014	Marie Louise Coleiro Preca	Joseph Muscat	Labour Party	Maltese Government 2013–17
2017	Marie Louise Coleiro Preca	Joseph Muscat	Labour Party	Maltese Government 2017–22
2019	George Vella	Joseph Muscat	Labour Party	Maltese Government 2017–22
2020	George Vella	Robert Abela	Labour Party	Maltese Government 2017–22
2022	George Vella	Robert Abela	Labour Party	Maltese Government 2022–2026
2023	George Vella	Robert Abela	Labour Party	Maltese Government 2022–2026
2024	Myriam Spiteri Debono	Robert Abela	Labour Party	Maltese Government 2022–2026
2026	Myriam Spiteri Debono	Robert Abela	Labour Party	Maltese Government 2026–2031
