= Maltese Government 2013–2017 =

Government of Malta from 2013–17

- 21st Cabinet of Malta
- Incumbent
- Date formed: 11 March 2013
- Date dissolved: 1 May 2017

People and organisations
- Head of state: George Abela (2013–2014); Marie Louise Coleiro Preca (2014–2017)
- Head of government: Joseph Muscat
- Total no. of members: 16
- Member party: Labour Party
- Opposition party: Nationalist Party
- Opposition leader: Lawrence Gonzi (2013); Simon Busuttil (2013–2017)

History
- Election: 2013 general election
- Predecessor: Maltese Government 2008–2013
- Successor: Maltese Government 2017–2022

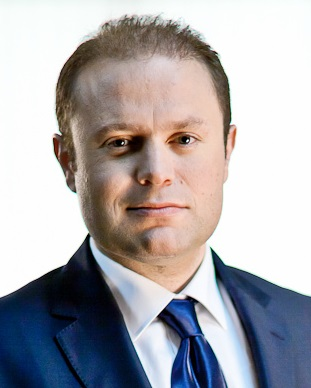
Prime Minister of Malta, Joseph Muscat

The Maltese Government 2013–2017 was the Government of Malta from 11 March 2013 till 1 May 2017. The Maltese government is elected through a General Election for a five-year term (projected dissolution was 10 March 2018). The Head of Government was Joseph Muscat. On 1 May 2017, whilst speaking during a Labour Party mass meeting, Prime Minister Joseph Muscat announced a snap general election for 3 June 2017, a year before the end of his term.

== Cabinet ==
| Portfolio | Minister | Took office | Left office | Party |
|---|---|---|---|---|
| Prime Minister | Joseph Muscat | 11 March 2013 | 1 May 2017 | Labour |
| Deputy Prime Minister & Minister of European Affairs | Louis Grech | 13 March 2013 | 1 May 2017 | Labour |
| Minister for the Economy, Investment and Small Business | Christian Cardona | 13 March 2013 | 1 May 2017 | Labour |
| Minister for Education and Employment | Evarist Bartolo | 13 March 2013 | 1 May 2017 | Labour |
| Minister within the Office of the Prime Minister | Konrad Mizzi | 28 April 2016 | 1 May 2017 | Labour |
| Minister for Energy and Health | Konrad Mizzi | 29 March 2014 | 28 April 2016 | Labour |
| Minister for Energy and Water Conservation | Konrad Mizzi | 13 March 2013 | 29 March 2014 | Labour |
| Minister for Health | Godfrey Farrugia | 13 March 2013 | 29 March 2014 | Labour |
| Minister for Health | Chris Fearne | 28 April 2016 | 1 May 2017 | Labour |
| Minister for Environment, Sustainable Development, and Climate Change | Leo Brincat | 13 March 2013 | 28 April 2016 | Labour |
| Minister for Environment, Sustainable Development, and Climate Change | José Herrera | 28 April 2016 | 1 May 2017 | Labour |
| Minister for Family and Social Solidarity | Marie Louise Coleiro Preca | 13 March 2013 | 29 March 2014 | Labour |
| Minister for Family and Social Solidarity | Michael Farrugia | 29 March 2014 | 1 May 2017 | Labour |
| Minister for Finance | Edward Scicluna | 13 March 2013 | 1 May 2017 | Labour |
| Minister for Foreign Affairs | George Vella | 13 March 2013 | 1 May 2017 | Labour |
| Minister for Gozo | Anton Refalo | 13 March 2013 | 1 May 2017 | Labour |
| Minister for Competitiveness and Digital, Maritime and Services Economy | Manuel Mallia | 28 April 2016 | 1 May 2017 | Labour |
| Minister for Home Affairs and National Security | Manuel Mallia | 13 March 2013 | 9 December 2014 | Labour |
| Minister for Home Affairs and National Security | Carmelo Abela | 9 December 2014 | 1 May 2017 | Labour |
| Minister for Justice, Culture and Local Government | Owen Bonnici | 29 March 2014 | 1 May 2017 | Labour |
| Minister for Social Dialogue, Consumer Affairs and Civil Liberties | Helena Dalli | 13 March 2013 | 1 May 2017 | Labour |
| Minister for Tourism | Karmenu Vella | 13 March 2013 | 29 March 2014 | Labour |
| Minister for Tourism | Edward Zammit Lewis | 29 March 2014 | 1 May 2017 | Labour |
| Minister for Transport and Infrastructure | Joe Mizzi | 13 March 2013 | 1 May 2017 | Labour |

== See also ==
- List of Maltese governments
- Maltese Government 2008–2013
