= Edward Scicluna =

Maltese economist and politician (born 1946)

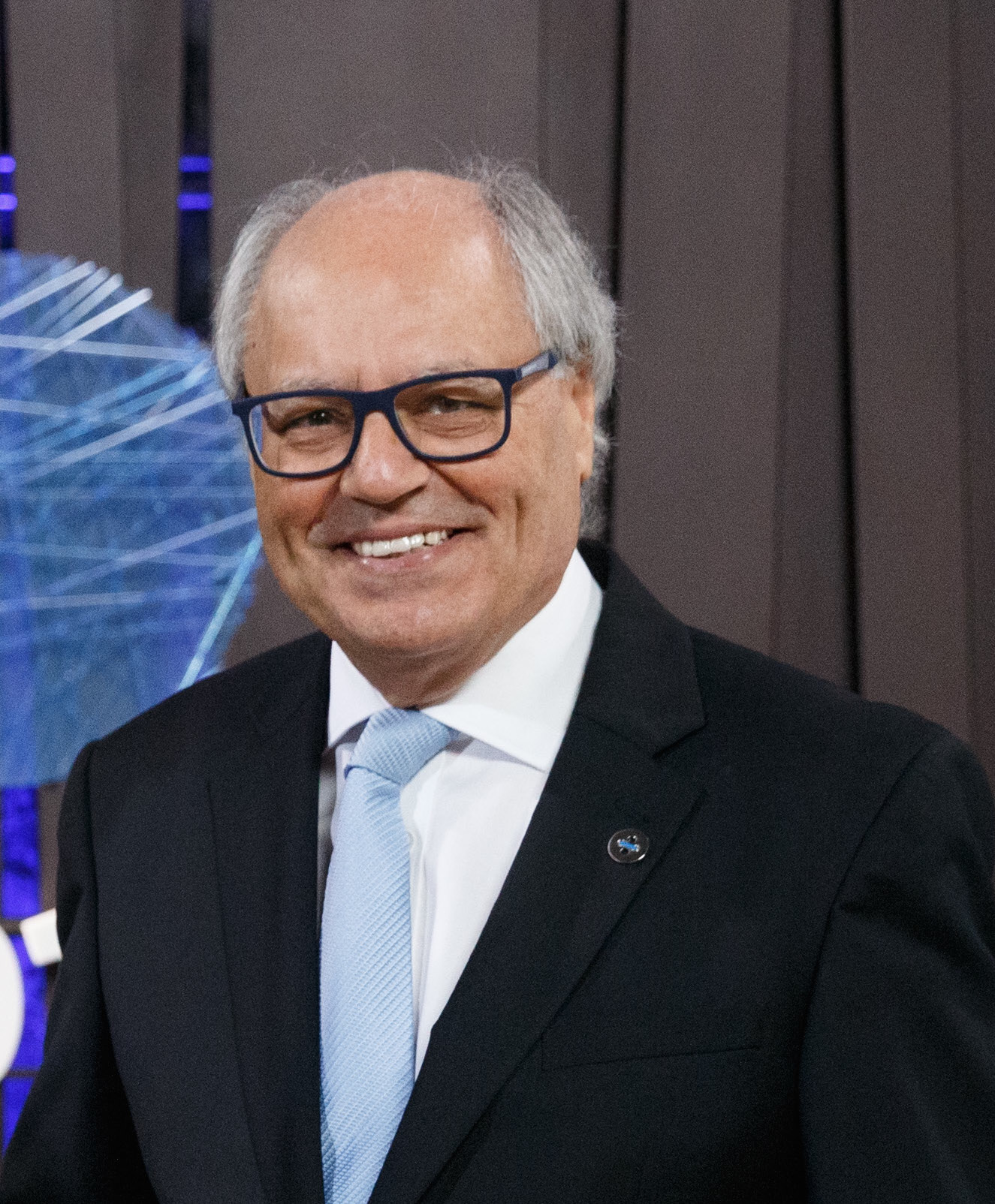

Governor of the Central Bank of Malta
- In office 1 January 2021 – 31 December 2025
- Prime Minister: Robert Abela
- Preceded by: Mario Vella
- Succeeded by: Alexander Demarco

Minister of Finance
- In office 13 March 2013 – 22 November 2020
- Prime Minister: Joseph Muscat; Robert Abela
- Preceded by: Tonio Fenech
- Succeeded by: Clyde Caruana

Personal details
- Born: 12 October 1946 (age 80) Rabat, Malta
- Party: Labour Party
- Spouse: Astrid Bartoli
- Children: Mark; Katya
- Education: Plater College; University of Malta; University of Toronto
- Website: edwardscicluna.com

Edward Scicluna (born October 12, 1946 in Rabat, Malta) is a Maltese economist.

== Biography ==
=== Education and private life ===
Scicluna holds a diploma in social studies from the Plater College, Oxford (1972) and degrees in economics from the University of Malta (BA, 1975) and the University of Toronto (MA, 1976, and PhD, 1982). Between 1981 and 1990 he was professor and head of the Department of Economics at the University of Malta where he still holds a lectureship post.

Scicluna is married with two children.

=== Professional career ===
Scicluna has held a number of posts in the public and private sector. He served as chairman of the Malta Council of Economic and Social Development (MCESD) (1999–2003) and of the Malta Financial Services Authority (MFSA) (1997–99), an Electoral Commissioner (1987–93), a Director of the Central Bank of Malta (1996–2003) and a member of Malta's National Euro Changeover Committee (NECC) (2005–2008). He was often selected by the Malta Broadcasting Authority to chair broadcast political debates. In the private sector he was Chairman of the HSBC Malta Bond Fund (since 2002) and of CWG plc and director of MIB Ltd.

Internationally he served on the Council of Europe's Development Bank Auditing Committee (1997–2000) and carried out consultancy and advisory work for the European Commission (particularly on the single currency), UNESCO, the United Nations Environment Programme (UNEP) (1987–97), the IMF delegation, the governments of Albania, Croatia, Libya and Turkey and a number of credit rating agencies.

- European Stability Mechanism (ESM), Member of the Board of Governors
- Asian Infrastructure Investment Bank (AIIB), Ex-Officio Member of the Board of Governors
- International Monetary Fund (IMF), Ex-Officio Member of the Board of Governors

=== Political career ===
==== Member of the European Parliament, 2009–2013 ====
Scicluna joined the Labour Party in 2009 and was elected MEP at the 2009 European Parliament election in Malta. He was appointed vice-chairman of the Committee on Economic and Monetary Affairs, member of the delegation to the ACP–EU Joint Parliamentary Assembly and substitute member on the Committee on the Environment, Public Health and Food Safety and the delegation for relations with the countries of Southeast Asia and the Association of Southeast Asian Nations (ASEAN).

==== Minister of Finance, 2013–2020 ====
Scicluna was then elected MP for the Labour Party at the 2013 Maltese general election. On 13 March 2013 he was appointed Finance Minister in the new Labour government of PM Joseph Muscat.

Scicluna, along with then-Health Minister Konrad Mizzi, Former Prime Minister Joseph Muscat and former Chief of Staff Keith Schembri, is the subject of a Criminal Court Case over the deal with Vitals Global Healthcare.

==== Governor of Malta's Central Bank ====
Scicluna assumed the position of Governor of the Central Bank of Malta as from 1 January 2021 for a five-year term till 31 December 2025. In 2024, Scicluna was charged with fraud and misappropriation related to a 2015 deal that saw the management of three hospitals transferred to private firm Vitals Global Healthcare. After various calls to resign, a mutual agreement was reached between the Cabinet and Scicluna to temporarily step aside, whilst retaining his salary.

Political offices
Preceded by Tonio Fenech	Minister of Finance; 2013–2020	Succeeded by Clyde Caruana
