= Tonio Fenech =

Maltese former politician

Ministry for Finance, the Economy and Investment
- In office 11 March 2008 – 10 March 2013
- Prime Minister: Lawrence Gonzi
- Preceded by: Lawrence Gonzi
- Succeeded by: Edward Scicluna

Member of Parliament
- In office 25 May 2003 – 1 May 2017
- Constituency: Eight District

Mayor of Birkirkara
- In office October 1998 – April 2003
- Preceded by: Michael Asciak
- Succeeded by: Doris Borg

Personal details
- Born: 5 May 1969 (age 57)
- Party: Partit Nazzjonalista
- Spouse(s): Claudine Ellul; 2 children
- Education: University of Malta
- Occupation: Politician; accountant; auditor

Tonio Fenech (born 5 May 1969) is a Maltese politician and accountant who served in the government of Malta as Minister of Finance, Economy and Investment from March 2008 to March 2013, and was a member of the Parliament of Malta from 2003 to 2017.

== Biography ==
Fenech graduated in accountancy at the University of Malta in 1992. He is a warranted accountant and auditor.

He joined Price Waterhouse in July 1993 as an auditor, later moving on to the management consultancy practice,

Convinced by former PN leader Eddie Fenech Adami to get involved in politics, Fenech was elected as a Birkirkara local councillor for the Nationalist Party in March 1997. Following the 1998 election, Fenech was appointed Mayor of Birkirkara. Fenech contested the local council elections three times. Among his political appointments, Fenech was also a member of the Housing Authority Board from 1998 to 2003, and member of the e-Malta Commission from 2001 to 2003.

At the 2003 Maltese general election Fenech was elected Member of Parliament for the 8th electoral District, and was subsequently appointed as observer to the European Parliament between May 2003 and March 2004. Fenech was appointed Parliamentary Secretary in the Ministry of Finance by Prime Minister Lawrence Gonzi on 27 March 2004. While at the Ministry of Finance, Fenech worked on Malta's convergence with the Maastricht criteria for accession to the eurozone. Fenech was also given responsibility for the termination of works at Mater Dei Hospital.

Following the 2008 election, Fenech was appointed as Minister of Finance, Economy and Investment in Lawrence Gonzi's cabinet. Fenech was responsible for managing Malta's economy throughout the international economic and financial crisis. Despite these challenges, Malta's economy continued to register growth, while the jobless rate remained among the lowest in the European Union. Fenech was also responsible for reforms, including the privatisation of Malta Dockyard and the restructuring of Air Malta. Fenech did not contest the 2017 Maltese general elections, deciding to leave politics, after 20 years, at 48 years of age. He has since worked in the private sector.

In October 2017, Fenech was reprimanded by the Malta Financial Services Authority for negligence in his role as director of Falcon Funds, an investment fund which lost millions in Swedish pensioners' savings. Fenech was prohibited from taking on new appointments in financial services for two years.

In June 2018, Fenech has been found guilty in a libel suit which was filed against him by Dr Martin Fenech, Joseph Cordina and Charles Scerri for allegations he made against them prior to the 2013 election. The Court, presided over by Magistrate Francesco Depasquale, found that the comments made by Tonio Fenech, which were broadcast on NET TV were libelous and defamatory. The former Minister was ordered to pay €3,000 each to Mr Scerri and to Dr Fenech and another €1,500 to Mr Cordina.

Political offices
Preceded by Lawrence Gonzi	Minister of Finance; 2008–2013	Succeeded by Edward Scicluna
