= Lino (Carmel) Gauci Borda =

Maltese politician (died 2019)

Lino (Carmel) Gauci Borda (1936 – 13 February 2019) was a Maltese doctor and politician from the Nationalist Party. He served in the Parliament of Malta between 1976 and 1994.

His nephew Carmelo Mifsud Bonnici is also an MP.
