= Michael Gonzi =

Maltese medical doctor and retired politician

Member of Parliament
- In office 24 May 2003 – 1 May 2017

Mayor of San Pawl il-Baħar
- In office 1993–1996
- Succeeded by: Paul Bugeja

Personal details
- Born: October 23, 1960 (age 65) Sliema, Malta
- Party: Partit Nazzjonalista
- Children: 2
- Relatives: Lawrence Gonzi (brother); Mikiel Gonzi (great-uncle)

Michael Gonzi (born 23 October 1960) is a Maltese medical doctor and a retired politician.

== Political career ==
He was elected to the House of Representatives of Malta in the 2008 Maltese general election and again in the 2013 Maltese general election representing the 12th district. He was previously a member of the Parliamentary Assembly of the Council of Europe from 2003 to 2004.

=== Party affiliation ===
He is a member of the Partit Nazzjonalista.

== Family background ==
He is the younger brother of former Prime Minister Lawrence Gonzi and a grandnephew of late Archbishop of the Diocese of Malta Mikiel Gonzi.

== See also ==
- Politics of Malta
- Lawrence Gonzi#Family and early life
