= Joe Cassar =

Maltese politician

Minister for Health, The Elderly and Community Care
- In office 9 February 2010 – 10 March 2013

Parliamentary Secretary for Health
- In office 12 March 2008 – 9 February 2010

Personal details
- Born: Joseph Cassar; 19 May 1966 (age 60) Malta
- Party: Partit Nazzjonalista
- Spouse: Anna Maria Cassar
- Children: 2

Joseph Cassar (born 19 May 1966), best known as Joe Cassar, was a Maltese politician who served as Minister for Health, The Elderly and Community Care. He was a Nationalist Member of Parliament until he resigned in November 2015, both from the Nationalist Party and Parliament.

== Education ==
His education started at St. Aloysius College, after which he progressed to the University of Malta. He graduated as a medical doctor in 1990. His post graduate specialisation was in psychiatry at Yale University (USA) which was followed by working as a consultant psychiatrist within the Department of Health.

== Medical career ==
During his professional career, Cassar was President of the Malta Medical Students Association, an executive member within the Medical Association of Malta, the President of Yale Psychiatry Residents Association and an active member of the International Catholic Movement. He has authored numerous papers related to psychiatry.

== Political career ==
He represented the Nationalist Party in the Medical Board for the Maltese Electoral Commission. He contested the 2008 elections in the interest of the Nationalist Party getting elected to the House of Representatives of Malta. Prime Minister Lawrence Gonzi appointed his as Parliamentary Secretary of Health in the Ministry of Social Policy, assisting Minister John Dalli.
