= Carmelo Mifsud Bonnici =

Maltese politician

Minister for Justice and Home Affairs
- In office 13 March 2008 – 30 May 2012
- Prime Minister: Lawrence Gonzi
- Preceded by: Tonio Borg
- Succeeded by: Lawrence Gonzi; Chris Said

Parliamentary Secretary for Justice and Home Affairs
- In office 13 April 2003 – 13 March 2008
- Prime Minister: Eddie Fenech Adami; Lawrence Gonzi
- Preceded by: Office established
- Succeeded by: Owen Bonnici (March 2013)

Member of Parliament
- Incumbent
- Assumed office 5 September 1998

Personal details
- Born: 17 February 1960 (age 66) Floriana, Malta
- Party: Partit Nazzjonalista
- Spouse(s): Alexandra (née Gatt); three children
- Relations: Lino (Carmel) Gauci Borda (uncle)

Carmelo "Carm" Mifsud Bonnici (born 17 February 1960) is a Maltese politician who has served in a number of Ministerial posts in the Government of Malta.

== Background, education and family ==
Carmelo Mifsud Bonnici, the son of former President Ugo Mifsud Bonnici, was born in Floriana on 17 February 1960. He was educated at St. Aloysius' College, Birkirkara, then at De La Salle College in Cospicua. Bonnici is a distant relative of former Labour Prime Minister Karmenu Mifsud Bonnici.

During his student days, Mifsud Bonnici occupied the post of President of the MKSU as a university student and was active in the Nationalist Party Youth Movement (MŻPN) as from 1982, occupying different posts in the executive of the said movement. He graduated from the University of Malta in 1984 as Doctor of Laws.

When graduating, as a lawyer, he practiced in criminal, civil and commercial fields.

At present, he is a senior lecturer in Roman Law at the University of Malta.

== Family ==
He is married to Sandra (née Gatt); the couple has three children.

== Early political career ==
Mifsud Bonnici was elected to the House of Representatives in 1998 as a member of the Nationalist Party. He was appointed by parliament as the Chairman of Committees in the same year and was a permanent member of a number of other committees. Between October 2001 and March 2003 he served as a board member of the Malta Environment and Planning Authority, being re-elected to the House of Representatives in 2003.

== Cabinet appointments ==
In April 2003, Carm Mifsud Bonnici was appointed Parliamentary Secretary in the Ministry for Justice and Home Affairs. Following the swearing-in of Lawrence Gonzi as Prime Minister and the subsequent Cabinet reshuffle in March 2004, he was re-confirmed as Parliamentary Secretary in the Ministry for Justice and Home Affairs. During this period he drove the implementation of several reforms and introduction of new concepts in the Maltese judicial system.

After the March 2008 general election, Mifsud Bonnici was appointed Minister for Justice and Home Affairs. His portfolio includes the responsibility for the Courts of Justice, the Attorney General's Office, the Police Corps, Immigration, Airport Security, Correctional Services, Civil Protection and Data Protection. In February 2009, Mifsud Bonnici unveiled the White Paper on Restorative Justice which is intended to serve as a basis for public discussion for a deep reform in Malta's penal system. It proposes the introduction of a number of new concepts, including parole, which is as yet unavailable in Malta. In January 2012 he was made Minister for Home and Parliamentary Affairs which included the role of Leader of the House of Representatives.

However, he resigned as Minister the following 30 May after an Opposition motion of no confidence in him was carried, which was supported by all Labour-Parliamentarians along with Nationalist Franco Debono.

== Literary works ==
Carm Mifsud Bonnici is the author of four publications: Żewg Minuti Flimkien (1998), Il-Prinċipji Hemm Jibqgħu (2003), Sens u Sustanza (2008) and Il-Politika tas-Sewwa (2013). He also writes weekly columns for the Sunday papers Il-Mument and Illum.
