= Dolores Cristina =

Maltese politician (born 1949)

Minister for Education and Employment
- In office 6 January 2012 – 10 March 2013

Minister for Education, Employment and Family
- In office 9 February 2010 – 6 January 2012

Minister for Education and Culture
- In office 11 March 2008 – 9 February 2010
- Preceded by: Louis Galea

Minister for the Family and Social Solidarity
- In office 2004 – 11 March 2008

Personal details
- Born: 10 January 1949 (age 77) Senglea
- Party: Partit Nazzjonalista
- Spouse: Victor Cristina
- Children: Liliana; Marilena; Alessandro; Anthony

Dolores Cristina (born 10 January 1949) is a former Maltese politician who served in a number of ministerial positions under a number of Nationalist Governments.

== Early life and education ==
Cristina was born in Senglea. She graduated from the Royal University of Malta with a Bachelor of Arts (Hons.) degree in 1971 and held teaching posts in history and English at secondary and post-secondary levels.

== Political career ==
Cristina, a member of the Nationalist Party, stood as a candidate in the 1996 general election. She briefly became Mayor of Swieqi in April 1998 before being elected to Parliament from the 10th District in the September 1998 general election.

Cristina was re-elected to Parliament from the 9th District in the April 2003 general election. Subsequently, she was appointed as Parliamentary Secretary within the Ministry of Social Policy, with a special focus on Social Housing and Gender Equality. She was later appointed as Minister for the Family and Social Solidarity in a cabinet reshuffle on 23 March 2004, with a portfolio including Social Policy, Family Policy, Child Policy, Solidarity Services, Social Security, Social Housing and Equality.

After the Nationalist victory in the March 2008 general election, Cristina was appointed as Minister for Education and Culture, replacing the unelected former minister Louis Galea.

Dolores Cristina was Acting President of Malta from March 2013 to June 2022. She first assumed this role in absence of the president of Malta, H.E. Dr. George Abela, when the latter led a delegation to the Vatican City, to assist to the papal inauguration of Pope Francis.

On 13 December 2022, at the traditional Republic Day ceremony, Dolores Cristina became the first woman to be appointed Companion of the National Order of Merit, Malta's highest honour.
