= Austin Gatt =

Maltese politician

Minister for Infrastructure, Transport and Communications
- In office 11 March 2008 – 10 March 2013
- Prime Minister: Lawrence Gonzi
- Preceded by: Jesmond Mugliett
- Succeeded by: Joe Mizzi

Minister for Information, Technology and Investment
- In office 12 April 2003 – 11 March 2008
- Prime Minister: Eddie Fenech Adami; Lawrence Gonzi

Minister for Justice and Local Government
- In office March 1999 – April 2003
- President: Ugo Mifsud Bonnici; Guido de Marco

Parliamentary Secretary
- In office September 1998 – March 1999
- President: Ugo Mifsud Bonnici

Personal details
- Born: Agostino Pio Gatt; 29 July 1953 (age 73) Floriana, Malta
- Party: PN
- Spouse: Marisa (née Zammit Maempel)
- Children: Gege Gatt, Paul Gatt

Agostino Pio "Austin" Gatt (born 29 July 1953) is a Maltese former politician, who served in a number of ministerial posts.

== Early life ==
Austin Gatt received his education at the Lyceum and the University of Malta. He read Law and graduated as a Doctor of Laws in 1975. He practiced law as a partner with one of the oldest law firms on the island.

== Politics ==
Gatt joined the Nationalist Party Electoral Office in 1976. In 1980 the Nationalist Party entrusted Gatt, with building a party organization to eliminate the possibility of electoral fraud in the 1981 general elections’, this problem having been prevalent in the previous General elections. In 1981 elections the Nationalist Party polled 51% of the votes.

Gatt's contribution to the Nationalist Party continued when he was appointed Chairman of the Management Board of Independence Print Company Limited. The company incorporated all the commercial activities of the Nationalist Party. Gatt was also the head of the Legal Office of the Party, representing the party in a number of constitutional cases. In 1987 he again led the organization of the Party to monitor electoral fraud and eventually became Chairman of the Board of Directors of Independence Company Limited and Euro Tours Company Limited.

=== Secretary General of the Nationalist Party ===
After the Nationalist Party was elected to Government in 1987, Gatt was elected Secretary General of the Party on 5 February 1988. This meant that Gatt became responsible for the overall organization of the Party and for the implementation of policies approved by the Executive Committee and the Administrative Council of the Party. Gatt spearheaded a complete reorganization of the Party’s political, administrative and commercial structures and was responsible for preparing and ensuring the implementation of all plans for the General Elections of 1992 and 1996.

=== Shadow Minister for Justice, Local Councils and Housing (1996-1998) ===
Gatt contested the general elections for the first time in 1996 and was elected from the First District. Between 1996 and 1998 he was Party spokesman for Justice, Local Councils and Housing and was entrusted by the Nationalist Party to set up the Party’s television station.

=== Minister for Justice and Local Government (1998-2003) ===
Following the Nationalist Party victory at the General Elections of September 1998, Gatt was appointed Parliamentary Secretary in the Office of the Prime Minister, and six months later, Minister for Justice and Local Government.

Gatt, embarked on various ambitious tasks in all areas within his portfolio. Amongst these there are the creation of an information economy and society in Malta, the introduction of e-Government, a major administrative reform in the law courts, and the transformation of Local Government Authorities.

=== Minister for IT and Investment (2003-2008) ===
Gatt was re-elected to Parliament in 2003, from the First District. He was appointed a Minister for IT & Investment, responsible for the creation of the Information Society and Economy, ICT in Government, AirMalta plc, Gozo Channel Co. Ltd, Sea Malta Co. Ltd., Maltacom plc, Malta International Airport plc, Enemalta Corporation, Water Services Corporation, Malta Freeport Corporation, Public Broadcasting Services Limited, Malta Drydocks Corporation and Malta Investment Management Co. Ltd. In March 2004, following a cabinet reshuffle, Dr Gatt was once again entrusted with the portfolio of Minister for Information Technology and Investment with Industry being added to his portfolio in 2004 after the resignation of John Dalli from Cabinet.

=== Minister for Infrastructure, Communications and Transport (2008-2013) ===
After the March 2008 general election, Gatt was appointed Minister for Communications and National Projects with responsibility for IT, the Water Services Corporation and Enemalta, Malta Shipyards and the roads on March 12, 2008.On 14 April 2008, the government announced that the name of the Ministry for Communications and National Projects was changed to the Ministry for Infrastructure, Transport and Communications (MITC). Following the Cabinet mini-reshuffle on 9 February 2010, Water Services Corporation and Enemalta portfolios were withdrawn from the Ministry and given to the Ministry of Finance, the Economy and Investment.
