= Tonio Borg =

Maltese politician

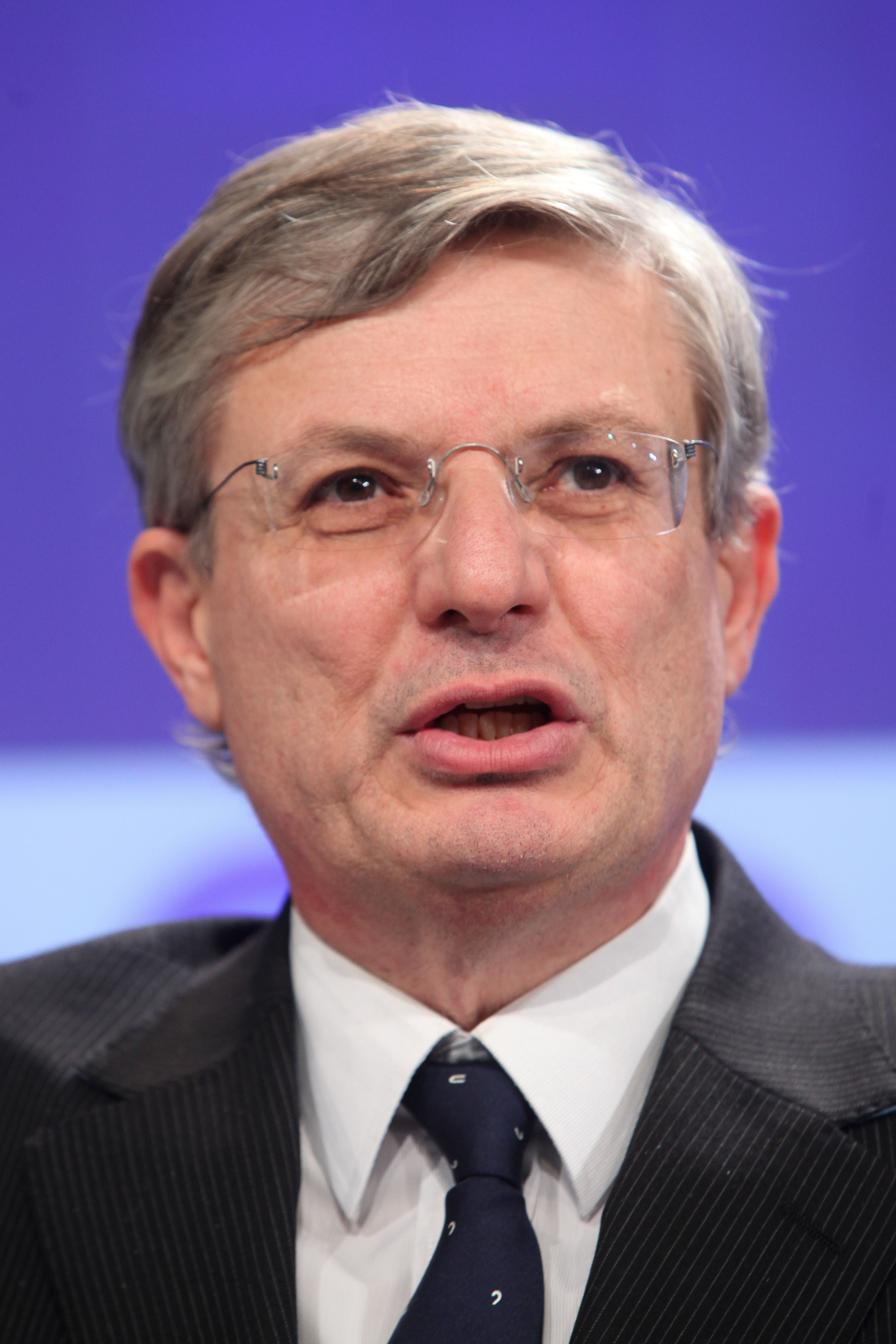
- Tonio Borg in 2012

European Commissioner for Health
- In office 1 July 2013 – 1 November 2014
- President: José Manuel Barroso
- Preceded by: Himself (Health and Consumer Policy)
- Succeeded by: Vytenis Andriukaitis (Health and Food Safety)

European Commissioner for Health and Consumer Policy
- In office 28 November 2012 – 1 July 2013
- President: José Manuel Barroso
- Preceded by: Maroš Šefčovič (Acting)
- Succeeded by: Himself (Health); Neven Mimica (Consumer Protection)

Deputy Prime Minister of Malta
- In office 23 March 2004 – 28 November 2012
- Prime Minister: Lawrence Gonzi
- Preceded by: Lawrence Gonzi
- Succeeded by: Louis Grech

Minister of Foreign Affairs
- In office 12 March 2008 – 28 November 2012
- Prime Minister: Lawrence Gonzi
- Preceded by: Michael Frendo
- Succeeded by: Francis Zammit Dimech

Minister of Justice
- In office 15 April 2003 – 12 March 2008
- Prime Minister: Eddie Fenech Adami; Lawrence Gonzi
- Preceded by: Austin Gatt
- Succeeded by: Carmelo Mifsud Bonnici

Minister of Home Affairs
- In office 8 September 1998 – 12 March 2008
- Prime Minister: Eddie Fenech Adami; Lawrence Gonzi
- Preceded by: Alfred Sant
- Succeeded by: Carmelo Mifsud Bonnici
- In office 17 April 1995 – 28 October 1996
- Prime Minister: Eddie Fenech Adami
- Preceded by: Louis Galea
- Succeeded by: Alfred Sant

Personal details
- Born: 12 May 1957 (age 69) Floriana, Malta
- Party: Nationalist Party
- Spouse: Adele Galea
- Children: 3
- Education: University of Malta

Tonio Borg (born 12 May 1957) is a Maltese lawyer, law professor, and former politician who served as the European Commissioner for Health and Consumer Policy replacing John Dalli as member of the College of the European Commission in the second Barroso Commission. He lectures Public Law at the University of Malta, and has authored numerous books on the subject.

== Political career ==
Borg was first elected in 1992, serving as Minister for Home Affairs. After the Nationalist Party lost the 1996 election, he became a shadow minister to the Alfred Sant administration. Eventually, the Nationalist Party would retake the government in 1998, wherein Borg assumed the role of Minister of Home Affairs until parliament was dissolved in 2003, in preparation for Malta's EU ascension, which Borg's Nationalist Party was in favour of. After the 2003 general election, Borg was elected, and resumed as Minister of Justice and Home Affairs. In 2004, he was sworn as Deputy Prime Minister.

In the 2008 general election, the Nationalist Party returned to government, albeit with a slim majority. Tonio Borg was made Minister of Foreign Affairs.

In 2012, Borg was appointed as EU Health (and Consumer Policy) Commissioner, replacing John Dalli. EU ministers majorly approved Tonio Borg's candidature, yet his conservative views on gay rights and abortion were subject to criticism from several MEPs.

Disagreeing with the idea of a 'potential human being', Borg sought to entrench Malta's restriction of abortion in the Constitution. Whilst the proposition received support from some Labour Party MP's, most notably Marie-Louise Coleiro Preca, it was dismissed by moderate politicians in the Nationalist Party and the Labour Party.

Initial controversy surrounding his election as Health Commissioner centered around perceived conflicts with his portfolio, wherein Borg, a Catholic conservative-leaning Christian Democrat, would oversee matters of stem-cell research, IVF, and other topics which are criticized under Catholic social teaching, threatening the role's impartiality. Nevertheless, Borg maintained an impartial and moderate presence. The post of Maltese commissioner was succeeded by Karmenu Vella in 2014.

== Academia ==
Graduating with a law degree in 1979, he would start lecturing at the University of Malta initially as a guest lecturer. Eventually, in 2016, he became an assistant lecturer, until 2018 wherein he completed his PhD in Judicial Review and Administrative Law, and was promoted to senior lecturer.

He became associate professor in March 2020. In 2024 he was promoted to full professor. He lectures Constitutional, and Administrative law.

His PhD thesis was published as a book in 2020. In it, Borg observes the field of Administrative law in Malta, highlighting potential abuses of power and the manner in which Maltese courts apply the ultra vires doctrine.

== Other activities ==
- European Medicines Agency (EMA), Member of the Management Board

== Recognition ==
In December 2018 Borg was appointed Companion of the Order of Merit (KOM) by the President of Malta.

== Publications ==
- Borg, Tonio (1979). Public limits to fundamental human rights: a study of Maltese decisions. (Master's dissertation).
- Borg, Tonio (2016) A Commentary On The Constitution Of Malta. Kite Group. Kite Group. ISBN 9789995750282
- Borg, Tonio (2019) Leading cases in Maltese constitutional law. Kite Group. ISBN 9789995750824
- Borg, Tonio (2021) Maltese Administrative Law. Kite Group. ISBN 9789918230280
- Borg, Tonio (2020) Leading cases in Maltese administrative law. Kite Group. ISBN 9789918230051
- Borg, Tonio (2022) A Commentary On The Constitution Of Malta (2nd Edition). Kite Group. ISBN 9789918230785
- Borg, Tonio (2022) The Blue sisters saga : a legal and factual analysis. Kite Group. ISBN 9789918230587
- Borg, Tonio et al. (2024) The Constitution of Malta at sixty. Kite Group. ISBN 9789918231478

== Political offices ==
Political offices
Preceded by Louis Galea	Minister of Home Affairs; 1995–1996	Succeeded by Alfred Sant
Preceded by Alfred Sant	Minister of Home Affairs; 1998–2008	Succeeded by Carmelo Mifsud Bonnici
Preceded by Austin Gatt	Minister of Justice; 2003–2008	Succeeded by Carmelo Mifsud Bonnici
Preceded by Lawrence Gonzi	Deputy Prime Minister of Malta; 2004–2012	Succeeded by Simon Busuttil
Preceded by Michael Frendo	Minister of Foreign Affairs; 2008–2012	Succeeded by Francis Zammit Dimech
Preceded by John Dalli	Maltese European Commissioner; 2012–2014	Succeeded by Karmenu Vella
Preceded by Maroš Šefčovič; Acting	European Commissioner for Health and Consumer Policy; 2012–2013	Succeeded by Himself as European Commissioner for Health
Preceded by Maroš Šefčovič; Acting	European Commissioner for Health and Consumer Policy; 2012–2013	Succeeded by Neven Mimica as European Commissioner for Consumer Protection
Preceded by Himself as European Commissioner for Health and Consumer Policy	European Commissioner for Health; 2013–2014	Succeeded by Vytenis Andriukaitis as European Commissioner for Health and Food Safety
Party political offices
Preceded by Lawrence Gonzi	Deputy Leader of the Nationalist Party; 2004–2012	Succeeded by Simon Busuttil
