= Michael Refalo =

Maltese politician and diplomat

Michael Refalo (25 February 1936 – 3 February 2015) was a Maltese politician and diplomat. He was a member of the Nationalist Party and sat in the House of Representatives between 1971 and 2003 and served terms first as parliamentary secretary and later as minister for tourism. Refalo was High Commissioner of Malta to the United Kingdom between 2005 and October 2008. He was also the editor of the Il-Mument newspaper from 1972 to 1980.

== Career ==
Refalo was born in Sliema on 25 February 1936. He went to St Aloysius' College. He became a lawyer in 1961.

In the 1962 and 1966 elections he was a candidate for the House of Representatives of Malta for the Nationalist Party, but was not elected. In the 1971 election he was elected to the house. He was re-elected in every election until 2003, a total of 33 years.

In 1987, he was made parliamentary secretary for tourism and he was reappointed to the function in 1992. During his term in office he made the goal of Malta obtaining one million tourists annually. In 1995, he was made minister for justice and culture and, three years later, he was appointed minister for tourism and culture. He was High Commissioner of Malta to the United Kingdom between 2005 and October 2008.

He was editor of the newspaper Il-Mument between 1972 and 1980.

Refalo was made a companion in the National Order of Merit in 2007. Refalo died on 3 February 2015 in Sliema, aged 78.
