= John Dalli =

Maltese politician

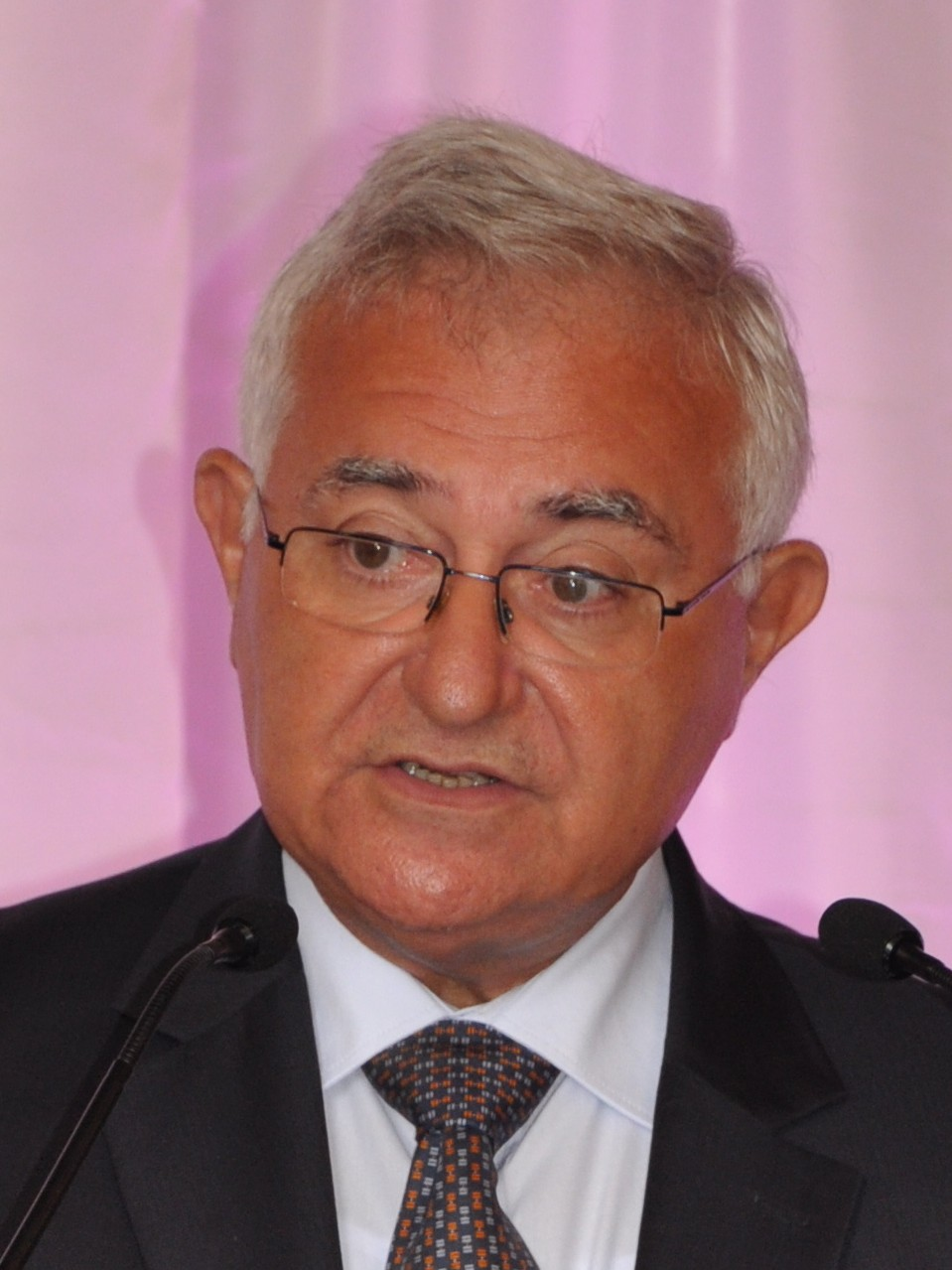
- Dalli in 2011

European Commissioner for Health and Consumer Policy
- In office 9 February 2010 – 16 October 2012
- President: José Manuel Barroso
- Preceded by: Androulla Vassiliou (Health); Meglena Kuneva (Consumer Protection)
- Succeeded by: Maroš Šefčovič (Acting)

Finance Minister of Malta
- In office 27 February 1992 – 29 October 1996
- Prime Minister: Eddie Fenech Adami
- Preceded by: George Bonello Du Puis
- Succeeded by: Lino Spiteri
- In office 8 September 1998 – 23 March 2004
- Prime Minister: Eddie Fenech Adami; Lawrence Gonzi
- Preceded by: Lino Spiteri
- Succeeded by: Lawrence Gonzi

Personal details
- Born: 5 October 1948 (age 77)
- Party: Nationalist Party
- Spouse: Josette Callus
- Children: Claire; Louisa

John Dalli (born 5 October 1948) is a Maltese former politician who served as Cabinet Minister in various Maltese governments between 1987 and 2010. He was European Commissioner for Health and Consumer Policy between 2010 and 2012.

== Maltese politics ==
Dalli was first elected to the House of Representatives of Malta in 1987 on behalf of the Nationalist Party, and since then, he has been re-elected in five successive elections: in 1992, 1996, 1998, 2003, and 2008. He has served as Parliamentary Secretary for Industry (1987–1990), Minister of Economic Affairs (1990–92), Minister of Finance (1992–1996, 1998–2004), and Minister of Foreign Affairs and Investment Promotion (2004). During his tenure at the Ministry of Finance (the longest in Maltese political history), Dalli is best remembered for his modernization of the taxation system through the introduction of VAT in 1994 and again in 1998.

He is credited with the creation of the financial services centre.

In February 2004, Dalli contested the election for the leadership of the Nationalist Party but lost to Lawrence Gonzi, who was appointed prime minister. In the new cabinet, Dalli was appointed Minister of Foreign Affairs and Investment Promotion. However, he resigned after serving for three months from April to July 2004 following allegations of corruption in the awarding of contracts for medical equipment and airline ticketing.

Dalli remained a backbench MP and was outspoken about what was going on within the party. In 2007 the Prime Minister appointed Dalli as a personal consultant.

Dalli was re-elected to the House of Representatives in the March 2008 general election and returned to the cabinet as Minister for Social Policy. His portfolio included health, the elderly, employment and training, housing, and industrial relations. Joe Cassar and Mario Galea were appointed Parliamentary Secretaries for Health and for the Elderly and Community Care respectively to assist him.

In this ministry, Dalli started a reform of the health sector which was interrupted when he resigned as minister and as Member of Parliament on 10 February 2010 on his appointment as European Commissioner.

== European Commissioner ==
Dalli was appointed to the European Commission on 9 February 2010 as Commissioner for Health and Consumer Policy. On 15 October 2012, the European Anti-fraud Office (OLAF) delivered its report to the Commission President on accusations an associate of Dalli had asked for €60 million from Swedish Match, the main producer of Swedish snus, in return for Dalli's help in changing European tobacco regulations. On 16 October 2012, Dalli was forced to resign by Commission President José Manuel Barroso. Dalli has maintained that he did not resign, but in an interview given on the morning of 17 October 2012 with New Europe confirmed Barroso asked him for his resignation, and alleged that the Tobacco lobby was involved in the case.

Dalli has subsequently denied any knowledge of the alleged bribery.

The OLAF report claimed that the decision-making process of the commission services was not jeopardized, that no money changed hands, and that Dalli was not involved in the execution of this action. However, they put forward the conclusion that he knew what was going on. This was stated in the statement issued by the Commission to announce Dalli's dismissal.

Dalli had insisted from the outset that the report by OLAF should be published, but the commission always refused. Finally, this report was leaked by Malta Today on 28 April 2013. Upon its publication, there was a chorus of criticism of this report, which was described by some as amateurish and biased.

On 24 December 2012, Dalli instituted a case in the European Court of Justice against the Commission to annul the decision by Barroso to force his resignation (Case T-562/12). On 7 and 8 July 2014, the ECJ held a public session to hear witnesses in the case, Jose Manuel Barroso, President of the Commission, was called as a witness in the proceedings. On 12 May 2015, the action was dismissed, and Dalli was ordered to pay the costs.

Dalli also instituted a case in the Belgian Criminal Court against Swedish Match for defamation on 13 December 2012. In December 2014, Dalli extended the case to include OLAF as he insists that OLAF abused its powers in the investigation. This case seems to be stalled as the police officer on the case has been changed by the Belgian Authorities.

The OLAF announced on 26 September 2013, that it had begun a new investigation into Dalli.

== Back in Malta ==
Peter Paul Zammit, the police commissioner, appointed on 13 April 2013, reinvestigated the case and Dalli was called again to be interviewed on 21 May 2013. On 8 June 2013, Zammit stated that there was no evidence to arraign Dalli, but that the investigations were continuing. This position was reiterated by Zammit on 27 September 2013.

In the summer of 2016, Giovanni Kessler's European Anti-fraud Office (OLAF) delivered a report on Dalli to Maltese authorities. Former Malta Police Chief John Rizzo has said there was enough evidence against Dalli, and he cannot explain why criminal charges were not brought. In May 2017, the Maltese police said investigations into Dalli were ongoing.

The New York Times has reported that Dalli defrauded investors in South Carolina out of at least $1.5 million.

=== Supervisory Committee Opinion 2/2012 ===
On 4 July 2014, the Supervisory Committee set up to supervise the actions of OLAF during its investigations published its report on the case involving Dalli. They sent the report to Corporate Europe Observatory in answer to a request that the latter NGO had made months before. CEO immediately published the report on its website. This report was sent to the Director General OLAF in December 2012. However, OLAF had been refusing to publish this report. After harsh insistence, the European Parliament was only given a censored copy of the report. Even after its publication, the Director General OLAF refused to publish the document on OLAF's website, as is the usual practice.

The report can be read on http://corporateeurope.org/sites/default/files/2012-02-opinion-supervisory_committee.pdf. It can be seen that it is highly critical of the way that OLAF conducted this investigation and of the way that Kessler conducted himself.

In the ECJ hearing referred to above, Dalli's lawyers claimed that this opinion shows that Dalli's human rights were breached by OLAF and asked for the document to be included in the proceedings. The Court accepted this request over the protests of the lawyers of the Commission.

=== Kessler refuses to give evidence ===
In the case that the Maltese Local authorities instituted against Mr. Silvio Zammit, the prosecution has called Kessler on different occasions to give evidence. Kessler has not presented himself to give witness.

The same applies to employees of Swedish Match and ESTOC who are refusing calls by the Maltese courts to give evidence in the case.

=== Secret Documents from Philip Morris ===
On 7 October 2014, France 2, a French public television station, aired a two-hour report entitled "Tobacco Industry, the Grand Manipulation". In this report, the journalists uncovered documents they acquired from Philip Morris showing that the tobacco lobby had planned a strategy to target Dalli, the European commissioner who was steadfast in his drive to have a harsh tobacco products directive.

== Media adaptations ==
- 2024: "Une affaire de principe", by Antoine Raimbault (basé on José Bové book: Hold-up à Bruxelles, 2014 ISBN 9782707178220) - Portrayed by Maurizio Marchetti

Political offices
Preceded by Joe Borg	Maltese European Commissioner; 2010–2012	Succeeded by Tonio Borg
Preceded by Androulla Vassiliou as European Commissioner for Health	European Commissioner for Health and Consumer Policy; 2010–2012	Succeeded by Maroš Šefčovič; Acting
Preceded by Meglena Kuneva as European Commissioner for Consumer Protection	European Commissioner for Health and Consumer Policy; 2010–2012	Succeeded by Maroš Šefčovič; Acting
