= Francis Zammit Dimech =

Maltese politician (1954–2025)

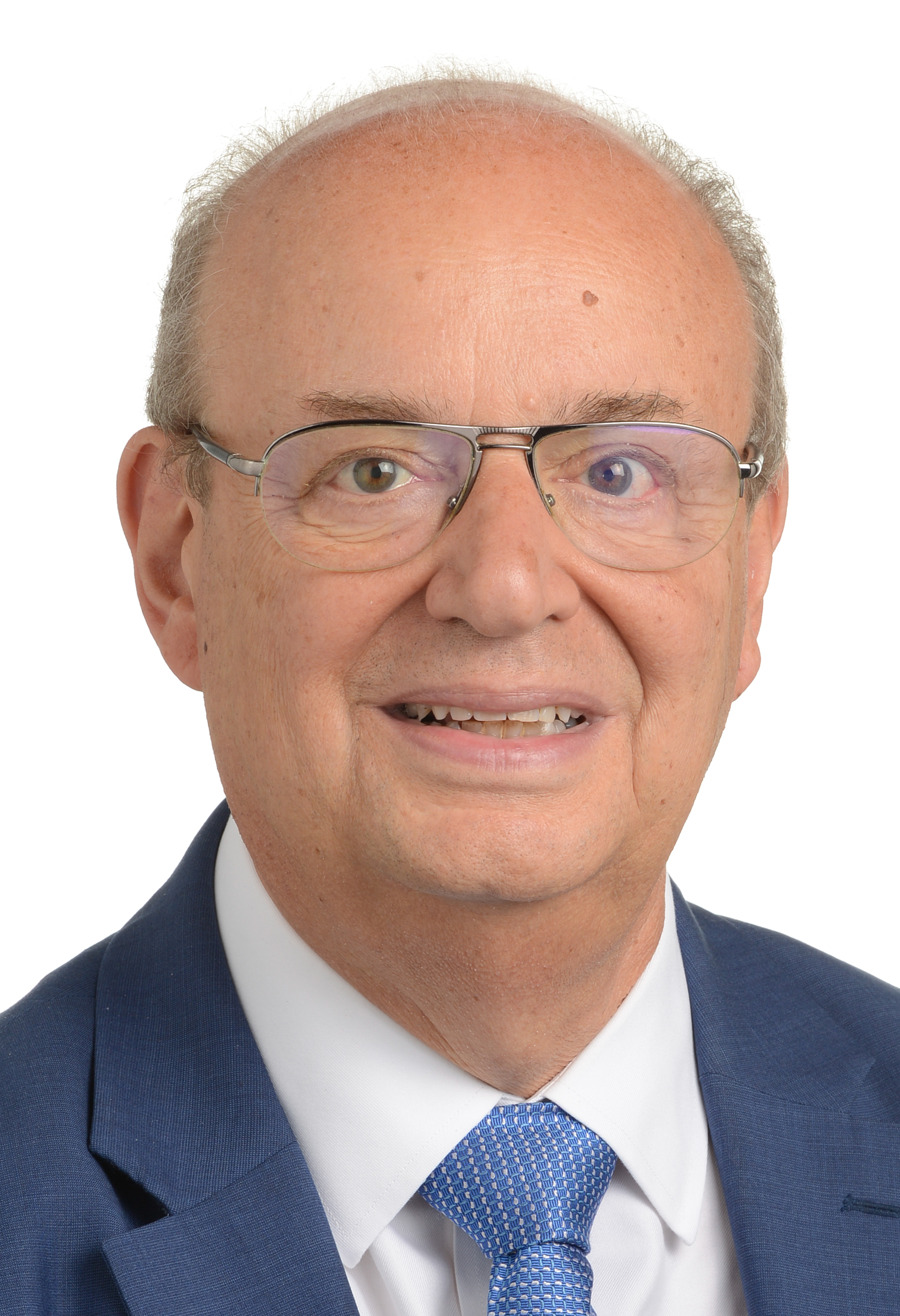

Member of the European Parliament
- In office 24 June 2017 – 25 May 2019
- Preceded by: Therese Comodini Cachia
- Constituency: Malta

Minister for Foreign Affairs of Malta
- In office 28 November 2012 – 13 March 2013
- Prime Minister: Lawrence Gonzi
- Preceded by: Tonio Borg
- Succeeded by: George Vella

Minister for Tourism and Culture
- In office 23 March 2004 – 12 March 2008
- Prime Minister: Lawrence Gonzi

Minister for Tourism
- In office 15 April 2003 – 23 March 2004
- Prime Minister: Eddie Fenech Adami

Minister for Resources and Infrastructure
- In office 2002–2003
- Prime Minister: Eddie Fenech Adami

Minister for the Environment
- In office 1998–2002
- Prime Minister: Eddie Fenech Adami
- In office 1994–1996
- Prime Minister: Eddie Fenech Adami

Minister for Transport and Communications
- In office 1992–1994
- Prime Minister: Eddie Fenech Adami

Parliamentary Secretary for Transport and Communications
- In office 1990–1992
- Prime Minister: Eddie Fenech Adami

Personal details
- Born: 23 October 1954 San Ġiljan, Malta
- Died: 21 April 2025 (aged 70) Msida
- Party: Malta: Nationalist Party; European Union: European People's Party
- Education: University of Malta
- Website: europa.eu; franciszammitdimech.com

Francis Zammit Dimech (23 October 1954 – 21 April 2025) was a Maltese politician who served in domestic Maltese politics as a member of the House of Representatives of Malta between 1987 and 2017 and as a Member of the European Parliament from 2017 till 2019. During his tenure within Maltese politics, Zammit Dimech held office as Minister for Foreign Affairs in the government of Lawrence Gonzi from 28 November 2012, until the defeat of Gonzi's government in the 2013 Maltese general election. He had previously held numerous other ministerial responsibilities including communications, infrastructure, tourism, culture, and environment. Before being appointed Foreign Affairs Minister he served as Chair of the Parliamentary Foreign Affairs Committee. Prior to entering politics, Zammit Dimech worked as a lawyer and broadcaster.

== Education ==
Zammit Dimech attended the University of Malta, where he graduated in Law (LL.D.) in 1979, and attained a master's degree in financial services in 1999. Zammit Dimech later went on to pursue another postgraduate degree in the United Kingdom and graduated in 2013 with an M.B.A. degree from Henley Business School (University of Reading, UK). In 2021, he submitted his thesis for a PhD in Broadcasting Law at the University of Malta.

== Professional career ==
Zammit Dimech was a lawyer by profession specializing in international transactions, trust deeds, financial services, corporate services provision, commercial law, and migration. He was the chairman of the Francis Zammit Dimech Associates law firm from 2009 onwards.

Zammit Dimech was involved in journalistic activities all throughout his life. He served as an editor for many Maltese newspaper and magazine sources; such as the Il-Poplu, and Zaghzugh monthly publications. In 1980, he acted as the parliamentary correspondent for The Times of Malta. Zammit Dimech was until his death a lecturer of European media law, communication and broadcasting at his alma mater (The University of Malta). On the management front, Zammit Dimech lectured regularly at the Henley Business School on Reputation, Responsibility and Corporate Governance.

== Political career ==
Zammit Dimech began his political involvement at a very young age. In 1981, he was selected to be the vice-president of the Democrat Youth Community of Europe (DEMYC), which is the Federation of Christian Democrat and Conservative youth organizations of Europe. In this post, he was responsible to co-ordinate representation of DEMYC on the European Communities Youth Form bodies, and to promote training programmes for youth political leaders and leaders of DEMYC member organizations. Prior to that, Zammit Dimech had served as the president of the student council at the University of Malta.

On the national political front, Zammit Dimech was elected to the Parliament of Malta in 1987 and in all subsequent general elections, until 2017. He held ministerial appointments for sixteen years between 1990 and 2013, including:

- Minister for Transport and Communications
  - Prior to serving as the Minister for Transport and Communications, he was the parliamentary secretary for Transport and Communications
- Minister for the Environment
- Minister for Resources and Infrastructure
- Minister for Tourism and Culture
- Minister for Foreign Affairs

Zammit Dimech's role in the Maltese national government was not limited to his ministerial appointments. Throughout his 30-year stint as member of the Parliament of Malta, Zammit Dimech also served as chairman of the Foreign and European Affairs Committee, in addition to being a member of the Maltese Parliamentary Delegation to the Parliamentary Assembly of the Council of Europe. From 2008 to 2010 he chaired the Legislation Committee in the Maltese national parliament. Prior to the EU accession, Zammit Dimech served as member of the EU-Malta joint Parliamentary Committee.

Zammit Dimech was heavily involved in the Maltese Nationalist Party since serving as the President of the Youth Branch in 1985. Other positions that Mr. Zammit Dimech obtained in the National Party include, information secretary, and president of the Administrative Council. Additionally, he became a member of the Nationalist Party Executive Committee, in 1987.

Zammit Dimech served briefly as a Member of the European Parliament from 2017 till 2019. During this period, Zammit Dimech served as the EPP Group rapporteur on media pluralism and freedom. He served on the following parliamentary committees and delegations:

In April 2024, Zammit Dimech was appointed to serve as the Acting President of Malta in the circumstances prescribed by the Constitution, namely the absence or incapacity of the incumbent President.

== Death ==
Zammit Dimech died from cancer at hospital in Msida on 21 April 2025, at the age of 70.

== Publications ==
- Poll of '76 (Published in 1980)
- The Untruth Game – Broadcasting Under Labour (Published in 1986)
- Eddie – The People's Choice (published in 1987)
