= Ugo Mifsud Bonnici =

President of Malta from 1994 to 1999

His Excellency Ugo Mifsud Bonnici KUOM
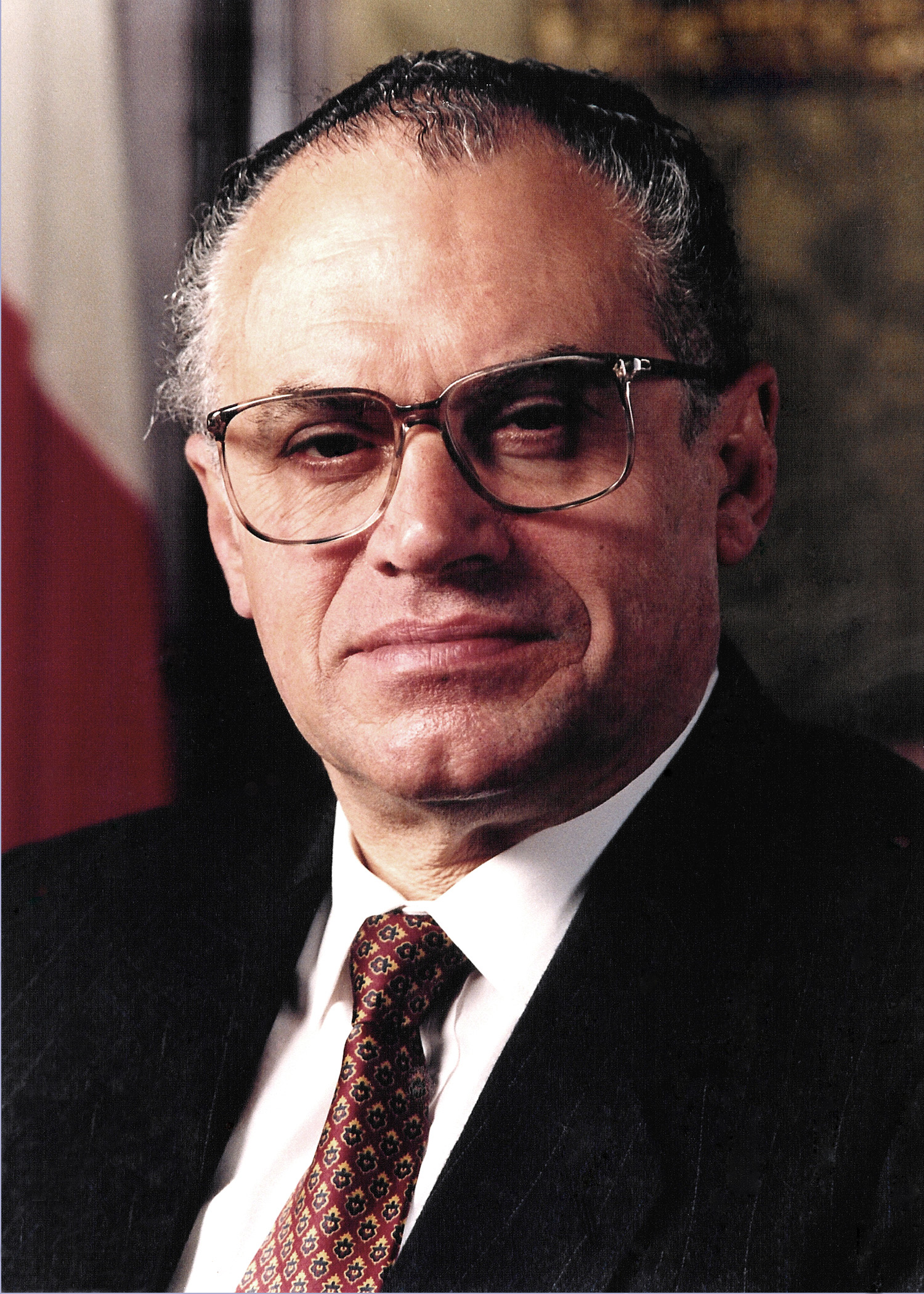

5th President of Malta
- In office 4 April 1994 – 4 April 1999
- Prime Minister: Edward Fenech Adami; Alfred Sant
- Preceded by: Ċensu Tabone
- Succeeded by: Guido de Marco

Personal details
- Born: 8 November 1932 (age 93) Cospicua, British Malta
- Party: Partit Nazzjonalista
- Spouse: Gemma Bianco (1959–present)
- Children: 3
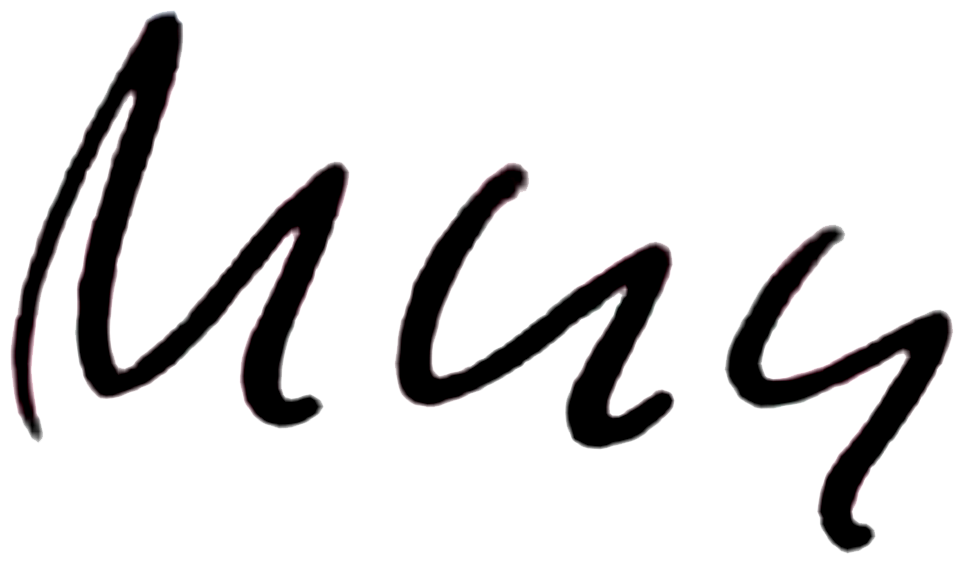
- Signature

Ugo Mifsud Bonnici, KUOM (born 8 November 1932) is a Maltese politician and was the fifth president of Malta from 1994 to 1999.

== Early life, education and family ==
Ugo Mifsud Bonnici was born in Cospicua as the son of Professor Carmelo Mifsud Bonnici, and his wife, Maria (née Ross). He was educated at St Edward's College, Malta, the Lyceum and the Royal University of Malta. He graduated as a Bachelor of Arts in 1952 and as a Doctor of Laws in 1955. As a lawyer, he has practised in all the Law Courts of Malta. On 3 May 1959, he married Gemma (née Bianco); the couple has three childrenː Carmelo, Anton and Jeanne-Pia.

== Entry to politics ==
Following in his father's footsteps, he contested the General Elections in the interests of the Nationalist Party in 1966. He was elected from the 2nd District which comprised Cospicua, Vittoriosa, Senglea, Kalkara and Fgura. He was re-elected in all subsequent General Elections that he contested. For fifteen years (1972–1987) he was the Nationalist Party's spokesman for Education. In 1977 he was also elected President of the Party's General and Administrative Councils.

== Member of the Cabinet ==
In 1987, the Nationalist Party was elected to Government and Bonnici was appointed to the Cabinet as Minister of Education. His portfolio included Education, Environment, Broadcasting, Culture, Youth, Museums and Sport. In 1990, he became Minister of Education and the Interior. Following the 1992 elections, Mifsud Bonnici was appointed Minister of Education and Human Resources.

As a Member of Parliament, he took an active interest in the updating of Malta's legislation. He was a member of numerous Select Committees including the Committee set up to draft the Constitutional changes that declared Malta a Republic. As a Minister, he worked on the drafting of important legislation such as the Education Act, the Environment Act, the National Archives Act and the Occupational Health and Safety Promotion Act. He made a strong effort to improve the standards at public schools.

== Presidency ==
He was inaugurated as President of Malta on 4 April 1994, and served his term in full, ending five years later to the day. He was succeeded by Guido de Marco in 1999.

== Writings ==
Dr. Mifsud Bonnici is a prolific writer. His articles have appeared in various newspapers; some were published in two books: Il-Linja t-Tajba - L-Aħjar Artikli ta' Dottor Ugo Mifsud Bonnici and Biex il-Futur Reġa' Beda. He also spent some years as editor of a literary magazine Malta Letterarja.

== Honours ==
=== National Honours ===
- Malta : Companion of Honour of the National Order of Merit (1994) "by right as a President of Malta"

Political offices
Preceded by Ċensu Tabone	President of Malta; 1994–1999	Succeeded by Guido de Marco
