= Ninu Zammit =

Maltese politician

Minister for Resources and Infrastructure
- In office April 2003 – 10 March 2008
- President: Guido de Marco

Minister for Agriculture and Fisheries
- In office September 1998 – April 2003
- President: Ugo Mifsud Bonnici

Personal details
- Born: 1952; Żurrieq, Malta
- Political party: PN
- Spouse: Margaret née Zahra
- Children: 3

Ninu Zammit (born 1952) is a former Maltese politician, widely known for being suspended from the Nationalist party after an exposé of $3.4 million in his secret Swiss bank account in 2015. He served as a Nationalist MP since 1981, Parliamentary Secretary for Water and Energy (1987–92), Minister of Agriculture (1998–2003) and Minister of Resources and Infrastructure (2003–2008).

== Personal life ==
Zammit was born in Zurrieq in 1952. He received bachelor's degrees from St Aloysius' College and the University of Malta, graduating with degrees in architecture and civil engineering in 1975. He has occupied several different posts in the Nationalist Party of Malta.

== Political life ==
He began his political career as a Member of Parliament, winning his first election in 1981 and serving for five terms thereafter. In 1985, Zammit was appointed Party Spokesman for Water and Energy. Following the General Elections of 1987, he was designated as Parliamentary Secretary for Water and Energy. He was retained for the position in 1992. While serving as the Parliamentary Secretary, Zammit oversaw the development of several new reverse osmosis plants and power stations.

Zammit was appointed Minister for Agriculture and Fisheries in September 1998. In this role, he was responsible for a complete overhaul of the Maltese agricultural sectors, and took part in important trade negotiations with the European Union.

After the elections of 2003, he was appointed Minister for Resources and Infrastructure. Shortly after his confirmation, his portfolio was expanded to include Oil Exploration. His portfolio therefore included responsibility for the Works Division, Environmental Development and Management, Rehabilitation Projects, Malta Resources Authority (MRA), Building Industry Consultative Council (BICC) and Oil Exploration.

Following the March 2008 general election, Zammit lost his post in the Cabinet on March 12, 2008 and became a backbencher in the House of Representatives.
