= Lawrence Gonzi =

Maltese politician (born 1953)

Lawrence Gonzi KUOM
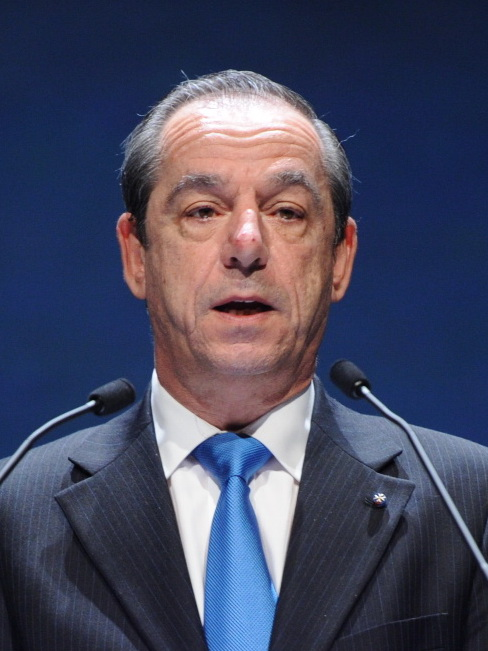
- Gonzi in 2011

12th Prime Minister of Malta
- In office 23 March 2004 – 11 March 2013
- President: Guido de Marco; Edward Fenech Adami; George Abela
- Deputy: Tonio Borg
- Preceded by: Edward Fenech Adami
- Succeeded by: Joseph Muscat

Leader of the Opposition
- In office 6 April 2013 – 18 May 2013
- President: George Abela
- Prime Minister: Joseph Muscat
- Preceded by: Joseph Muscat
- Succeeded by: Simon Busuttil

Leader of the Nationalist Party
- In office 3 March 2004 – 8 May 2013
- Preceded by: Edward Fenech Adami
- Succeeded by: Simon Busuttil
Ministerial offices 1998‍–‍2004
Minister for Finance
In office 23 March 2004 – 11 March 2008
Preceded by	John Dalli
Succeeded by	Tonio Fenech
Deputy Prime Minister of Malta
In office 29 March 1999 – 23 March 2004
Prime Minister	Edward Fenech Adami
Preceded by	Guido de Marco
Succeeded by	Tonio Borg (2008)
Minister for Social Policy
In office 6 September 1998 – 23 March 2004
Prime Minister	Edward Fenech Adami
Preceded by	Edwin Grech
Succeeded by	Dolores Cristina

Speaker of the House of Representatives
- In office 10 October 1988 – 5 December 1996
- Preceded by: Jimmy Farrugia
- Succeeded by: Myriam Spiteri Debono

Member of Parliament
- In office 9 July 1987 – 17 July 2013

Personal details
- Born: 1 July 1953 (age 73) Valletta, British Malta
- Party: Nationalist Party
- Spouse: Catherine Gonzi née Callus
- Children: 3
- Relatives: Michael Gonzi (brother); Mikiel Gonzi (great-uncle)

Lawrence Gonzi KUOM (born 1 July 1953) is a Maltese politician, retired Nationalist politician and lawyer, who served for twenty-five years in various critical roles in Maltese politics. Gonzi was Prime Minister of Malta from 2004 to 2013, and leader of the Nationalist Party. He also served as speaker of the House from 1988 to 1996, and Minister of Social Policy from 1998 to 2004, as well as deputy prime minister from 1999 to 2004. He served in practically all positions in Parliament, being also Leader of the House, an MP and Leader of the Opposition.

Taking over as prime minister from Eddie Fenech Adami, Lawrence Gonzi led the islands through the delicate first years of EU membership. He piloted crucial economic and political reforms, spearheaded Malta's adoption of the euro, and the entry into force of the Schengen agreement. His decision to privatise the Malta shipyards, and the pensions reform, proved to be unpopular. Following a razor-thin electoral victory in 2008, perceptions of arrogance in his cabinet, fomented by the Labour Party opposition and rebel backbenchers, dented his second term of office. Following the loss of a financial vote, his government lost supply in December 2012. The Nationalist party went on to lose the successive general election, leading to Gonzi's resignation and eventual retirement from politics.

Gonzi stressed the need to ensure sustainable development and environmental stewardship on the islands, also focusing on strengthening the education and healthcare sectors. In international diplomacy, Gonzi was lauded for his role in the Libyan Revolution, breaking Malta's long relationship with the Gaddafi regime, and siding with the rebels. Additionally, his humanitarian response to the migratory pressures enfolding around Malta led to the first voluntary European migrant burden sharing pact.

== Family and early life ==
Lawrence Gonzi was born on 1 July 1953, in Valletta, British Malta, the son of Luigi Gonzi (1918–3 September 2010) and Ines Gonzi (née Galea) (1920–2008). He is the grandnephew of Mikiel Gonzi, Archbishop of Malta from 1944 until 1976. His younger brother, Michael Gonzi, is a Nationalist backbencher. Gonzi spent his childhood years in the youth section of the local Catholic Action organisation, the Circolo Gioventù Cattolica.

He began his education at the Archbishop's Seminary in Floriana, continuing his studies there until sitting for his matriculation exams. Gonzi attended the University of Malta, studying law and graduating as a lawyer in 1975. After practicing law in a private firm, he worked as a company lawyer with the Mizzi Organisation, serving as group chairman between 1989 and 1997. Gonzi is very active in the voluntary sector, particularly in areas relating to disability and mental health issues. His strong commitment to his Catholic faith led him to join the Malta Catholic Action Movement, serving as its general president between 1976 and 1986. He was also the first chairman of the Kummissjoni Nazzjonali Persuni b’ Diżabilità (KNPD), a national commission for persons with disability.

He is married to Catherine "Kate" Gonzi, née Callus. The couple have three children (David, Mikela and Paul), five grandchildren and live in Marsascala.

== Political career ==
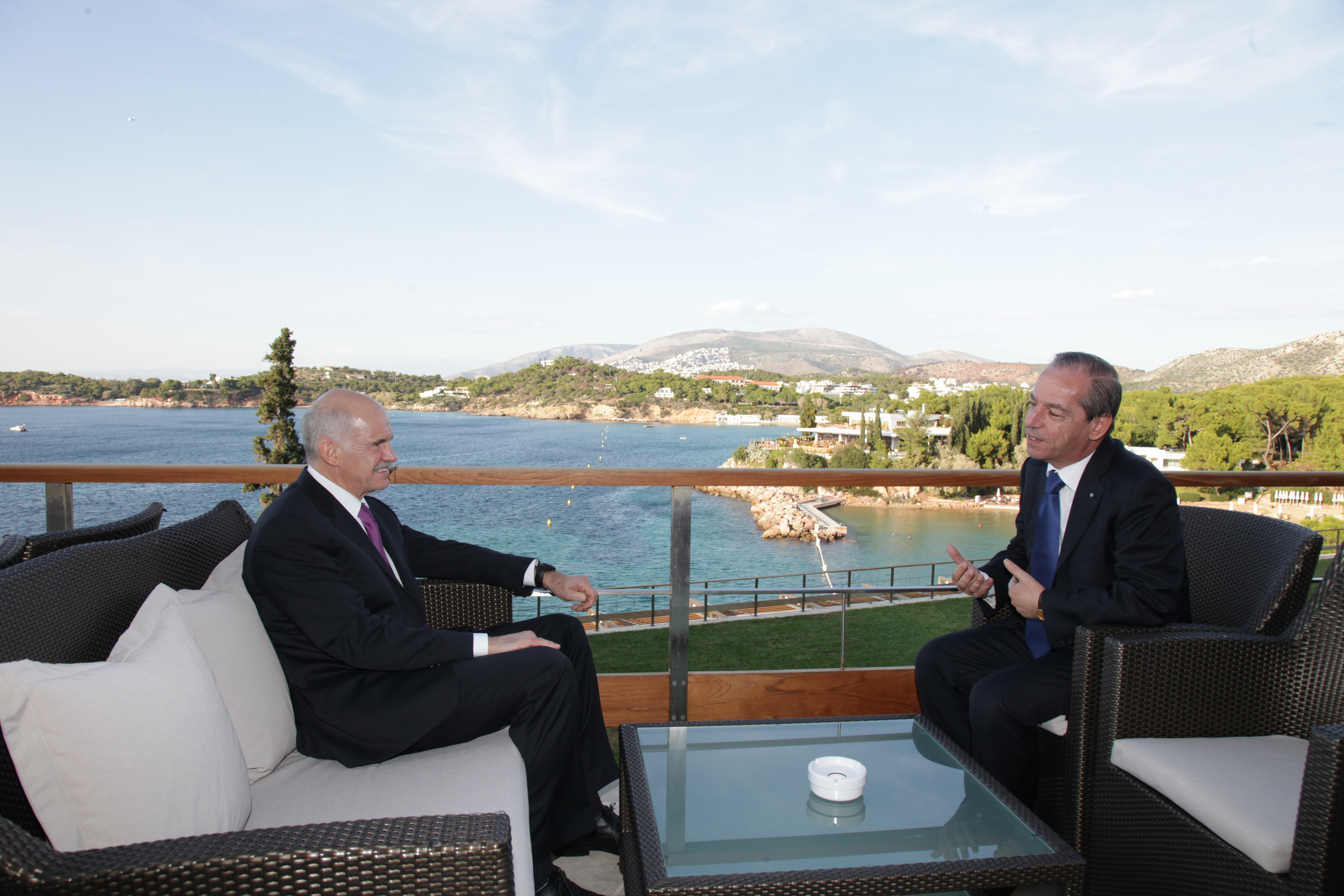
Lawrence Gonzi meeting with Greek prime minister, George Papandreou.

=== Speaker of the House of Representatives ===
The political and religious turmoil in Malta during the 1980s moved him to get involved in local politics. After unsuccessfully contesting the 1987 general election with the Nationalist Party, Gonzi was appointed Speaker of the House of Representatives on 10 October 1988. In 1992, his re-appointment to the post was proposed by the Prime Minister, seconded by the Leader of the Opposition and approved unanimously by the House on 4 April 1992.

During his term as Speaker of the House of Representatives, Gonzi overhauled the methods with which Parliament operated, including the set up of its permanent committees. He also introduced new procedures with regards to the timing of debates between the two sides of the House. His tenure as Speaker of the House of Representatives exposed his modest but firm bearing, which calming fraying tempers in difficult moments for the house.

=== Member of Parliament ===
Gonzi contested the October 1996 general elections and was elected to Parliament on 29 October 1996. In November 1996, he was appointed as Whip for the Opposition, secretary to the Opposition Parliamentary Group, and Shadow Minister for Social Policy. The following year, he was elected Secretary General of the Nationalist Party. After the Nationalist Party won the 1998 election, Gonzi was appointed Minister for Social Policy and Leader of the House of Representatives on 8 September 1998. He also served as deputy prime minister from May 1999 to March 2004.

His negotiating skills and business acumen helped in restructuring the local economy. As Minister for Social Policy, he was driving force behind many social and economic reforms including two milestones which revolutionised social dialogue and industrial relations in Malta. With an economy which was being reformed and opened up in the run-up to Malta's accession to the European Union, the need to overhaul industrial relations legislation became pressing. Gonzi drafted and piloted a new act of parliament, the Employment and Industrial Relations Act (2002). He was also instrumental in setting up the framework for the Malta Council for Economic and Social Development, enabling social partners to make recommendations on social and economic matters. These employment and industrial relations reforms were applied to the restructuring of the Malta shipyards, and the introduction of a stringent zero-tolerance policy for benefit fraud.

Gonzi was re-elected in the 2003 election, and appointed as deputy prime minister and Minister for Social Policy on 15 April 2003.

=== Prime minister ===
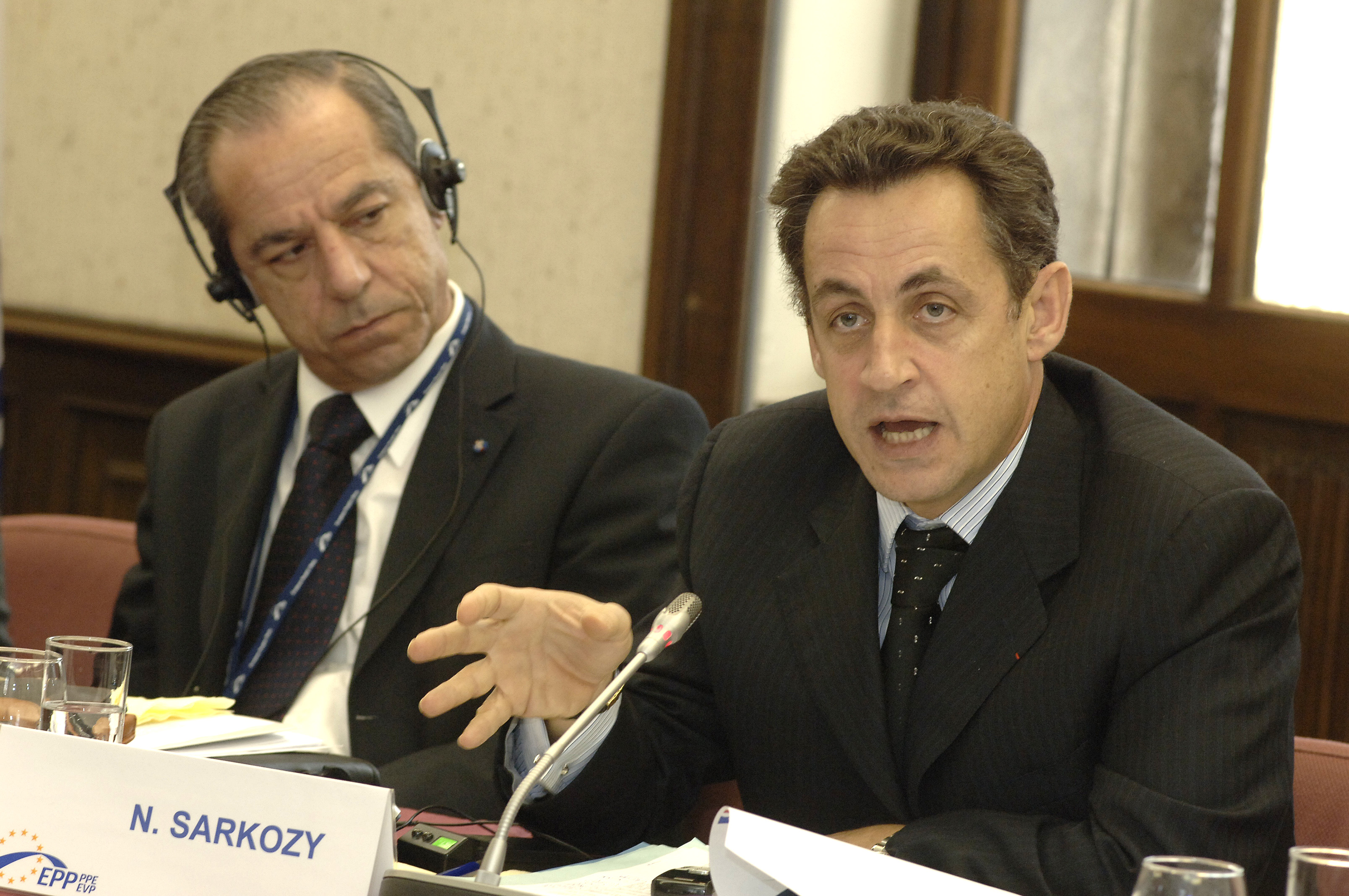
Lawrence Gonzi with Nicolas Sarkozy, at an EPP summit in December 2006.

Following the resignation of Eddie Fenech Adami as party leader, a party leadership contest was held in March 2004. Nominations opened for a week on 9 February. Gonzi, John Dalli and Louis Galea submitted their nominations, with the first round of elections held on 28 February. Gonzi obtained 508 party delegate votes (59.3 percent), Dalli polled 219 votes (25.3 percent) and Galea received 133 (15.4 percent). Galea was eliminated after placing third, and Dalli withdrew his candidature, leaving Gonzi to face the second round of voting alone on 3 March. Lawrence Gonzi was elected leader, obtaining 808 of the 859 votes cast, securing 94.1 per cent of the vote.

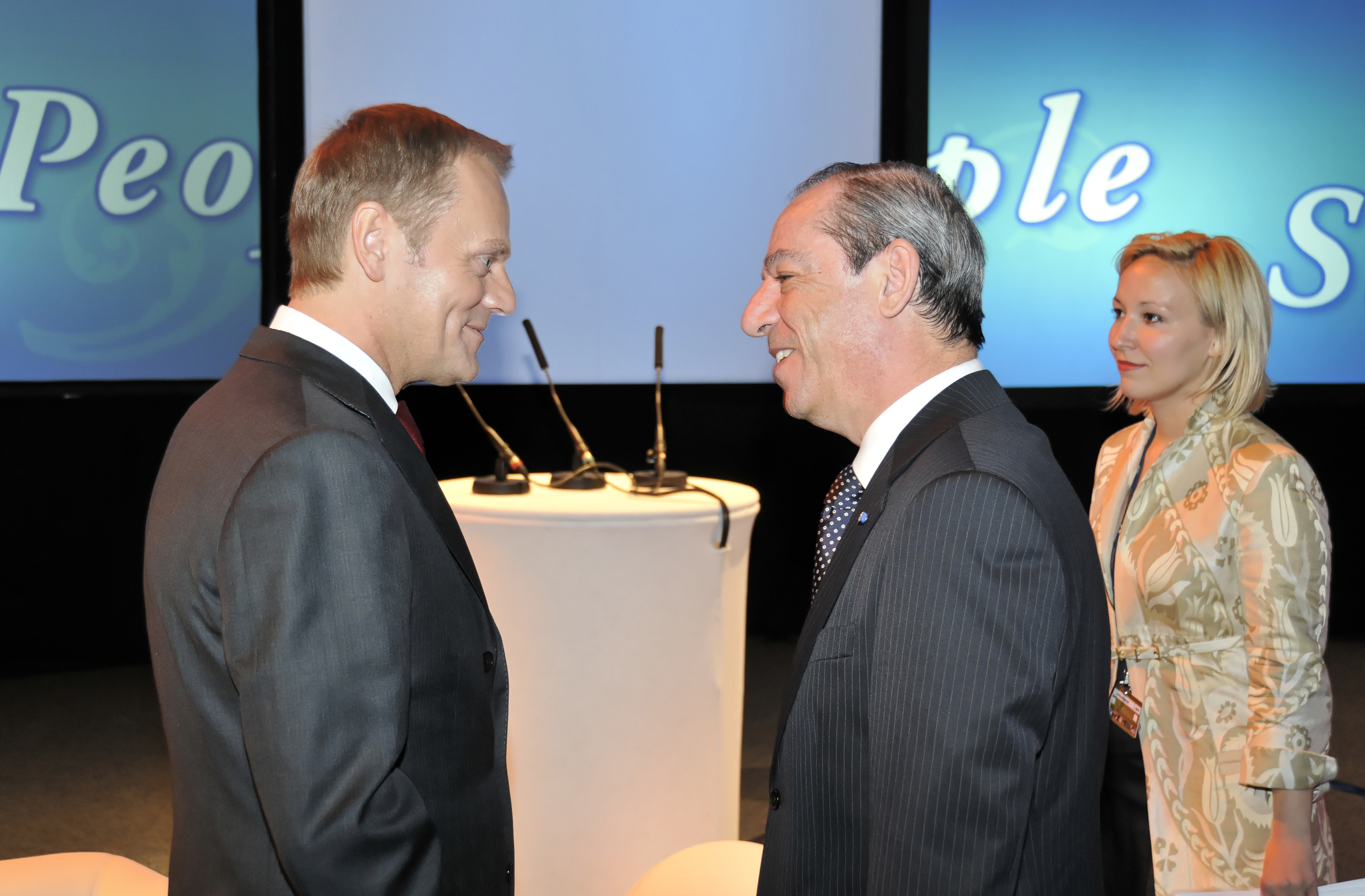
Lawrence Gonzi with Donald Tusk, at an EPP summit in April 2009.

Lawrence Gonzi was appointed prime minister and Minister of Finance on 23 March 2004. George W. Bush, Secretary-General of the United Nations Kofi Annan, and Pope John Paul II, and many other foreign leaders, congratulated Lawrence Gonzi on his new, important responsibilities at a critical time in Malta's history. Malta joined the European Union on 1 May 2004, and as prime minister, Gonzi attended the EU enlargement official ceremony which took place in Dublin, Ireland, where the Maltese flag was hoisted for the first time alongside those of the other member states.

Gonzi in Sliema in 2010.

Gonzi, in his responsibility for the finance portfolio, successfully managed the process to achieve the Maastricht convergence criteria, allowing Malta to join the Eurozone on 1 January 2008. He also embarked upon a drive to improve the management of public finances, focused sharply upon improving Malta's competitiveness in the international market and accelerated the restructuring process of the public sector. Gonzi stressed the importance to attract high-value added sectors of the economy, particularly information technology, biotechnology and pharmaceuticals. His negotiating skills were crucial in Malta obtaining €2.4 billion in EU funds from 2007 onwards, and achieving a voluntary EU burden-sharing agreement on illegal migration.

The first priority of Gonzi's government was to move the country forward, reforming different sectors of the economy such as the restructuring of Air Malta, the Malta shipyards, the Gozo Channel shipping line, public transport and others. These became a priority following Malta's accession to the EU, economic reform became crucial to the country's development. Even if unpopular, Gonzi also pushed for a reform of the pension system, to guarantee its future sustainability. Despite the cost to his party and personal popularity, Lawrence Gonzi continued to push through these reforms, trying to ensure Malta took the best advantage of EU funding available to new member states.

=== 2008 financial crisis re-election ===
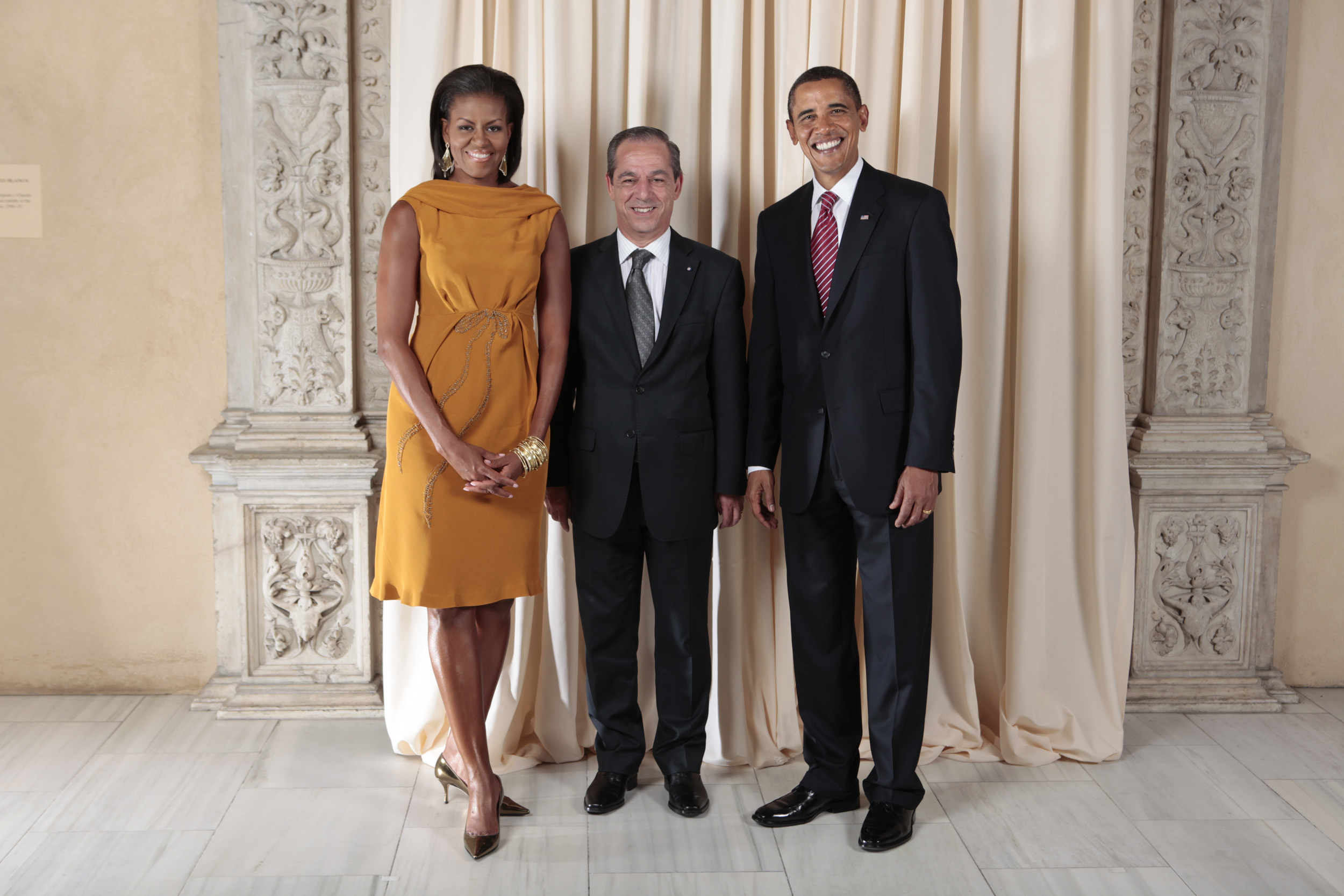
Lawrence Gonzi posing with US President Barack Obama and First Lady Michelle Obama during a reception at the Metropolitan Museum in New York City.

Gonzi was re-elected Prime Minister on 8 March 2008, in a deeply contested general election; he was the first prime minister in the euro area to be re-elected after introducing the euro. The Nationalist Party won this election with a majority of less than 1,200 votes, which translated in a one-seat majority. This proved to be the eventual undoing of the administration. In his first message to the nation at the beginning of this legislature, Gonzi said that the work of his government should be based on sustainable development, putting the environment on par with education and the economy. He relinquished his post as Minister of Finance in favour of Tonio Fenech, but assumed responsibility for the Malta Environment and Planning Authority (MEPA), in particular its reform.

Gonzi's second government focused on crucial aspects of the Maltese economy, dealing with the repercussions of the 2008 financial crisis. His cabinet initiated various projects, such as SmartCity Malta and an architectural showcase project by Renzo Piano in Valletta. Gonzi's government provided financial aid and support to local industries, allowing investment to continue unimpeded and keeping unemployment low in the country. Guarantees were also provided to public-sector companies. In his response to the crisis, Gonzi's macroeconomic focus rested on the creation of employment opportunities. His economic policies were hailed by the President of the European Council, Herman Van Rompuy and the German chancellor, Angela Merkel.

Throughout his administration as prime minister, the restructuring of the Maltese economy was accelerated; Malta became an attractive location for foreign direct investment in financial services, information technology, maritime and aviation hubs and high value-added manufacturing clusters.

=== Libya policy ===
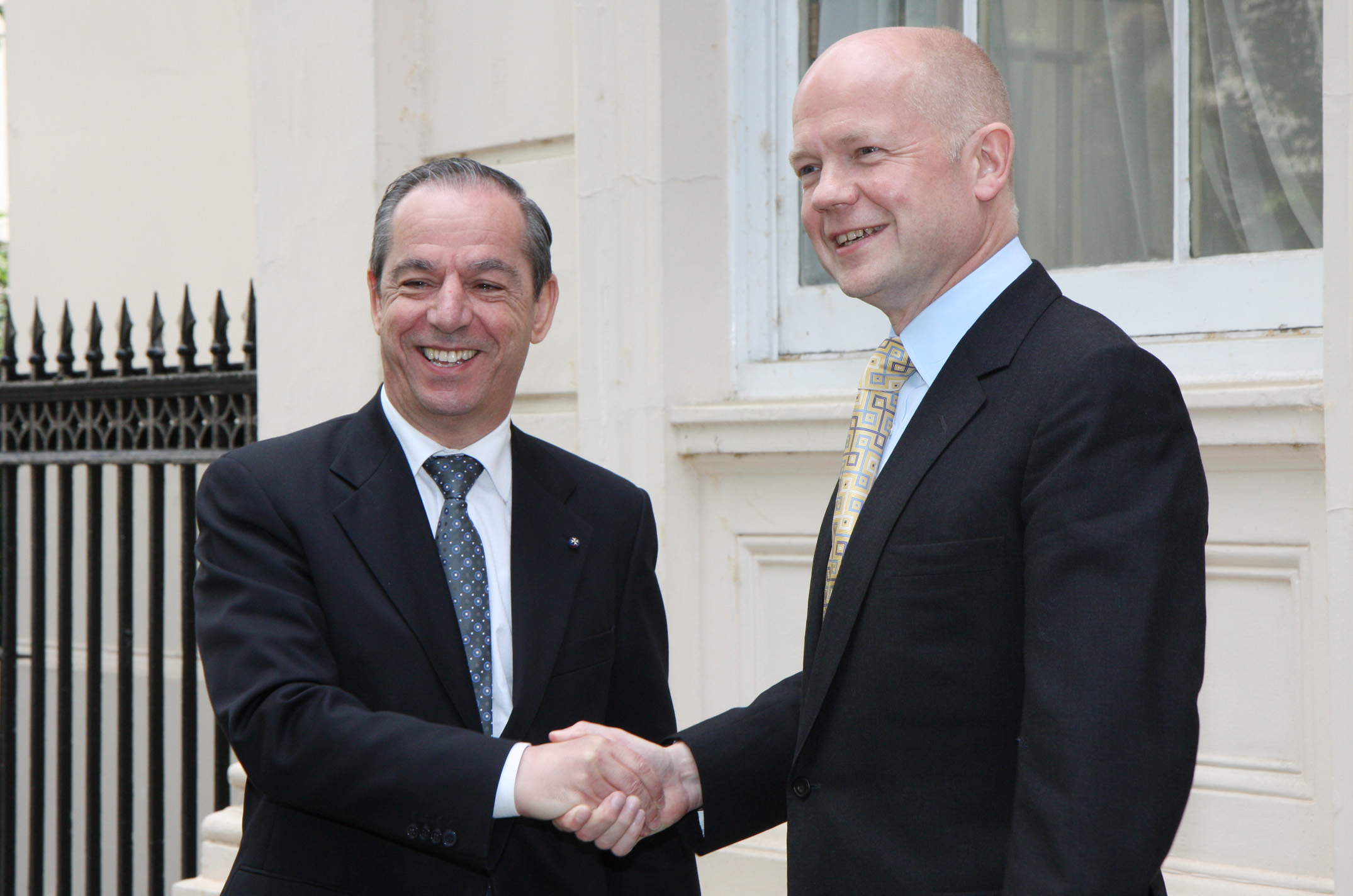
Lawrence Gonzi meeting with the Foreign Secretary of the United Kingdom, William Hague, in London on May 10, 2011.

The Libyan crisis was a major foreign policy challenge for Lawrence Gonzi and his government. The Prime Minister denounced the crimes against humanity being perpetrated by the Gaddafi regime at an early stage of the conflict, when the outcome was not yet clear. Throughout the crisis Malta served as a hub for the evacuation of foreign nationals from Libya. Gonzi provided humanitarian and medical assistance to Libya, granted asylum to two Libyan Air Force pilots who defected after being ordered to bomb protesters in Benghazi. Lawrence Gonzi refused to return the pilots’ jets to the Gaddafi regime, allowing NATO jets to implement a UN-sanctioned no-fly zone to land in Malta whenever necessary, exchanging intelligence on the Libyan conflict with NATO. Gonzi also offered valuable support to other European nations, negotiating the release of two Dutch pilots held captive by Gaddafi's forces.

Lawrence Gonzi also made it clear, back in March 2011, that Gaddafi's exit from Libya was "inevitable", a message he reiterated in early April. Gonzi told the visiting Libyan Deputy Foreign Minister, Abdul-Ati al-Obeidi, that Gaddafi and his family "must go", and the Libyan people's wish for democracy should be respected. Malta's support for the Libyan revolution was appreciated by the country's new rulers, and the chairman of the Transitional National Council, Mustafa Abdul Jalil, made it clear that Malta was to have a "distinguished role" in the rebuilding of Libya.

=== Backbench rebellion and 2013 election ===
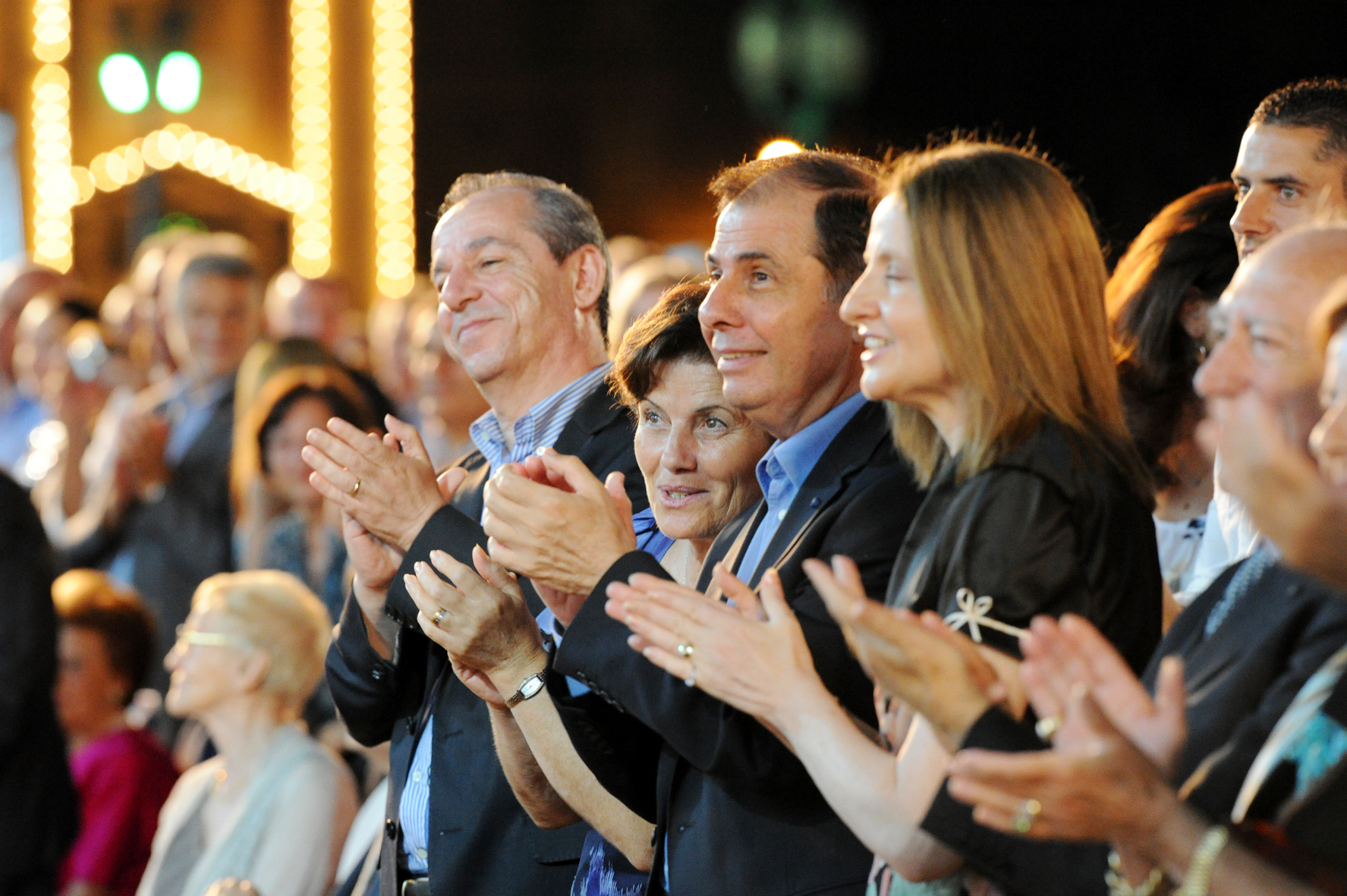
Lawrence Gonzi and the President of Malta, George Abela, at a concert in Floriana in 2010.

The weak, one seat majority of the second Gonzi administration was open to internal divisions and backbencher rebellions. These included the sabotage of plans to construct a museum beneath St. John's Co-Cathedral in Valletta by Jeffrey Pullicino Orlando, who then went on to vote against the government in a motion calling for the resignation of Malta's permanent-representative to the EU, Richard Cachia Caruana. Jesmond Mugliett, a Nationalist MP, abstained on this motion citing concerns with Malta's reactivation of its Partnership for Peace collaboration with NATO - something he believed was pushed by Cachia Caruana.

In another crisis, Franco Debono, the third rebel MP, abstained in a vote of confidence in Transport Minister Austin Gatt, and voted against the government in a no confidence vote on Home Affairs Minister, Carm Mifsud Bonnici. In early 2012, Lawrence Gonzi lost his majority when Pullicino Orlando declared himself to be an independent MP. The Nationalist Party executive condemned the three rebel MPs for their votes on the motions against Mifsud Bonnici and Cachia Caruana. However, Gonzi managed to keep his party in government right until a budget vote on 10 December 2012, when Franco Debono joined the Labour party Opposition, and voted against the budget. Debono's reasons included his belief that the government had mismanaged major privatisation initiatives, as well as dozens of perceived slights to his person. This vote brought down the Nationalist government, with parliament dissolved on 7 January 2013. An election held in March resulted in a Labour victory, by a 35,107 vote margin.

Within half an hour of the start of the vote counting, Gonzi conceded defeat and held a press conference in which he expressed his desire to resign from the PN leadership. Gonzi shouldered "total and complete responsibility" for the electoral defeat, later admitting that mistakes were made "in attitude, arrogance" by his second cabinet. However he insisted that the results achieved by Malta, as an exception to the rest of the EU, were down to his cabinet's performance in the midst of a backbench rebellion. His detractors criticised his lack of resolve in confronting the three dissident backbenchers, Jeffrey Pullicino Orlando, Franco Debono and Jesmond Mugliett. Additionally, Gonzi's principled unwillingness to vote in favour of the introduction of divorce in Parliament, following its approval by the electorate, proved unpopular. His conscientious vote against divorce, however, did not stop him from ensuring there were enough votes on both sides of the House for its ultimate approval.

Gonzi became Leader of the Opposition on 20 March 2013, resigning from this post on 13 May 2013. He was succeeded by Simon Busuttil. Lawrence Gonzi resigned from parliament on 17 July 2013, saying that his seat ought be occupied by someone "who can give the electorate all his energy". Gonzi has since retired from active political life. However, he attends and has given guest lectures in a number of universities and various conferences. His recollections of the critical decisions leading up to Malta's break with Gaddafi were published as a memoir in December 2013. Gonzi also led the Commonwealth Observer Group for the 2013 Maldivian presidential election.

== Honours ==
=== National Honours ===
- Malta:
  - Companion of Honour of the National Order of Merit (2004) by right as a Prime Minister of Malta

=== Foreign Honours ===
- United Kingdom:
  - Honorary Knight Commander of The Most Excellent Order of the British Empire (2005)
- Spain:
  - Knight Grand Cross of the Order of Isabella the Catholic (2009)

== See also ==
- Prime Minister of Malta
- List of prime ministers of Malta

Political offices
Preceded by Jimmy Farrugia	Speaker of the House of Representatives; 1988–1996	Succeeded by Myriam Spiteri Debono
Preceded by John Dalli	Minister of Finance; 2004–2008	Succeeded by Tonio Fenech
Preceded by Guido de Marco	Deputy Prime Minister of Malta; 1999–2004	Succeeded by Tonio Borg
Preceded by Eddie Fenech Adami	Prime Minister of Malta; 2004–2013	Succeeded by Joseph Muscat
Party political offices
Preceded by Austin Gatt	General Secretary of the Nationalist Party; 1998–1999	Succeeded by Joe Saliba
Preceded by Guido de Marco	Deputy Leader of the Nationalist Party; 1999–2004	Succeeded by Tonio Borg
Preceded by Eddie Fenech Adami	Leader of the Nationalist Party; 2004–2013	Succeeded by Simon Busuttil
Diplomatic posts
Preceded by Olusegun Obasanjo	Chairperson of the Commonwealth of Nations; 2005–2007	Succeeded by Yoweri Museveni
