= Louis Galea =

Maltese politician

Auditor of the European Court of Auditors
- In office 2010–2016

Speaker of the House of Representatives of Malta
- In office May 2008 – April 2010

Minister of Education
- In office September 1998 – March 2008

Minister for Social Development
- In office 1995–1996

Minister for Home Affairs and Social Development
- In office 1992–1995

Minister for Social Policy
- In office 1987–1992

Secretary General of the Nationalist Party
- In office 1977–1987

Personal details
- Born: 2 January 1948 (age 78) Mqabba, Malta
- Party: Partit Nazzjonalista
- Spouse: Vincienne nee Zammit
- Children: 4

Louis Galea (born 2 January 1948) is a Maltese politician who was Malta's representative on the European Court of Auditors from 2010 till 2016. Previously he served in the government of Malta as Minister of Education from 1998 to 2008 and was Speaker of the House of Representatives of Malta from 2008 to 2010.

== Education ==
Galea was educated at De La Salle College in Cospicua and at the University of Malta. As a student Galea was one of the main organisers of the campaign for Better Housing in 1968. He was President of the Students’ Catholic Guild (1969), Secretary of the Students’ Representative Council (1972), and President of the Council (1973). During part of his time at University he also held teaching posts in both State and Private schools. At present he lectures on Social Legislation at the University of Malta.

== Political life ==
Galea was Secretary General of the Nationalist Party from 1977 to 1987. A lawyer by profession, he has devoted most of his energies to politics and has contributed in no small way to increasing and maintaining the Party’s organisation and efficiency. This not only involved the setting up of new party clubs and sections throughout Malta and Gozo, but also the development of the Youth and Woman’s Movements as well as the Workers’ Secretariat and the Migrants’ Secretariat. During his term of office the number of paid up party members shot up.

Galea has been a member of the Nationalist Party’s General Council and Executive Committee since 1972 and was a member of the Administrative Council from 1975 to 1987.

Galea was first elected to Parliament in 1976, and re-elected in 1981, 1987, 1992, 1996, 1998 and 2003. Following the 1987 election he was appointed Minister for Social Policy. In 1992 he was appointed Minister for Home Affairs and Social Development.

He remains best known for his role in "The Balavostri Incident", which saw members of the Nationalist Party violently dislocate balustrades from the roof of the Nationalist Party political club of Ħaż-Żebbuġ on 22 November 1981. The balustrades were deliberately thrown onto a crowd of Labour Party supporters gathered in the street below, resulting in 14 injuries. Galea allegedly defended or downplayed the incident by claiming that the balustrades fell on their own (il-balavostri waqgħu weħidhom).

=== Minister for Social Development (1995–1996) ===
In April 1995, Galea was appointed Minister for Social Development responsible for Health, Social Security, Family and Social Welfare, the Elderly and Women.

=== Minister for Education (1998–2008) ===
Following the Nationalist Party victory in the 1998 elections, Galea was appointed Minister for Education. Following the Nationalist Party victory in the 2003 elections, he was re-appointed Minister for Education and confirmed in 2004.

=== Speaker of the House of Representatives of Malta (2008–2010) ===
In March 2008, Louis Galea failed to get elected to the House of Representatives of Malta, losing his seat to Franco Debono. Galea subsequently lost his place in the Cabinet. In May 2008 he was appointed Speaker of the House of Representatives of Malta by a resolution of the House of Representatives.

=== Member of European Court of Auditors (2010–2016) ===
In January 2010, Louis Galea was nominated as Malta's representative at the European Court of Auditors, succeeding Professor Josef Bonnici.
