= Finance Minister of Malta =

Finance Minister of Malta Ministru tal-Finanzi ta' Malta
- Coat of Arms of the Republic of Malta

- Incumbent; Clyde Caruana since 23 November 2020
- Style: The Honourable
- Appointer: President of Malta
- Term length: General elections are held every five years at a maximum, but may be held sooner. No term limits are imposed on the office.
- Formation: 1921 (105 years ago)
- Website: finance.gov.mt

The finance minister of Malta is the head of the Ministry for Finance.

== Constitutional functions ==
The finance minister has an important constitutional role. This constitution assigns the exclusive competence to the finance minister to initiate a legislative bill on financial measures. This means that financial measures cannot be introduced through a private member's bills amongst others. Furthermore, the constitution assigns the duty to the finance minister to lay before the House of Representatives not later than thirty days after, the commencement of each financial year estimates of the revenues and expenditure of Malta for that year.

== See also ==
- List of finance ministers of Malta
