= List of finance ministers of Malta =

This is a list of people who held the portfolio of Finance Minister of Malta.

== Cabinets from 1921 to 1958 ==
- Joseph Howard, 1921–1924
- Ugo Pasquale Mifsud, 1924
- Carmelo Mifsud Bonnici, Il-Gross, 1924–1927
- Achille Samut, 1927–1930
- Carmelo Mifsud Bonnici, Il-Gross, 1932–1933
- Arthur F. Colombo, 1947–1950
- John Frendo Azzopardi, 1950
- Gorg Borg Olivier, 1950–1951
- John Frendo Azzopardi, 1951–1955
- Dom Mintoff, 1955–1958

== Cabinets since 1962 ==
Political parties

Nationalist Party Labour Party

Fourteen people have served as Finance Minister of Malta since 1962.

Finance Minister			Term of office			Political party
No.	Portrait	Name (Birth–Death)	No.	Took office	Left office	Political party
1		Giovanni Felice (1899–1977)	1st	5 March 1962	1963	Nationalist Party
2		Giorgio Borġ Olivier (1911–1980)		1963	1964	Nationalist Party
3		Tommaso Caruana Demajo (1910–1973)		1964	7 April 1966	Nationalist Party
(1)		Giovanni Felice (1899–1977)	2nd	7 April 1966	21 June 1971	Nationalist Party
4		Joseph Abela (1922–1995)		21 June 1971	9 July 1979	Labour Party
5		Ġużè Cassar (1918–2001)		9 July 1979	20 December 1981	Labour Party
6		Lino Spiteri (1932–2014)	1st	20 December 1981	3 September 1983	Labour Party
7		Wistin Abela (1933–2014)		3 September 1983	12 May 1987	Labour Party
8		George Bonello du Puis (1928–2010)		12 May 1987	27 February 1992	Nationalist Party
9		John Dalli (1948–)	1st	27 February 1992	28 October 1996	Nationalist Party
(6)		Lino Spiteri (1932–2014)	2nd	29 October 1996	26 March 1997	Labour Party
10		Leo Brincat (1949–)		26 March 1997	6 September 1998	Labour Party
(9)		John Dalli (1948–)	2nd	8 September 1998	23 March 2004	Nationalist Party
11		Lawrence Gonzi (1953–)		23 March 2004	12 March 2008	Nationalist Party
12		Tonio Fenech (1969–)		12 March 2008	13 March 2013	Nationalist Party
13		Edward Scicluna (1946–)		13 March 2013	22 November 2020	Labour Party
14		Clyde Caruana (1985–)		22 November 2020	Incumbent	Labour Party

== See also ==
- Government of Malta

== Sources ==
- Maltese ministries, etc – Rulers.org
