= Malta Independence Fiftieth Anniversary Medal =

- Ribbon bar of the medal
- Type: National Commemorative Medal
- Awarded for: Contributions to the development and well-being of Malta as a nation and a member of the international community of nations in the 50 years since independence.
- Description: Circular cupro-nickel medal
- Presented by: Malta
- Established: 22 August 2014
- First award: 21 September 2014

Precedence
- Next (higher): Malta Self-Government Re-introduction Seventy-Fifth Anniversary Medal
- Next (lower): Distinguished Service Medal

The Malta Independence Fiftieth Anniversary Medal is a national commemorative medal of the Republic of Malta. The medal is awarded by the president of Malta to recognize contributions to the development and well-being of Malta as a nation and a member of the international community of nations since the State of Malta gained independence in 1964. The medal, which may be awarded posthumously, has been awarded to former presidents, prime ministers, and other notable Maltese politicians.

== Appearance ==
The Malta Independence Fiftieth Anniversary Medal is circular, 36 mm (1.4 in) wide, and made of cupro-nickel. The obverse of the medal depicts the coat of arms of Malta, with the year 2014 at its base. The reverse bears a depiction of the coat of arms of Malta of 1964 in the center, circumscribed in relief by ĦAMSIN ANNIVERSARJU MILLINDIPENDENZA separated by a Maltese Cross from the inscription MALTA 1964 at the base. The medal's suspension ribbon is 32 mm (1.3 in) wide, divided into equal halves of white and red. The medal attached to the ribbon by a bar-type suspension. On the bar is a design, in relief, of an olive branch and palm frond joined at the middle. Recipients' names are engraved on the rim of the medal.

== Notable recipients ==
- Dr George Abela
- Dr Edward Fenech Adami
- Agatha Barbara †
- Dr Karmenu Mifsud Bonnici
- Dr Ugo Mifsud Bonnici
- Dr Anton Buttigieg †
- Professor Guido de Marco †
- Dr Lawrence Gonzi
- Sir Anthony Mamo †
- Dom Mintoff †
- Joseph Muscat
- Dr Giorgio Borg Olivier †
- Dr Alfred Sant
- Dr Ċensu Tabone †
- Paul Xuereb †

†=posthumous award
