= Lino Spiteri =

Maltese writer and politician

Lino Spiteri KOM

Finance Minister of Malta
- In office December 1981 – September 1983
- Preceded by: Ġużè Cassar
- Succeeded by: Wistin Abela
- In office September 1996 – March 1997
- Preceded by: John Dalli
- Succeeded by: Leo Brincat

Personal details
- Born: 23 September 1938 Qormi, Malta
- Died: 14 November 2014 (aged 76)
- Party: Labour Party
- Spouse: Vivienne Azzopardi
- Children: 4
- Education: St Peter's College, Oxford

Lino Spiteri (23 September 1938 – 14 November 2014) was a Maltese writer and politician. He served as Finance Minister from 1981 to 1983, and again from 1996 to 1997.

== Biography ==
Spiteri graduated in politics and economics at St Peter's College, Oxford and got involved in politics in 1957 as a member of the Labour Party's national executive committee. He was first elected to Parliament in 1962, at 23 years, and served in Parliament for 21 years.

From 1964 until 1966 Spiteri was deputy editor of It-Torca, and head of publications at Union Press.

Spiteri worked as a research officer with the Malta Chamber of Commerce, and joined the Central Bank of Malta in 1970, later serving as its deputy governor during the Mintoff years, with the nationalisation of private banks.

Spiteri served as Finance Minister from 1981 to 1983 and as Trade and Economic Planning Minister from 1983 to 1987. He did not always have a good relation with Prime Minister Dom Mintoff.

In 1992 Spiteri contested the party leadership following the resignation of Karmenu Mifsud Bonnici, but he was defeated by Alfred Sant.

In 1996, Prime Minister Alfred Sant appointed Spiteri as Finance Minister, but he resigned only five months later, in 1997, following Sant's announcement that he would remove VAT, a policy which he disagreed with, and on which he had not been consulted. With the electoral defeat of Labour in 1998, Spiteri left politics. In the following years, he was a regular political commentator and analyst on the country's newspapers.

In 2003, differently from the Labour Party line, he voted in favour of EU membership.

In 2008 he was awarded Ġieħ ir-Repubblika and made Companion of the Order of Merit (K.O.M).

Spiteri authored several novels and short stories such as Anatomija - short stories and Il-Halliel u stejjer ohra, and was a regular newspaper contributor.

He was married with four children.
