= Malta Self-Government Re-introduction Seventy-Fifth Anniversary Medal =

- Ribbon bar of the medal
- Type: National Commemorative Medal
- Description: Circular silver medal
- Country: Malta
- Presented by: the President of Malta
- Eligibility: Living Members of the Senate, Legislative Assembly, or House of Representatives who have served since 1 November 1921
- Established: 14 May 1996
- First award: 7 June 1996

Precedence
- Next (higher): Malta George Cross Fiftieth Anniversary Medal
- Next (lower): Malta Independence Fiftieth Anniversary Medal

The Malta Self-Government Re-introduction Seventy-Fifth Anniversary Medal is a national commemorative medal of the Republic of Malta. The medal was established on 14 May 1996 to commemorate the establishment, within the Crown Colony of Malta, of self-government and the Parliament of Malta. The medal is awarded to individuals who have served as a Member of the Senate, Legislative Assembly, or House of Representatives since 1 November 1921. Recipients must alive on 7 June 1996. Those who were member of the House of Representatives are eligible for the award of the medal once they cease being member of that body.

== Appearance ==
The Malta Self-Government Re-introduction Seventy-Fifth Anniversary Medal is circular, 36 mm (1.4 in) wide, and made of silver. The obverse of the medal depicts the Coat of arms of Malta. The reverse bears the year 1921 surrounded by a wreath of oak leaves bound at the top, bottom, and sides. Encircling the wreath is the inscription RE-INTRODUZZJONI TA' GVERN RESPONSABBLI * IL-ĦAMSA U SEBGĦIN ANNIVERSARJU * 1996 * in relief. The Medal's suspension ribbon is 32 mm (1.3 in) wide. It is green with two narrow 3 mm (0.12 in) stripes in the center of white and red. The medal is attached to the ribbon by a bar-type suspension. On the bar is a design, in relief, of an olive branch and palm frond joined at the middle. Recipients' names are engraved on the rim of the medal.

== Notable recipients ==
The following individuals were awarded the Malta Self-Government Re-introduction Seventy-Fifth Anniversary Medal:

- Wistin Abela
- Agatha Barbara, K.U.O.M.
- H.E. Dr Ugo Mifsud Bonnici, K.U.O.M.
- Prof. Edwin Busuttil
- Magistrate Joe Cassar
- Dr Joseph Cefai
- H.E. Prof Guido de Marco, K.U.O.M.
- John Dalli
- Michael Falzon
- Joe Grima
- Judge Fortunato Mizzi
- Dr Josie Muscat
- Dr Daniel Piscopo, U.O.M.
- Dr Frank Portelli
- Dr Joseph Spiteri
- Lino Spiteri
- Dr Censu Tabone, K.U.O.M.

In 2011, Frank Portelli asked for his name to be removed from the list of recipients, in protest at the award of a Maltese Honour to Muammar Gaddafi of Libya.
