= List of justice ministers of Malta =

Seventeen people have served as Justice Minister of Malta since the office was established in 1962.

Political parties

Nationalist Party Labour Party

Justice Minister			Term of office			Political party
No.	Portrait	Name (Birth–Death)	No.	Took office	Left office	Political party
1		Giovanni Felice (1899–1977)		5 March 1962	1963	Nationalist Party
2		Tommaso Caruana Demajo (1910–1973)		1963	21 June 1971	Nationalist Party
3		Anton Buttigieg (1912–1983)		21 June 1971	15 October 1976	Labour Party
4		Ġużè Cassar (1918–2001)	1st	15 October 1976	9 July 1979	Labour Party
5		Joe Brincat (1944–2024)		9 July 1979	20 December 1981	Labour Party
(4)		Ġużè Cassar (1918–2001)	2nd	20 December 1981	12 May 1987	Labour Party
6		Guido de Marco (1931–2010)		12 May 1987	27 February 1992	Nationalist Party
7		Joe Fenech (1931–2005)		27 February 1992	1 April 1995	Nationalist Party
8		Michael Refalo (1936–2015)		1 April 1995	28 October 1996	Nationalist Party
9		Charles Mangion (1952–)		29 October 1996	3 February 1998	Labour Party
10		Gavin Gulia (1963–)		4 February 1998	6 September 1998	Labour Party
11		Austin Gatt (1953–)		8 September 1998	15 April 2003	Nationalist Party
12		Tonio Borg (1957–)		15 April 2003	12 March 2008	Nationalist Party
13		Carmelo Mifsud Bonnici (1960–)		12 March 2008	6 January 2012	Nationalist Party
14		Chris Said (1970–)		6 January 2012	13 March 2013	Nationalist Party
Justice portfolio absorbed within the Office of the Prime Minister (13 March 2013 – 2 April 2014)
15		Owen Bonnici (1980–)		2 April 2014	15 January 2020	Labour Party
16		Edward Zammit Lewis (1972–)		15 January 2020	30 March 2022	Labour Party
17		Jonathan Attard (1984–)		30 March 2022	03 June 2026	Labour Party
18		Clifton Grima		03 June 2026	Incumbent	Labour Party

== See also ==
- Government of Malta
- Justice ministry
- Politics of Malta

== Sources ==
- Maltese ministries, etc – Rulers.org
