= Agatha Barbara =

President of Malta from 1982 to 1987

Her Excellency Agatha Barbara KUOM
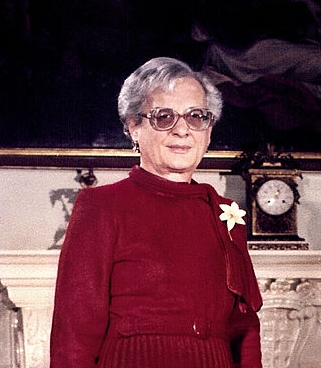

3rd President of Malta
- In office 15 February 1982 – 15 February 1987
- Prime Minister: Dom Mintoff; Karmenu Mifsud Bonnici
- Preceded by: Albert Hyzler (Acting); Anton Buttigieg
- Succeeded by: Paul Xuereb (Acting); Ċensu Tabone

Personal details
- Born: 11 March 1923 Żabbar, Malta
- Died: 4 February 2002 (aged 78) Żabbar, Malta
- Resting place: Żabbar Cemetery
- Party: Labour Party
- Awards: Companion of Honour of the National Order of Merit; Malta Self-Government Re-introduction Seventy-Fifth Anniversary Medal; Malta Independence Fiftieth Anniversary Medal; Order of the Balkan Mountains 1st Class; Order of the National Flag 1st Class; Nishan-e-Pakistan

Agatha Barbara, KUOM (11 March 1923 – 4 February 2002) was a Maltese politician, having served as a Labour Member of Parliament and Minister. She was the first woman to serve as president of Malta, and remains the longest-serving woman Member of Parliament in Maltese political history.

== Early life ==
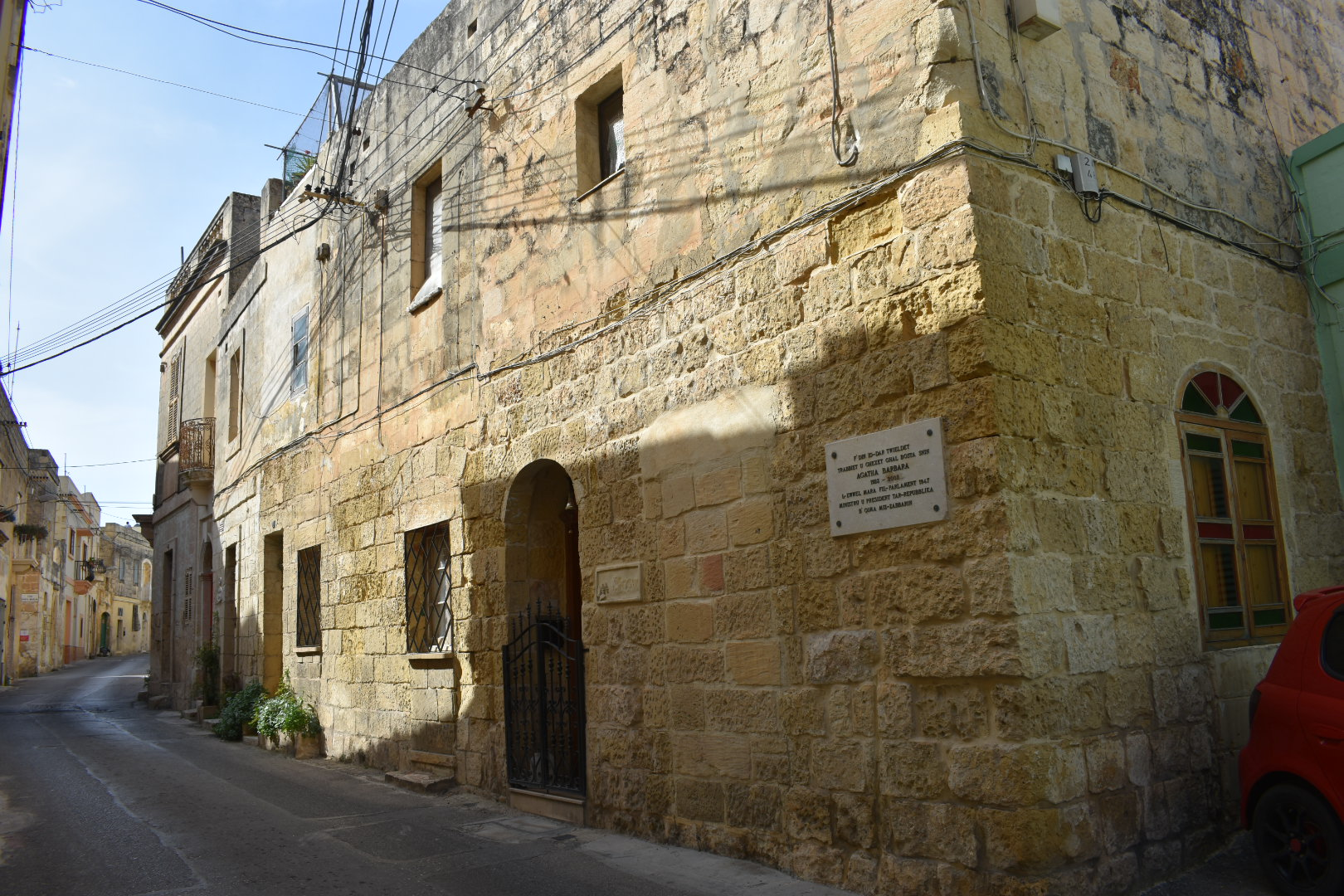
Birthplace of Agatha Barbara in Żabbar

Barbara was born in Żabbar, Malta, in 1923. Her father worked as a tug master (a skilled pilot of tugboats) for the Royal Navy, and was very poorly paid. Her mother struggled to feed the nine children on her husband's wages. Agatha was the second child and the eldest daughter.

She pleaded her parents to send her to school and attended grammar school in Valletta, but World War II prevented her from continuing to college. She had to work as an air raid warden and supervised one of the kitchens set up by the British military to feed the population.

After the war she became a school teacher and got involved in politics. She became a member of the Malta Labour Party (MLP), was very active in party affairs, became member of the MLP executive committee, headed the party women's branch and founded the Women's Political Movement in Malta.

== Political life ==
From 1947, Malta had limited self-government. Voting rights for women were raised by the Women of Malta Association and the Malta Labour Party against loud protests from the Church. The proposal was adopted by a narrow majority. The clashes spurred Barbara to show what women could do, so when people encouraged her, she stood for election in 1947. She became the first and only woman among the 40 MPs, and she was the only woman candidate to successfully contest in ten consecutive elections, until 1982, when she resigned to become president.

Agatha Barbara became known as a warm defender of economic and social reforms. She was Malta's first and until the end of the 1990s only woman cabinet minister. When MLP came to power for the first time in 1955, she was appointed as education minister by Dom Mintoff from 1955 to 1958. She undertook comprehensive reforms: instituted compulsory full-time basic education for all children, established a teacher training college and special schools for the disabled, made secondary school free and provided science classes for both girls and boys. In 1958 relations between the British and the Maltese deteriorated. Protests erupted in the streets and Mintoff resigned. Barbara participated in the demonstrations and was sentenced to 43 days "with hard labour".

When Mintoff came to power again in 1971, Agatha Barbara was appointed minister of education again. Now compulsory basic education was extended from the age of 14 to 16, trade and technical schools were established and university fees were abolished. In 1974 she became minister for labour, culture and welfare. She worked to reduce unemployment and improve workers' pay and conditions and industrial relations. She introduced a law on equal pay for women and men, paid maternity leave, a 40-hour working week and retirement and unemployment benefits. She also set up a number of national museums. In 1976 Agatha Barbara became deputy chair of the MLP parliamentary group, but not of the party, and deputy prime minister. For shorter periods she served as deputy for Mintoff.

Barbara also took a prominent role in protecting Maltese heritage, playing a crucial role in the restoration of historic buildings in Mdina and Valletta, and promoting their use as museums.

== Presidency ==
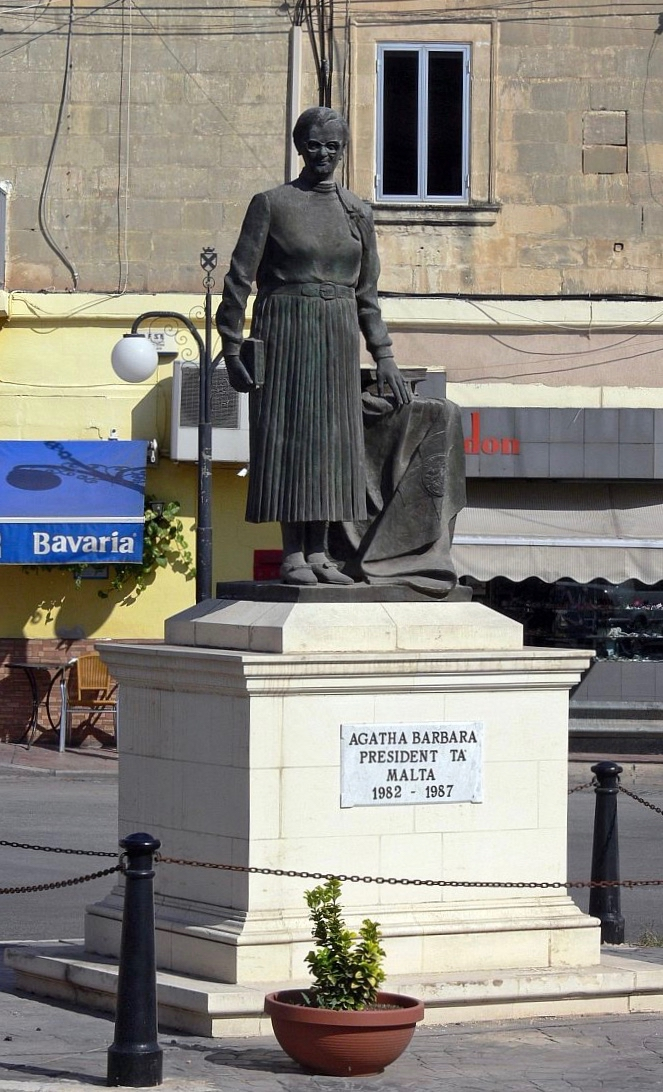
Memorial to Barbara in Żabbar

In 1981 elections led to a constitutional crisis because the Nationalist Party (PN) won a majority of the votes, but only got a minority in parliament: 31 seats against 34 for MLP. PN boycotted parliament and organized protests. Nevertheless, Mintoff took power, but instead of becoming minister, Barbara was appointed as the first woman president, 59 years old, on 15 February 1982. She was the third President of the Republic.

Usually the position was mainly ceremonial, but her task now was to resolve the constitutional crises. At the end of her term in 1987, Barbara presided over the presentation and acceptance of the 1987 Constitutional reform, ranging from the cementing of Malta's independence from foreign powers, to the allocation of additional Parliamentary seats in case a Party obtains an absolute majority of votes at a general election without achieving a Parliamentary majority. In 1987 her term expired and she withdrew from politics.

Barbara appeared on a series of Maltese banknotes which were issued in 1986. She retired in Żabbar, where she was born, and died in 2002. A monument in her honor was unveiled in Żabbar on 23 April 2006 by the then President of Malta, Dr. Edward Fenech Adami.

== Private life ==
Barbara was never married. Maltese-Australian author Joseph Chetcuti claimed Barbara was a lesbian in his 2009 book on the LGBT history of Malta, based on interviews with her contemporaries.

In 2014 alleged "romantic letters" written by Barbara to Derek Barnes, a Royal Navy signalman stationed in Malta during World War II, were made public by Barnes' sister.

== Honours ==
=== National ===
- Malta:
  - Companion of Honour of the National Order of Merit (1990) by right as a former president of Malta
  - Malta Self-Government Re-introduction Seventy-Fifth Anniversary Medal (1996)
  - Malta Independence Fiftieth Anniversary Medal (2014) posthumous

=== Foreign honours ===
- Bulgaria:
  - Order of the Balkan Mountains 1st Class
- North Korea:
  - Order of the National Flag 1st Class (1985)
- Pakistan:
  - Nishan-e-Pakistan

Political offices
Preceded by Albert Hyzler; Acting	President of Malta; 1982–1987	Succeeded by Paul Xuereb; Acting
