= Karmenu Mifsud Bonnici =

Maltese politician (1933–2022)

The Honourable Dr. Karmenu Mifsud Bonnici KUOM
- Official portrait, 1984

9th Prime Minister of Malta
- In office 22 December 1984 – 12 May 1987
- President: Agatha Barbara; Paul Xuereb (acting)
- Preceded by: Dom Mintoff
- Succeeded by: Eddie Fenech Adami

5th Leader of the Malta Labour Party
- In office 22 December 1984 – 26 March 1992
- Preceded by: Dom Mintoff
- Succeeded by: Alfred Sant

Personal details
- Born: 17 July 1933 Cospicua, Crown Colony of Malta
- Died: 5 November 2022 (aged 89)
- Party: Labour Party
- Parent(s): Lorenzo Mifsud Bonnici; Caterina Buttigieg
- Education: University of Malta; B.A., LL.D. University College London; LL.M. (UCL)
- Occupation: Politician, lawyer
- Profession: Lawyer
- Awards: Companion of Honour of the National Order of Merit; Malta Self-Government Re-introduction Seventy-Fifth Anniversary Medal; Malta Independence Fiftieth Anniversary Medal

Karmenu Mifsud Bonnici, KUOM (17 July 1933 – 5 November 2022) was a Maltese politician who served as Prime Minister of Malta from December 1984 to May 1987.

== Biography ==
Karmenu was born on 17 July 1933 at Cospicua to Lorenzo Mifsud Bonnici and Catherine Buttigieg, in a family strongly anchored in the Nationalist Party. His brother Antoine was a Nationalist MP and Parliamentary Secretary while a cousin, Ugo Mifsud Bonnici, was a Nationalist MP, Minister and President of Malta. Karmenu had two sisters and three brothers, one of whom (Antoine) is a Nationalist member of Parliament and another was an Archpriest. He never married.

Karmenu Mifsud Bonnici studied at the Lyceum and graduated in Law at the University of Malta in 1954. He also later studied taxation and industrial law at the University College of London in 1967–68, and was afterwards a lecturer in Industrial and Fiscal Law at the University of Malta.

In the 1960s, at the height of the dispute between the Maltese Church and the Labour Party, he was an official of a number of lay organisations connected to the Church, including the Catholic Social Guild and the Young Christian Workers Movement (also as editorial board member of their Il-Haddiem newspaper), and supported the "diocesan junta" of Church organisations opposing Dom Mintoff and his Party. He would later claim to be "a Nationalist by birth, but a Labourite through free choice and conviction".

In 1969, he got a job as a local consultant of Malta's General Workers' Union, playing a role in the struggle of the trade union and the Labour party against the Nationalist government-proposed Industrial Relations Bill, which foresaw sanctions up to imprisonment for workers on strike. He continued his engagement with the Labour Party throughout the 1970s.

=== Labour Party leader and Prime minister ===
In May 1980, Dom Mintoff appointed Karmenu Mifsud Bonnici as deputy leader of the Labour Party, which was confirmed by the party conference. Mifsud Bonnici managed the party campaign for the 1981 elections - the third and last victory of Mintoff's Labour.

In October 1981, Mintoff designated Mifsud Bonnici as his successor, again confirmed by the party conference. Karmenu Mifsud Bonnici was thus co-opted into Parliament in May 1983 upon the resignation of Paul Xuereb, and assigned the Ministry of Employment and Social Services, without ever standing for election. This gained him the nickname of "Doctor Zero". Several commentators consider that Mintoff hand-picked Mifsud Bonnici to prevent the election of other, less amenable, internal rivals at the helm of the party.

In September 1983, Mifsud Bonnici was named Senior Deputy Prime Minister and assigned the Ministry of Education, a responsibility he held until 1986, during which period he was in charge of the introduction of free education for all, which had led to a deep dispute between the government and the Church.

On 22 December 1984, following Mintoff's resignation, Karmenu Mifsud Bonnici was sworn in as prime minister, thus becoming the first Maltese prime minister since independence to be sworn in without actually standing for a general election. He also maintained the portfolios of Minister of Interior and of Education.

Mifsud Bonnici's tenure as Prime Minister was seen as a continuation of the Dom Mintoff years (he even retained the same Cabinet). Political violence persisted, heightened and was made more intense by the fact that the 1987 elections were approaching. Relations with the church deteriorated further on two fronts: the enactment of a Bill to seize church property without compensation, and attempts by the government to take control of church schools.

In 1984, a demonstration by some workers of the Malta Drydocks, at which Mifsud Bonnici was present, climaxed when the offices of the Maltese Curia were ransacked after the demonstration had ended. He responded by calling the workers "the aristocracy of the working class".

In 1985, Karmenu Mifsud Bonnici was the lead negotiator in the hijacking of EgyptAir Flight 648 in which 60 of the 92 passengers were killed.

Mifsud Bonnici narrowly lost the 1987 elections and was made to carry most of the blame for the defeat - which might have had a role in the heart attack he suffered soon after. He remained Leader of the Opposition until 1992 when, following a second electoral defeat, he resigned and was succeeded by Alfred Sant. He held his seat until the following election in 1996. He did not contest any general elections thereafter.

=== Later years ===
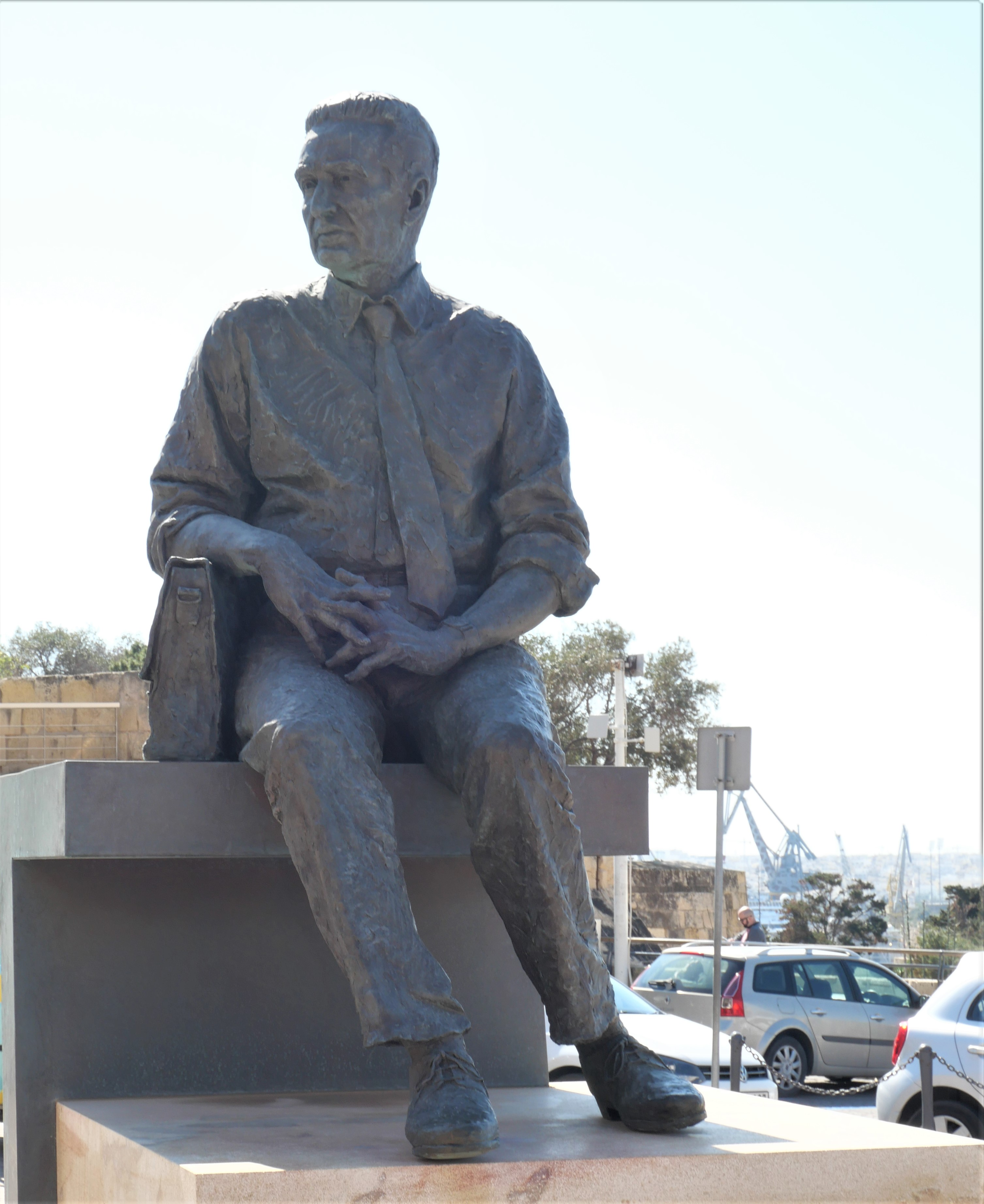
Sculpture of Karmenu Mifsud Bonnici in Castille Square Valetta

In 2003, during the referendum campaign for the accession of Malta to the European Union, Mifsud Bonnici with other labourites launched the Campaign for National Independence (CNI) and later joined the Front Maltin Inqumu (Maltese Arise Front) to oppose Malta's EU membership. They proposed instead an alternative association agreement, or "partnership", reviving an earlier Mintoff vision of Malta as the "Switzerland of the Mediterranean".

Two years later he also opposed the ratification of the European Constitution, but his motion at the Labour Party's General Conference in 2005 was rejected. Subsequently, he maintained a low profile within the party while retaining a role in the CNI.

Mifsud Bonnici died on 5 November 2022, at the age of 89.

== Honours ==
- Companion of Honour of the National Order of Merit (1990) by right as a former Prime Minister of Malta
- Malta Self-Government Re-introduction Seventy-Fifth Anniversary Medal (1996)
- Malta Independence Fiftieth Anniversary Medal (2014)

== See also ==
- Prime Minister of Malta
- List of prime ministers of Malta

Political offices
Preceded by Dominic Mintoff	Prime Minister of Malta; 1984–1987	Succeeded by Eddie Fenech Adami
Party political offices
Preceded by Dominic Mintoff	Leader of the Labour Party; 1984–1992	Succeeded by Alfred Sant
