= George Bonello du Puis =

Maltese politician

George Bonello du Puis MP

High Commissioner of Malta for the UK
- In office 1999–2004

Minister of Economic Services
- In office 1992–1995
- Prime Minister: Eddie Fenech Adami

Finance Minister
- In office 1987–1992
- Prime Minister: Eddie Fenech Adami
- Preceded by: Wistin Abela
- Succeeded by: John Dalli

Personal details
- Born: 28 Jan 1928 Sliema
- Died: 19 February 2010 (aged 82)
- Party: Nationalist Party (Malta)
- Spouse: Iris Bonello du Puis
- Children: 3

George Bonello du Puis was a Maltese politician who served as Malta’s High Commissioner in London from 1999 to 2007. He was also a member of Parliament of Malta and served as Finance Minister after the 1987 elections and served as Economic Services Minister between 1992 and 1995.

== Career ==
Bonello du Puis entered politics with the Christian Workers' Party in 1966, and was first elected as a Nationalist Party member in Parliament in 1971. He was returned to Parliament in the 1976, 1981, 1987 and 1992 elections.

Dr Bonello du Puis served as Finance Minister after the 1987 elections and as Minister of Economic Services between 1992 and 1995. He was also High Commissioner of Malta for the UK between 1998 and 2004 and served as Sliema Wanderers president between 1962 and 1987, as well as between 1995 and 1996.

Dr Bonello du Puis also served for many years as PN treasurer and introduced income tax reforms in the first Eddie Fenech Adami government.

== Personal life ==
He had a wife Iris and they had two sons and a daughter.

Political offices
Preceded by Wistin Abela	Finance Minister of Malta; 1987–1992	Succeeded by John Dalli
