= Joe Brincat (politician) =

Maltese politician (1944–2024)

Minister of Justice
- In office 9 July 1979 – 20 December 1981
- Preceded by: Joseph Cassar
- Succeeded by: Joseph Cassar

Personal details
- Born: 22 March 1944 Gżira, Crown Colony of Malta
- Died: 2 August 2024 (aged 80)
- Party: Labour
- Occupation: Lawyer

Joe Brincat (22 March 1944 – 2 August 2024) was a Maltese lawyer and politician. A member of the Labour Party, he served as Minister of Justice from 1979 to 1981.

Brincat died on 2 August 2024, at the age of 80.
