= List of honorary companions of honour of the National Order of Merit (Malta) =

Companion of Honour is one of the four grades of the National Order of Merit of Malta.

== Honorees ==
=== With Collar ===
Prior to becoming Honorary Companions of Honour with Collar, the following honorees were Honorary Companions of Honour:

- H.M. Queen Elizabeth II, K.U.O.M. 28.05.92
- H.E. Oscar Luigi Scalfaro, K.U.O.M. 11.10.93

=== Other Honorary Companions of Honour ===
The following notable honorees were appointed Honorary Companions of Honour:

- H.E. Dr Egon Klepsch, K.U.O.M. 25.03.94
- H.E Dr Mário Soares, K.U.O.M. 09.10.94
- H. Emm. Cardinal Angelo Sodano, K.U.O.M. 04.2.95
- H.E. Richard von Weizsäcker, K.U.O.M. 22.10.90
- George Vasiliou

=== Honorary Companions ===
- Mr Ernst-Reinhard Beck, K.O.M. 16.11.07
