= Hyzler =

Hyzler is a Maltese surname of German origin. Notable people with the surname include:

- Albert Hyzler (1916–1993), Maltese politician
- Giuseppe Hyzler (1787–1858), Maltese painter
