= Malta George Cross Fiftieth Anniversary Medal =

- Ribbon bar of the medal
- Type: National Commemorative Medal
- Awarded for: Service during the qualifying period of 10 June 1940—8 September 1943
- Description: Circular cupro-nickel medal
- Presented by: Malta
- Eligibility: Uniformed members of the Allied Armed Forces and Merchant Marine, Maltese Civilians and Boy Scouts
- Established: 17 January 1992

Precedence
- Next (higher): Midalja għall-Qadi tar-Repubblika
- Next (lower): Malta Self-Government Re-introduction Seventy-Fifth Anniversary Medal

The Malta George Cross Fiftieth Anniversary Medal is a commemorative medal created by the government of Malta and awarded by, or in the name of, the President of Malta. Established on 17 January 1992, it could be awarded to individuals who met the specified requirements of service and made application for award of the medal by 15 April 1994. The medal honours the collective award of the George Cross to the island of Malta during World War II.

== Criteria ==
The medal was awarded for service during the qualifying period of 10 June 1940 to 8 September 1943, during and after the Siege of Malta. Three distinct groups were eligible for the medal, uniformed members of the allied armed forces and merchant marine, civilians on Malta who served in specific capacities during the qualifying period, and members of the Scout Association of Malta for service during the qualifying period.

=== Allied armed forces and merchant marine ===
The medal was eligible for presentation to all former uniformed members of the allied armed forces and merchant marine who, at any time during the qualifying period, served in Malta; in air or sea operations in the Mediterranean connected to the defence, relief or supply of Malta, including participation in convoys and convoy escort; or in operations mounted from Malta against the Axis Forces.

British citizens who were awarded the medal are allowed unrestricted permission to wear the medal so long as they are not in Crown Service.

=== Civilians ===
Civilians eligible for the medal were those who, at any time during the qualifying period, were in Malta and served in one of the following capacities: Malta Police Force personnel and Special Constables; Malta Dockyard Police and Malta Dockyard personnel who served with the Dockyard Defence Battery; Nursing members of the Voluntary Aid Detachments, the Red Cross and St John Ambulance, who served in naval, military, or civilian hospitals; Malta Civil Defence personnel; Malta Auxiliary Corps; Malta Volunteer Defence Force or Home Guard; Malta Fire Brigade; and District Commissioners, Regional Protection Officers, and Protection Officers.

Members of the Scout Association of Malta were also eligible for award of the medal for service during the qualifying period.

== Appearance ==
The medal is circular, made of cupronickel and 36 millimetres (1.4 in) in diameter. The obverse depicts the Coat of Arms of Malta with the year 1992 at its base. On the reverse is the George Cross in the centre, surrounded by the words BĦALA XHIEDA TA’ EROIŻMU U DEDIKAZZJONI and TO BEAR WITNESS TO HEROISM AND DEVOTION separated by a Maltese cross at the top and the date 1942 at the base. The medal is held by a straight suspension bar depicting a relief of olive branches and palm fronds meeting in the centre.

The medal is suspended from a blue moire ribbon 32 millimetres (1.3 in) wide with two narrow central vertical stripes of white and red, each 3mm in width.

The medal may also be worn in miniature on appropriate occasions. The miniature of the medal is 18 millimetres (0.71 in) in diameter, and the ribbon 16 millimetres (0.63 in) in width.
