= Joe Grima (politician) =

Maltese politician

Joe Grima (4 February 1936 – 3 February 2017) was a Maltese broadcaster and politician. He was most notable as one of Malta's first television newscasters and as a member of parliament who served in Prime Minister Dom Mintoff's cabinet. Between 1971 and 1976 he was the CEO of the Malta Broadcasting Authority and established Radio Malta.

Grima had a robust career in radio and television before entering politics in 1976 when he won his first election to the Maltese parliament. He later became Industry Minister and Tourism Minister in the 1980s. Grima quit politics in 1992 and returned to professional broadcasting until 2012 when he resigned from One TV.

In 2013 he was appointed Malta's envoy to the World Tourism Organization. In May 2016, he stepped down from this post due to controversial comments he made about London mayor Sadiq Khan.
