= Eddie Fenech Adami =

Maltese prime minister and president (born 1934)

His Excellency Eddie Fenech Adami KUOM GCIH OMRI GCB
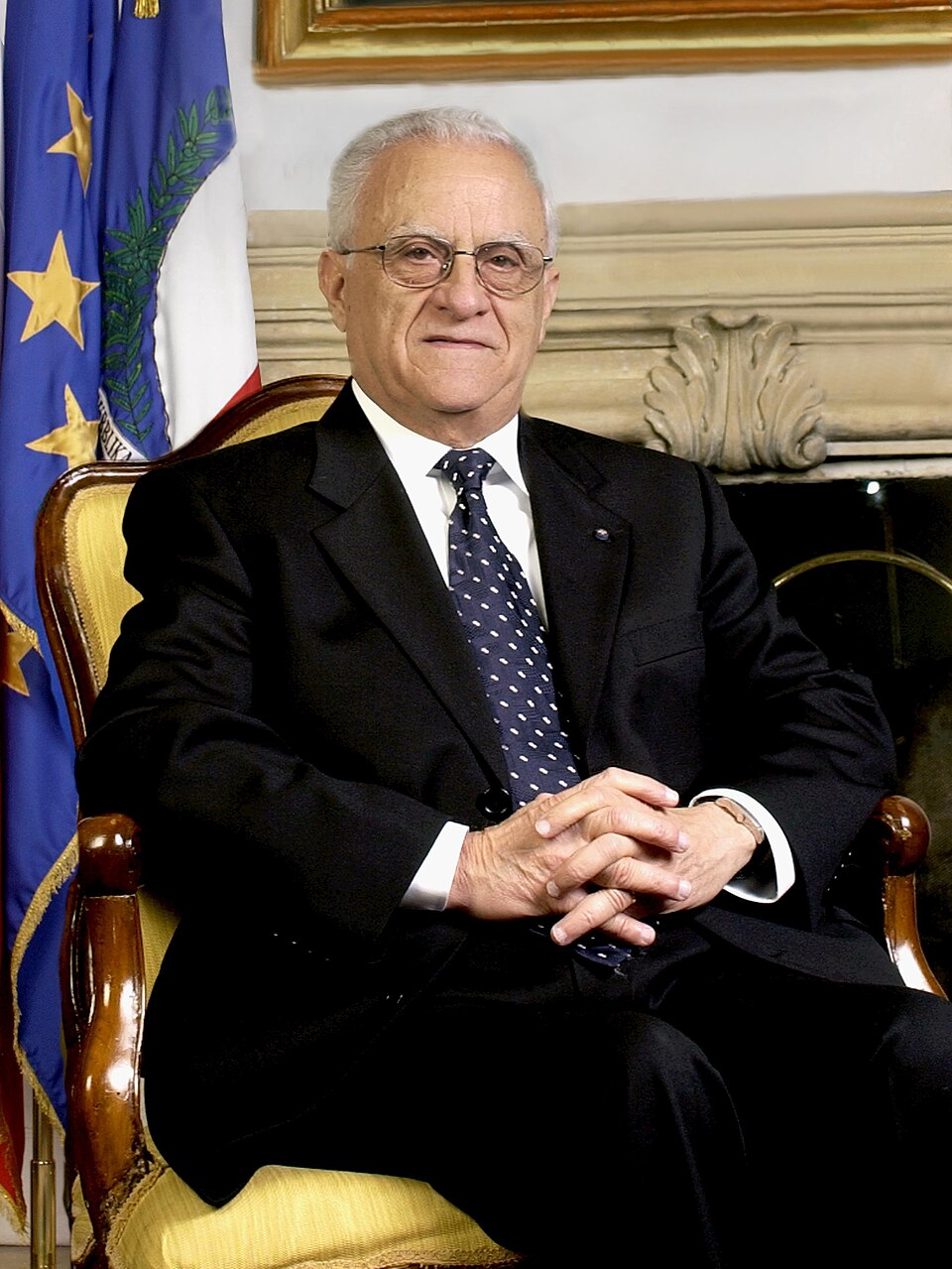
- Official portrait, 2007

7th President of Malta
- In office 4 April 2004 – 4 April 2009
- Prime Minister: Lawrence Gonzi
- Preceded by: Guido de Marco
- Succeeded by: George Abela

10th Prime Minister of Malta
- In office 6 September 1998 – 23 March 2004
- President: Ugo Mifsud Bonnici; Guido de Marco
- Preceded by: Alfred Sant
- Succeeded by: Lawrence Gonzi
- In office 12 May 1987 – 28 October 1996
- President: Paul Xuereb (acting); Ċensu Tabone; Ugo Mifsud Bonnici
- Preceded by: Karmenu Mifsud Bonnici
- Succeeded by: Alfred Sant

Leader of the Opposition
- In office 28 October 1996 – 6 September 1998
- President: Ugo Mifsud Bonnici
- Prime Minister: Alfred Sant
- Preceded by: Alfred Sant
- Succeeded by: Alfred Sant
- In office 11 April 1977 – 12 May 1987
- President: Anton Buttigieg
- Prime Minister: Dom Mintoff; Karmenu Mifsud Bonnici
- Preceded by: Giorgio Borg Olivier
- Succeeded by: Karmenu Mifsud Bonnici

Leader of the Nationalist Party
- In office 11 April 1977 – 3 March 2004
- Preceded by: Giorgio Borg Olivier
- Succeeded by: Lawrence Gonzi

Personal details
- Born: Edoardo Fenech Adami; 7 February 1934 (age 92) Birkirkara, Crown Colony of Malta
- Party: Nationalist
- Spouse: Mary Fenech Adami
- Children: 5 (including Beppe Fenech Adami)
- Education: Royal University of Malta
- Profession: Lawyer
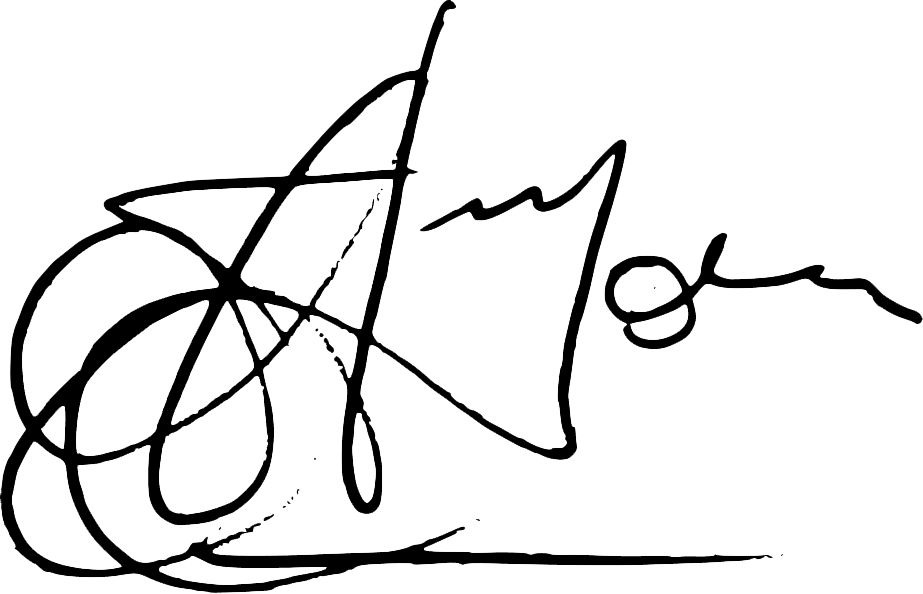
- Signature
- Website: http://eddiefenechadami.org/

Edoardo "Eddie" Fenech Adami KUOM GCIH OMRI GCB (born 7 February 1934) is a Maltese politician and lawyer who served as the prime minister of Malta from 1987 until 1996, and again from 1998 until 2004. Subsequently, he was the seventh president of Malta from 2004 to 2009. He led the Nationalist Party to win four general elections, in 1987, 1992, 1998 and 2003, as well as the majority of votes in 1981. Staunchly pro-European, Fenech Adami was fundamental for Malta's accession to the European Union.

Originally a lawyer, Fenech Adami was co-opted Member of Parliament (MP) in 1969. He served in a number of senior party positions, including president of the Administrative and General Councils, and was elected to succeed Giorgio Borġ Olivier as party leader. From April 1977 onwards, Fenech Adami led the Nationalist opposition in a campaign of civil disobedience against the Mintoff and Mifsud Bonnici administrations of the late seventies and eighties, focusing on a message of respect for democratic principles and human rights.

Upon moving into Auberge de Castille in 1987, Fenech Adami began a policy of national reconciliation, initiating a series of political and economic reforms intended to open up the economy, reverse high unemployment and the islands' problems following sixteen years of socialist policies. His political ideology and economic policies highlighted deregulation, more flexible labour markets, the overhaul of the country's physical infrastructure and the privatisation of state-owned companies. The legal and business structures were also overhauled and trade liberalised. The communications, financial services and banking sectors were deregulated or privatised. Malta also began a period of integration with the EU, formally applying for membership in 1990.

Fenech Adami was re-elected with a modest majority in 1992; his popularity, however, wavered during his second term of office amid further economic reforms, particularly the introduction of VAT, and the re-branding of the main opposition party with a new and more dynamic leader, Alfred Sant. Losing power in 1996, Fenech Adami was returned as prime minister within twenty-two months, after the Labour government's decision to call a snap election backfired. Reversing the unpopular economic policies of the Labour Party, Fenech Adami reactivated Malta's EU membership application and initiated further economic reforms.

He successfully led the pro-EU movement in the 2003 EU membership referendum campaign and won the successive election. He signed Malta's Accession Treaty with the European Union and represented Malta in various EU Summits and Commonwealth meetings.

Fenech Adami resigned as Leader of the Nationalist Party in February 2004, resigning his premiership and giving up his parliamentary seat in March 2004. He became the seventh President of Malta in April 2004.

== Education and professional career ==
Edward (Edoardo) Fenech Adami was born in Birkirkara, British Malta, the son of Josephine Fenech Adami, née Pace, and Luigi Fenech Adami, a customs officer. The fourth boy in a family of five children, his early childhood was marked by the air raids and deprivation in Malta during the Second World War.

He began his education at St Aloysius' College in Birkirkara, continuing his studies there until sitting for his matriculation exams. He attended the Royal University of Malta, studying economics, classics, and then law. He was called to the bar in 1959, and started his career in the law courts. He was married to Mary née Sciberras, who died in 2011. The couple had five children – John, Beppe (a Nationalist MP), Michael (a Nationalist Local Councillor for Birkirkara), Maria and Luigi.

== Early political career ==
Fenech Adami joined the Nationalist Party in the early sixties, first as a constituency official, then as president of the Administrative and General Councils, assistant secretary general, and editor of its newspaper Il-Poplu (English: The People). He contested two unsuccessful campaigns in 1962 and 1966, becoming a Member of Parliament in 1969 following a by-election for the newly vacant seat of Ġorġ Caruana. Prime Minister Borġ Olivier was instrumental in picking Fenech Adami for this co-option to Parliament.

Believing that the Borġ Olivier administration ought to seize the initiative, Fenech Adami pleaded with Borġ Olivier to reshuffle the cabinet, and call early elections in 1970 when the British were negotiating the renewal of the islands' financial and defence agreement. The Nationalist Party was returned to the Opposition in 1971, with the Party's clubs being in the islands' villages and towns being vandalised or destroyed – a trend which continued right up to the late eighties. Fenech Adami served as spokesman for the Opposition on labour relations and social services. His political frailty peaked with his agreement with Mintoff to declare a Maltese republic in 1974, without consulting the electorate; at the time, Guido de Marco called this "an unacceptable act of betrayal." Borġ Olivier's growing weakness led to a successive electoral defeat in 1976. Fenech Adami resisted strongly the Party's proposal to abolish income tax as not being credible. Ultimately, the loss of two successive elections brought about Borġ Olivier's downfall and opened up the Nationalist Party for the choice of a new leader, and modernisation. This only happened following a 1977 Opposition parliamentary group meeting in de Marco's Ħamrun home, which forced Borġ Olivier to accept a designate-leader in his stead.

== Leader of the Nationalist Party ==
A relative newcomer to the Party, Fenech Adami contested the party leadership election against two other established MPs, Ċensu Tabone and de Marco in 1977. Fenech Adami swept the leadership contest in April 1977 with a two-thirds majority; upon his election, Fenech Adami chose to keep his two contenders in highly visible roles. Taking the lead from Borġ Olivier in 1978, Fenech Adami immediately set out to reform the Nationalist Party, adapting to the needs of a more socially aware electorate. This modernisation process attracted a new, and younger party membership.

On 15 October 1979, following hearsay about an attempt on the life of Dom Mintoff, a large group of thugs attacked and burnt down the premises and printing presses of the independent conservative newspaper, The Times of Malta. The thugs proceeded to ransack various Nationalist Party clubs and the private residence of Fenech Adami in Birkirkara. Fenech Adami's neighbours locked themselves in their homes as soon as they heard the commotion. Approaching her house from mass, Mary Fenech Adami was shocked at the mayhem: the front door was wide open, with ten men inside ransacking valuables and stealing heirlooms, smashing glass doors and shutters, hurling books and furniture outside onto the street. The thugs had wooden clubs, which appeared to be solid sawn-off table legs. The six rooms forming the ground floor of the Fenech Adami residence were completely wrecked. Mary Fenech Adami was attacked and slammed against a wall. Her earrings were ripped off, and she was punched on her chest and face. She was then kicked and pushed onto the street. Mary Fenech Adami, her four sons and her mother-in-law only escaped by going up to the third storey of their house and jumping onto a neighbour's house. These incidents marked an escalation of violence in the islands, and came to be known as Black Monday. The attack consolidated Fenech Adami's leadership, with a mass meeting held outside Fenech Adami's residence attracting one of the largest crowds ever, signalling the changing mood in the country.

The Nationalist Party's support grew enough to attract the majority of votes in the controversial 1981 elections, but failed to gain a majority of seats. This was caused by heavily gerrymandered districts, which ensured Labour would retain the Constitutionally required majority of seats in Parliament. The election led to years of bitter struggles against an entrenched Labour government. Fenech Adami led a successful campaign of civil disobedience, boycotting Parliament repeatedly from 1981 to 1983. An upsurge in political violence against the Nationalist Party began, with Fenech Adami pushing for democratic renewal in the nation. The Nationalist Party instructed supporters to boycott government-friendly businesses, bringing prominent Labour supporters to their knees thus forcing Labour to acknowledge the anomalous situation. In March 1983, the Nationalist opposition returned to their seats in Parliament on the basis of starting negotiations to enact constitutional amendments to prevent perverse results in future general elections.

On 30 November 1986, Nationalist Party supporters gathered on the Tal-Barrani road to walk towards Żejtun, where Fenech Adami was to address a mass meeting. This was only allowed after the Party challenged its right to do so in the Constitutional Court. The crowd found that the road to Żejtun was blocked by boulders, poles and burning tyres. A group of Labour supporters, some wearing balaclavas, began to assault the crowd. The situation precipitated with the arrival on site of the police's Special Mobile Unit, which fired tear-gas canisters and rubber bullets on the Nationalist Party supporters. Twenty-three people were injured, with many treated at an improvised emergency clinic at the Party headquarters in Pietà. This incident was followed a month later by the murder of Raymond Caruana, who was killed by a stray bullet fired through the door of a Nationalist Party club in Gudja by unknown Labour activists. In Parliament, Fenech Adami used his allotted Budget reply to denounce the crime, and the subsequent arrest of Pietru Pawl Busuttil, who was a Nationalist Party activist framed for the murder by the police. Fenech Adami held that the Budget was irrelevant for the Maltese people, in that the defence of liberty and democracy is what the Maltese people shall vote for. The parliamentary session and Fenech Adami's speech were interrupted by animated Labour MPs, led by ministers Wistin Abela and Lorry Sant, who almost assaulted him.

== Prime Minister (1987–1996) ==
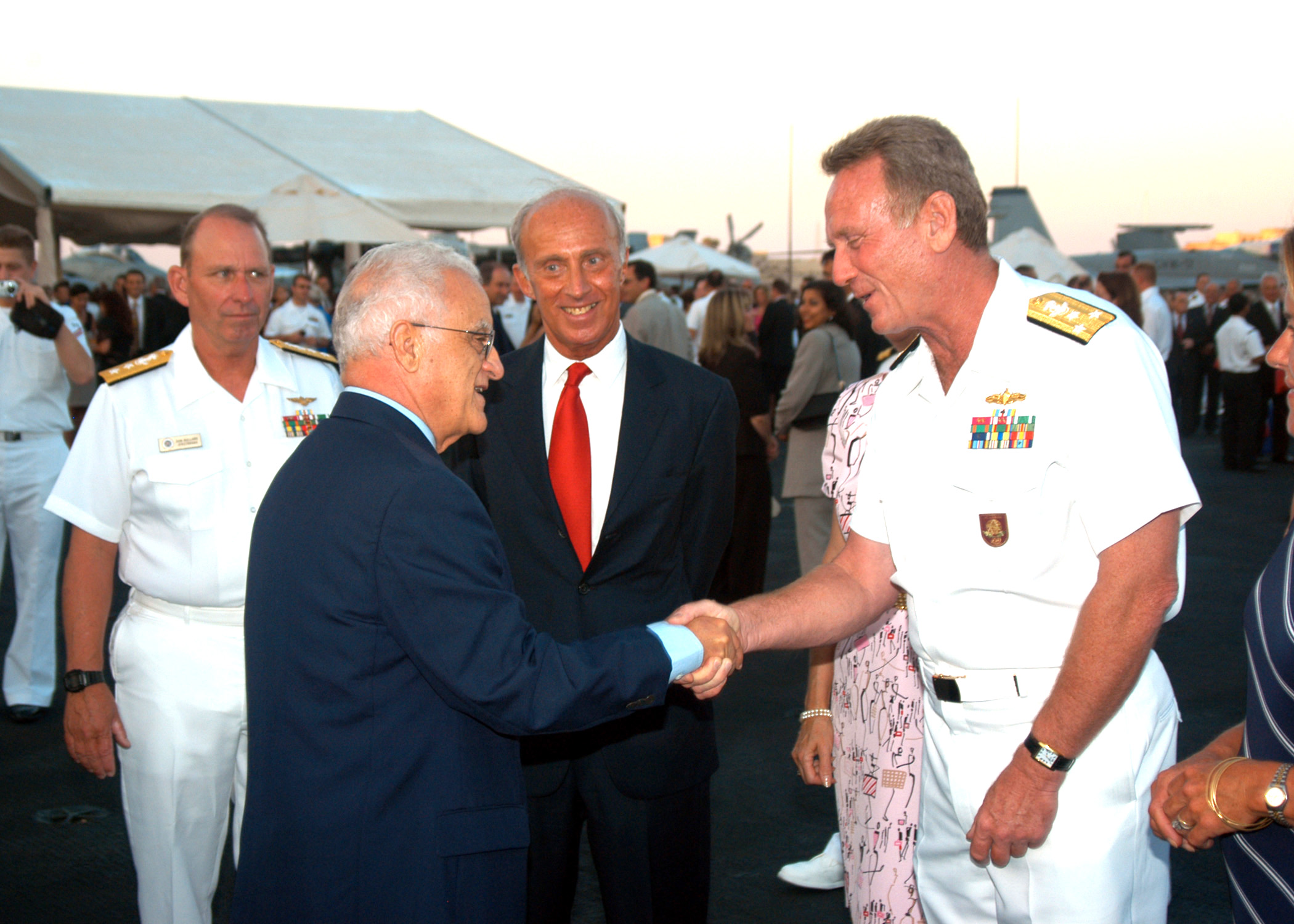
Edward Fenech Adami aboard the aircraft carrier USS John F. Kennedy (CV 67), 28 June 2004

Following a set of constitutional changes, the party winning an absolute majority of votes would be guaranteed a parliamentary majority. In 1987, following a two-month-long campaign and thousands of workers employed with governmental agencies, parastatal and state-owned enterprises, the Nationalist Party won the general elections with a majority of 5,000 votes.

Between 1987 and 1992, Fenech Adami ushered a major period of change in Malta. Foreign relations were expanded, with Malta starting its transition towards a modern European democracy. Under Fenech Adami, the islands steered a more pro-Western course. Malta maintained its economic and political ties with Libya, diplomatic ties it built under the socialist administration, but the friendship treaty between the two countries was renegotiated. Fenech Adami widened Malta's political distance with Gaddafi, eliminating military obligations on both sides. Fenech Adami also severed Malta's air links with Libya, and honoured the UN embargo on the country.

The country's physical infrastructure was completely overhauled, with many roads reconstructed, a new airport, reverse osmosis plants and power station built, as well as the removal of import licenses and quotas. Telecommunications, financial services and the banking sectors were deregulated or privatised. By the early nineties, Fenech Adami started to direct his economic and governmental policies to integrate Malta into the European Economic Community. This included the gradual removal of local import and customs duties. As prime minister he asked for a number of presidential pardons including one for Joseph Fenech, who was a well known criminal. The pardon was proffered on the basis of Joseph Fenech acting as a star witness in a trial for the attempted murder of Richard Cachia Caruana, then personal assistant to prime minister Fenech Adami.

Fenech Adami was reconfirmed as Prime Minister in the February 1992 elections, with a modest majority. The gradual decrease in income taxes, and the reduction in levies on trade with EEC countries led to a worrying decrease in government revenues. In order to ensure sustainable public finances, the Nationalist government introduced a value-added tax (VAT) to counterbalance the loss in tariff income. VAT proved to be very unpopular, with the new leader of the Labour Party, Alfred Sant, riding a wave of popular dissatisfaction at the pace and depth of the reforms intended to allow Malta to join the European Union. Disgruntled businesses, vocal minority groups (such as hunters and trappers) and the newly found dynamism of the Labour Party led to the loss of the 1996 general elections, with the Nationalist Party gaining only 47.8% of cast votes.

== Leader of the Opposition (1996–1998) ==
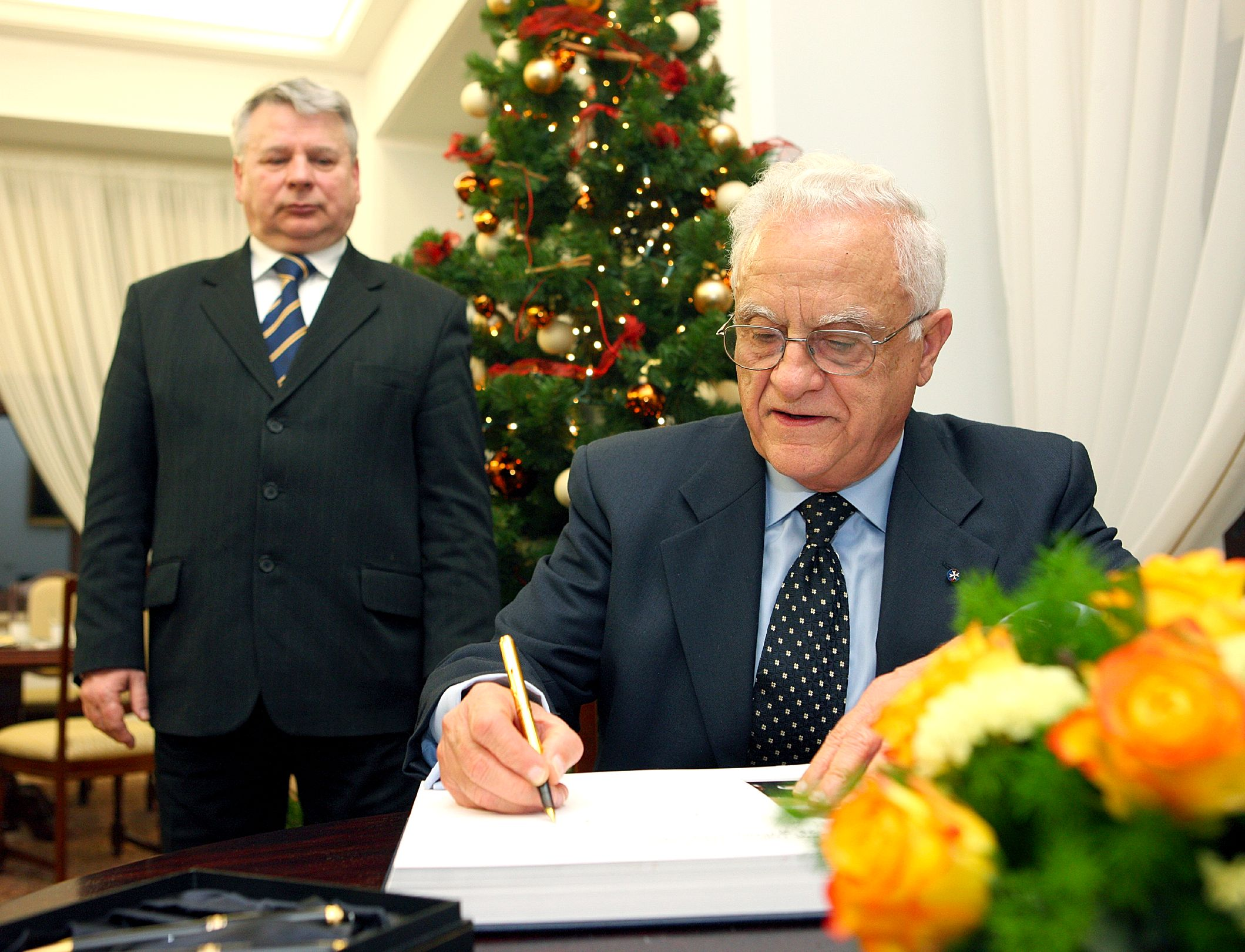
President Fenech Adami in the Polish Senate, 26 January 2009

Between 1996 and 1998, Fenech Adami served as Leader of the Opposition. The Labour government held a one-seat majority, which led to a period of severe political instability. Labour introduced several economic policies, fulfilling its pledge to remove VAT by replacing it with a complex customs and excise tax system (CET), the introduction of further taxes to counter the shortfall in revenues, and increased utility bills. The delicate situation, which saw the resignation of the finance minister, and other prominent members of the party and government, was further complicated with the actions of Dom Mintoff.

The latter, who was a backbencher in the Sant government, rose against his own government. Unable to contain Mintoff's protests against the austere 1997 Budget, and a waterfront redevelopment project in Cottonera, the Labour government called snap elections. Fenech Adami reclaimed the floating vote, winning a 13,000 vote majority, with his Party returned to office in September 1998.

== Prime Minister (1998–2004) ==
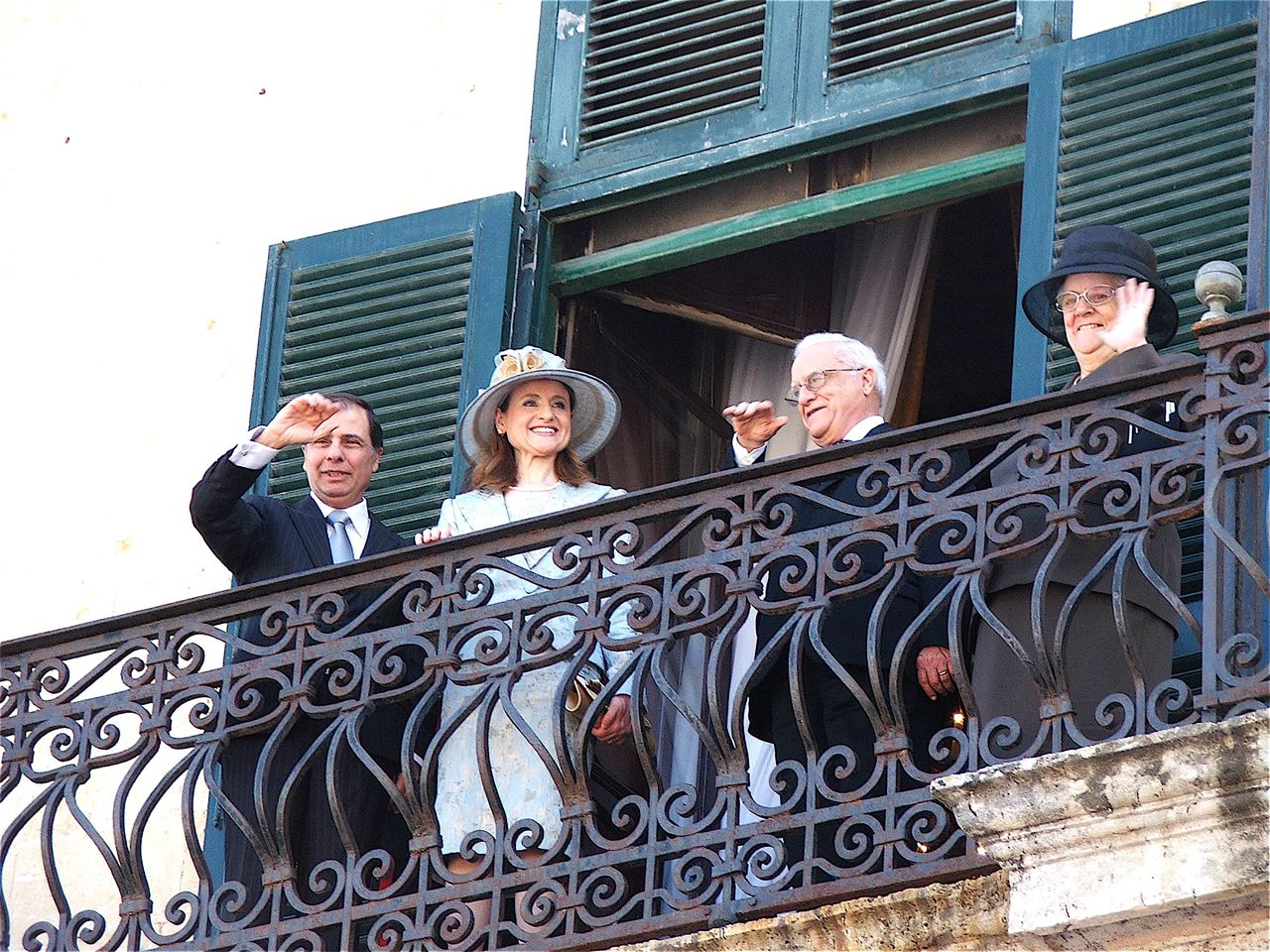
Fenech Adami saluting the crowd in St. George's Square on the day his successor, George Abela was sworn in.

Malta's European Union application, which was put on hold by the previous Labour government, was reactivated and negotiations were concluded by December 2002. Fenech Adami successfully led the pro-EU movement in the 2003 EU membership referendum campaign, and won the successive election. He signed Malta's Accession Treaty with the European Union on 16 April 2003, and represented Malta in various EU Summits and Commonwealth meetings. In December 2003, he received the European of the Year 2003 Award from the influential Brussels-based newspaper European Voice in recognition of his unfaltering efforts to bring Malta into the European Union. Fenech Adami resigned as Leader of the Nationalist Party in February 2004, resigning his premiership and giving up his parliamentary seat on 23 March 2004, thus becoming the longest serving Prime Minister since Malta's independence.

== President of Malta ==
Following his resignation as Prime Minister, Fenech Adami was appointed President of Malta on 4 April 2004. He served a five-year term, leaving office on 4 April 2009, when he was succeeded by George Abela.

== Honours ==
=== Maltese honours ===
- Companion of Honour of the National Order of Merit (1990) by right as a Prime Minister, later President of Malta

=== Foreign honours ===
- Grand-Cross of the Order of Prince Henry, Portugal (09.11.1994)
- Commander Grand-Cross of the Order of the Three Stars, Latvia (2004)
- Grand Cross with Chain of the Order of the Star of Romania (2004)
- Knight Grand-Cross with Grand Cordon of the Order of Merit of the Italian Republic (2005)
- Honorary Knight Grand-Cross of the Order of the Bath, United Kingdom (2005)
- Grand-Cross of the Grand Order of King Tomislav, Croatia (2006)
- Grand Cross with Chain of the Order of Merit of Hungary (2007)
- Grand-Collar of the Order of Prince Henry, Portugal (11.12.2008)
- Knight of the Order of the White Eagle, Poland (2009)
- Commander of the National Order of the Legion of Honour, France (2010)

=== Other ===
Fenech Adami is an Honorary Member of the International Raoul Wallenberg Foundation.

== See also ==
- List of prime ministers of Malta

Political offices
Preceded by Karmenu Mifsud Bonnici	Prime Minister of Malta; 1987–1996	Succeeded by Alfred Sant
Preceded by Alfred Sant	Prime Minister of Malta; 1998–2004	Succeeded by Lawrence Gonzi
Preceded by Guido de Marco	President of Malta; 2004–2009	Succeeded by George Abela
Party political offices
Preceded by Giorgio Borg Olivier	Leader of the Nationalist Party of Malta; 1977–2004	Succeeded by Lawrence Gonzi
Preceded by Ċensu Tabone	President of the Nationalist Party of Malta; 1975–1977	Succeeded by Ugo Mifsud Bonnici
