= Ċensu Tabone =

President of Malta from 1989 to 1994

His Excellency Ċensu Tabone KUOM
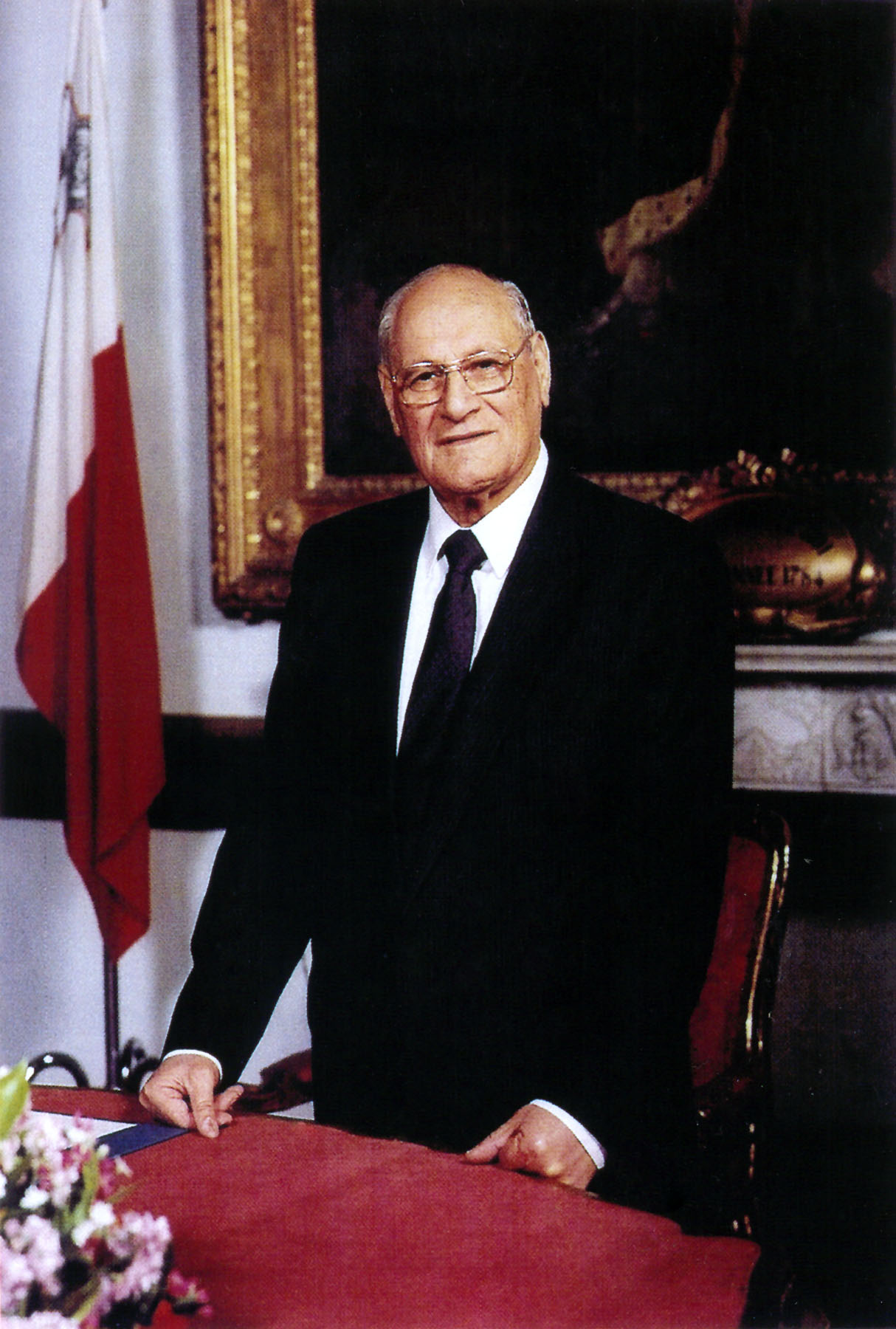
- Official portrait

4th President of Malta
- In office 4 April 1989 – 4 April 1994
- Prime Minister: Eddie Fenech Adami
- Preceded by: Paul Xuereb (Acting); Agatha Barbara
- Succeeded by: Ugo Mifsud Bonnici

Personal details
- Born: Vincent Tabone; 30 March 1913 Victoria, Gozo, British Malta
- Died: 14 March 2012 (aged 98) St. Julian's, Malta
- Resting place: Santa Maria Cemetery, Victoria, Gozo
- Party: Nationalist Party
- Spouse: Maria Wirth (1941–2012; his death)
- Children: 8

Vincent "Ċensu" Tabone, KUOM (Maltese pronunciation: [ˈt͡ʃɛnsʊ tɐˈbɔːnɛ]; 30 March 1913 – 14 March 2012) was the fourth president of Malta who also served as Minister and Nationalist MP.

== Early years ==
Vincent Tabone was the son of Niccolò and Elisa Tabone, the youngest of ten children. His paternal grandmother, Giuseppina De Gaetani, had settled in Valletta in the mid-19th century from Riposto, Sicily. His father, Niccolò, was one of the first Maltese doctors to read pathology and surgery in the United Kingdom, and served as a District Medical Officer in various parts of Gozo. Life on Gozo for the Tabone family was relatively quiet and pastoral. They lived in Victoria and spent their summers in Marsalforn.

Tabone's childhood was deeply affected by the sudden death of his father in 1922 at the age of 59. Two years later, at the age of 11, he was shipped off to Malta, where he became a boarder at St. Aloysius College, a Jesuit school. He entered the University of Malta in 1930, where he graduated as a pharmacist in 1933 and as a Doctor of Medicine in 1937.

== Military service and medical career ==
During World War II, he served as a Regimental Medical Officer and general duty officer with the Royal Malta Artillery, and later as trainee ophthalmic specialist stationed at the Military Hospital, Mtarfa. In the early days of the War, he narrowly escaped tragedy when a bomb fell at Fort Saint Elmo, demolishing a substantial part of the army barracks to which he had been posted. In 1946, he obtained a diploma in Ophthalmology from the University of Oxford, followed by a diploma in Ophthalmic Medicine and Surgery from the Royal College of Surgeons of England. He was a clinical assistant at Moorfields Eye Hospital in London.

In 1948, Tabone was entrusted with the supervision of a campaign to treat trachoma using sulfonamide tablets and drops. Through his efforts, the disease was virtually eliminated from the Island of Gozo. He helped launch similar campaigns in Taiwan, Indonesia and Iraq under the auspices of the World Health Organization, and subsequently served as a member and consultant of the WHO's International Panel of Trachoma Experts.

He served on the Council of the University of Malta, and between 1957 and 1960 he was a faculty member of the Board of Medicine, and a lecturer in Clinical Ophthalmology in the Department of Surgery. He helped found the Medical Association of Malta in 1954 and was for a time its Honorary President. For many years, even as he served as a Member of Parliament, he maintained his medical practice in Sliema.

== Political career ==
Tabone was elected to the executive committee of the Nationalist Party in 1961. He later served as the party's Secretary-General (1962–1972) and as Deputy Leader (1972–1977). Tabone was first elected to Parliament in 1966 and subsequently served as a Member of Parliament for the Sliema, St. Julian's, Msida, and Gżira areas for 23 years. During this time, he also served as the Minister of Labour, Employment and Welfare (1966–1971) and Minister for Foreign Affairs (1987–1989). In 1968, Tabone brought a motion before the United Nations calling for an action plan in regard to the world's ageing population. In 1988, he brought another motion before the UN, calling for the world's climate to be declared the common heritage of mankind.

== Death ==
On 14 March 2012, Tabone died at his home in St. Julian's, Malta at age 98. He died 16 days shy of his 99th birthday.

== Personal life ==
On 23 November 1941, Tabone married Maria Wirth (9 February 1920 – 19 July 2018). He was survived by his wife, eight children, 19 grandchildren and 24 great-grandchildren. Ċensu and Maria Tabone had celebrated their 70th wedding anniversary not long before his death.

== Honours ==
=== National honours ===
- Malta: Companion of Honour of the National Order of Merit (1990) by right as a President of Malta

=== Foreign honours ===
- Germany: Grand Cross of the Order of Merit of the Federal Republic of Germany

Political offices
| Preceded by Paul Xuereb (acting) | President of Malta; 1989–1994 | Succeeded by Ugo Mifsud Bonnici |
