= Giovanni Felice =

Maltese politician

The Honourable Giovanni Felice LLD

Minister of Finance
- In office 7 April 1966 – 10 March 1971
- President: Anthony Mamo; Anton Buttiġieġ
- Prime Minister: Giorgio Borġ Olivier

Minister of Industry and Tourism
- In office 1962–1966
- Prime Minister: Giorgio Borġ Olivier

Minister of Justice
- In office 1953–1955
- Prime Minister: Giorgio Borġ Olivier

Personal details
- Born: 21 January 1899 Sliema, Malta
- Died: 16 March 1977 (aged 78) Sliema, Malta
- Party: Nationalist Party
- Spouse: Martez née Dacoutros
- Children: Grace, Mario, Anton, and Alfred.

Giovanni Felice (Sliema 21 January 1899 – Sliema 16 March 1977) was a Maltese politician. He was appointed Minister of Justice from 1953 to 1955, Minister of Industry and Tourism from 1962 to 1966, and Finance Minister from 1966 to 1971 in the Giorgio Borġ Olivier cabinet.

== Early life ==
=== Family ===
Giovanni Felice was born in Sliema, and spent the rest of his life living there.

=== Education ===
Felice studied at the Royal University of Malta, graduating with a degree in law on 4 October 1922. He continued his studies in Criminology and International Law at Sapienza University of Rome. Upon his return to Malta, he practiced as a lawyer for several years while serving as an examiner in International Law. Felice was president of the "Guild of Graduates" and also "Sliema Band Club".

== Personal life ==
Giovanni Felice married Martez (née Dacoutros) and they had four children: Grace, Mario, Anton, and Alfred.

== Political career ==
In the early 1950s, Felice was invited to enter politics with the Nationalist Party. In 1953, he served as a member of the Opposition. In 1954, he was appointed Minister of Justice. In the following years, he served as the Minister of Industrial Development and Tourism as well as Minister for Finance, Customs and Port. He retired from politics in 1971.

Felice was a member of the Maltese delegation at the "Round Table Conference" in September 1955. He was a leading figure during crucial talks with some high-profile British government representatives at Marlborough House in London and participated actively in various other conferences. These talks led finally to Maltese Independence on 21 September 1964. Felice, as Minister of Finance was responsible for founding the Central Bank of Malta. On the 25th anniversary of the establishment of the Central Bank of Malta, a silver coin was minted depicting Felice.

== Death and state-funeral ==
His funeral, in March 1977, was attended by many of his Sliema constituents together with Members of the Nationalist Party, the Malta Labour Party, and president Dr. Anton Buttigieg. He was the epitome of honesty, sincerity, and loyalty to his party. Felice was mentioned by Hon. Guido de Marco in his last speech as a man of great culture and knowledge.
