= Paul Xuereb =

Maltese politician (1923–1994)

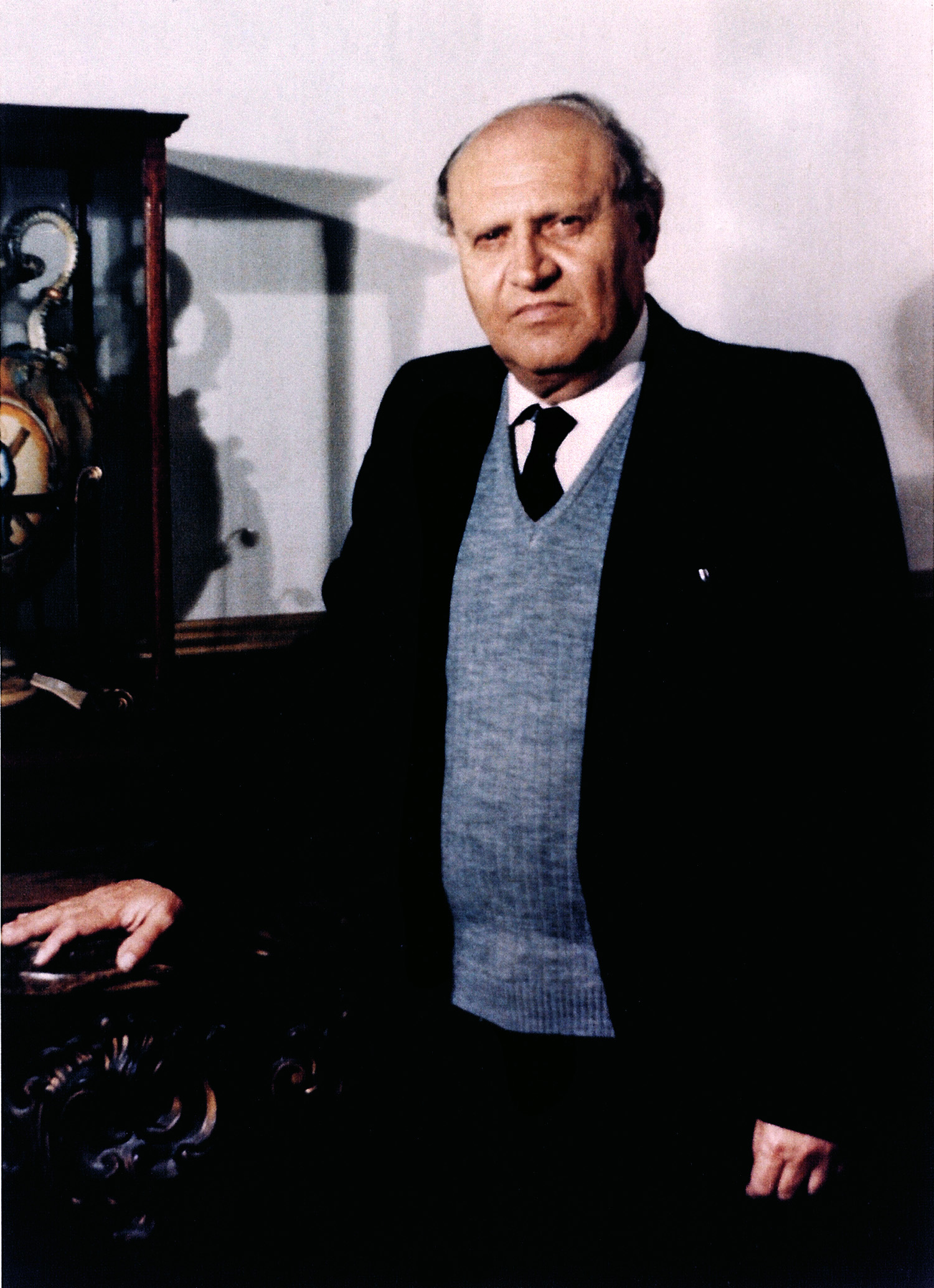

Acting President of Malta
- In office 16 February 1987 – 4 April 1989
- Prime Minister: Karmenu Mifsud Bonnici; Eddie Fenech Adami
- Preceded by: Agatha Barbara
- Succeeded by: Ċensu Tabone

Personal details
- Born: Pawlu Xuereb; 21 July 1923 Rabat, Malta
- Died: 6 September 1994 (aged 71) Malta

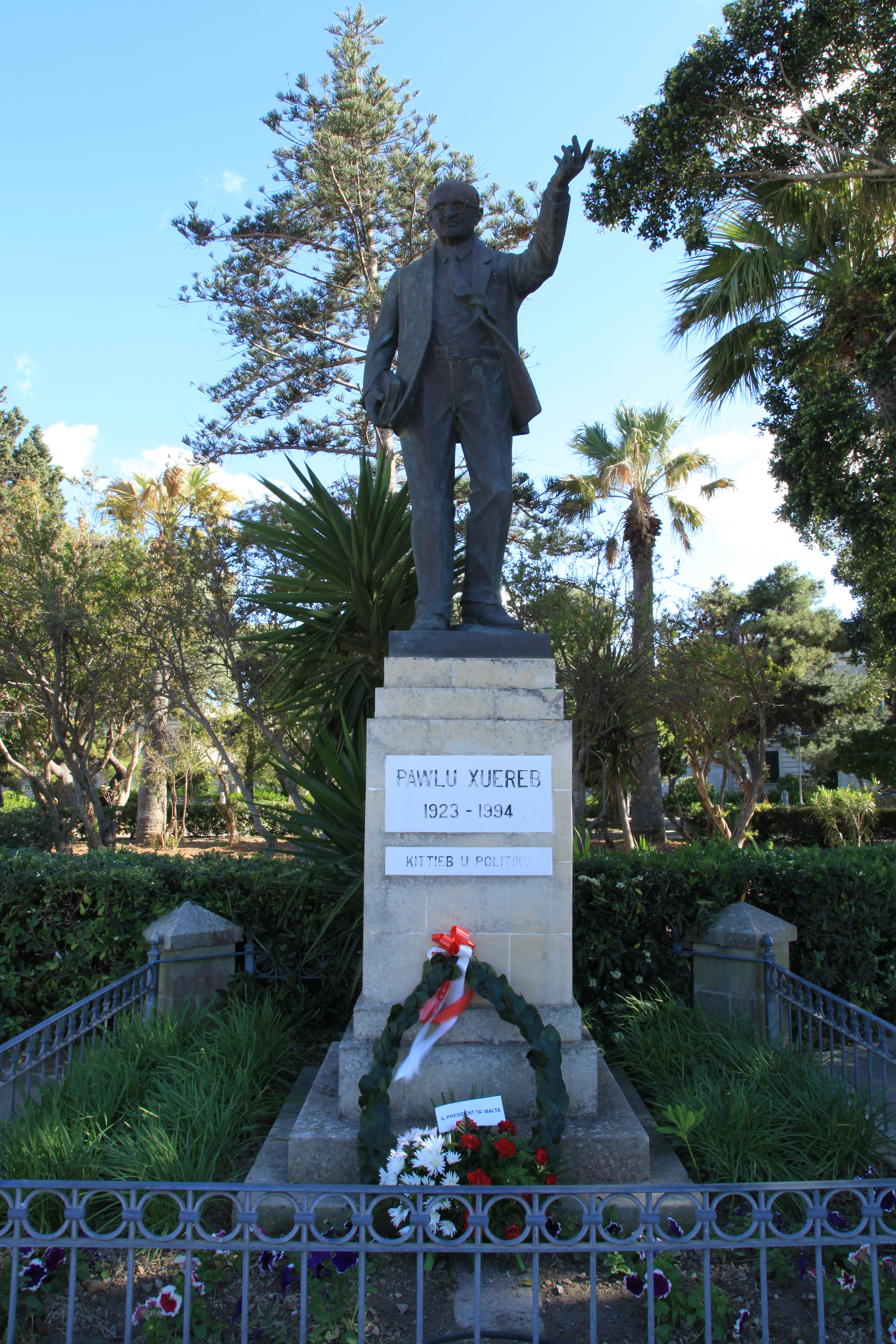
Memorial to Paul Xuereb

Pawlu "Paul" Xuereb (21 July 1923 – 6 September 1994) was a Maltese politician who served as the Speaker of the House of Representatives of Malta from July 1986 to February 1987 and the acting president of Malta from February 1987 to April 1989.

He was educated at the Regent Street Polytechnic in London, where he studied journalism, Political Economy and Political Science. Upon completing his studies he returned to Malta in 1950 and took up the post of managing director of Fardex Trade Development Company (Malta) Ltd. In 1958 he joined the Department of Education as a visiting Master at the Lyceum. In 1959 Xuereb joined the Freedom Press as Literary Editor and Assistant Editor of the Malta Labour Party organ The Voice of Malta until 1964 when he was appointed General Manager of the Party publishing house. He entered politics in 1962, and contested the general election of that year when he was elected as Member of Parliament keeping his seat in the 1966, 1971, 1976 and 1981 elections. He was a Cabinet Minister between 1971 and 1976.

Xuereb was appointed by the Prime Minister as the Acting President of the Republic, following the end of term of Office of the third President, Agatha Barbara. Xuereb took the Oath of Office on 16 February 1987. A bronze statue designed by late sculptor Anton Agius was erected within Howards' Gardens, just outside the Bastions of Mdina in Paul Xuereb's honour.

Political offices
Preceded by Agatha Barbara	President of Malta; 1987–1989 (acting)	Succeeded by Ċensu Tabone
