= Dom Mintoff =

Prime Minister of Malta (1955–1958, 1971–1984)

The Honourable Dom Mintoff KUOM
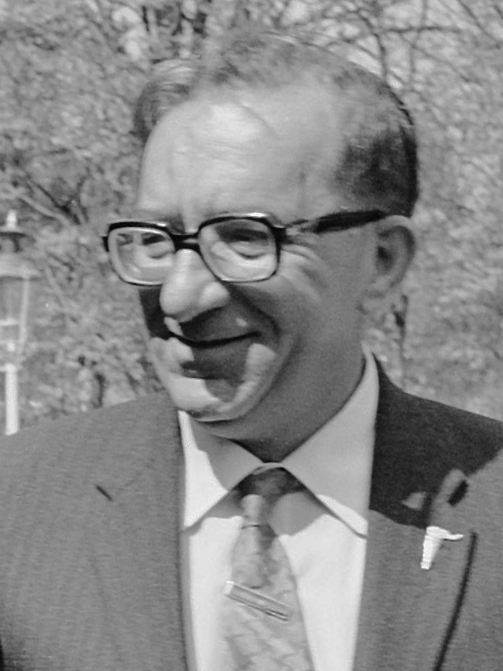
- Mintoff in 1974

8th Prime Minister of Malta
- In office 21 June 1971 – 22 December 1984
- Monarch: Elizabeth II
- President: Sir Anthony Mamo; Anton Buttigieg; Albert Hyzler (Acting); Agatha Barbara
- Governors-General: Sir Maurice Henry Dorman; Sir Anthony Mamo
- Preceded by: Giorgio Borg Olivier
- Succeeded by: Karmenu Mifsud Bonnici
- In office 11 March 1955 – 26 April 1958
- Monarch: Elizabeth II
- Governor: Sir Robert Laycock
- Preceded by: Giorgio Borg Olivier
- Succeeded by: George Borg Olivier (1962)

4th Leader of the Malta Labour Party
- In office 16 October 1949 – 22 December 1984
- Preceded by: Sir Paul Boffa
- Succeeded by: Karmenu Mifsud Bonnici

Personal details
- Born: 6 August 1916 Cospicua, Colony of Malta
- Died: 20 August 2012 (aged 96) Tarxien, Malta
- Resting place: Addolorata Cemetery
- Party: Labour Party
- Spouse: Moyra de Vere Bentinck (m. 1947; died 1997)
- Children: Anne; Yana
- Education: De La Salle College (Malta); Archbishop's Seminary
- Alma mater: University of Malta; B.Sc, B.E. & A. Hertford College; M.A. (Oxon)
- Occupation: Politician, architect, civil engineer
- Awards: Rhodes Scholarship; Companion of Honour of the National Order of Merit; Malta Self-Government Re-introduction Seventy-Fifth Anniversary Medal; Malta Independence Fiftieth Anniversary Medal; Order of the Republic of Libya; Grand Cordon of the Order of the Republic of Tunisia; Grand Cordon of the Order of Ouissam Alaouite; Al-Gaddafi International Prize for Human Rights

Dominic Mintoff KUOM (Maltese: Duminku Mintoff [dʊˈmɪnkʊ ˈmɪntɔf]; often called il-Perit, "the Architect"; 6 August 1916 – 20 August 2012) was a Maltese socialist politician, architect and civil engineer who was leader of the Labour Party from 1949 to 1984, and was Prime Minister of Malta from 1955 to 1958, when Malta was still a British colony, and again, following independence, from 1971 to 1984. His tenure as Prime Minister saw the creation of a comprehensive welfare state, nationalisation of large corporations, a substantial increase in the general standard of living and the establishment of the Maltese republic, though was later marred by a degree of economic stagnation, accusations of authoritarian practices and outbreaks of political violence.

== Early life and education ==
Mintoff was born on 6 August 1916, the third-born and eldest male sibling of nine, to Lawrence (or Laurence) "Wenzu" Mintoff (who hailed from an old Gozitan family) and his wife, Concetta Farrugia (known in Maltese as Ċetta tax-Xiħ). He was baptised the next day in his hometown Bormla in the Sanctuary of the Immaculate Conception. His father was a local cook employed by the British Royal Navy and his mother was reputed to have been a pawn broker or money lender. He attended a seminary but did not join the priesthood. One of his brothers did become a priest, however, and one of his sisters became a nun. Dom enrolled at the University of Malta. He graduated with a Bachelor of Science and, later, as an architect and civil engineer (1937). That same year he was awarded a Rhodes Scholarship and pursued his studies at Hertford College, Oxford, where he earned a master's degree in engineering science in 1939.

== Political career (1935–1998) ==
=== Early political career (1935–1949) ===
After serving as the assistant secretary of Bormla Labour Party club from the age of 19, Mintoff was served as Labour's Secretary General from 1935 till 1939 and from 1944 till 1945, resigning from 1939-1944 to pursue his studies at the University of Oxford.

He was first elected to public office in 1945 to the Government Council. In the same year, Mintoff was elected Deputy Leader of the Party with a wide margin that placed him in an indisputable position as the successor, if not a challenger, to party leader Paul Boffa. After Labour's victory at the polls in 1947, he was appointed Deputy Prime Minister and Minister of Public Works and Reconstruction, overseeing large post-War public projects.

=== Leader of the Labour Party (1949–1984) ===
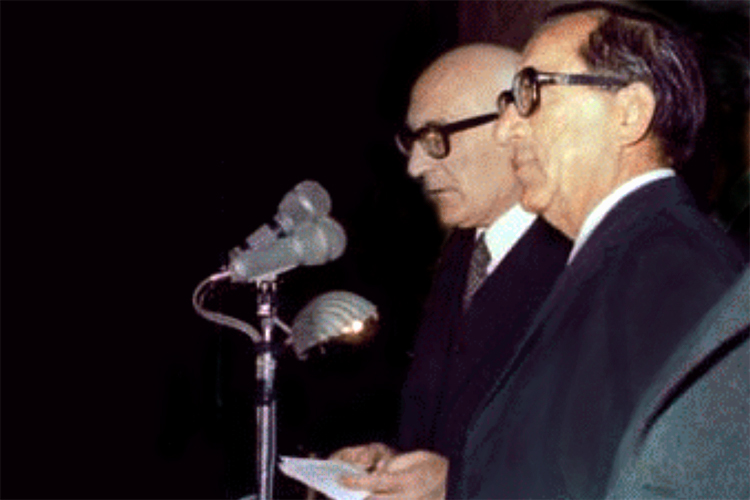
Proclamation of the Republic of Malta, 13 December 1974; President Sir Anthony Mamo and Prime Minister Dom Mintoff

==== First two mandates ====
Mintoff's strong position and ambition led to a series of Cabinet crises. A split in the Labour Party came about when Boffa, who was ready for compromise and moderation with the colonial authorities, resigned and formed the Malta Workers Party. Mintoff refounded the Labour Party as the "Malta Labour Party" of which he assumed leadership. Despite Mintoff's faction retaining the overwhelming majority of party members, the split resulted in the weakening of both parties and it was not until 1955 after remaining out of government for three consecutive legislatures, that the Labour Party was elected to office with Mintoff as Prime Minister.

This government's main political platform, integration with the UK, led to a deterioration of the Party's relations with the Catholic Church, leading to the interdiction of all party supporters by the Church, with voting Labour being declared a mortal sin. This led to all voters who braved social marginalisation to defy the Church's demands to be termed "Soldiers of Steel" (Maltese: Suldati tal-Azzar). The Labour Party lost the subsequent two elections in 1962 and 1966 due to the influence of the clerical prohibition on the deeply religious Maltese population, and boycotted the Independence Day celebrations in 1964 due to wide-ranging disagreements with the substantial amount of power retained by the British government.

Following the lifting of the interdiction and the improvement of relations with the Catholic Church in 1969, Dom Mintoff was elected as Prime Minister in the 1971 general election and immediately set out to re-negotiate the post-Independence military and financial agreements with the United Kingdom.

The government undertook socialist-style nationalisation programmes, import substitution schemes, and the expansion of the public sector, the collective sector and the welfare state. Employment laws were revised with gender equality being introduced in salary pay. In the case of civil law, civil (non-religious) marriage was introduced, and sodomy, homosexuality and adultery were legalised. Through a package of constitutional reforms agreed to with the opposition party, Malta declared itself a republic in 1974. In 1975, Mintoff ordered that the Royal cyphers be ground off Maltese pillar boxes. However, when it was pointed out to him that this defacement was similar to what Napoleon Bonaparte did to the coats of arms on buildings of the Knights Hospitaller, he ordered that the programme be stopped. In 1979, the last British troops left Malta in accordance with the 1972 agreement.

==== Social and political troubles in the 1980s ====
The Labour Party was confirmed in office in the 1976 elections. In 1981, amid allegations of gerrymandering, the Party managed to hold on to a parliamentary majority, even though the opposition Nationalist Party managed an absolute majority of votes. A serious political crisis ensued when Nationalist MPs refused to accept the electoral result and also refused to take their seats in parliament for the first years of the legislature. Mintoff called this action "perverse" but it was not an uncommon one in any parliamentary democracy with disputed election results. He proposed to his parliamentary group that fresh elections be held, but most members of his Parliamentary group rejected his proposal as it was likely that the prior result would be repeated. Mintoff stayed on as prime minister until 1984, during which time he suspended the work of the Constitutional Court during discussions with the Opposition to amend the Constitution. He resigned as Prime Minister and Party leader aged 68 in 1984 (although he retained his parliamentary seat and substantial influence over the party), opening the way for his deputy prime minister, Karmenu Mifsud Bonnici, to succeed him.

For the 1981 elections, the opposition Nationalist Party, reinvigorated with a new leader and backed by various Conservative and Christian Democratic parties in Western Europe, looked set for a serious challenge to Mintoff. In fact, in that election, the Partit Nazzjonalista managed an absolute majority of votes, but managed only 31 seats to the Malta Labour Party's 34. Mintoff said that he would not be ready to govern in such conditions and hinted that he would call for fresh elections within six months. However, pressure from party members forced Mintoff to do otherwise: Mintoff eventually accepted the President's invitation to form a government. This led to a political crisis whose effects continued through much of the 1980s characterised by mass civil disobedience and protests led by Opposition Leader Eddie Fenech Adami as well as increasing political violence, such as Black Monday.

=== Labour backbencher (1984–1998) ===
Mintoff resigned as Prime Minister and Leader of the Labour Party in 1984, while retaining his parliamentary seat and remaining a government backbencher. He was succeeded by Karmenu Mifsud Bonnici. Mintoff was instrumental in convincing his parliamentary colleagues to support constitutional amendments ensuring a parliamentary majority for the party achieving an absolute majority of votes. A repeat of 1981 was thus avoided, and the Nationalist Party went on to win the 1987 elections. The Labour Party went into opposition for the first time in sixteen years.

He successfully contested the 1992 and 1996 elections. However, a rift grew between Mintoff, representing the party's old-guard, and Alfred Sant, the new Labour Leader. Things came to a head in 1998 when the Labour government was negotiating the lease of sealine to be developed in a yacht marina in Birgu. Mintoff eventually voted against the government's motion which was defeated. The Prime Minister saw this as a loss of confidence and the president, acting on Prime Minister Sant's advice dissolved Parliament and elections were held. This was the first time, since the war, that Mintoff's name was not on the ballot paper and the Malta Labour Party lost heavily.

=== Foreign policy ===
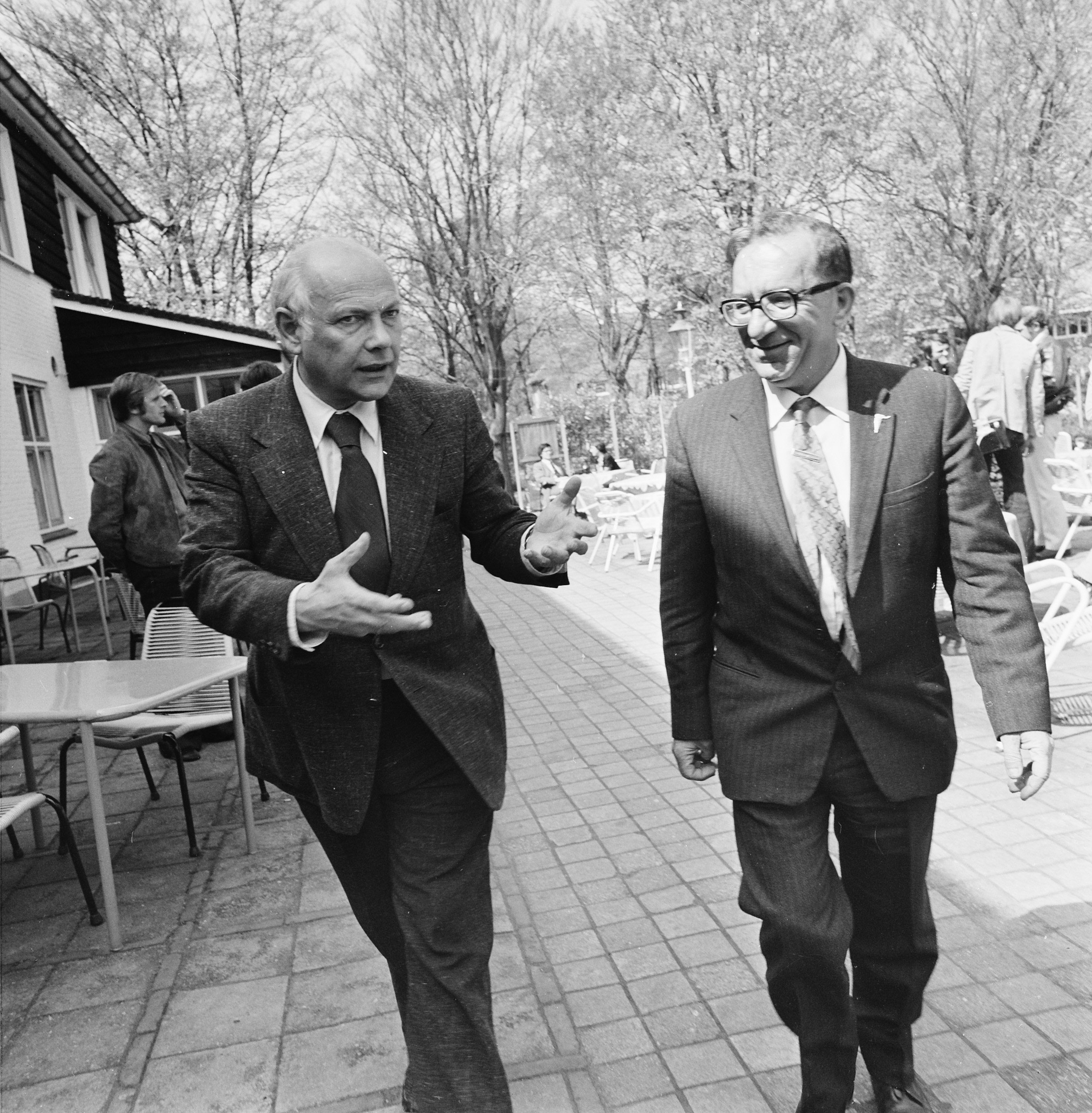
Mintoff with Dutch premier Joop den Uyl in the Hague in 1974

After Mintoff's initial attempts at integration with Great Britain proved unsuccessful, he resigned in 1958 and became a strident advocate of decolonisation and anti-imperialism. Returning to office in 1971, he immediately set about renegotiating Malta's defence agreement with Britain. The difficult negotiations with Britain, which later resulted in the departure of British forces in 1979 and the attendant losses in rent, were coupled with a policy of Cold War brinkmanship which saw Mintoff seek to play rivals off each other and look increasingly east and south, courting Mao Zedong, Kim Il Sung, Nicolae Ceaușescu and Muammar Gaddafi.

Recently declassified CIA reports show the United States' fears that a Mintoff-led government in Malta could see the country fall under the Soviet sphere of influence, leading to an alleged planned US coup d'etat not unlike that which befell Salvador Allende. Mintoff opposed Malta's EU and Eurozone membership on the concern for Malta's status as a constitutionally neutral country and fears over the transformation of the EU into tool of US Imperialism.

== Post-retirement (1998–2012) ==
Immediately after his retirement from parliamentary politics, Mintoff's involvement in public life was only occasional due to bouts of ill health. He emerged in the referendum campaign on Malta's membership to the EU, founding the Malta Arise Front (Maltese: Front Maltin Inqumu) alongside former prime-minister Karmenu Mifsud Bonnici and militant trade-unionist Sammy Meilaq. With the resignation of Labour leader Alfred Sant in 2008, rapprochement with Labour was made after making brief appearances during the leadership race between George Abela and Joseph Muscat. Relations between Mintoff and the party were finally restored under Muscat's leadership with Mintoff visiting the party headquarters in 2009 at the age of 93.

== Personal life ==
On 22 November 1947, Mintoff married Moyra de Vere Bentinck, daughter of Lt. Col. Reginald Bentinck, of Dutch and British noble lineage related via the Cavendish-Bentinck line to the late Queen Elizabeth II. The couple wed at the parish church of Bir id-Deheb (Our Lady of Mercy), a tiny 19th century chapel on the outskirts of Żejtun. The chapel's rector was Canon Ġwann Vella, a friend of Mintoff. They met during his studies in Oxford. The couple had two daughters, including Yana.

=== Death ===
Mintoff was taken to hospital on 18 July 2012. He was later discharged on 4 August and spent his 96th birthday at home where he died on 20 August. He was given a state funeral by the Government of Malta on 25 August.

== Legacy ==
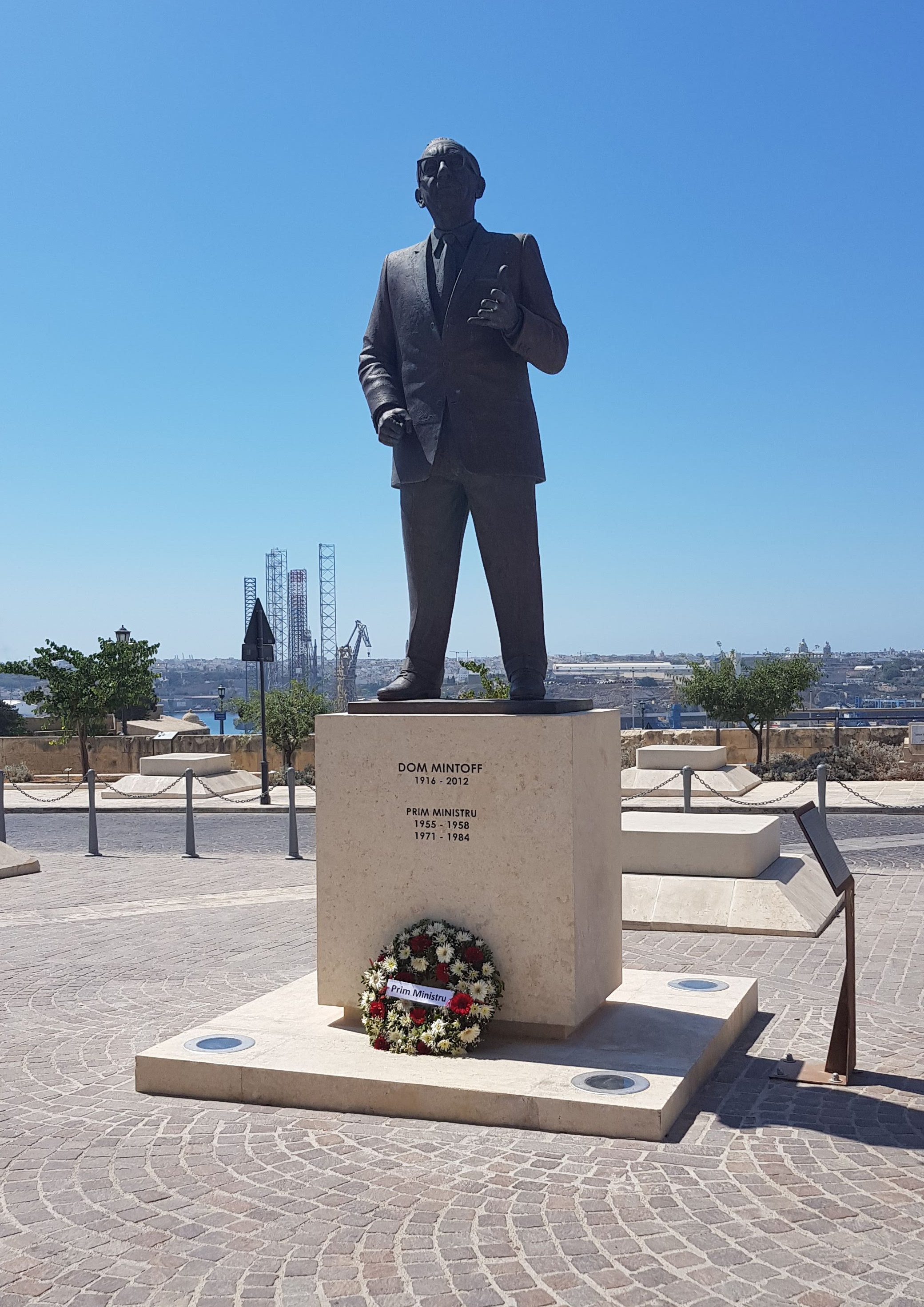
Monument to Mintoff in Castille Square in Valletta

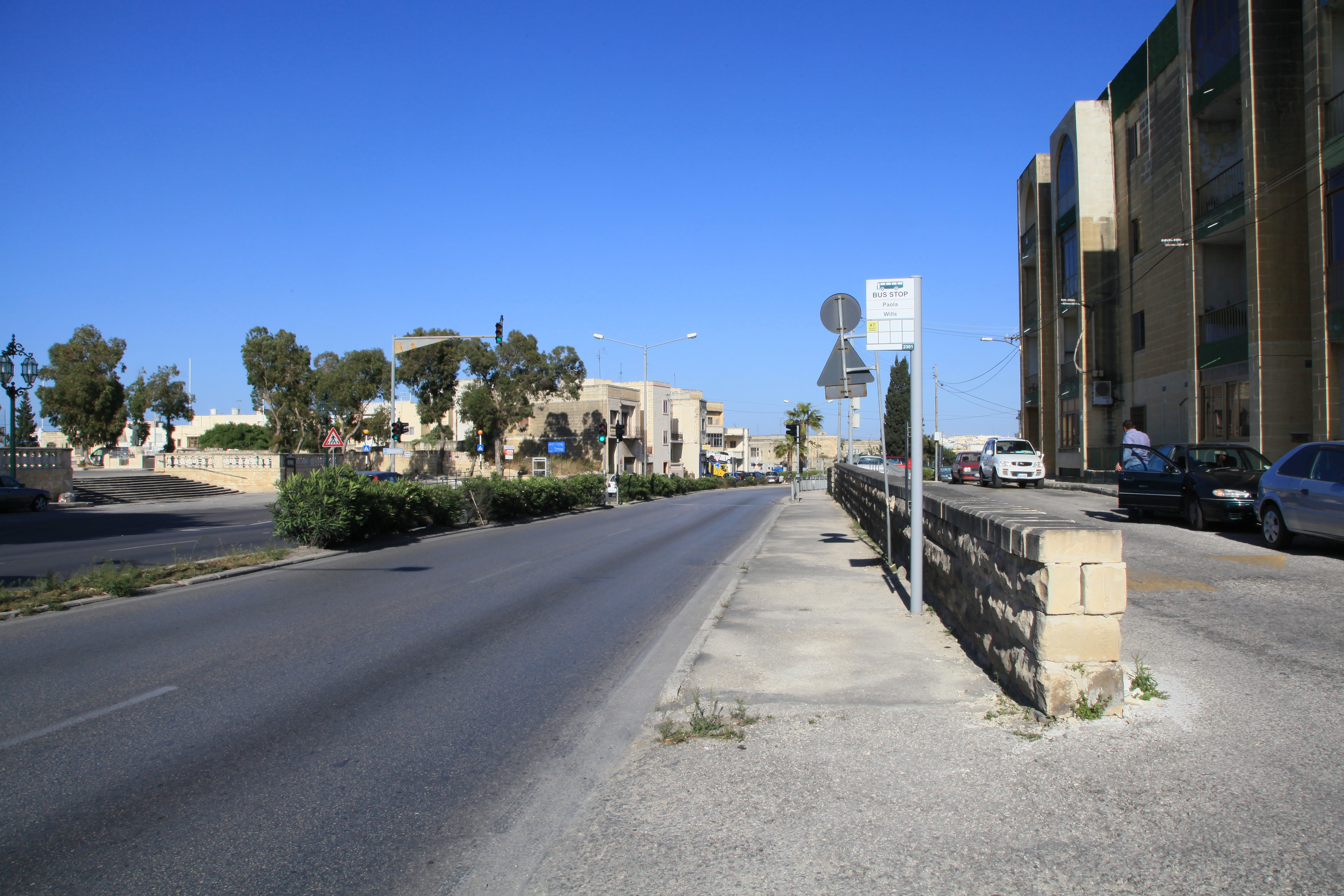
Dom Mintoff Road in Paola

While generations of loyal supporters continue to credit Mintoff with the introduction of social benefits like the children's allowance, two-thirds pensions, minimum wage and social housing as well as the creation of Air Malta, Sea Malta, the separation of church and state and ending 200 years of British colonial rule, critics point to his divisive legacy, and the violence and unrest that characterised his time in office. It has also been pointed out by Mintoff's critics that a pervasive cult of personality has been maintained after his death, most prominently within the Labour Party.

Mintoff's legacy in Malta is extremely apparent, being the longest-ruling Prime Minister in Maltese history, and overseeing the transition of Malta away from a British colony, to a socialist-aligned, neutral republic. As such, the modern legal and societal structure of Malta were developed under the Labour government.

Mintoff was fundamental to the development of the Constitution of Malta and the development of Maltese foreign policy, in which Malta was a member of the Non-Aligned Movement, and prioritised good relations with the second and Third World. The modern system of nationalised health care in Malta was likewise created under Mintoff, as well as the modern Maltese housing system. Mintoff is controversially also remembered as a socialist populist that dominated the structure of the Maltese government.

The economy of Malta, a relatively high income nation with a highly advanced welfare economy, and subsidies were devolved under Mintoff. Under Mintoff, language reforms saw an increase of schools teaching Maltese, which managed to revive the language from previous colonial-era decline.

In 2013, the main square in front the church of Our Lady of Mercy in Bir id-Deheb, Żejtun (where Dom and Moyra Mintoff were married) was renamed Dom Mintoff Square.

In December 2013, a limestone monument was unveiled in front of his Tarxien home, by stonemason Sergio Gauci.

In December 2014, a statue of Mintoff was unveiled in his hometown Cospicua, designed by the artist Noel Galea Bason.

In March 2016, Corradino Road (Maltese: Triq Kordin) in Paola was renamed Dom Mintoff Road (Maltese: Triq il-Perit Dom Mintoff). Other roads were subsequently renamed in his honour in Cospicua and Marsa. Another street named after Mintoff is located in the capital of Gozo, Rabat.

In August 2016, a monument to Mintoff was unveiled in the Chinese Garden of Serenity in Santa Luċija. Many plaques and monuments commemorating various anniversaries of his leadership of the Labour Party can be found around Malta, primarily near current or former Labour Party clubs.

In May 2018, a second statue of Mintoff was unveiled in Castille Square in Valletta directly opposite the office of the Prime Minister.

In May 2019, a garden in Paola was renamed Dom Mintoff Garden after extensive rehabilitation works. In August 2019, a hall was renamed after Mintoff in the Ministry of Foreign Affairs in recognition of his contributions towards Maltese foreign policy.

In June 2023, a third statue of Mintoff was unveiled by the Paola Local Council in Dom Mintoff Garden designed by renowned sculptor Alfred Camilleri Cauchi.

== Awards and honours ==
=== National honours ===
- Companion of Honour of the National Order of Merit (1990) by right as a former Prime Minister of Malta
- Malta Self-Government Re-introduction Seventy-Fifth Anniversary Medal (1996)
- Malta Independence Fiftieth Anniversary Medal (2014) posthumous

=== Foreign honours ===
- Order of the Republic of Libya (1971)
- Grand Cordon of the Order of the Republic of Tunisia (1973)
- Grand Cordon of the Order of Ouissam Alaouite (Morocco) (1978)
- Al-Gaddafi International Prize for Human Rights (2008)

== Biography ==
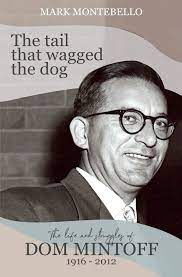
The Tail That Wagged The Dog: The life and struggles of Dom Mintoff (1916-2012) by Mark Montebello (2021)

In May 2021 the first fully-researched biography of Mintoff was launched in Malta. The Tail That Wagged The Dog: The life and struggles of Dom Mintoff (1916-2012), written and published in English by Mark Montebello, was issued by SKS Publications, a branch of Malta's Labour Party, which commissioned the book. Though at first welcomed by Prime Minister Robert Abela, the leader of the party, he later repudiated the biography, though the book was not withheld from being sold by the publisher. The vacillation was mainly due to Mintoff's children disassociating themselves from the publication. The author firmly stood by his work. Seven years in the making, the 640-page book was nonetheless positively hailed by critics, and even shortlisted for the national book prize.

The book was once again at the centre of controversy almost five years later, on 24 February 2026, when a nephew of Mintoff, Judge Lawrence Mintoff, publicly cited the earlier polemic over the publication of the biography as one of the two main reasons why Prime Minister Robert Abela was disinclined to nominate him for the pending post of Chief Justice of Malta.

Political offices
Preceded by Giorgio Borg Olivier	Prime Minister of Malta; 1955–1958	Vacant Title next held by Giorgio Borg Olivier
Preceded by Giorgio Borg Olivier	Prime Minister of Malta; 1971–1984	Succeeded by Karmenu Mifsud Bonnici
Party political offices
Preceded by Sir Paul Boffa	Leader of the Labour Party; 1949–1984	Succeeded by Karmenu Mifsud Bonnici
