= Albert Hyzler =

Maltese politician (1916–1993)

The Honourable Albert Victor Hyzler MP
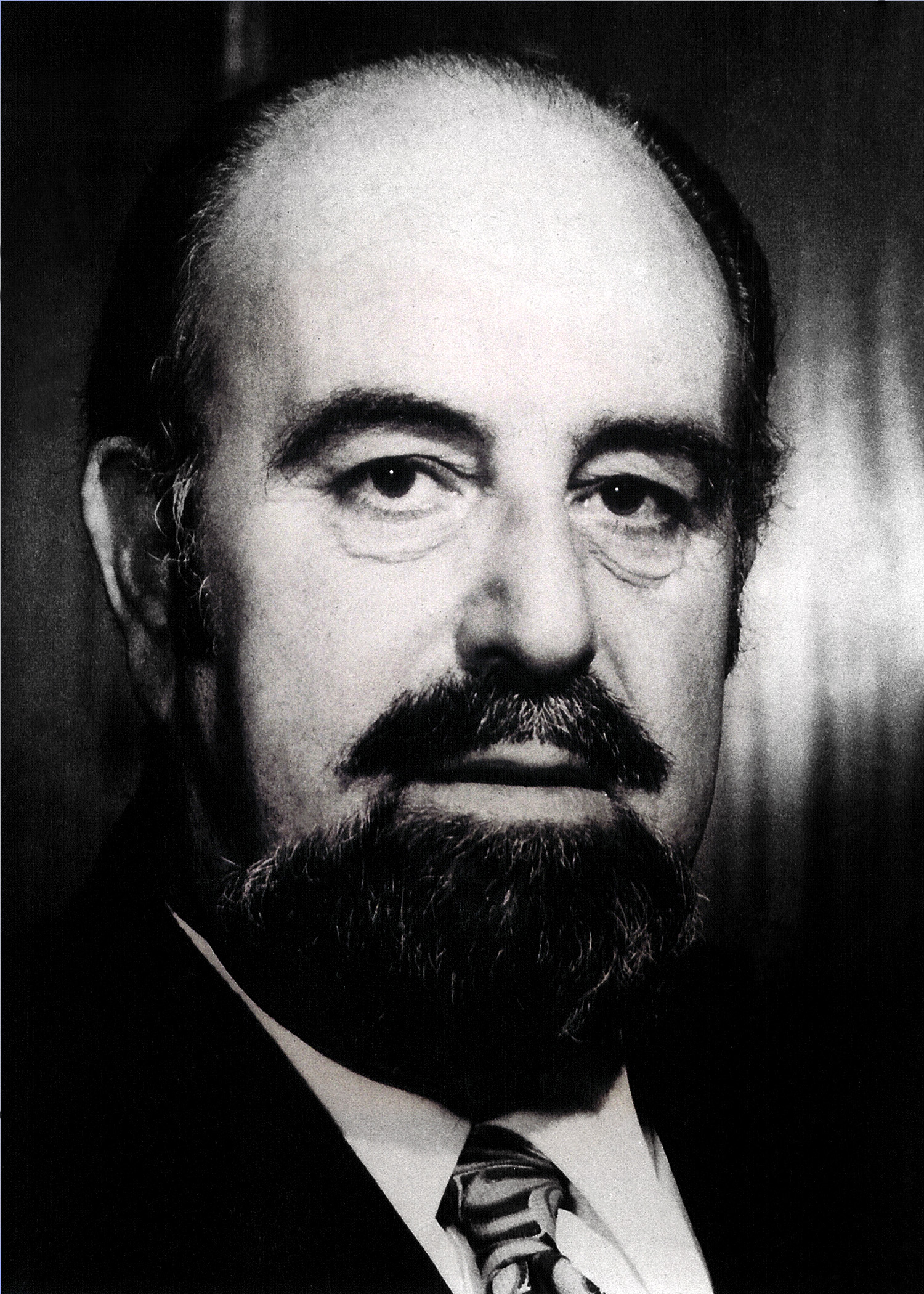

Acting President of Malta
- In office 27 December 1981 – 15 February 1982
- Preceded by: Anton Buttigieg
- Succeeded by: Agatha Barbara

Minister of Health
- Monarch: Elizabeth II

Minister of Development and Posts
- Monarch: Elizabeth II

Personal details
- Born: 20 November 1916 Valletta, Malta
- Died: 26 October 1993 (aged 76) Malta
- Party: Labour Party
- Other political affiliations: Democratic Action (1947–1950); Workers (1950–1953)
- Spouse: Marie Rose Petrocochino
- Education: Royal University of Malta

Albert Victor Hyzler MP (20 November 1916 – 26 October 1993) was a Maltese doctor and politician who was acting president of Malta from 27 December 1981 to 15 February 1982.

== Early life ==
Hyzler was born on 20 November 1916 to his parents Professor Joseph Hyzler and Marietta Muscat Fenech. He studied at the Lyceum and the Royal University of Malta and graduated as a doctor.

== Political career ==
Hyzler was elected to the Parliament of Malta in 1947 as a member of the Democratic Action Party, which was led by his father. The DAP dissolved in 1950. Afterwards Hyzler surprisingly contested and won the 1951 general election with the Malta Workers Party, before joining the Malta Labour Party in October 1953. He made his first speech in Żurrieq in November 1953. Hyzler was elected in every election he contested until his retirement in 1976.

Hyzler was a cabinet minister between 1955 and 1958, and between 1971 and 1976, first appointed as Minister of Health and Social Services from 1955 to 1958, then as Minister of Development and Posts from 1971 to 1974 and again as Minister of Health from 1974 until 1976. Hyzler retired on 20 September 1976 but was reappointed to serve as acting President of Malta from 27 December 1981 to 15 February 1982.

He died on 26 October 1993.

== Personal life ==
He was married to Marie Rose Petrocochino.

== See also ==
- Hyzler
