= Joseph Cassar (politician) =

Maltese politician (1918-2001)

Joseph Cassar (Maltese: Ġużè Cassar; 22 January 1918 – 27 November 2001) was a Maltese politician.

Cassar graduated from the Bishop's Seminary in Gozo, and the University of Malta.

In 1976, Cassar won the deputy leader seat against Wistin Abela. He was Finance Minister of Malta from 1979 to 1981.

== Related pages ==
- List of justice ministers of Malta
- List of finance ministers of Malta
