= Wistin Abela =

Maltese politician

The Honourable Wistin Abela MP

Deputy Prime Minister of Malta
- In office 1981–1983

Deputy Leader of the Labour Party

Personal details
- Born: 19 October 1933 Żejtun, Malta
- Died: 20 January 2014 (aged 80) Żejtun, Malta
- Party: Labour Party
- Spouse: Catherine Abela
- Children: 3 (Carmelina, Marjohn, Lycia)

Wistin Abela (19 October 1933 – 20 January 2014) was a Maltese politician. He was the Finance Minister from 1983 to 1987, and the Deputy Prime Minister of Malta from 1981 to 1983.

== Biography ==
Wistin Abela was involved in the Labour party since 1959, and became the president of a district's committee in 1961. He was also a mathematics teacher.

Wistin Abela served in the Parliament of Malta from 1966 to 1996, representing Zejtun. During his tenure, he worked on the creation of Air Malta, the transition to color of TV station Xandir Malta, the Malta Shipbuilding. He was part of the delegation representing Malta on the country's first participation to the conference of the Non-Aligned Movement in 1973.

Wistin Abela served as Parliamentary secretary for finance under Prime Minister Dom Mintoff from 1971 to 1974, Minister for development from 1974 to 1976, Minister of energy, ports, and telecommunications starting in 1976, and as deputy leader of the Labour Party and deputy prime minister between 1981 and 1982. He had initially run for deputy leader in 1976 but had lost against Joseph Cassar.

== Other tenures ==
- Since 1983: Governor of the International Bank for Reconstruction and Development in Malta

== Prizes ==
- 1997: Companion of the National Order of Merit of Malta

== Personal life ==
Wistin Abela was married to Catherine Abela. They had 3 children.
