= Anton Buttigieg =

President of Malta from 1976 to 1981

His Excellency Anton Buttigieg KUOM
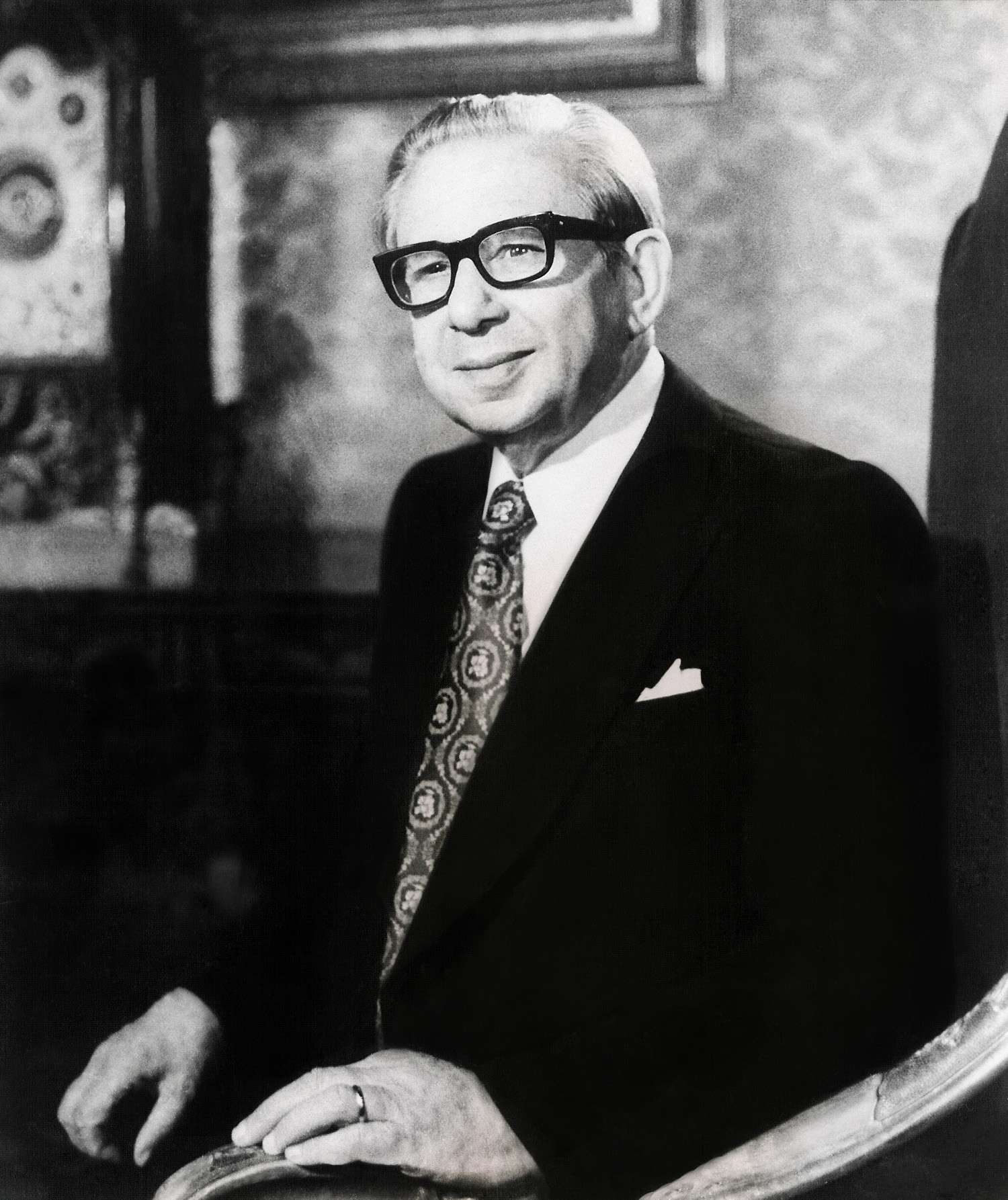

2nd President of Malta
- In office 27 December 1976 – 27 December 1981
- Prime Minister: Dom Mintoff
- Preceded by: Sir Anthony Mamo
- Succeeded by: Albert Hyzler (Acting); Agatha Barbara

Member of the Parliament of Malta
- In office 26 April 1962 – 27 December 1976

Personal details
- Born: 19 February 1912 Qala, Crown Colony of Malta
- Died: 5 May 1983 (aged 71) Qala, Malta
- Party: Labour Party
- Spouse(s): Carmen Bezzina (1944–1953); Connie Scicluna (1953–1957); Margery Patterson (1975–1983)
- Children: 3

Anton Buttigieg KUOM (Maltese: Anton Buttiġieġ [ɐnˈtɔːn bʊtːɪˈd͡ʒɪːt͡ʃ]; 19 February 1912 – 5 May 1983) was a Maltese politician and poet who served as the second president of Malta from 1976 to 1981. Prior to his tenure as president he was a member of the Parliament of Malta and president of the Labour Party.

== Early life and education ==
Anton Buttigieg was born in Qala, Malta, on 19 February 1912. He was educated at Qala Primary School, Gozo Seminarym and St Aloysius College. Buttigieg wanted to attend college to become a lawyer and his parents allowed him on the condition that he also study to become a priest. He graduated from the University of Malta with a degree in theology and jurisprudence.

Buttigieg became a notary in 1939, and a lawyer on 24 June 1940. During World War II he was stationed in Hamrun and was a police inspector.

== Career ==
=== Writing ===
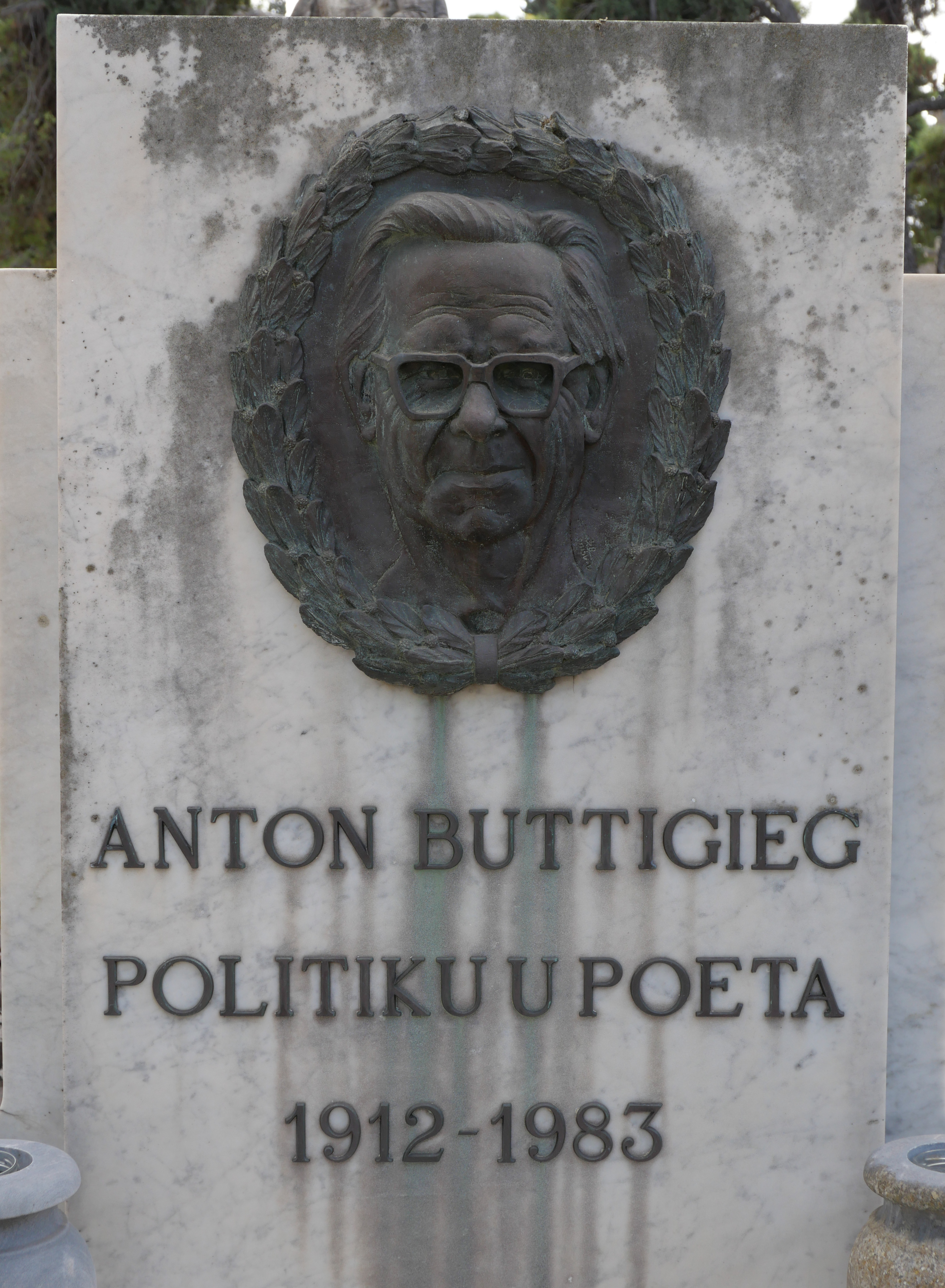
POLITIKU U POETA - Buttigieg's tombstone at the Addolorata Cemetery in Paola, the largest graveyard in Malta.

Buttigieg started writing poetry in 1929, and his work was published in Pronostku Malti. He was a member of the Akkademja tal-Malti and a member of Għaqda tal-Malti -—Universita founded by Rużar Briffa and Ġużè Bonnici. From 1944 to 1948, he was a law reporter for the Times of Malta. He wrote an autobiography, Toni tal-Baħri, which was three volumes in length.

=== Politics ===
Buttigieg joined the Labour Party in 1955, and was elected to the Parliament of Malta in 1956. He was the president of the Labour Party from 1959 to 1961. He served in the parliament until his appointment to the presidency.

In 1971, Buttigieg was appointed as Minister of Justice and Parliamentary Affairs and Deputy Prime Minister under Prime Minister Dom Mintoff. From 1976 to 1982, he served as the second President of Malta. During his tenure as president the British left Malta on 31 March 1979.

== Personal life ==
Buttigieg married Carmen Bezzina, with whom he had three children before her death. He married Connie Scicluna, but she died in a traffic accident three years later in London. In 1975, he married Margery Helen. Buttigieg died on 5 May 1983. A state funeral was held for him and he was buried in Addolorata Cemetery, Paola.

== Publications ==
=== Lyrical poetry ===
- Mill-Gallarija ta' Żgħożiti (From the Balcony of my Youth; 1949)
- Poeżiji Miġbura – L-ewwel Volum: the first two books, From the Balcony of my Youth and Lamps in the Night were published in 1978 in one volume under the title Collected Poems

=== Humorous poetry ===
- Ejjew nidħku ftit (Let us laugh a little; 1963)

== Works cited ==
=== Books ===
- Lentz, Harris, ed. (2014). Heads of States and Governments Since 1945. Routledge. ISBN 9781134264902.

=== Web ===
- "Anton Buttigieg". Akkademja tal-Malti. Archived from the original on 21 June 2025.
- "Anton Buttigieg". HELA. Archived from the original on 21 June 2025.
- "Dr. Anton Buttigieg". Cultural Heritage Directorate. Archived from the original on 21 June 2025.
- "Hon. Anton Buttigieg MP". Parliament of Malta. Archived from the original on 16 February 2025.

Political offices
Preceded by Sir Anthony Mamo	President of Malta; 1976–1981	Succeeded by Albert Hyzler (acting)
