= National Order of Merit (Malta) =

State order of Malta

National Order of Merit Ordni Nazzjonali tal-Meritu
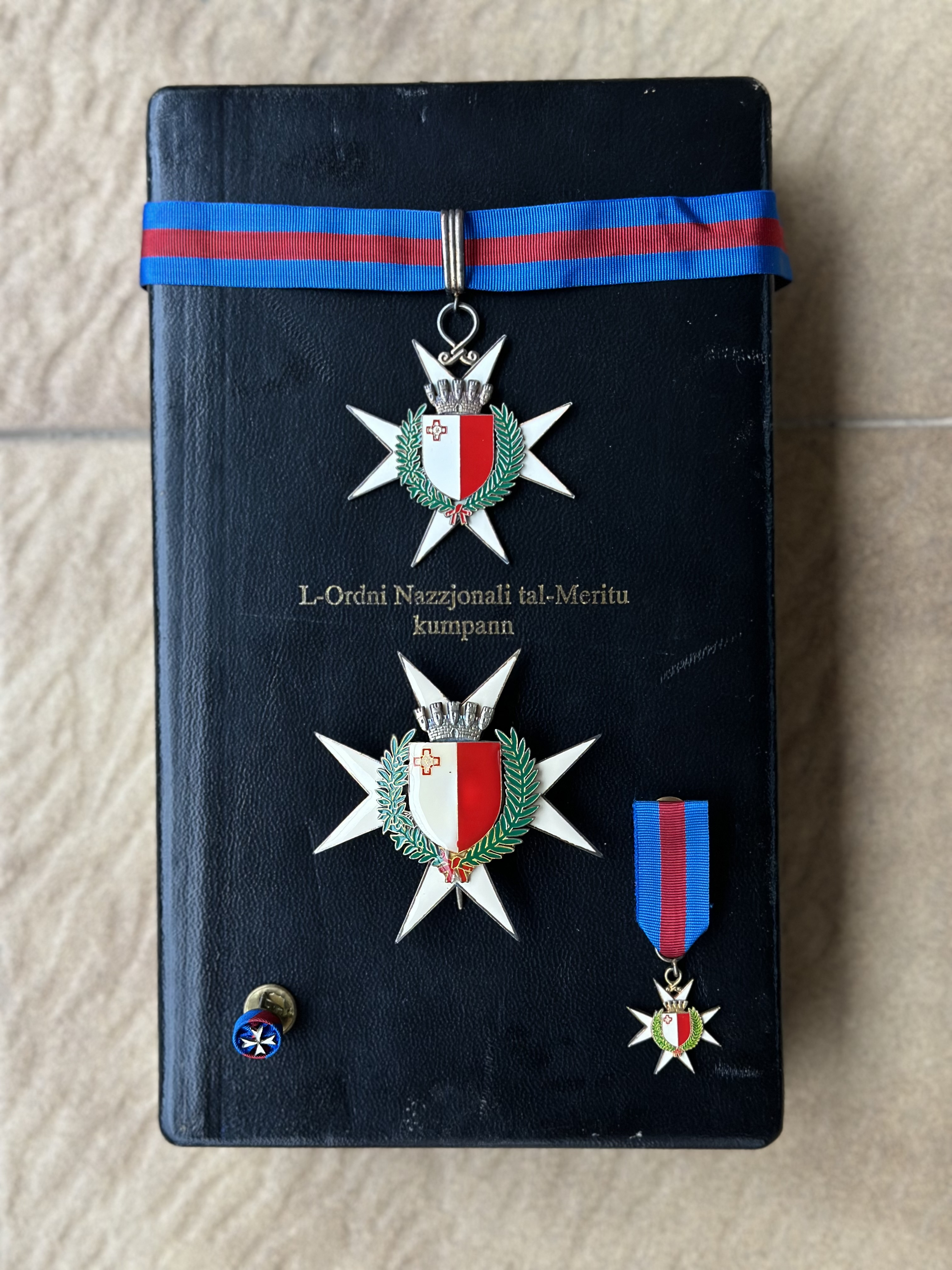
- Companion with Star of the National Order of Merit

Awarded by Malta
- Type: Order
- Motto: Virtute et Constantia
- Awarded for: Presidents, Prime Ministers, and distinguished services to Malta
- Status: Currently constituted
- Grades: Companion of Honour; Companion; Officer; Member; Honorary : Companion of Honour with Collar; Companion of Honour; Companion with Breast Star; Companion; Officer; Member

Precedence
- Next (higher): None (highest)
- Next (lower): Order of the Tribute to the Republic
- Ribbon bar of the order

The National Order of Merit is a state order of the Republic of Malta. The order is divided into four grades that may be awarded to Maltese citizens.

The grade of Companion of Honour of the National Order of Merit is the highest honour that the government of Malta may confer upon its citizens. Citizens of other countries may be awarded the order on an honorary basis.

== Recipients ==
The National Order of Merit pays tribute to Maltese citizens who distinguish themselves in different fields of endeavour. The motto of the Order is Virtute et Constantia. Only Maltese citizens are eligible to be appointed members of the Order. However, honorary membership may be conferred on foreign nationals who have distinguished themselves by their service in the promotion and fostering of international relations, or who have earned the respect and gratitude of the people of the Maltese Islands.

In addition to past and present presidents and prime ministers who are by virtue of their offices members of the National Order of Merit in the grade of Companion of Honour, there can be only three other members in this grade at any one time. In the other grades the maximum at any one time is twelve Companions, twenty Officers and one hundred Members. Annual appointments may not exceed two Companions, three Officers and ten Members, provided that in determining the number of appointees to the Order, no account shall be taken of the appointment of Honorary Members.

== Grades ==
=== National appointments ===
The four grades of the Order are designed to embrace a wide spectrum of achievement and service. Appointees to the National Order of Merit are entitled in terms of the law to place the following letters after their names:

- Companions of Honour – K.U.O.M. (Kumpannji tal-Unur)
- Companions – K.O.M. (Kumpannji)
- Officers – U.O.M. (Uffiċjali)
- Members – M.O.M. (Membri)

=== Honorary appointments ===
In addition to the same rank as national appointments, two ranks have been added

- Honorary Companions of Honour with Collar – K.U.O.M. approved by Legal Notice No. 178 of 7/12/94
- Honorary Companions of Honour – K.U.O.M.
- Honorary Companions with Breast Star – K.O.M. approved by Legal Notice No. 162 of 14/11/95
- Honorary Companions – K.O.M.
- Honorary Officers – U.O.M.
- Honorary Members – M.O.M.

== Insignia ==
Companions of Honour

The insignia for a Companion of Honour includes a breast star with silver rays 80 mm (3.1 in) in diameter. Superimposed over the rays is a silver-gilt white enameled Maltese Cross 70 mm (2.8 in) in diameter. In the center of the cross is the Coat of arms of Malta. The badge of the order is similar to the star, but only includes the Maltese Cross and the coat of arms. The badge of the order is suspended from a blue sash 102 mm (4.0 in) wide with a central stripe of red. The sash for female recipients is 63.5 mm (2.50 in) wide.

Honorary companions who are heads of state at the time of their appointment are entitled to wear the badge of the order from a collar 1,000 mm (39 in) long and 24.5 mm (0.96 in) wide. The collar consists of two silver-gilt chains 4.5 mm (0.18 in) wide linked together with alternating 25 mm (0.98 in) wide red and white enamelled discs, 26.5 mm (1.04 in) wide enameled Maltese Crosses, and 25 mm (0.98 in) wide black enameled discs bearing five-turreted silver-gilt mural crowns with a total of five of each on the collar.

Companions

The breast star for a companion is the same as that of the Companion of Honour but without the silver rays. It is a Maltese Cross 70 mm (2.8 in) in diameter. In the center of the cross is the Coat of Arms of Malta. The badge of the order for a companion is 57 mm (2.2 in) wide and worn suspended from a neck ribbon of identical colors to the sash but 18 mm (0.71 in) in width. For ladies, the badge of the order is worn on a 32 mm (1.3 in) wide ribbon fashioned into a bow.

Officers

Officers wear the badge of the order suspended from a ribbon 38 mm (1.5 in) wide on the chest. The badge for officers is 45 mm (1.8 in) in diameter. When worn by a female recipient the ribbon suspending the badge is fashioned into a bow.

Members

Members wear the badge of the order in the same manner as officers. The Maltese Cross on a member's badge is silver instead of enamelled.

== See also ==
- List of honorary companions of honour of the National Order of Merit
