= District 7, Malta =

Electoral district in Malta

District 7
- Constituency for the Parliament of Malta
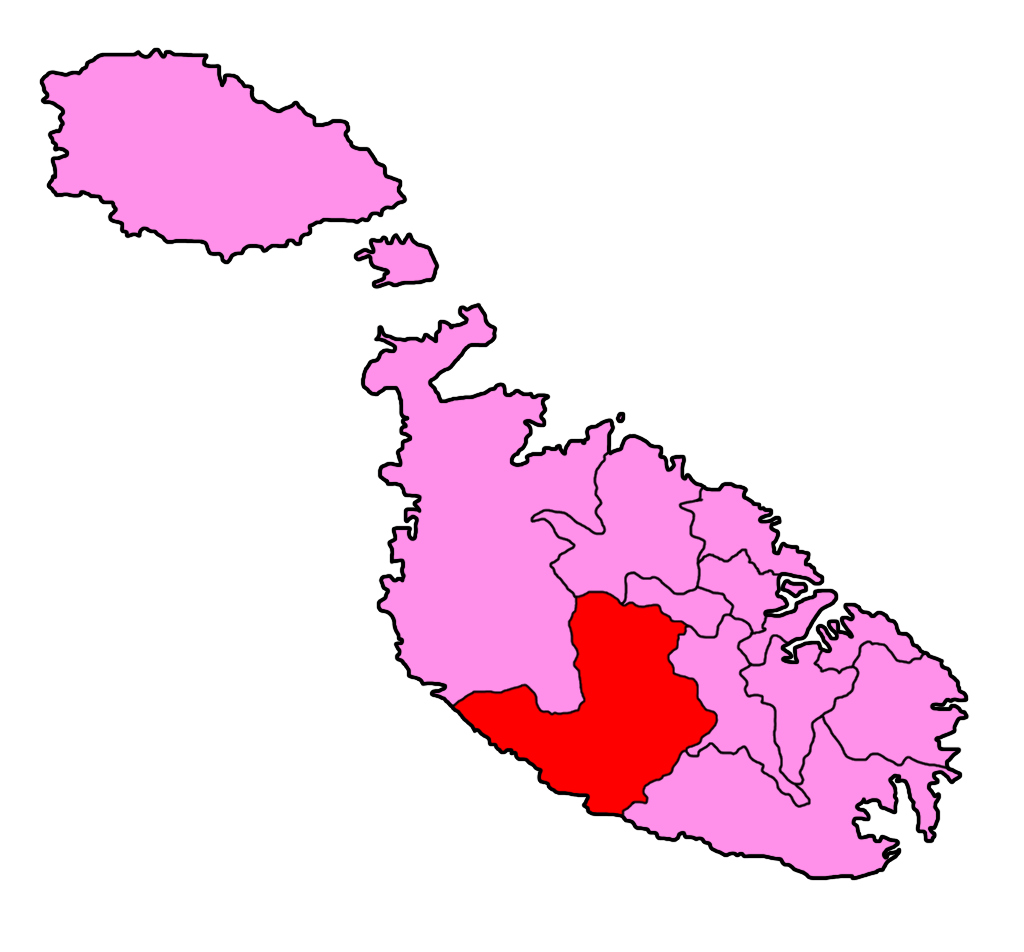
- District within Malta

Current constituency
- Created: 1962
- Number of members: • 5 popularly elected • 2 elected via Art 52A of the Constitution for gender parity.
- Party: • PL - 3 seats • PN - 2 seats

District 7 is an electoral district in Malta. It was established in 1921. Its boundaries have changed many times but it currently consists of the localities of Ħad-Dingli, L-Imġarr, L-Imtarfa, Ir-Rabat and part of Ħaż-Żebbuġ.

== Villages falling under this district ==
- Żebbuġ, Malta - Città Rohan
- Rabat, Malta
  - Baħrija hamlet
  - Tal-Virtù hamlet
- Dingli
- Mtarfa (Note: Until 1999 part of Rabat.)
- Since 2026, Mdina has been transferred to District 7 and shall vote with this district for the first time in 2026.

== Representatives ==
Election	Representatives				
1921	Edwin Vassallo (Conservative)	Francesco Ferris (UPM)	Giuseppe De Giorgio (UPM)	Salvatore Borg Olivier (UPM)	4 seats 1921–1935
1924	Edwin Vassallo (Conservative)	Luigi Azzopardi Castaldi (UPM)	Giuseppe De Giorgio (UPM)	Salvatore Borg Olivier (UPM)	4 seats 1921–1935
1927	Edwin Vassallo (Conservative)	Anthony Joseph Montanaro (Conservative)	Giuseppe De Giorgio (UPM)	Nicolo Delia (Nationalist)	4 seats 1921–1935
1932	Edwin Vassallo (Conservative)	Luigi Azzopardi Castaldi (UPM)	Giuseppe De Giorgio (UPM)	Niccolo Delia (Nationalist)	4 seats 1921–1935
District suspended
1947	Amadeo Fava (Labour)	Anthony Schembri Adami (Labour)	Peter Paul Scicluna (Labour)	Filippo Apap Bologna (DAP)	Emmanuele Agius (Nationalist)
1950	Amadeo Fava (Labour)	Anthony Schembri Adami (Labour)	Pawlu Grech (Workers')	Carmelo Schembri (Nationalist)	Emmanuele Agius (Nationalist)
1951	Mike Pulis (Labour)	Anthony Schembri Adami (Labour)	Giuseppe Attard Montalto (Conservative)	Carmelo Schembri (Nationalist)	Giuseppe Sammut (Nationalist)
1953	Mike Pulis (Labour)	Kalcidon Agius (Labour)	Giuseppe Attard Montalto (Conservative)	Francis Bezzina Wettinger (Workers')	Emanuele Agius (Nationalist)
1955	Mike Pulis (Labour)	Kalcidon Agius (Labour)	Giorgio Borg Olivier (Nationalist)	Joseph Spiteri (Nationalist)	Emanuele Agius (Nationalist)
1962	Patrick Holland (Labour)	Antonio Busuttil (DNP)	Mabel Strickland (PCP)	Gaetano Borg Olivier (Nationalist)	Giovanni Felice (Nationalist)
1966	Patrick Holland (Labour)	Joseph M. Baldacchino (Labour)	Vincent "Ċensu" Tabone (Nationalist)	Gaetano Borg Olivier (Nationalist)	Giovanni Felice (Nationalist)
1971	Patrick Holland (Labour)	Joseph M. Baldacchino (Labour)	Censu Tabone (Nationalist)	George Bonello Du Puis (Nationalist)	Mario Felice (Nationalist)
1976	Anton Buttigieg (Labour)	John Buttigieg (Labour)	Benny Camilleri (Labour)	Antoine Mifsud Bonnici (Nationalist)	Guido de Marco (Nationalist)
1981	Cettina Darmenia Brincat (Labour)	John Buttigieg (Labour)	Joseph P. Sciberras (Labour)	Antoine Mifsud Bonnici (Nationalist)	Guido de Marco (Nationalist)
1987	Charles Mangion (Labour)	John Buttigieg (Labour)	Herman Farrugia (Nationalist)	Antoine Mifsud Bonnici (Nationalist)	Guido de Marco (Nationalist)
1992	Charles Buhagiar (Labour)	John Attard Montalto (Labour)	Richard (Ritchie) Muscat (Nationalist)	Michael Bonnici (Nationalist)	Tonio Borg (Nationalist)
1996	Charles Buhagiar (Labour)	Gavin Gulia (Labour)	Jeffrey Pullicino Orlando (Nationalist)	Michael Bonnici (Nationalist)	Louis Galea (Nationalist)
1998	Charles Buhagiar (Labour)	Gavin Gulia (Labour)	Jeffrey Pullicino Orlando (Nationalist)	Michael Bonnici (Nationalist)	Louis Galea (Nationalist)
2003	Charles Buhagiar (Labour)	Gavin Gulia (Labour)	Jeffrey Pullicino Orlando (Nationalist)	Joe Cassar (Nationalist)	Lawrence Gonzi (Nationalist)
2008	Charles Buhagiar (Labour)	Gavin Gulia (Labour)	Jeffrey Pullicino Orlando (Nationalist)	Joe Cassar (Nationalist)	Lawrence Gonzi (Nationalist)
2013	Charles Buhagiar (Labour)	Ian Borg (Labour)	Godfrey Farrugia (Labour)/ (Democratic)	Joe Cassar (Nationalist)	Lawrence Gonzi (Nationalist)
2017	Edward Scicluna (Labour)	Ian Borg (Labour)	Godfrey Farrugia (Labour)/ (Democratic)	Silvio Schembri (Labour)	Adrian Delia (Nationalist)
2022	Julia Farrugia Portelli (Labour)	Ian Borg (Labour)	Charles Azzopardi (Nationalist)	Malcolm Paul Agius Galea (Labour)	Rebekah Borg (Nationalist)
