= Progressive Constitutional Party (Malta) =

Political party in Malta

Progressive Constitutional Party Maltese: Partit Progressiv Kostituzzjonali (Maltese name never used)
- Leader: Mabel Strickland
- Founded: October 1953
- Dissolved: 1971
- Split from: Constitutional Party
- Newspaper: Times of Malta (de facto)
- Ideology: British Monarchism; Pro-Dominion status Anti-Communism
- Religion: Roman Catholicism

The Progressive Constitutional Party (PCP), also known as the Progressive Constitutionalist Party, was a political party in Malta between 1953 and 1971.

== History ==
The PCP was established in 1953 by Mabel Strickland, owner of the Times of Malta and daughter of Gerald Strickland, the founder of the Constitutional Party. It was a split from the Constitutional Party, which Strickland had left in protest against its support for the Labour Party's policy of integration with the United Kingdom.

The party failed to win a seat in elections in 1953 and 1955, but won a single seat in the 1962 elections. However, it lost its seat in the post-independence 1966 elections. After failing to win a seat in the 1971 elections it subsequently disappeared.

== Ideology ==
The party promoted loyalty to the Catholic church and the British Crown, but advocated dominion status for Malta to avoid any cultural assimilation or secularisation that integration with the United Kingdom would bring. It also held a strict anti-communist line.

== Electoral history ==
Election	Leader	Votes	%	Seats	+/–	Rank	Status
1953	Mabel Strickland	5,128	4.33%	0 / 40	New	4th	Extra-Parliamentary
1955	Mabel Strickland	3,649	3.02%	0 / 40	0	▲3rd	Extra-Parliamentary
1962	Mabel Strickland	7,290	4.84%	1 / 40	▲1	▼5th	"Umbrella" Coalition; PN-PDN-PĦN-PCP
1966	Mabel Strickland	2,009	1.4%	0 / 40	▼1	▲4th	Extra-Parliamentary
1971	Mabel Strickland	1,756	1.04%	0 / 40	0	▲3rd	Extra-Parliamentary
Party dissolved
