= Christian Workers' Party =

Maltese political party (1961–1966

Christian Workers' Party Partit tal-Ħaddiema Nsara
- Abbreviation: CWP
- President: Paul Boffa (honorary)
- Founder: Toni Pellegrini
- Founded: 1961
- Dissolved: 1966
- Split from: Labour Party
- Ideology: Political Catholicism; Catholic social teaching Anti-communism
- Religion: Catholicism

The Christian Workers' Party (Maltese: Partit tal-Ħaddiema Nsara; CWP) was a political party in Malta. It existed from 1961 to 1966.

== Creation ==
The party was established in 1961 by Toni Pellegrini, a former secretary general of the Labour Party. Pellegrini had fallen out with Dom Mintoff during the 1961 politico-religious crisis, and the new party was a direct answer to Mintoff's dispute with the Catholic Church in Malta then led by Archbishop Mikiel Gonzi. It was designed to attract the Catholic vote of traditional Labourites refused to vote for Mintoff's Labour Party due to its anticlerical stance. It was often cited to be a resurrection of the (Catholic) Labour Party founded in 1921 by Michael Gonzi and sought to expound Catholic (leftist) social teaching. Its other aim was to deny Mintoff's party as many votes as possible and still be a party loyal both to the Church and the Queen.

=== 1962 elections ===
The CWP contested the 1962 elections under a manifesto promising "Work for all first and foremost." It contested under the "umbrella" of the Catholic Church. The 'umbrella' was a reference to the four parties that contested the 1962 elections: the Nationalist Party, the Christian Workers' Party, the Democratic Nationalist Party and the Progressive Constitutionalist Party. It had the approval of the Maltese Catholic Church.

Pellegrini's party received 9.5% of the vote and won four of the 50 seats in Parliament. The Nationalists gained 25 seats, the Labour Party 16, the DNP 4 and Mabel Strickland's PCP 1. In all, the 'umbrella' won 34 seats. The Nationalists hailed this as a great victory, but the Catholic Church considered it as a defeat; 36% still voted for the Labour Party under pain of interdiction.

During the course of the legislature, independence was gained in 1964, but soon after the CWP soon lost a member of the Party, Daniel Micallef resigned from politics, disappointed at the fact that Pellegrini negotiated independence with a pro-British rather than a pro-Maltese agenda even though the party's manifesto stated that the CWP was against independence.

== 1966 elections ==
Even if peace with the Church and the Labour Party was not to be achieved until 1969, the interdict had been lifted in 1964 (but still the ecclesiastical ban on Labour newspapers remained in force while it was still a mortal sin for the faithful to attend Labour Party meetings). As a direct result, Mintoff increased his party's share of the vote at the expense of the CWP. The 1966 election results were catastrophic for the CWP, which saw its vote share reduced to 6%, resulting in it losing all four seats. Following the elections, the party was dissolved. Pellegrini was later readmitted into the Labour Party and became a director of Xandir Malta.

== Ideology ==
The CWP was pro-church and anti-communist. It supported independence from the United Kingdom by a gradual process of economic development. It wanted to reduce economic dependence on the British military presence and to abolish direct taxation in order to become a tax haven
