= Black Monday (Malta) =

1979 rally turned riot in Malta

Black Monday in Malta refers to 15 October 1979 when the Progress Press (publisher of The Times) and the home of Eddie Fenech Adami, then Leader of the Opposition, were ransacked following a rally by the Labour Party.

== Background ==
A political rally was held by Labour supporters in the aftermath of an alleged attempt on Prime Minister Dom Mintoff's life in his offices at the Auberge de Castille, Valletta.

== Events ==
That evening a large crowd gathered outside the Prime Minister's office and from there marched toward the Progress Press offices on St. Paul Street, Valletta. The building was ransacked and set on fire. Many historical archives were burnt during the fire. Although the printing press was destroyed, The Times was still published as usual the following day (though in a reduced format) from the printing press of the Nationalist Party. The newspaper holds the record of never having missed an issue from its founding day.

Also on this day, a number of Malta Labour Party thugs invaded the private residence of Dr. Edward Fenech Adami, leader of the Nationalist Party, ransacking his home and assaulting his wife, Mary, his four children and his elderly mother.

== International response ==
The European Parliament and several European governments expressed deep concern regarding these incidents. Three days after Black Monday, Mintoff expressed his personal regret in writing to Mabel Strickland, proprietor of Progress Press. He explicitly condemned the violence in an interview published by the Italian newsmagazine Panorama on 11 November.

== Aftermath ==
The perpetrators were never brought to justice.
