= 1962 Maltese general election =

- 17–19 February 1962
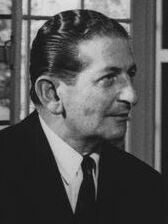

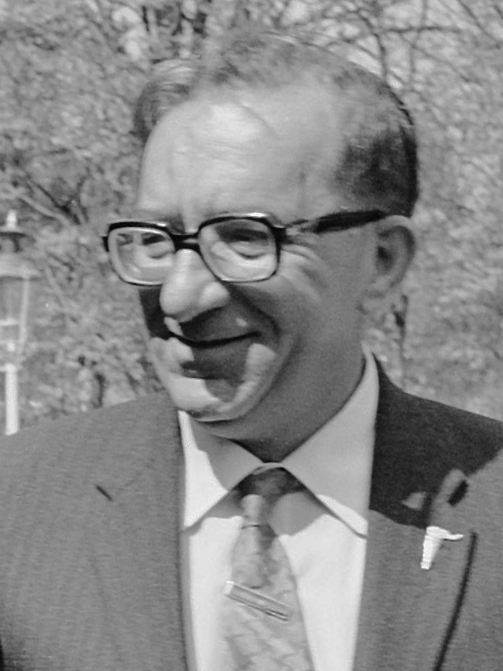

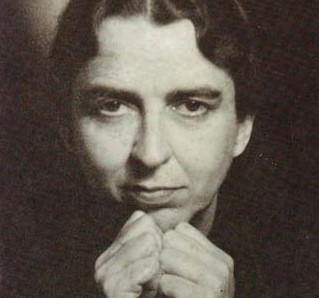
	First party	Second party	Third party
			CWP
Leader	George Borg Olivier	Dom Mintoff	Toni Pellegrini
Party	Nationalist	Labour	Christian Workers'
Last election	40.21%, 17 seats	56.73%, 23 seats	New
Seats won	25	16	4
Seat change	▲8	▼7	New
Popular vote	63,262	50,974	14,285
Percentage	42.00%	33.85%	9.49%
	Fourth party	Fifth party
	PDN
Leader	Herbert Ganado	Mabel Strickland
Party	PDN	PCP
Last election	New	3.02%, 0 seats
Seats won	4	1
Seat change	New	▲1
Popular vote	13,968	7,290
Percentage	9.27%	4.84%
Elected Prime Minister
George Borg Olivier
Nationalist

General elections were held in Malta between 17 and 19 February 1962. The Nationalist Party emerged as the largest party, winning 25 of the 50 seats.

The Nationalist Party and four other pro-Catholic Church, self-declared anti-communist parties, formed an electoral pact against the Labour Party. This election is considered to be also the one to give the parties a mandate in favour of (or against) future Independence from the United Kingdom.

== Electoral system ==
The elections were held using the single transferable vote system, whilst the number of seats was increased from 40 to 50. Due to the nature of the electoral system not providing for electoral alliances, party candidates appeared individually on ballot papers.

== Participating parties ==
Party	Founded	Leader	Ideology/Ideologies	Political position	Pre-election composition	Stance on Maltese Independence
"Umbrella Coalition" (Note: An electoral pact signed by The Nationalist Party and four other self-declared anti-communist parties, against the Labour Party — whose executive committee was under an ecclesiastical interdict — at the insistence and encouragement of the Catholic Church, aided popularly by the Diocesan Junta of Catholic Organisations, a coalition in itself of various Catholic organisations namely the Maltese sections of Catholic Action and Young Christian Workers, with the Society for Christian Doctrine - MUSEUM (the latter at the time also called Society of the Sons and Daughters of the Pope). Due to the nature of the Maltese electoral system which does not provide for electoral coalitions, party candidates appeared individually on ballot papers.)						
Nationalist Party	1926 (Note: Has direct descendance from the Anti-Riformista, Partito Nazionale, and Partito Democratico Nazionalista, founded in 1883.)	Giorgio Borg Olivier	Christian Democracy	Centre-right to Right-wing	17 / 40	check
Christian Workers' Party	1961	Toni Pellegrini	Anti-communism Political Catholicism	Centre-right to Right-wing	—N/a	Gradual
Democratic Christian Party	1961	George Ransley	Anti-independence	Centre-right to Right-wing	—N/a	X mark
Democratic Nationalist Party	1959	Herbert Ganado	Christian Democracy; Political Catholicism	Centre-right to Right-wing	—N/a	X mark
Progressive Constitutional Party	1953	Mabel Strickland	Monarchism; Dominion Status; Anti-Independence	Centre-right to Right-wing	—N/a	X mark
Labour Party	1921	Dominic 'Dom' Mintoff	Democratic Socialism Secularism Factions: Marxism	Centre-left to Left-wing with far-left factions	23 / 40	check

== Results ==
Party or alliance		Votes	%	Seats	+/–
Umbrella Coalition	Nationalist Party	63,262	42.00	25	+8
Umbrella Coalition	Christian Workers' Party	14,285	9.49	4	New
Umbrella Coalition	Democratic Nationalist Party	13,968	9.27	4	New
Umbrella Coalition	Progressive Constitutional Party	7,290	4.84	1	+1
Umbrella Coalition	Democratic Christian Party	699	0.46	0	New
Umbrella Coalition	Total	99,504	66.07	34	+17
Malta Labour Party		50,974	33.85	16	–7
Independents		128	0.08	0	–
Total		150,606	100.00	50	+10
Valid votes		150,606	99.39		
Invalid/blank votes		927	0.61		
Total votes		151,533	100.00		
Registered voters/turnout		166,936	90.77		
Source: Nohlen & Stöver
