= Democratic Christian Party (Malta) =

Former Maltese political party

Democratic Christian Party Partit Demokratiku Nisrani
- Abbreviation: PDN; PDNis (Note: Used to differentiate from Herbert Ganado's PDN)
- Leader: George Ransley
- Founded: 1961
- Ideology: Anti-Independence
- Political position: Right-wing
- Religion: Roman Catholicism

The Democratic Christian Party (Maltese: Partit Demokratiku Nisrani) was a minor political party in Malta formed by Chevallier George Ransley to contest the 1962 general election. The party ran twelve candidates in four of the ten electoral districts. None were elected, with the party only received 699 votes. It dissolved following the election.

== Election results ==
Election	Leader	Seats contested	Votes	%	Seats	Rank	Status
1962	George Ransley	12 / 50	699	0.46	0 / 50	7th	Extra-parliamentary
