= Joseph Flores =

Joseph Flores may refer to:

- Joseph Flores (Maltese politician) (1907–1974), judge and member of the legislative assembly
- Joseph Flores (Guamanian politician) (1900–1981), Governor of Guam
