= Palazzo Parisio =

Palazzo Parisio may refer to:

- Palazzo Parisio (Valletta)
- Palazzo Parisio (Naxxar)

== See also ==
- Villa Parisio
