= 1966 Maltese general election =

- 26–28 March 1966
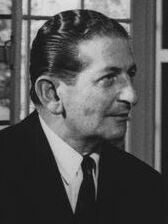

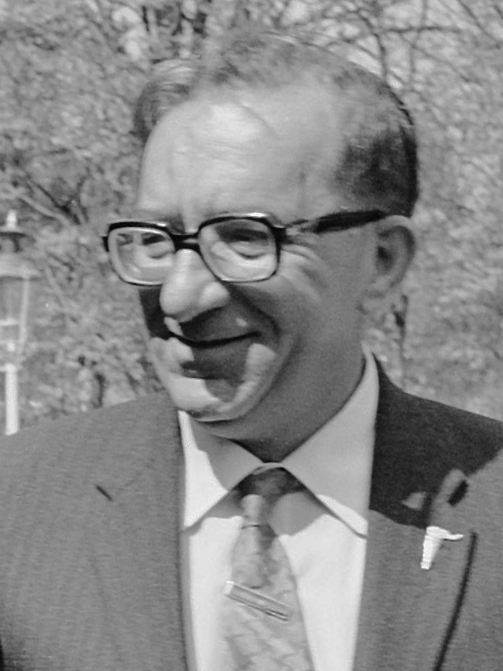
	First party	Second party
Leader	George Borg Olivier	Dom Mintoff
Party	Nationalist	Labour
Last election	42.00%, 25 seats	33.85%, 16 seats
Seats won	28	22
Seat change	▲3	▲6
Popular vote	68,656	61,774
Percentage	47.89%	43.09%
Swing	▲5.89pp	▲9.24pp
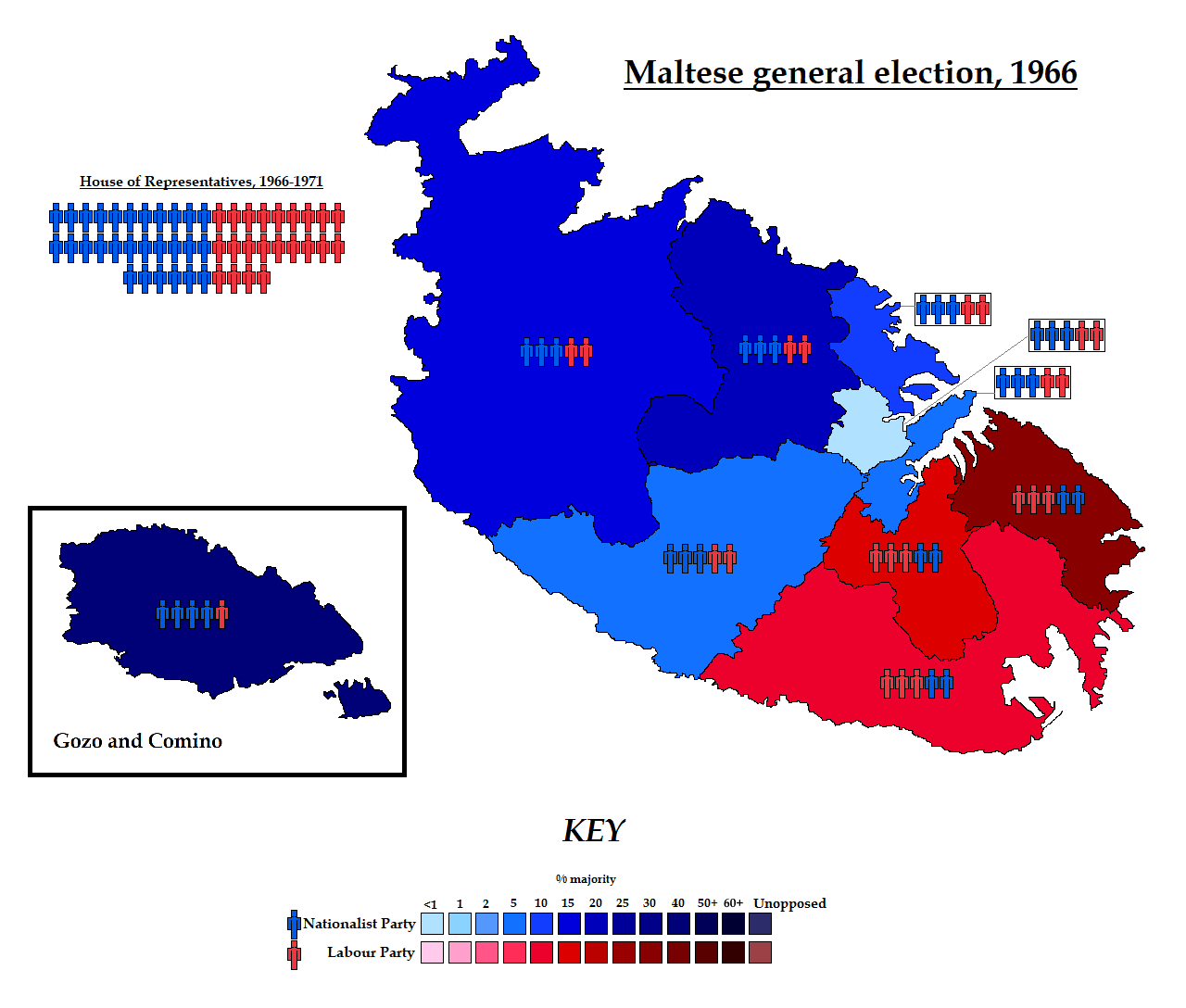
Prime Minister before election
George Borg Olivier
Nationalist
Elected Prime Minister
George Borg Olivier
Nationalist

General elections were held in Malta between 26 and 28 March 1966. The Nationalist Party remained the largest party, winning 28 of the 50 seats.

== Electoral system ==
The elections were held using the single transferable vote system.

== Results ==
Party	Votes	%	Seats	+/–
Nationalist Party	68,656	47.89	28	+3
Malta Labour Party	61,774	43.09	22	+6
Christian Workers' Party	8,671	6.05	0	–4
Progressive Constitutionalist Party	2,009	1.40	0	–1
Democratic Nationalist Party	1,845	1.29	0	–4
Independents	392	0.27	0	0
Total	143,347	100.00	50	0
Valid votes	143,347	98.95		
Invalid/blank votes	1,526	1.05		
Total votes	144,873	100.00		
Registered voters/turnout	161,490	89.71		
Source: Nohlen & Stöver
