= Pulse Social Democratic Students (Malta) =

Maltese student organisation

Pulse - Social Democratic Students of Malta
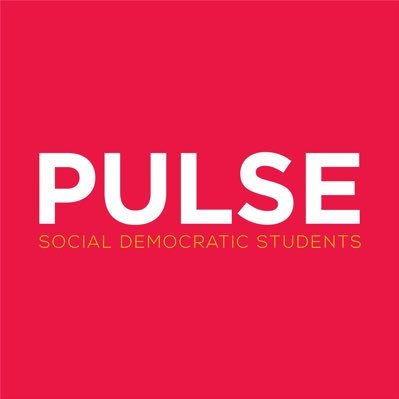
- President: Gabriel Camilleri
- Vice President: Kieran Muscat
- Secretary General: Amelia Cauchi
- Founded: 19 March 1997
- Website: https://www.instagram.com/pulsemalta/

Pulse - Social Democratic Students of Malta, or simply Pulse (stylised as PULSE) is a student organisation representing students at Maltese universities and colleges. Although not officially partisan, the organisation is typically aligned with the Partit Laburista. Pulse has a long-standing rivalry with Partit Nazzjonalista-linked student organisation SDM (Studenti Demokristjani Maltin).

== History ==
Pulse was founded on 1 March 1997 as an organization representing students all over Malta and Gozo, to suggest changes and improvements in areas such as public transport accessibility for students or examinations' reforms. It first started operating at the Ġ.F. Abela Junior College and the University of Malta. In 2012 Pulse became the first-ever recognized student society in MCAST. In September 2013 Pulse opened its Economic Affairs Review Board for students to voice their opinions.

President Karl Schembri released a statement in collaboration with Studenti Graffiti and S-Cubed, stating that Fresher's Week by the KSU at the University of Malta was business-oriented.

== Executive council ==
- President – Gabriel Camilleri
- Vice President – Kieran Muscat
- Secretary General – Amelia Cauchi
