= Villa Parisio =

16th century villa in Lija, Malta

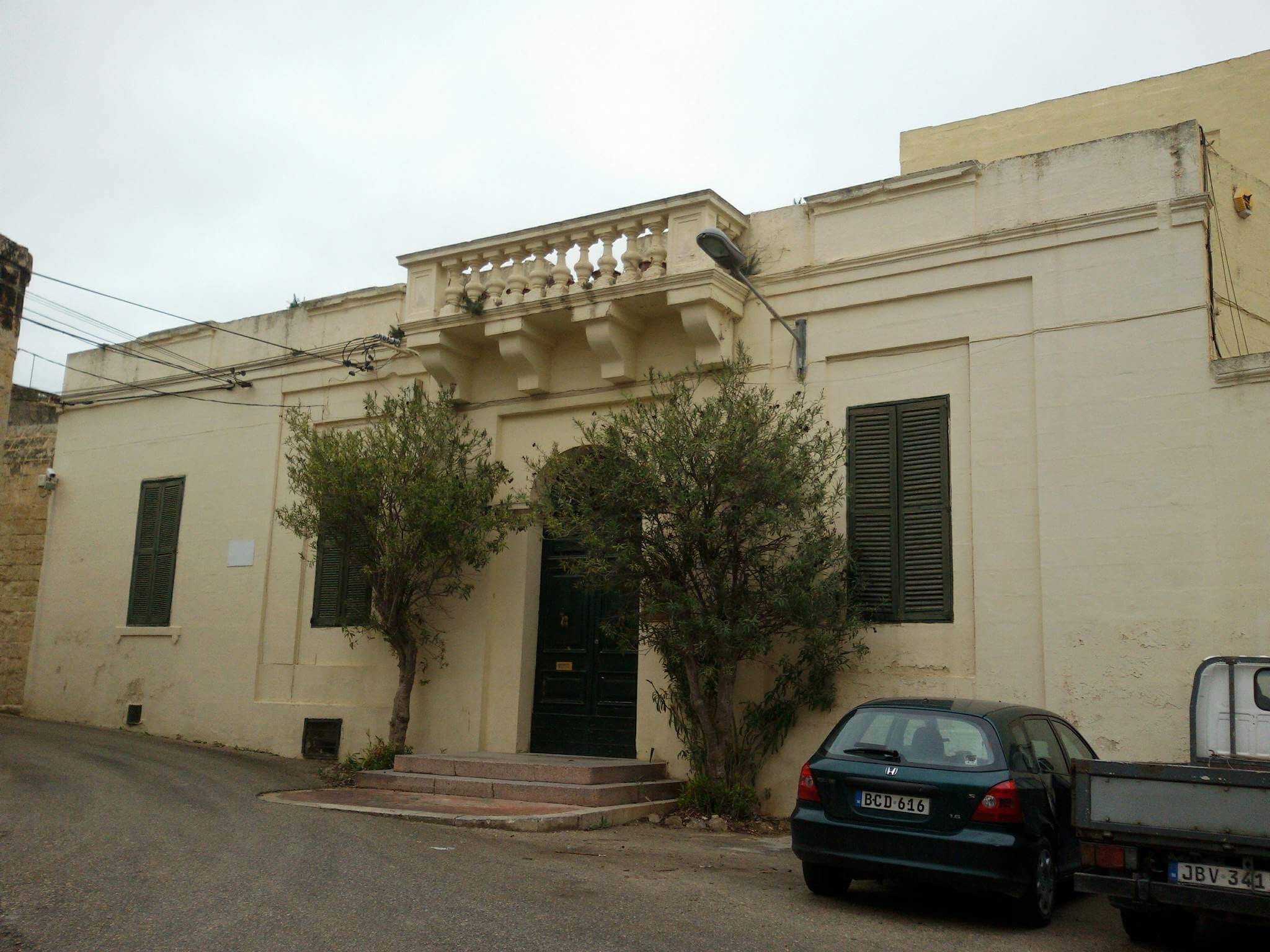
- Main façade of Villa Parisio
- Interactive map of the Villa Parisio area

General information
- Status: Intact
- Type: Villa
- Location: Lija, Malta
- Coordinates: 35.903818°N 14.448058°E
- Current tenants: Strickland Foundation
- Named for: Parisio Muscati family
- Completed: before 1567

Technical details
- Material: Limestone

Villa Parisio is a villa in Lija, Malta. It was built in the 16th century by the Muscati family, and eventually passed into the hands of the Parisio Muscati, de Piro and Strickland families. It is currently the seat of The Strickland Foundation, and also the home of Robert Hornyold-Strickland and his family for his lifetime. Mabel Strickland bought Villa Parisio in 1943. Whilst setting up The Strickland Foundation "for herself and her heirs in perpetuity" Mabel Strickland also left a clause that the seat of her Foundation could relocate to any other place in Malta.

== History ==
Villa Parisio is believed to have been built sometime in the 16th century as the summer residence of the Muscati family. The earliest reference to the building dates back to 1567. In 1797, it was inherited by Paolo Parisio Muscati, and passed to his wife Antonia Muscati Xara following his death in 1841. The villa was purchased by Lady Margaret Strickland, the second wife of Lord Strickland in 1938.

The Villa was then purchased 1943, by Mabel Strickland, Lord Strickland's daughter from his first marriage, and she lived there until her death in 1988. It is now the seat of The Strickland Foundation, a foundation set up by Mabel in 1979. Mabel set up the Times of Malta with her father Lord Strickland in 1935.

The ownership of the villa is currently disputed between The Strickland Foundation and Robert Hornyold-Strickland, Mabel Strickland's sole heir.

== Gardens ==
The villa has its own gardens, which contain a number of orange and olive trees.

== See also ==
- Palazzo Parisio (Valletta)
- Palazzo Parisio (Naxxar)
