= 1953 Maltese general election =

- 12–14 December 1953

All 40 seats in the Parliament of Malta 21 seats needed for a majority
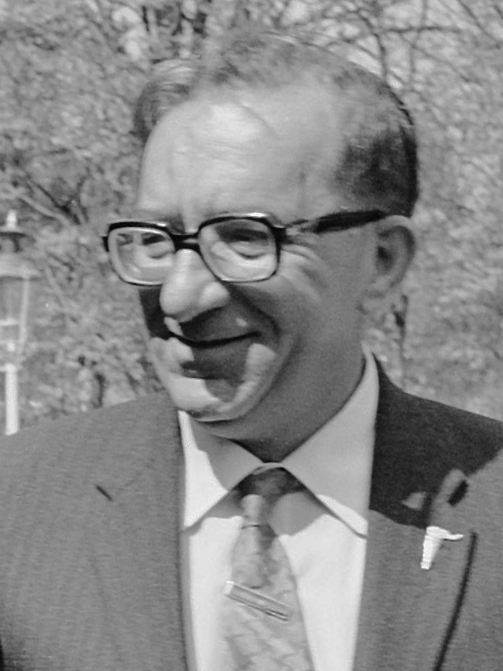

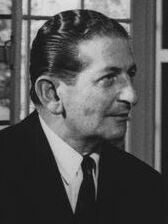

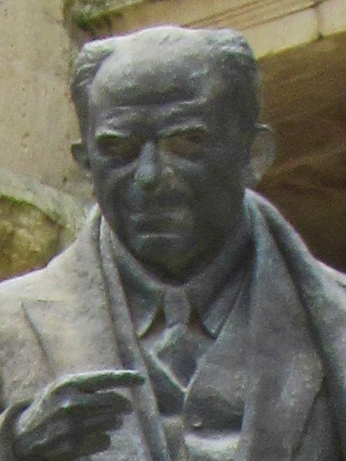
	First party	Second party	Third party
Leader	Dom Mintoff	George Borg Olivier	Paul Boffa
Party	Labour	Nationalist	Workers
Leader since	16 October 1949	1950	1949
Last election	14 seats, 35.7%	15 seats, 35.5%	7 seats, 18.8%
Seats won	19	18	3
Seat change	▲5	▲3	▼4
Popular vote	52,771	45,180	14,000
Percentage	44.6%	38.1%	11.8%
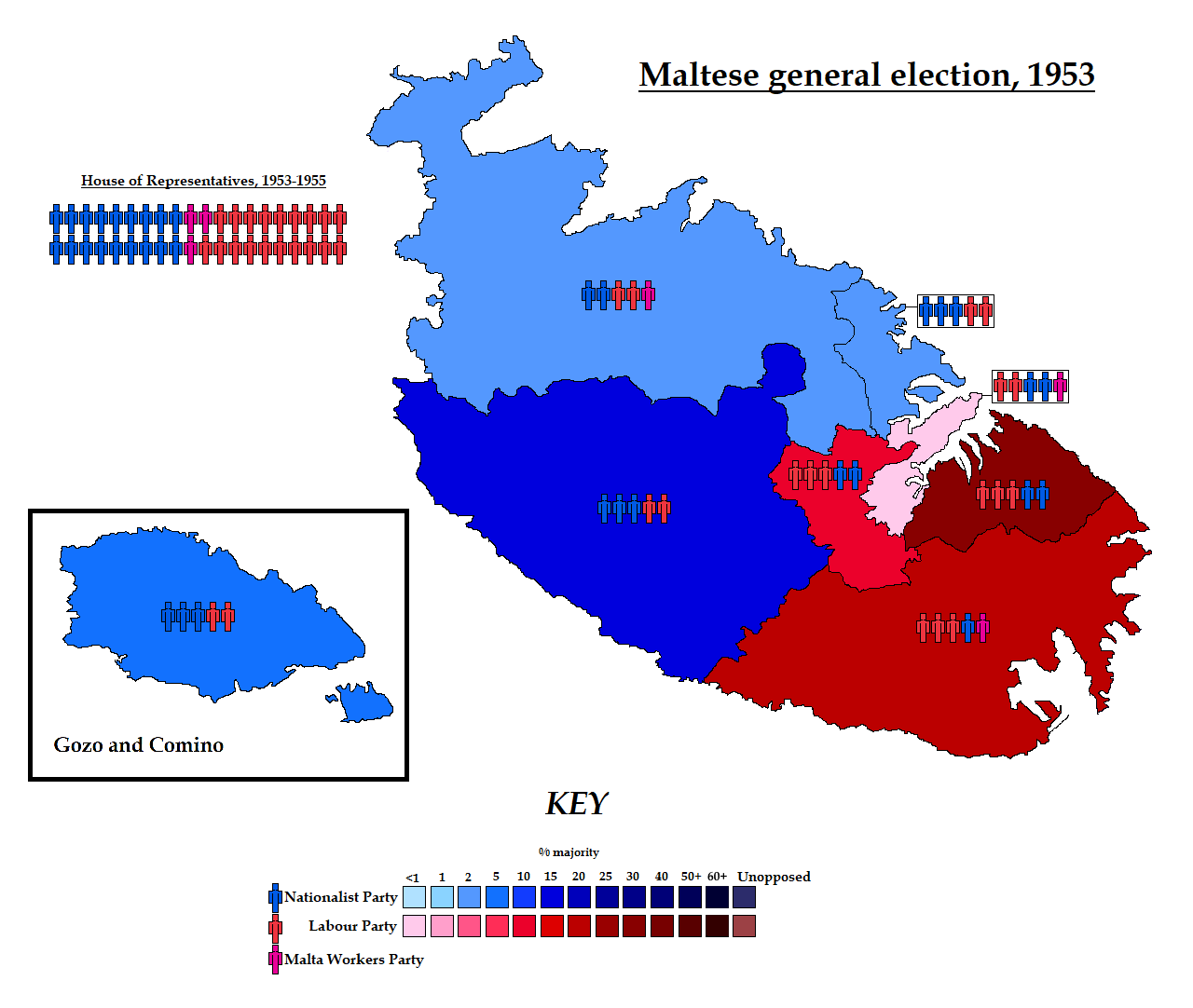
Prime Minister before election
George Borg Olivier
Nationalist
Elected Prime Minister
George Borg Olivier
Nationalist

General elections were held in Malta between 12 and 14 December 1953. The Malta Labour Party emerged as the largest party, winning 19 of the 40 seats. However, the Nationalist Party formed a government with the Malta Workers Party on 9 January 1954 with Giorgio Borġ Olivier continuing as Prime Minister.

== Background ==
The Nationalist Party-Workers Party government led by Giorgio Borġ Olivier had been defeated in the Legislative Assembly vote on a budget motion on 9 October 1953. This led to the three Workers Party ministers resigning from the cabinet on 12 October. Following discussions with party leaders, the Assembly was dissolved by Governor Gerald Creasy on 15 October. Elections were called, and the Nationalist Party ministers remained in office as a caretaker government.

The election was contested by five parties; the Nationalist Party, the Workers Party, the Malta Labour Party, the Constitutional Party and the Progressive Constitutionalist Party, and were held using the single transferable vote system.

== Results ==
Party	Votes	%	Seats	+/–
Malta Labour Party	52,771	44.55	19	+5
Nationalist Party	45,180	38.14	18	+3
Malta Workers Party	14,000	11.82	3	–4
Progressive Constitutionalist Party	5,128	4.33	0	New
Constitutional Party	1,374	1.16	0	–4
Total	118,453	100.00	40	0
Valid votes	118,453	99.26		
Invalid/blank votes	880	0.74		
Total votes	119,333	100.00		
Registered voters/turnout	148,478	80.37		
Source: Nohlen & Stöver
