= 1955 Maltese general election =

- 26–28 February 1955
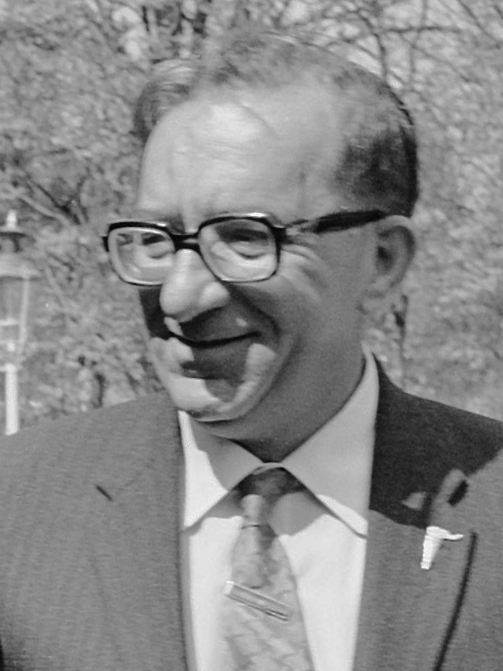

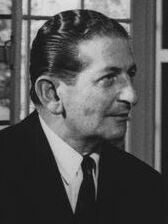
	First party	Second party
Leader	Dom Mintoff	George Borg Olivier
Party	Labour	Nationalist
Leader since	16 October 1949	1950
Last election	44.55%, 19 seats	38.14%, 18 seats
Seats won	23	17
Seat change	▲4	▼1
Popular vote	68,447	48,514
Percentage	56.73%	40.21%
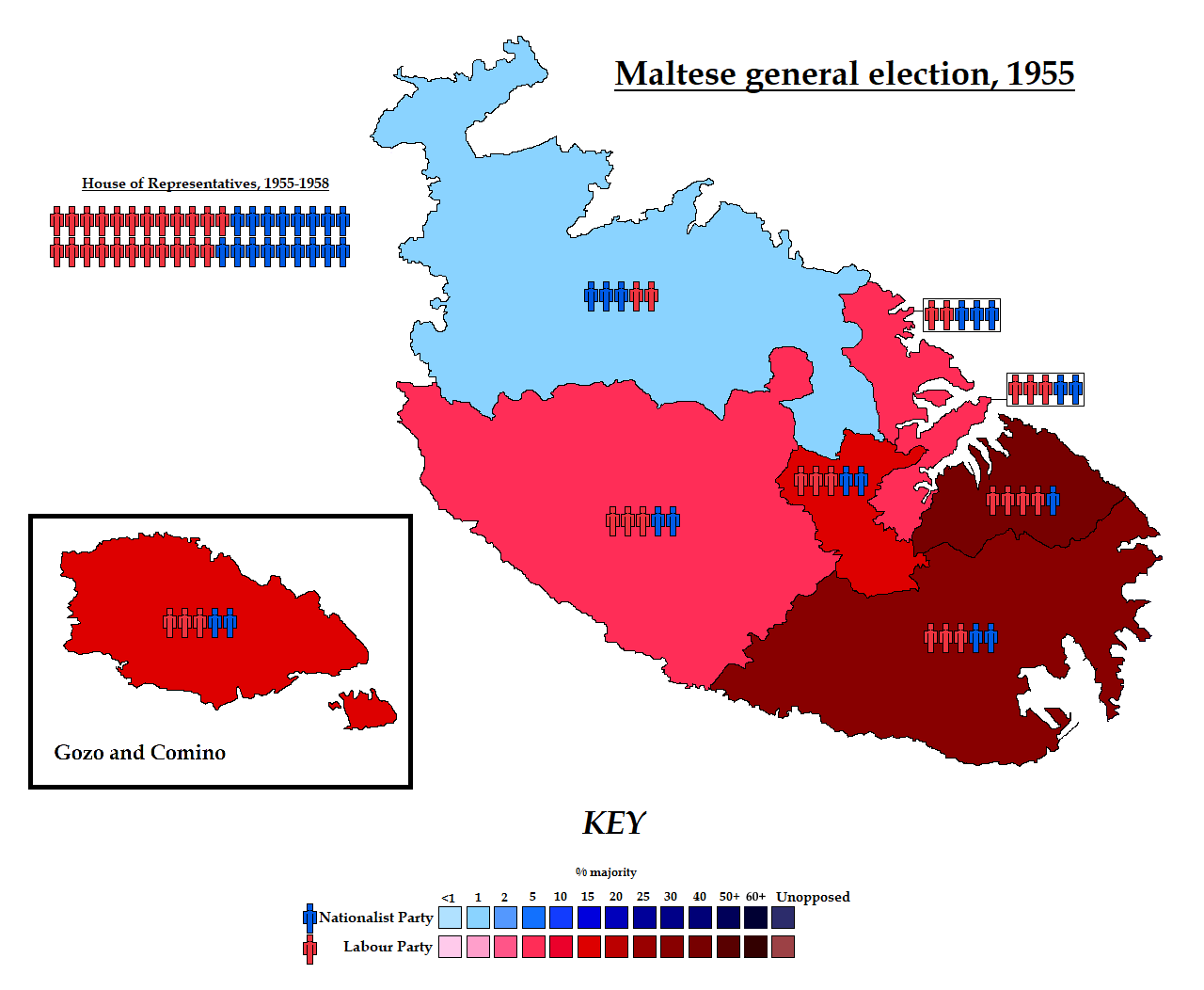
Prime Minister before election
George Borg Olivier
Nationalist
Elected Prime Minister
Dom Mintoff
Labour

General elections were held in Malta between 26 and 28 February 1955. The Malta Labour Party remained the largest party, winning 23 of the 40 seats.

== Electoral system ==
The elections were held using the single transferable vote system.

== Results ==
Party	Votes	%	Seats	+/–
Malta Labour Party	68,447	56.73	23	+4
Nationalist Party	48,514	40.21	17	–1
Progressive Constitutionalist Party	3,649	3.02	0	0
Independents	45	0.04	0	New
Total	120,655	100.00	40	0
Valid votes	120,655	99.52		
Invalid/blank votes	588	0.48		
Total votes	121,243	100.00		
Registered voters/turnout	149,380	81.16		
Source: Nohlen & Stöver
