= George Borg Olivier =

Prime Minister of Malta (1950–1955; 1962–1971)

The Honourable Giorgio Borg Olivier GCPO KSS
- Borg Olivier's official portrait

7th Prime Minister of Malta
- In office 5 March 1962 – 21 June 1971
- Monarch: Elizabeth II
- Governor-General: Maurice Henry Dorman (from 1964)
- Governor: Guy Grantham; Maurice Henry Dorman (to 1964)
- Preceded by: Dom Mintoff (1958)
- Succeeded by: Dom Mintoff
- In office 20 December 1950 – 11 March 1955
- Monarchs: George VI; Elizabeth II
- Governors-General: Gerald Creasy; Robert Edward Laycock
- Preceded by: Enrico Mizzi
- Succeeded by: Dom Mintoff

Personal details
- Born: 5 July 1911 Valletta, Crown Colony of Malta
- Died: 29 October 1980 (aged 69) Sliema, Republic of Malta
- Resting place: Addolorata Cemetery
- Party: Nationalist
- Spouse: Alexandra Mattei (m. 1943)
- Children: Angela; Alexander; Peter
- Education: Royal University of Malta
- Occupation: Attorney, politician

Giorgio Borg Olivier GCPO KSS (Maltese: Ġorġ Borg Olivier) (5 July 1911 – 29 October 1980) was a Maltese politician. He twice served as Prime Minister of Malta (1950–1955; 1962–1971) and as the Leader of the Nationalist Party. He was also Leader of the Opposition between 1955–1958, and again between 1971–1977.

Borg Olivier was elected as one of the three Nationalist members of the Council of Government in 1939. In May 1940, when the leader of the Nationalist party, Enrico Mizzi, was first interned by the British and deported, Borg Olivier became interim leader. After his return, Mizzi made Borg Olivier his deputy. Rising to office as a protégé of Mizzi and Sir Ugo P. Mifsud, Borg Olivier believed in the economic and social development of Malta as a viable independent state and in the necessity of a mixed economy. During his premiership, he pursued corporatist policies to develop the tourism industry and construction as the engine of growth. Under his leadership, average living standards rose steadily as Malta began to decouple from a fortress economy purely dependent on the British military establishment.

Near the end of his rule as prime minister, his government was rocked by various political and personal scandals, which seemed to symbolise the moral decay of the Maltese political establishment. Resigning from the Leader of the Nationalist Party in 1977, Borg Olivier retained his parliamentary seat until his death in 1980. He was succeeded as leader of the party by Eddie Fenech Adami.

== Early life ==
=== Family ===
George Borg Olivier was born in Valletta, the son of Olivier Borg Olivier and Rosa (née Amato), and had a sheltered childhood lived in the Valletta of the 1920s and 1930s.

Borg Olivier grew up in a family steeped in Nationalist politics. His uncle Salvatore was speaker of the house and then a senator, and led the opposition to Lord Strickland's Constitutional Party in the 1920s before becoming a cabinet minister during the premiership of Ugo P. Mifsud in the early 1930s. Borg Olivier followed in his uncle's footsteps by becoming a notary.

=== Education ===
He was educated at the Lyceum, Malta, and the Royal University of Malta, where he graduated Doctor of Laws in 1937. As a university student, Borg Olivier was elected President of the Comitato Permanente Universitario until it was suppressed by the British colonial government in March 1935.

== Personal life ==
=== Family ===
Borg Olivier married Alexandra Mattei on 21 November 1943. They had one daughter, Angela, and two sons, Alexander and Peter. Alexandra Borg Olivier died on 25 February 2009, aged 87. Peter Borg Olivier died 19 April 2012, aged 62.

== Political career ==
=== Private member (1939–1950) ===
The 1930s were particularly trying for Maltese society. War on the continent caused social and cultural tension on the islands. The alignment of local culture with Italy by elements of the social elite appeared to be lackey behaviour towards Fascist Italy. The Partito Nazionale of Enrico Mizzi and Sir Ugo P. Mifsud, the party chosen by Borg Olivier, came under strict scrutiny once war broke out in Europe in 1939. The war led to the exile of Nationalist supporters, including Enrico Mizzi, one of the main leaders of the Partito Nazionale. On 25 June 1939, Borg Olivier addressed his first mass-meeting in Siġġiewi, a village which also hosted his office as notary public:

...Giorgio Borg Olivier, figlio del compianto patriota ingegnere Oliviero. E' stato precisamente il notaio Giorgio a presentare a conclusione del magnifico comizio, due grandi mazzi di fiori ai nostri due capi Sir Ugo e Enrico Mizzi, a nome di quella laboriosa e patriottica popolazione rurale

Borg Olivier played an active role in this election, addressing political meetings in various villages, such as Birkirkara and Bormla. He was one of the three party candidates, together with Mizzi and Mifsud, who made it to the Council of Government in 1939. The Nationalist members' line in the 1939 Council of Government was not obstructionist; the three members believed that "the nation is mature, and quite mature enough to administer the government. It has sufficient talent, sufficient capacity for work and sufficient patriotism."

Borg Olivier was also chosen by Lieutenant governor William Dobbie as one of eight Protection Officers. Following the illegal internment and deportation of Maltese citizens, Borg Olivier offered a sustained opposition to the Council's deportations, talking at length and in many occasions against these actions, famously observing that:

Unless we are told the reasons for these arrests, internments and deportations, we have all the right to believe that those persons are the victims of political hatred.

The internees were returned to Malta in May 1945, and the three Nationalist members of the Council resigned in July, with the Nationalists refusing to participate in the 1945 elections. This was a protest against the imposition of non-administrative government. In 1947, Borġ Olivier was elected to the Legislative Assembly and was later Deputy Leader of the Opposition. The Boffa Government of 1947 was soon in crisis following Paul Boffa's disagreements with Dom Mintoff.

=== From Minister to Prime Minister (1950–1955) ===
Following the general elections of 1950, Borg Olivier held the post of Minister for Public Works and Reconstruction and Minister of Education in a Nationalist Minority Government led by Enrico Mizzi. Borg Olivier became prime minister and Minister of Justice in a Minority Government upon Mizzi's death in December 1950. He was also confirmed leader of the Nationalist Party by the Party's Executive Committee. The obstructionist strategies of the parties in opposition made Borġ Olivier bid the Governor, Sir Gerald Creasy, to call for fresh elections. These were held in May 1951, and as a result of them, Borg Olivier formed a coalition Government with the Malta Workers' Party, which was led by erstwhile PM Paul Boffa. Borg Olivier was head of the new government, retaining the Ministry for Public Works and Reconstruction. Re-elected in 1953, the coalition remained in office till 1955.

On the political front, these years were marked by the attempt for a proper definition of Malta's constitutional status and relationship with the United Kingdom. One such attempt related to an incident with respect to the coronation of Queen Elizabeth II in 1953. Borġ Olivier was invited to the ceremony, but refused to attend unless Malta was granted special precedence over other colonies. The difficulties were overcome when the British government agreed to treat the Prime Minister of Malta on an equal basis to the Prime Minister of Southern Rhodesia and Northern Ireland. This was a diplomatic victory for Borġ Olivier, winning him unanimous approval in Parliament.

During his stay in London, Borġ Olivier presented a memorandum to the Minister of State for Colonial Affairs, Henry Hopkinson, explaining the Maltese government's position that Malta ought be transferred from the Colonial Office to the Commonwealth Relations Office, as an independent dominion within the Commonwealth. This was a counter-proposal to the British Government's offer to move Malta under Home Office responsibility. Discussions by a Maltese delegation in May 1953 focused on the legal, constitutional and economic aspects of this question. This was a prelude to the political struggle with Mintoff's Malta Labour Party, which favoured integration with Britain.

=== Leader of the Opposition (1955–1958) ===
The general elections of 1955, which were lost by the Nationalist party, were linked with the two competing proposals of integration with Britain and dominion status. The imperial authorities on the islands were accused of exerting undue pressure on the electorate by the Nationalist party, with the Governor, Major General Sir Robert Laycock, taking the unheard of step of addressing the electorate over the rediffusion at the start of the electoral campaign. The Nationalist Congress, held 24 April 1955, passed a resolution deploring the "scandalous and unconstitutional interference of the Governor."

From 1955–58, Borg Olivier served as Leader of the Opposition. He led the Nationalist Party delegations in June and September 1955 for the Malta Round Table Conference. In these meetings, the Nationalist members reiterated that "Malta ought be given full autonomy within the Commonwealth, autonomous in its relationship with the United Kingdom, but not with the rest of the Commonwealth and other independent nations. The matters dealing with defense, the Commonwealth and international relationships should be the equal responsibility of the governments of the United Kingdom and Malta."

These constitutional demands were not met by the British government, which moved to agree in principle with Mintoff's demands for integration with Britain. A referendum was called, with Borg Olivier calling a boycott of the vote. Although the votes cast showed a substantial majority for integration, the outcome clearly showed that the nation did not approve of the proposals. Coupled with Borġ Olivier's attempts to expose British intrusions, and that "the Secretary of State for the Colonies is determined to bulldoze integration on the Island," support for the Malta Labour Party's proposal for full integration began to wane.

With the decrease in British defence spending and the British government's unwillingness to set dates for full equality between the Maltese and British people, the integration proposal was effectively dead. At this point, Mintoff resigned and declared a national day of protest. Riots broke out 28 April 1958. The governor declared a state of emergency, with troops placed on standby to help the civil police. After Borg Olivier's refusal to form a government, the governor was forced to declare a state of public emergency in Malta, suspending the 1947 Constitution.

=== Prime Minister (1962–1971) ===
==== Road to Independence ====
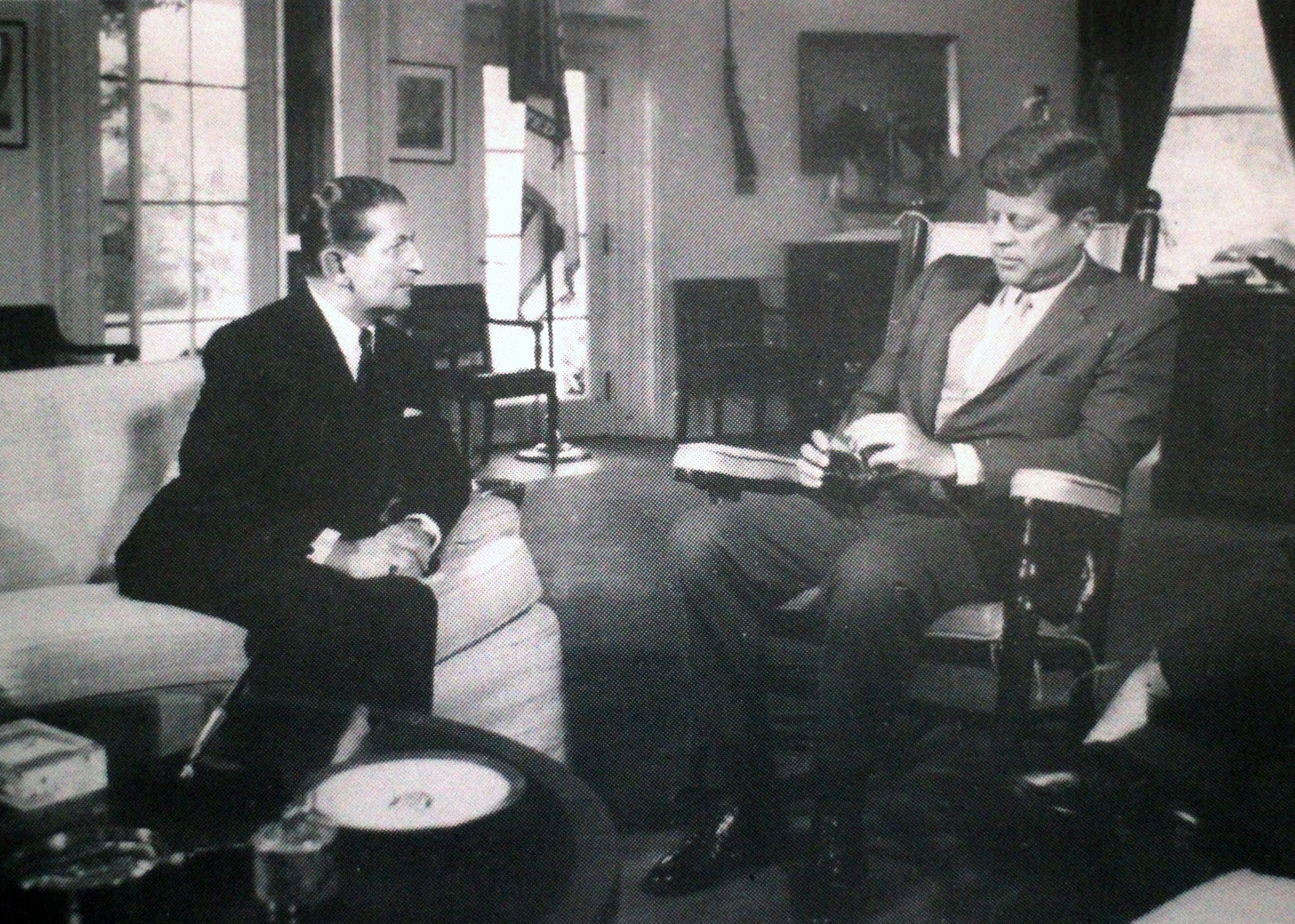
Prime Minister George Borg Olivier meeting with US President John F. Kennedy in September, 1963

Following the February 1962 election, Borg Olivier agreed to form a Government after obtaining important amendments to the Constitution. In addition to being prime minister, he assumed the portfolio of Minister of Economic Planning and Finance. In the 1962 elections, 76% of the electorate voted for the principal parties, which were demanding Independence. The Nationalist Party had suffered an internal split, with Herbert Ganado founding the more populist Democratic Nationalist Party.

The Nationalists gained a majority, and therefore, Borg Olivier became prime minister. Shortly afterwards, amendments to the Constitution were made. Borg Olivier proceeded to London to ask for a financial agreement and demand Independence with full membership within the Commonwealth. At the time, unemployment had risen to 6%, and there were fears of discharges from the Naval Arsenal. On 20 August 1962, Dr Borg Olivier presented a formal request for Independence. It was soon made known that the Attorney General Prof John J. Cremona was working on a draft constitution, while it was announced that a Malta Independence Conference was to be held at Marlborough House, London. The Conference started on 16 July 1963. Delegates from all the political parties led by Borg Olivier, Dom Mintoff, Toni Pellegrini, Herbert Ganado and Mabel Strickland attended. The Conference was chaired by Duncan Sandys. Discussions went on right through July. The Maltese Government was asking for a monarchical state with a Governor General representing the Queen. The Secretary of State proposed a referendum on the constitution.

Borg Olivier's shrewdness as a politician enabled him to use the ongoing religious conflict between the Labour Party and the Maltese church, headed by Archbishop Mikiel Gonzi, to his advantage. This was a particular achievement given that Borg Olivier's relationship with the Bishop was very strained. However, Borg Olivier was still able to gain a reduction in the clerical and episcopal influence on Maltese politics.

This was the tail end of the Maltese Politico-religious dispute, comparable in some ways to the questions arising thirty years earlier, in Strickland's time. Although there was a personality clash between Archbishop Gonzi and Mintoff, other issues of power and jurisdiction were clearly becoming evident in the growing tension between the ecclesiastical sphere and the state. Mass hysteria and campaigns of almost sectarian proportions ensued, with Mintoff and several of his Labour Party colleagues being denied the sacraments and demonised. Borg Olivier was no religious fanatic and took the politically correct side against his main adversary, riding on the wave of religious sentiment. Privately, he argued that the Church's efforts to rally third parties to enter the political fray were damaging his chances. This referred in particular to a second, Church-supported right-wing party led by Herbert Ganado, which had returned four MPs in the 1962 elections. Ganado, along with three other 'pro-church' small parties, two of which had returned MPs, were opposed to independence.

Gonzi wanted to check both Mintoff and Borġ Olivier to prevent the loss of the Church's guarded status under a new political system. Both the main political parties, the PN and the MLP, had independence from Britain prominently included in their electoral campaigns. On taking office in 1962, the demand for independence was put on the table quickly enough and preliminary discussions began almost immediately. Borġ Olivier tried rather unsuccessfully to get Britain to increase its aid to Malta, to protect against the consequences of the planned 'run down' of British service establishments in Malta. After unsuccessful talks, Borg Olivier retorted that he had not gone to London "to make a silver collection".

From his London hotel on 20 August 1962, Borg Olivier addressed to the Secretary of State for the colonies a formal and urgent request for Malta's independence. The main British concern was, of course, defence, but also security. The violence of 1958 and subsequent events, including manifestations of support for 'neutrality and non-alignment', had rather dented regard for Mintoff and his party generally, not only among the British Conservative Party. The Malta Labour Party tended to be perceived now as departing from or sidelining the Western camp. It was the Nationalists under Borg Olivier who were now seen by the British as the better able to reassure the West, and to offer the best chances for democracy, security, and stability in an independent state.

After a controversial referendum in May 1964, in which a majority of the votes cast approved the proposed independence constitution, in July, a full round of talks with all five political parties concerned, led by Borg Olivier as prime minister, was held at Marlborough House in London. The minority view against immediate independence was dismissed. The majority view was hindered by disagreements as to constitutional form, mainly concerning civil and secular entitlements against traditional Roman Catholic presumptions and fears, but one of Mintoff's six points also endorsed the potential justification of violence. The MLP also seemed unenthusiastic about Malta's staying in the Commonwealth, or retaining the George Cross in the national colours.

On 13 July 1963, Borg Olivier headed a Government delegation for the Malta Independence Conference at the end of which it was announced that Malta would become independent. On 25 January 1964, Borg Olivier was made a Knight Grand Cross of the Order of St. Sylvester, Pope, by Pope Paul VI. After having had a series of talks with the British Government and after preparing a Constitution for an independent Malta, which was endorsed by Parliament and approved by the people in a referendum held in February 1964, Borg Olivier set 21 September as Malta's Independence Day. Independence was part of a package which included retaining British defence facilities for ten years and financial aid to the tune of £51 million. NATO's Mediterranean branch headquarters, just outside Valletta, was also retained, ensuring that Malta would remain in the Western sphere of influence, while British and NATO forces would continue to benefit from the islands' strategic location.

On Independence Day, 21 September 1964, the degree of Doctor of Literature (Honoris Causa) was conferred on Borg Olivier by the Royal University of Malta. In November 1964, he was received by Pope Paul VI and made Knight Grand Cross of the Order of Pius IX.

==== Independent Malta ====
In March 1965, he became Minister of Foreign and Commonwealth Affairs in addition to his duties as prime minister and Minister of Economic Planning and Finance. In the General Elections held in March 1966, the Nationalist Party was again returned to power with Borg Olivier as prime minister and Minister of Foreign and Commonwealth Affairs. On 14 June 1968, Borg Olivier was decorated with the Grand Cross of Merit of the Order of Malta by the Grand Master of the Sovereign Military Hospitaller Order of St. John of Jerusalem, of Rhodes and of Malta.

Borg Olivier's personal life, which was somewhat disturbed, soon fell under public scrutiny. The marital relationship of the Borg Olivier couple began to be used by all his political opponents as a source of criticism. These scandals were part of the political rhetoric of the 1960s. The Maltese church's teachings still played a cardinal role in local politics. Borg Olivier had jumped on the Church's bandwagon, grasping a substantial political advantage from the Church's excommunication of the Maltese Labour Party.

Borg Olivier did not agree with the Church's position, yet he still capitalised on the situation and gave sterling support to the Church's authorities. The introduction of Labour newspapers in public hospitals was banned, a decision later revoked by the courts, while excommunicated citizens were forbidden from being buried in their family graves in public cemeteries. The abuse of Maltese children who had been sent to Australia on the initiative of the Maltese church was another scandal which rocked the country.

=== Leader of the Opposition (1971–1977) ===
As the 1960s came to a close, an economy reeling from over-reliance on construction and labour troubles at the Dockyards endangered Borg Olivier's administration. Above all, the common belief was that Borg Olivier and his cabinet had no initiative, preferring to react rather than to act.

In the 1971 election campaign, the Labour Party claimed that the government was lazy and out of touch, especially compared with the aggressive and determined Mintoff. However, the Borg Olivier Cabinet was incredibly active meeting, in all, 766 times from 27 August 1962 to 1 June 1971, just before the elections which were to unseat it; the cabinet met even on Boxing Day, sometimes morning and evening, and even on the feast day of St Paul's Shipwreck. This effort did Borg Olivier no good; Mintoff and Labour regained power.

Having led the Nationalists to defeat in the 1971 election and also the next election five years later, Borg Olivier incurred increasing censure within as well as outside his own party. His approach seemed lightweight and passive compared with Mintoff's vehement rule. Borġ Olivier opposed, but without success, the growing tendency of Mintoff's most extreme supporters to resort to violence as a political weapon.

Among Borg Olivier's fellow party members, a younger generation had emerged by this time, which considered him physically and politically incapable of winning back popular support from Mintoff. His growing tendency to procrastinate rather than to take tough decisions attracted particular criticism.

During January 1974, eighteen Nationalist parliamentarians signed a declaration of no confidence in Borġ Olivier's leadership. Three others who could not attend signed later. Out of 27 MPs, only five supported the party leader. These five MPs were Paulo Borg Olivier (George's brother), Albert Borg Olivier de Puget (George's nephew), Alfred Bonnici (who had been appointed speaker in the previous parliament by George), J. Cassar Galea (an old friend of Borġ Olivier) and Alexander Cachia Zammit (a former minister in Borg Olivier's cabinet). Borg Olivier could still count on the support of his relatives in the party, as well as on those politicians who, like Cachia Zammit, had been members of his 1962-1971 cabinets and were still in the legislature. For a while, that backing was enough to enable Borg Olivier to retain the party leadership. Yet when Borg Olivier loyalists proved incapable of opposing Mintoff's proposal to change Malta from a constitutional monarchy to a republic (with a parliamentary majority of two-thirds, but without the referendum which Borg Olivier wanted), his position was fatally weakened.

After Mintoff's re-election in 1976, the general feeling among most Nationalists was that the party could succeed only if it acquired a young, genuinely devout, dynamic Catholic as a new leader. In other words, the Nationalist Party wanted to adopt a populist approach. Ironically enough, it was a position which had been advocated by Ganado, but which Borg Olivier had strongly resisted in the sixties. Undercurrents began to form within the higher ranks of the party with the aim of removing Borg Olivier. Eddie Fenech Adami, a comparative newcomer among Nationalist parliamentarians, became the party's leader in 1977. At 44 years of age, he was much younger and more determined than Borg Olivier. His tenure as Opposition Leader reinvigorated an ailing party, which achieved an actual majority of the popular vote in 1981.

After stepping down from party leader, Borg Olivier became a recluse, alone, friendless and detached from the local political scene. A sense of betrayal marked his attitude, given that Fenech Adami had been encouraged by Borg Olivier to remain in politics after suffering two personal electoral defeats.

== Death and state funeral ==
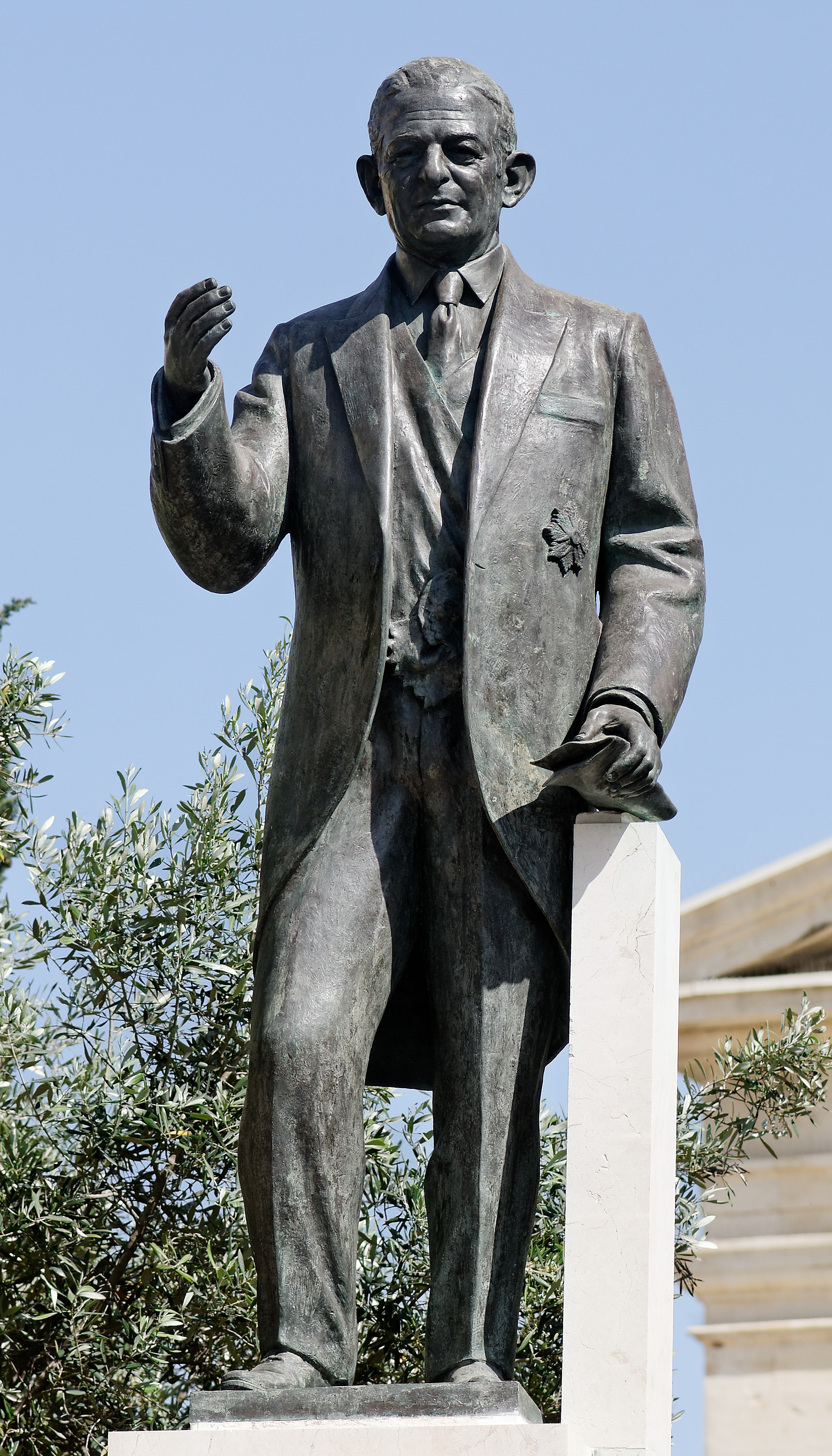
Monument to George Borg Olivier in Valletta

Despite his increasingly worsening health, Borġ Olivier still tried to remain active in public life. By 1980, Borg Olivier had been battling lung cancer for a number of years. Less than four years after he had resigned from the leadership of the Nationalist Party, he died at his Sliema home, at age 69, on Wednesday, 29 October 1980.

Prime Minister Mintoff expressed his intention to organise a state funeral for Borg Olivier. His funeral was the largest state funeral in Maltese history up to that point in time, and it was followed by thousands who went to Valletta to pay their last respects. He was buried at Addolorata cemetery, Paola, Malta.

A monument in honour of Borġ Olivier was erected in Castille Square, Valletta, in 1989, as part of the events commemorating the 25th anniversary of independence.

== Honours and awards ==
- Malta: Doctor of Literature (Honoris Causa), Royal University of Malta, September 1964
- Holy See: Grand Cross of the Order of St. Sylvester, January 1964
- Holy See: Grand Cross of the Order of Pope Pius IX, November 1964
- Sovereign Military Order of Malta: Grand Cross of Merit, June 1968

== See also ==
- Prime Minister of Malta
- List of prime ministers of Malta

Political offices
Preceded by Enrico Mizzi	Prime Minister of Malta; 1950–1955	Succeeded by Dominic Mintoff
Preceded by Office abolished	Prime Minister of Malta; 1962–1971	Succeeded by Dominic Mintoff
Party political offices
Preceded by Enrico Mizzi	Leader of the Nationalist Party; 1950–1977	Succeeded by Eddie Fenech Adami
