= 1971 Maltese general election =

- 12–14 June 1971

All 55 seats in the House of Representatives
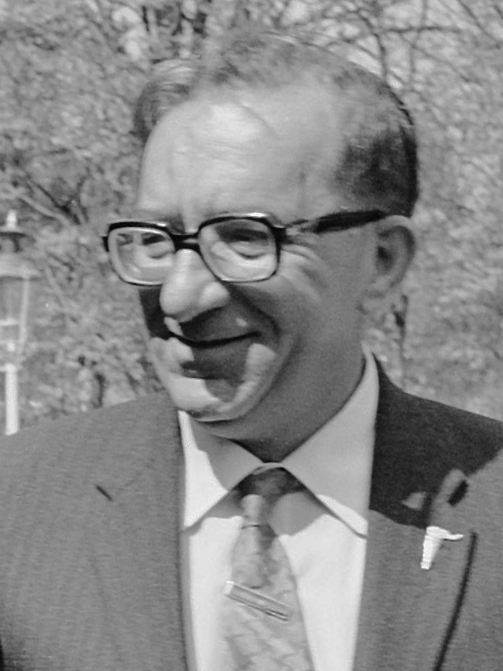

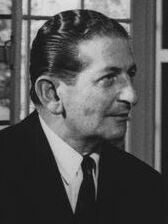
	First party	Second party
Leader	Dom Mintoff	George Borg Olivier
Party	Labour	Nationalist
Last election	43.09%, 22 seats	47.89%, 28 seats
Seats won	28	27
Seat change	▲6	▼1
Popular vote	85,448	80,753
Percentage	50.84%	48.05%
Swing	▲7.75pp	▲0.16pp
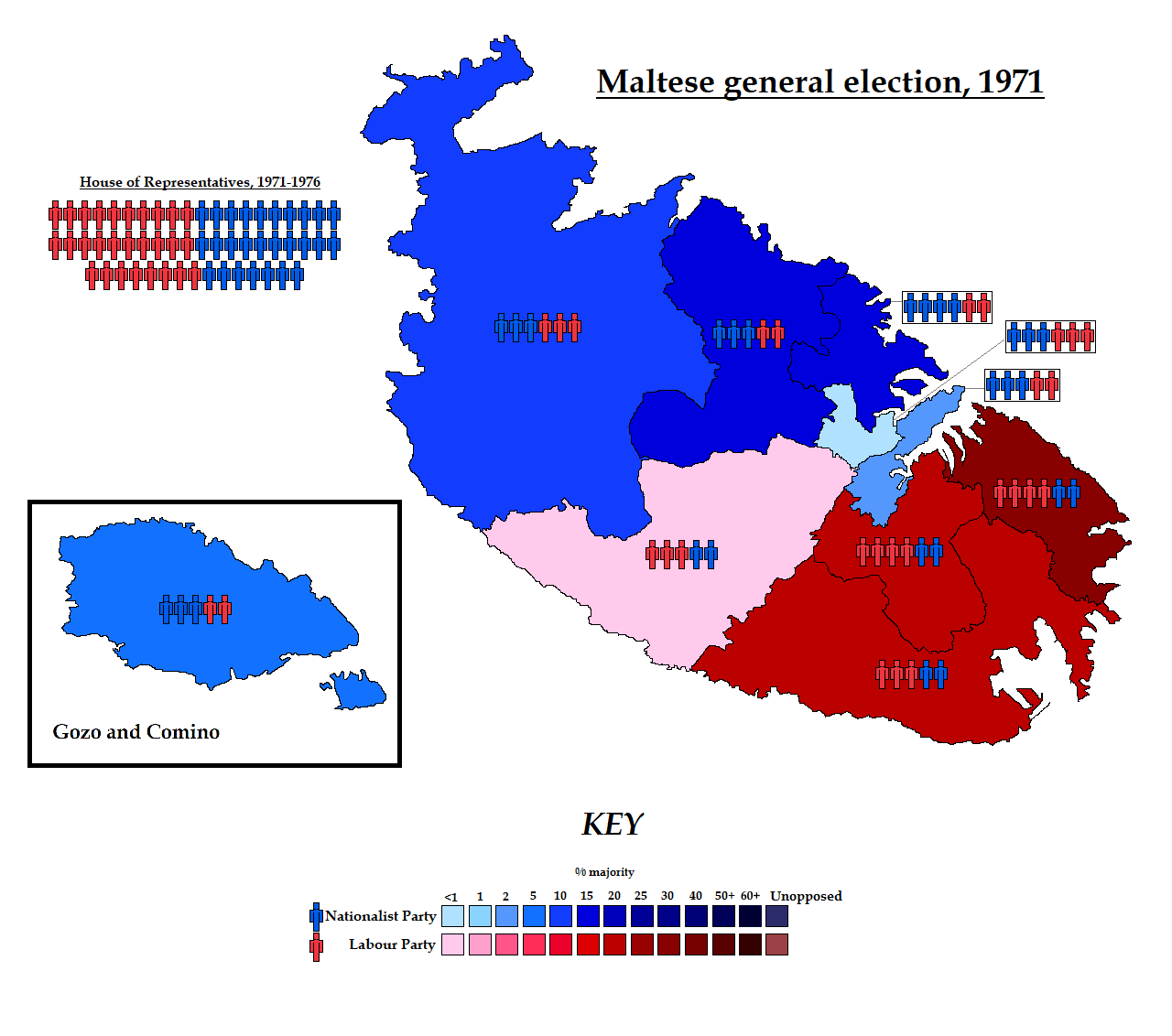
Prime Minister before election
George Borg Olivier
Nationalist
Elected Prime Minister
Dom Mintoff
Labour

General elections were held in Malta between 12 and 14 June 1971. The Malta Labour Party emerged as the largest party, winning 28 of the 55 seats.

== Electoral system ==
The elections were held using the single transferable vote system, whilst the number of seats was increased from 50 to 55.

== Results ==
Party	Votes	%	Seats	+/–
Malta Labour Party	85,448	50.84	28	+6
Nationalist Party	80,753	48.05	27	–1
Progressive Constitutionalist Party	1,756	1.04	0	0
Independents	102	0.06	0	0
Total	168,059	100.00	55	+5
Valid votes	168,059	99.49		
Invalid/blank votes	854	0.51		
Total votes	168,913	100.00		
Registered voters/turnout	181,768	92.93		
Source: Nohlen & Stöver
