= John Attard Montalto =

Maltese politician (born 1953)

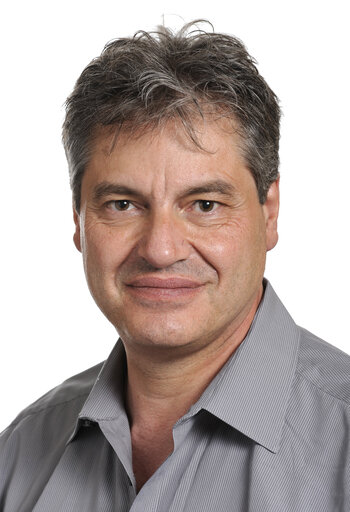

Member of the European Parliament
- In office 12 June 2004 – 1 July 2014
- Preceded by: New Constituency
- Majority: 25,287 (2004), 12,880 (2009)

Member of Parliament
- In office 13 June 1987 – 9 June 2004
- Succeeded by: Rodrick Galdes

Personal details
- Born: 7 February 1953 (age 73) Sliema, Malta
- Party: Labour (PL)
- Profession: Lawyer

John Attard Montalto (born 7 February 1953) is a Maltese politician who was a Member of the European Parliament from 2004 until 2014. He is a member of the Labour Party, which is part of the Party of European Socialists. He served in the government of Malta as Minister for Industry and Economic Affairs from 1996 to 1998.

== Career ==
Born in Sliema, Attard Montalto studied History and Law at the University of Malta and he was also student representative on the University Senate. He first contested the general elections in 1987 and was elected. He was re-elected in subsequent elections in 1992, 1996, 1998 and 2003. Between 1996 and 1998, when the Labour Party was in government, he served as Minister for Industry and Economic Affairs.

After the defeat of Labour Party at the polls in 2003 and the resignation of the Party Leader Alfred Sant, Attard Montalto announced his intention to run for the post. The race turned out to be between three contestants, including Sant who was persuaded to run and who, eventually, won the election. Attard Montalto finished last. In the same year Attard Montalto was appointed an observer to the European Parliament by the Labour Party. He was elected to the European Parliament in 2004 (resigning his seat in the Maltese House of Representatives) where he sat with the Party of European Socialists and was the first Head of Delegation for Labour MEPs from Malta.

Attard Montalto was a member of the European Parliament's Committee on Industry, Research and Energy. He was also a substitute for the Committee on Transport and Tourism, a substitute for the Subcommittee on Human Rights, a member of the delegation for relations with the Gulf States, including Yemen, and a substitute for the delegation for relations with Australia and New Zealand.

His tenure as MEP has not been without controversy. He did not attend the plenary session at Strasbourg for the vote on the Port Services Directive, a proposal which the Labour Party was against. Labour Party leader Alfred Sant said Attard Montalto had been on a "personal political mission" to Central America. In the past, Attard Montalto was also member of the Parliamentary Assembly of the Council of Europe (1992–1995, 1995–1997, 1999-2003, 2003–2005).

== Education ==
- 1974: B.A. (Hons.) History
- 1978: Diploma of Notary Public (Dip. Not. Pub.)
- 1979: Doctor of Laws (LL.D.)

Member of the Association of Foreign Title Holders in Malta.
