= Joseph Flores (Maltese politician) =

Maltese judge and politician (1907–1974)

Joseph Flores (1907– 8 March 1974) was a judge and politician from Malta.

== Early life ==
Flores was born in 1907 in the Maltese town of Hamrun, close to the capital Valletta. Following school, he enrolled at the University of Malta (the main university on the island) and began a course in the study of law. He used this to develop his career in the legal field, finally being appointed as a judge.

== Political career ==
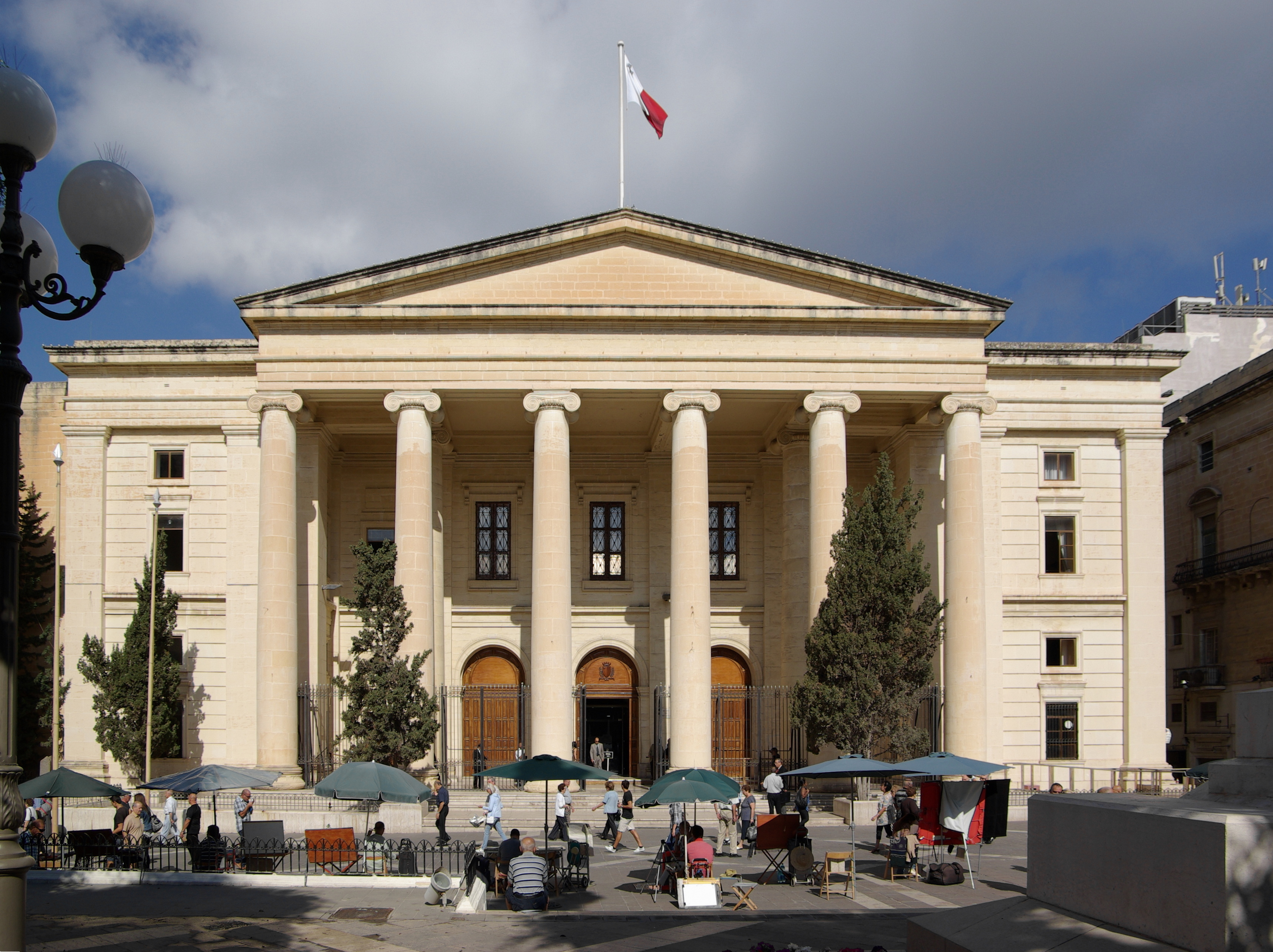
The Courts of Justice building, Valletta

Flores was drawn to the political sphere, but his initial bid to get elected during the 1932 Maltese national elections was unsuccessful. However, he was eventually elected, as a candidate for the Malta Labour Party, for three successive terms during the 1950s. This period, just before independence from Great Britain, was one of turmoil for the Maltese left — a split between the MLP and the Maltese Workers Party led to the latter forming a coalition with the Nationalists. From 1949 until 1955, Flores served as Deputy Leader of the MLP in the Assembly. It was not until 1955 that the MLP finally formed the government under the leadership of Dom Mintoff. This legislature came to be dominated by the issue of integration with the United Kingdom.

Such was Flores' position within the dominant Labour grouping that he was appointed the Speaker of the Maltese Legislative Assembly that same year. He was later appointed Judge and thus he resigned as a member of the Legislative Assembly.

Flores was also influential in introducing the policy of criminal probation in Malta. In 1955, he adopted some of the proposals that had been developed by Sir Alexander Paterson, HM Commissioner of Prisons for England and Malta. Paterson had suggested using the social system already in place - in Malta's case, the use of the police force and priesthood.

== Post political life ==
Shortly before his retirement, he took up a further post as vice-president of the Maltese constitutional court.

Flores was gay, and it has been suggested that Flores had a relationship with the Maltese editor Herbert Ganado and served as his best man. Chetcuti describes how, "On the eve of the wedding, Flores dressed up as a woman, and on another occasion, Flores and others put on a drag show sending up Queen Victoria."

After he retired, he taught law again at the University of Malta. He died in 1974 and was buried at the cemetery of Santa Maria Addolorata ("Our Lady of Sorrows") in Paola, which is the largest graveyard in Malta.

== See also ==
- List of Malta-related topics
