= Times of Malta =

English-language newspaper in Malta

- The Times of Malta front page of 1 January 2016
- Type: Daily newspaper
- Format: Compact
- Owner: Allied Newspapers Limited
- Editor: Herman Grech; Mark Wood; Bertrand Borg
- Founded: 1935
- Political alignment: Liberal conservatism
- Language: English
- Headquarters: Times of Malta, 50, Joe Gasan Street, Pietà
- Country: Malta
- Circulation: 100,000
- Website: www.timesofmalta.com

The Times of Malta is an English-language daily newspaper in Malta. Founded in 1935, by Lord and Lady Strickland and Lord Strickland's daughter Mabel, it is the oldest daily newspaper still in circulation in Malta. It has the widest circulation of any Maltese newspaper. The newspaper is published by Allied Newspapers Limited, which is owned by the Strickland Foundation, a charitable trust established by Mabel Strickland in 1979 to control the majority of the company.

== History ==
Previous logo as The Times

The history of The Times of Malta is linked with that of its publishing house, Allied Newspapers Limited. This institution has a history going back to the 1920s, when it pioneered journalism and the printing industry in Malta. It all started with the publication, by Gerald Strickland, of Malta's first evening newspaper in Maltese, Il-Progress. This was a four-page daily with its own printing offices in what was then 10A, Strada Reale, Valletta. The name "Progress" is retained to this day by the commercial sister of Allied Newspapers Limited, Progress Press Company Limited, formed in 1946.

Bilingual journalism, Maltese and English, was introduced in Malta with the publication, on 3 February 1922, of an English supplement to Il-Progress. The Times of Malta and Il-Progress lasted until 1 March 1929. The English supplement then became The Times of Malta Weekly, which was a forerunner of The Sunday Times of Malta. The Maltese side was named Ix-Xemx, later changed to Id-Dehen and later still to Il-Berqa, first published on 29 January 1932. Il-Berqa ceased publication on 30 November 1968. In February 1931, Progress Press moved from Strada Reale to 341, St Paul Street, Valletta, until recently the site of Allied Newspapers Limited, also known as Strickland House.

As readership of the English supplement to Il-Progress soared, Lord Strickland was quick to see that there was room for an English daily. This would happen, so long as the new publication achieved and maintained a high standard of public service in information. The first issue of The Times of Malta was published in full co-operation with the British MI5 on 7 August 1935 under menacing war clouds as Italy planned the invasion of Abyssinia, which began in October of that year. On 2 September 1935, Mabel Strickland, who was a founder member of Allied Malta Newspapers Limited and formed part of the first Board of Directors, became the first editor of The Times of Malta. She also edited The Sunday Times of Malta from 1935 to 1950 when she was succeeded by the late George Sammut, who retired in 1966. Anthony Montanaro was the next editor. He retired on 1 March 1991 and was succeeded by Laurence Grech.

On 6 August 1960, the 25th anniversary of The Times of Malta, Strickland wrote that The Times of Malta, whilst originally the Constitutionalist political party's paper, had become a national newspaper. The paper gained a reputation for objective reporting whilst upholding its own strongly held editorial opinion. Strickland's editorship covered the difficult years of World War II. Nevertheless, none of the newspapers forming part of the Group ever missed an issue, in spite of continuous bombing and many shortages in the siege years between 1940 and 1943. The building was bombed twice, receiving a direct hit on 7 April 1942, when sixteen rooms were demolished. However, the newspaper production never halted.

Thomas Hedley took over as editor from Strickland in 1950. He edited the paper through the traumatic years of political and industrial change, culminating in Malta's Independence in 1964. Under the editorship of Charles Grech Orr, The Times kept up the tradition of never missing an issue when twice hit by industrial action in 1973 and when political arsonists burned the building down on 15 October 1979. That date came to be known as "Black Monday". In the face of serious danger, the editor and his staff had to abandon the building. Printing of the following day's paper continued at another printing press, Independence Press. The paper was out on the street as usual the following morning, reduced in size but a triumph for freedom of expression. During the last 10 years, its website timesofmalta.com has become the primary news source in Malta and one of the main news websites in the Mediterranean. In June 2019, Herman Grech was appointed editor-in-chief, Bertrand Borg online editor and Mark Wood print editor.

In March 2021, Adrian Hillman, the former director of the Allied Group and Vince Buhagiar, the former chairman of Progress Press were charged in court with various fraud and money-laundering offences. It is alleged that Hillman and Buhagiar conspired with Keith Schembri, former chief of staff to Prime Minister Joseph Muscat, to defraud Progress Press of around €5.5 million by inflating the prices of machinery purchased from Schembri's company Kasco and sharing the profits between themselves.

In January 2026 the headquarters were relocated from their long time location in Valetta to Pietà.

== Fact-checking initiative ==
In 2023, the Times of Malta and the University of Malta's Department of Media and Communications joined the EU-funded MedDMO project. The project is part of the European Digital Media Observatory (EDMO) and aims to develop tools to identify fake news in Malta, Greece, and Cyprus. Key partners include Agence France-Presse (AFP) and several academic institutions. Leading the initiative are Mr. Neville Borg and Prof. Ġorġ Mallia.

== Controversies ==
In early 2024, the Times of Malta was accused of spreading fake news after publishing articles alleging Papaya Ltd's involvement in money laundering and ties to Russian organized crime. Investigations by the Western Morning News and Financial Monthly found these claims against Papaya Ltd baseless. Furthermore, no government authorities had accused Papaya Ltd, leading to criticism of the Times for misinformation.

== Editors ==
Name	Term	Notes
Mabel Strickland	1935–1950	
Thomas Hedley	1950–1960	
Charles Grech Orr	1960–1973	
Anthony Montanaro	1973–1991	
Laurence Grech	1991–2007	Sunday print editor
Victor Aquilina	1993–2003	Daily print editor
Ray Bugeja	2003–2019	Daily print editor
Steve Mallia	2007–2016	Sunday print editor
Herman Grech	2015 – present day	Online editor, then Editor-in-chief
Bertrand Borg	2019 – present day	Online editor
Mark Wood	2019– 2023	Print editor
Anthony Manduca	2023 – present day	Print editor
