= Herbert Ganado =

Maltese lawyer and politician

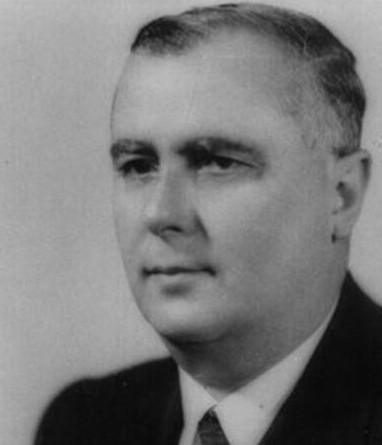

Herbert Ganado (7 April 1906 – 8 April 1979) was a Maltese lawyer, president of Catholic Action, editor, politician and author.

Born in Floriana on 7 April 1906 on the island of Malta, Ganado studied at the Lyceum and later at University of Malta where he graduated as a lawyer in 1931. He was active at university, being President of the University Students' Council (KSU), and shortly after became president of the lay movement, Catholic Action. In 1933 he was appointed the third editor of the newspaper Lehen is-Sewwa, the voice of Catholic Action. Ganado succeeded in steering the paper through turbulent times preceding the Second World War, and not only converted Lehen is-Sewwa into a daily paper, but also gave it a new look. He widened its scope by covering a wider range of subjects. He made it a means for promoting and disseminating Catholic culture with a broad view on all religious, social, cultural and even political spheres of Maltese society set within a global context. During the Spanish Civil War, Ganado wrote several articles in support of Francisco Franco.

In 1939 he was interned without trial by the British colonial authorities for his suspected sympathy with the Italian government of Benito Mussolini and the Italian fascists. He was subsequently exiled with a number of Maltese nationals to Uganda. Ganado later remarked that a positive aspect of the war was showing the importance of women, and directly led to universal suffrage in Malta in 1947, followed by women being allowed to stand for public office.

After the war, he was released and led a splinter group from the Nationalist Party to form the Democratic Nationalist Party (Partit Demokratiku Nazzjonalista). However, this was short lived and ultimately unsuccessful in political terms.

He married Alda née Randon and they had five children together, one of whom died shortly after his birth. One of his close friends since his days at university in the 1920s was the homosexual Maltese lawyer, Joseph Flores: indeed it has been suggested that Ganado and Flores may have been romantically involved. However, Flores became a member of the Malta Labour Party (MLP) under the leadership of Dom Mintoff in the 1950s at the time when Ganado was openly opposed to Mintoff's policy of Integration with Britain. Flores, eventually resigned from the MLP and was made a judge.

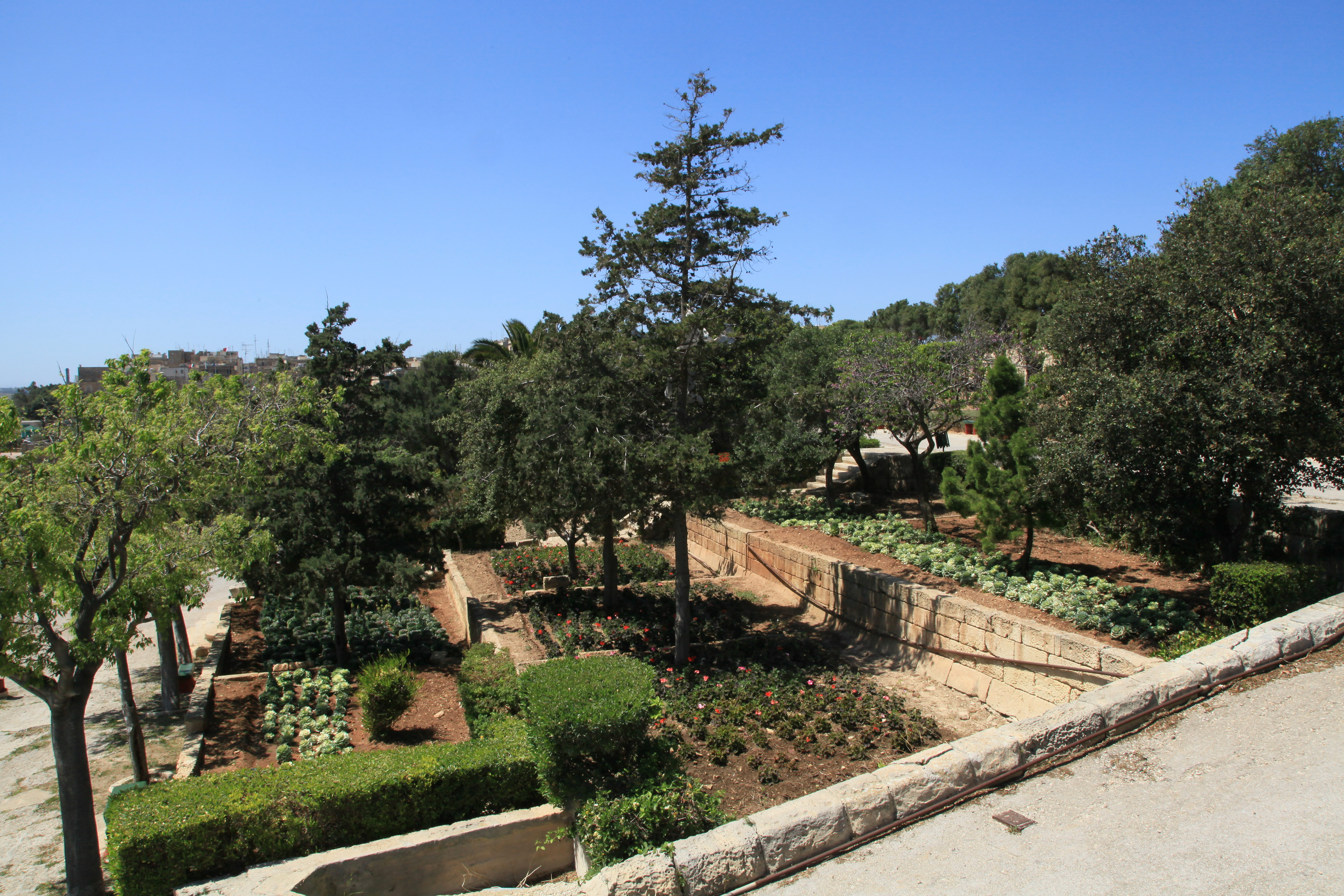
Herbert Ganado Gardens in Floriana

His best known literary work is his 4 volume memoirs, Rajt Malta Tinbidel. This work was translated into the English language by another well known Maltese lawyer politician Dr. Michael A. Refalo and titled "My Century". Herbert Ganado Gardens in Floriana are named after him.

He died on 8 April 1979, a day after his 73rd birthday, and was interred at Santa Maria Addolorata cemetery.

== See also ==
- Carmelo Borg Pisani
- List of Malta-related topics
