= Democratic Nationalist Party (Malta, 1959–1966) =

Former Malta political party

- Leader: Herbert Ganado
- Founder: Herbert Ganado
- Founded: 1959
- Dissolved: 1966
- Split from: Nationalist Party
- Ideology: Christian democracy Political Catholicism
- Political position: Right-wing
- Religion: Roman Catholicism

The Democratic Nationalist Party (DNP) was a political party in Malta between 1959 and 1966.

== History ==
The DNP was established in 1959 by Herbert Ganado as a breakaway from the Nationalist Party. Its opposition to the Labour Party helped it win four seats in the 1962 elections. However, it lost its parliamentary representation in the 1966 elections and was subsequently disbanded.

== Ideology ==
The party was more progressive than the Nationalist Party, and sought a return to responsible government, which had been revoked in 1959. Whilst the NP refused to co-operate with the British authorities, the DNP supported co-operation in order to achieve economic development that would ultimately lead to independence as a dominion.

The party also had a manifesto committing to social welfare.
