= Mabel Strickland =

Anglo-Maltese journalist, newspaper proprietor and politician (1899–1988)

The Honourable Mabel Strickland OBE
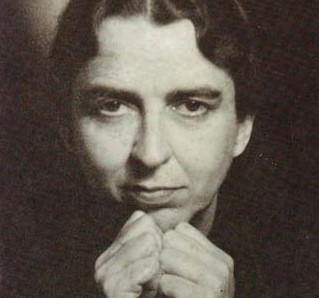
- Strickland in 1935
- Born: Mabel Edeline Strickland; 8 January 1899
- Died: 29 November 1988 (aged 89)
- Resting place: St. Paul's Cathedral, Mdina
- Occupations: Journalist, politician
- Known for: Co-founding the Times of Malta
- Political party: Progressive Constitutionalist
- Parents: Sir Gerald Strickland (father); Edeline Strickland (mother)

Mabel Edeline Strickland (8 January 1899 – 29 November 1988) was a Maltese journalist, newspaper proprietor and politician.

== Family and personal life ==
Strickland was the daughter of Sir Gerald Strickland, later the 4th Prime Minister of Malta, and Lady Edeline Sackville.

Her mother was the eldest daughter of Reginald Sackville, 7th Earl De La Warr of Knole, Kent.

Mabel never married, leaving the bulk of her estate to her sole heir Robert Hornyold-Strickland. Mabel set up the Strickland Foundation "for herself and her heirs in perpetuity" in 1979. However some of her key assets including the majority shareholding of Allied Newspapers Ltd together with her family home and all of her personal, legal and administrative papers were diverted by her executors away from Mabel's heir. This has resulted in two significant court cases filed against the Foundation and Allied Newspapers Ltd by her heir.

== Residences ==
Mabel Strickland lived the most of her life at Villa Parisio in Lija, Malta. Prior to this she lived in her family home of Villa Bologna, in Attard, Malta – home of her father Lord Strickland.

== Career ==
Strickland founded a newspaper group in Malta with her father and her stepmother, Lady Strickland, DBE (Margaret, daughter of Edward Hulton). In 1935 she became editor of The Times of Malta and "Il Berqa" before taking over as Managing Director of the Group on the death of her father in 1940. The paper never missed an issue throughout the Siege of Malta in World War Two, despite taking direct hits on several occasions.

She was elected to the Parliament for the Constitutional Party, which was co-founded by her father, in 1950 and served until 1953 as one of only three women MPs. She departed the Constitutional to form and lead the Progressive Constitutionalist Party in 1953 and was one of the principal political leaders of the 1950s, participating in the integration talks in 1956-57 as well as opposing independence in 1964. She was re-elected to the Maltese Parliament in 1962, and served until 1966. She always fought passionately for a free and independent press and to maintain Malta's ties with Britain and the Commonwealth.

On her retirement she established the Strickland Foundation in the name of her family.

== Suffragist ==
She is known for her work for women's suffrage on Malta. Malta was a British colony, but when women's suffrage was finally introduced in Great Britain in 1918, this had not been included in the 1921 Constitution on Malta, when Malta was given its own parliament, although the Labour Party did support the reform. In 1931, Mabel Strickland, as assistant secretary of Constitution Party, delivered a petition signed by 428 to the Royal Commission on Maltese Affairs requesting women's suffrage without success.

She supported the efforts of the Women of Malta Association to introduce women's suffrage in the 1940s, and wrote:

"The war record of the women of Malta corresponds with that which won franchise for the women in the UK after the war of 1914-1918 … Malta's men and women, have to face the post-war period and the women have invaded the labour market … [m]any are asking, ‘When the evil of war is over, must the Maltese woman go back into a life of looker-on, a burden to the male members of the family, instead of enjoying the right of planning life and living it?’ … Malta has reached a transition stage. The clock cannot go back".

Women's suffrage was finally introduced in 1947.

== Death ==
Mabel Strickland died on 29 November 1988, and is buried in the Strickland family crypt in St. Paul's Cathedral, Mdina.

Having never married or had children of her own, Mabel Strickland's chosen sole heir was her great-nephew Robert Hornyold-Strickland. However upon Strickland's death after Robert Hornyold-Strickland was out of Malta, Mabel, as an old lady, was persuaded to change her will by the lawyer who was to become one of her two Executors. Despite the revised will, her great nephew always remained her sole heir. But a result of the revised and very unclear will, her estate has become the subject of a legal conflict between Hornyold-Strickland and the Strickland Foundation. Mabel Strickland set up this foundation "for herself and her heirs in perpetuity".

As soon as Robert Hornyold-Strickland took legal action against the executors in 2010, having tried to find an amicable settlement for decades, the aging Executors saw fit to transfer the majority shareholding in Allied Newspapers Ltd (Times of Malta) that had been held in their own names (as executors of the estate), directly to The Strickland Foundation in a highly irregular manner. This is because The Strickland Foundation is registered as a legal person, being as it is a "body corporate", and is, anyway ineligible to be a shareholder both under Maltese Company Law and also under the terms of Allied Newspapers Ltd own Articles of Associate which disallows any "body corporate" from being a shareholder. This irregular transfer, where no instrument of transfer has ever been produced by the executors, is now also the issue of another court case taken out by Robert Hornyold-Strickland and is still in the courts.

== See also ==
- Villa Parisio
- Women of Malta Association
