= Labour Party (Malta) =

Political party in Malta

Labour Party Partit Laburista
- Abbreviation: PL
- Leader: Robert Abela
- President: Alex Sciberras
- Governing body: National Executive
- Spokesperson: Norma Saliba
- Deputy leader for parliamentary affairs: Ian Borg
- Deputy leader for party affairs: Alex Agius Saliba
- Founder: William Savona
- Founded: 15 March 1921; 105 years ago
- Headquarters: Ċentru Nazzjonali Laburista, 77 Triq Mile End, il-Ħamrun
- Newspaper: Kullħadd
- Think tank: Fondazzjoni IDEAT
- Student wing: PULSE (de-facto)
- Youth wing: Labour Youths
- Women's wing: Labour Women
- Pioneer organization: Brigata Laburista (1959-2008)
- Media arm: One Productions
- Elderly wing: Labour Veterans
- Membership (2020): 17,500
- Ideology: Social democracy; Populism; Historical: Democratic socialism; Mintoffianism
- Political position: Centre-left; Historical: Left-wing
- National affiliation: Malta Labour Movement (1978–1992)
- Regional affiliation: PSOM (1976–unknown dissolution date)
- European affiliation: Party of European Socialists
- European Parliament group: Progressive Alliance of Socialists and Democrats
- Continental affiliation: Socialists, Democrats and Greens Group
- International affiliation: Socialist International; Historical: AAPSO
- Colours: Red
- Slogan: "Labor Omnia Vincit" ("Labour conquers all")
- Anthem: "L-Innu tal-Partit Laburista" ("Anthem of the Labour Party")
- Parliament of Malta: 42 / 67
- European Parliament: 3 / 6
- Mayors of localities: 39 / 68
- Local council seats: 252 / 462

Election symbol
- Torch

Party flag

Website
- partitlaburista.org

The Labour Party (Maltese: Partit Laburista, PL), formerly known as the Malta Labour Party (Maltese: Partit tal-Ħaddiema, MLP), is the governing political party in Malta, and one of the two major parties alongside the Nationalist Party. It sits on the centre-left of the political spectrum.

The party was founded in 1921 as the Camera del Lavoro ("Chamber of Labour") by a small group of trade unionists. Ideologically, the party was orientated towards democratic socialism and other left-wing stances until the early 1990s, when it followed the lead of like-minded Western social democratic parties like Britain's New Labour. The party still identifies as democratic socialist in their party programme. Under the leadership of Joseph Muscat, the party shifted more towards the centre, adopting Third Way policies. A formerly Eurosceptic party, it claims to hold pro-European stances and is a member of the Party of European Socialists, and the Socialist International.

== Party structure ==
The party structures are the General Conference, the National Executive, the Leader, and the Deputy Leaders, the Party Congress, the Party Administration, the Parliamentary Group, the Councillors' Section, the District and the Regional Administrations, the Local Committees, and the Branches.

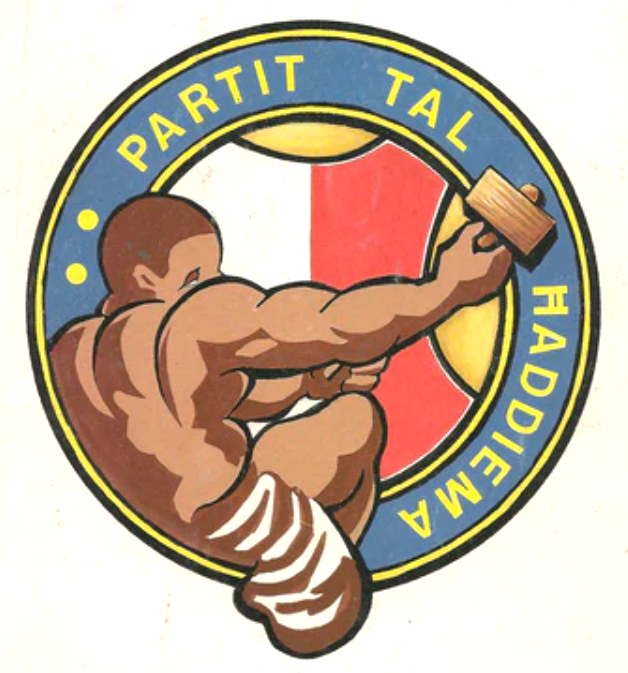
The original Labour emblem in use until 1933

The General Conference is largely made up of delegates from the Party's other constituent structures and is the Party's highest organ. The National Executive brings together the Party Administration as well as elected representatives of other constituent structures and co-ordinators. The Party Congress is made up of all members of the Party and elects the Leader and the two Deputy Leaders (one for Party, the other for Parliamentary affairs) and determines the Party's broad policy outlines. The Party Administration is made of the Party Leader, Deputy Leaders, and Party officials. The Parliamentary Group and the Councillors' Section bring together the Party's elected representatives in parliament and local councils. The Party is organised geographically in the local committees (smallest) and district and regional (largest) administrations. Finally, the branches of the party include the women's, youth, senior, and candidates' sections.

=== Media holdings ===
Although not formally part of the party's structures, the party owns a number of media and communication outlets, the largest being the television station ONE and radio service ONE Radio through its holding company ONE Productions. The party also owns the publishing house SKS (Sensiela Kotba Soċjalisti) and produces the weekly Sunday newspaper Kullħadd. The party formerly ran the travel agency Sunrise Travel and the MVNO RedTouch Fone.

== History ==
=== Foundation, first years, and first government (1921–1949) ===
The Labour Party was founded as the Chamber of Labour (Italian: Camera del Lavoro) in 1921 by one of the union branches affiliated with the Imperial Government Workers Union. Band clubs and other organisations were invited to send delegates to the Party's founding meeting on 15 March 1921.

Led by Colonel William Savona, the Party contested the general elections held in 1921 and 1924 under the new Constitution that gave the country a measure of self-government. The Labour-Constitutional alliance won the 1927 general elections, but Labour lost ground, gaining 13.9% of votes, three seats in the Legislative Assembly and no representation in the Senate. Strickland became prime minister. Labour leader Savona was not elected, and the leadership of the Labour parliamentary group was temporarily entrusted to Colonel Michael Dundon. The Presidency of the Party and leadership of the parliamentary group was taken up by Paul Boffa later that year. In 1930, it adopted a party anthem.

Labour gained nine seats out of ten in the elections held during November 1945, in which, contrarily to previous elections, all men over twenty-one years of age were entitled to vote. The Party's electoral programme, for the first time in Labour's history, did not make any reference to religion. Boffa's Government was supported by the General Workers' Union, and it carried out a number of reforms, including the abolition of the Senate, the abolition of plural votes, and the introduction of women's right to vote. However, Labour deputies resigned from their posts in July 1946 due to mass redundancies at the Dockyards. In the meantime, the 'MacMichael Constitution' had been introduced, granting self-government to the Maltese. Labour's participation in the subsequent October 1947 elections was once again supported by the General Workers' Union. The Party won 59.9% of the vote and twenty-four seats out of the possible forty within the Legislative Assembly. Paul Boffa became prime minister whilst Dom Mintoff became Deputy Prime Minister and Minister for Reconstruction. The Labour Government introduced Income Tax and Social Services for the first time in Malta.

=== Re-founding and return to government (1949–1958) ===
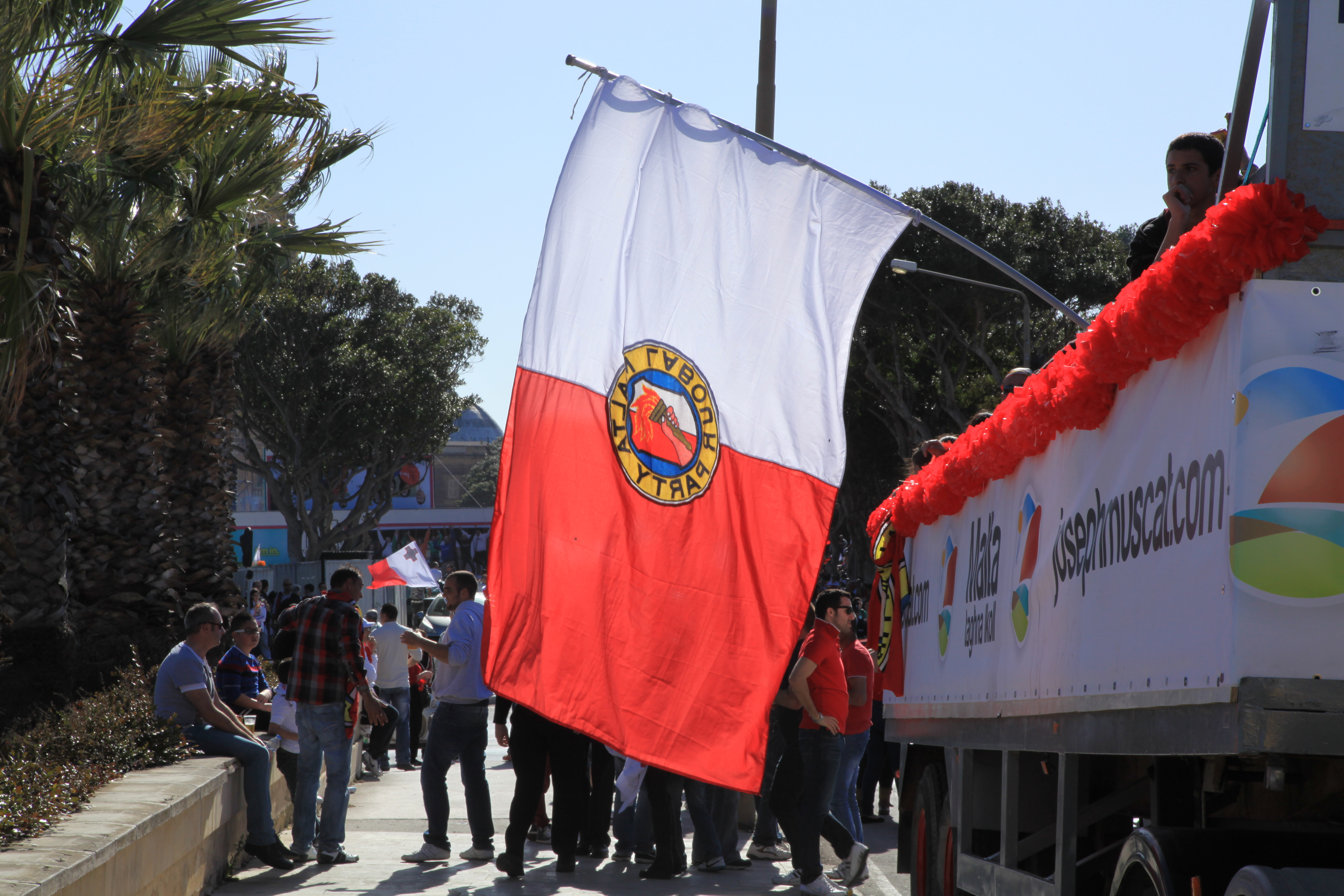
Emblem of the MLP adopted in 1949 on a flag. The emblem was changed in 2008 but it is still commonly seen at Labour meetings and events.

The Labour Party was re-founded in 1949 as a successor to the Labour Party founded in 1921. Paul Boffa, Leader of the Labour Party and prime minister since 1947, resigned and left the party because of serious disagreements with his Deputy Dom Mintoff which had led to a series of cabinet crises. Boffa formed the Malta Workers Party (MWP) while Mintoff re-organized the Labour Party as the Malta Labour Party. It has also adopted The Internationale as one of its anthems.

The Malta Labour Party contested its first elections for the Malta Legislative Assembly the following year. The old Labour vote was split equally between the MLP and the MWP, giving them eleven members each. This allowed the Nationalist Party (PN) to have a slight edge in the formation of a government, which it did in coalition with the MWP. The government did not last long. Two other elections were held in 1951 and 1953 (the last time a coalition governed in Malta) which both saw short-lived PN-MWP coalitions and the decline in the share of votes to the MWP with increasing support for the Labour Party.

The MWP eventually disintegrated and the MLP formed a government for the first time in 1955. This legislature was dominated by the issue of integration with the United Kingdom. The party, which started its life as an anti-colonial party with the slogan "Integration or self-determination" was now inclined towards the first part of the formula. A referendum was held in 1956 but given the number of abstentions and massive opposition by the Nationalist Party and the Catholic Church, the result was inconclusive. This, together with a number of dismissals at the naval dockyard led to Mintoff's resignation and his call for massive protests in April 1958.

=== Opposition (1958–1971) ===
The Governor re-established direct colonial government which lasted until 1962. In the meantime, the Malta Labour Party's connections with Third World Independentist and Socialist movements set it on a collision course with the Maltese Catholic Church, which the Party perceived as being pro-British and the cause of the failure of the Integration project. This led to the party leadership being interdicted from 1961 to 1964, when reading, advertising and distributing Party newspapers was deemed a mortal sin. In the 1962 elections, this led to the defeat of the Party at the polls as well as a split with the creation of the Christian Workers' Party. Peace with the Church would not be made until 1969 by which time the Christian Workers' Party had disintegrated.

The MLP participated in independence talks but disagreed with what was offered, causing them to not participate in the Independence celebrations when independence was actually achieved in 1964. The party made strong gains in the 1966 elections which, however, were not enough to see it in office.

An unimportant split occurred in 1969 when the Communist Party of Malta was founded. This split happened as a result of the truce between the Malta Labour Party and local Catholic authorities. The Communist Party has since only contested the 1987 elections.

=== Post-independence Mintoff governments (1971–1984) ===
Labour won the 1971 general election and immediately set out to re-negotiate the post-Independence military and financial agreements with the United Kingdom. The government also undertook socialist-style nationalization programmes, import substitution schemes, and the expansion of the public sector and the welfare state. Employment laws were revised with gender equality being introduced in salary pay. In the case of civil law, civil (non-religious) marriage was introduced and homosexuality and adultery were decriminalised. Through a package of constitutional reforms agreed to with the opposition party, Malta became a republic in 1974.

The Labour Party was confirmed in office in the 1976 elections. In 1981 the Party managed to hold on to a parliamentary majority, even though the opposition Nationalist Party managed an absolute majority of more than 4000 votes. A serious political crisis ensued when Nationalist MPs refused to accept the electoral result and also refused to take their seats in parliament for the first years of the legislature. Premier Dom Mintoff called this action "perverse" but it was not an uncommon one in any parliamentary democracy with disputed election results. He proposed to his parliamentary group that fresh elections be held, but most members of his Parliamentary group rejected his proposal. Mintoff, who had been considering vacating the party leadership position even before the elections, voluntarily resigned as prime minister and Party leader in 1984 (although he retained his parliamentary seat). A Party General Conference in that same year appointed Karmenu Mifsud Bonnici who acted uncontested as party leader.

=== Post-Mintoff era (1984–1992) ===
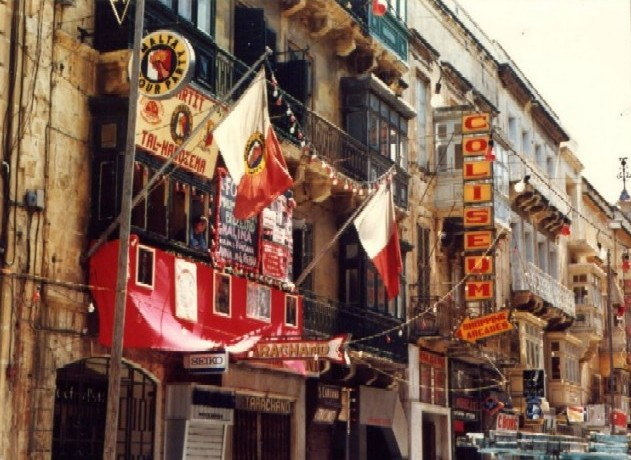
The club of the Malta Labour Party in Republic Street, Valletta in 1985.

The Mifsud Bonnici years were characterised by political tensions and violence. The deadlock was broken when constitutional amendments were made voted and made effective in January 1987 which guaranteed that the party with an absolute majority of votes would be given a majority of parliamentary seats in order to govern. This paved the way for the return of the Nationalist Party to government later that year.

The Labour Party performed very badly in the following election in 1992, losing by nearly 13,000 votes. Mifsud Bonnici resigned due to deteriorating health and on 26 March, Labour elected Alfred Sant as the new leader.

=== Sant leadership, modernisation, and challenges (1992–2008) ===
Sant who won the election for party leader, and then modernized the party, secured a victory at the polls in 1996. Under Sant's leadership the party made several changes. The party opened the new Labour Party Headquarters in Hamrun instead of the old Macina in Cottonera. The party also made giant steps in the media by being the first Maltese political party to own its radio and television stations.

Sant managed to win comfortably the 1996 elections held on 26 October by over 8,000 votes on the Nationalist Party. The 1987 constitutional amendments, which secured the necessary additional seats, had to be used for the second time, having been used for the same time in 1987. This same amendment had to be used a third time in 2008.

However, trouble was brewing. Mintoff, for reasons known to him alone (within the MLP), started creating problems in Parliament for the one-seat Labour parliamentary majority. In the summer of 1998, Labour lost a division vote on the proposed Cottonera waterfront project because of Mintoff's renegation on his parliamentary group. This was considered by Prime Minister Sant as a vote of no confidence in his government and informed the then-President of the Republic that he no longer held a parliamentary majority as a result. The President had on various occasions asked Prime Minister Alfred Sant to try to find a solution for the political crisis created, but when all attempts proved futile, he had no other option but to accept Sant and his government's resignation and a call for early elections, which were held on 5 September 1998. The Labour Party was defeated with a wide 13,000 vote margin.

Back in opposition, the party campaigned unsuccessfully against EU membership, and the 'NO' camp lost the referendum for the ascension of Malta in the European Union on 8 March (although Sant claimed victory) and was again defeated in the general election a month later on 14 April 2003, once more with a 12,000 vote margin. Sant resigned but stood again for party leader, where he was re-elected with more than 65% of the votes.

In June 2004 the party succeeded in obtaining a relative majority of votes in the elections held to elect the first five Maltese MEPs for the European Parliament. The party elected three of his candidates: Joseph Muscat (later replaced by Glenn Bedingfield), John Attard Montalto and Louis Grech.

In 2008 the Labour Party lost for the third consecutive time in the 2008 general elections, obtaining 48.79% share of the vote and losing the election to the Nationalist Party by just 1,580 votes or 0.5%. Following the loss of the election, Sant resigned as Labour Party leader on 10 March 2008.

=== Muscat leadership (2008–2020) ===
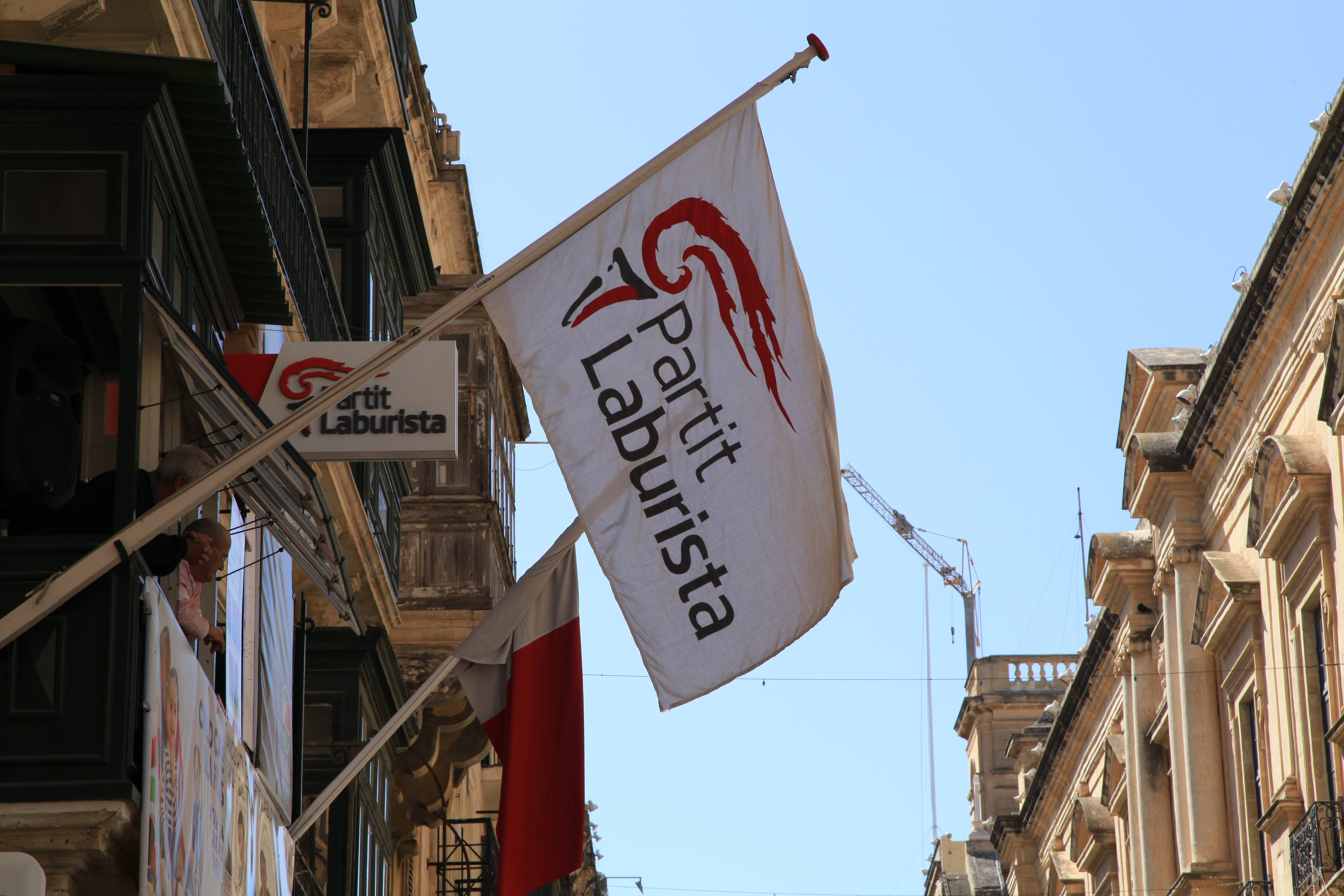
The new flag of the Labour Party.

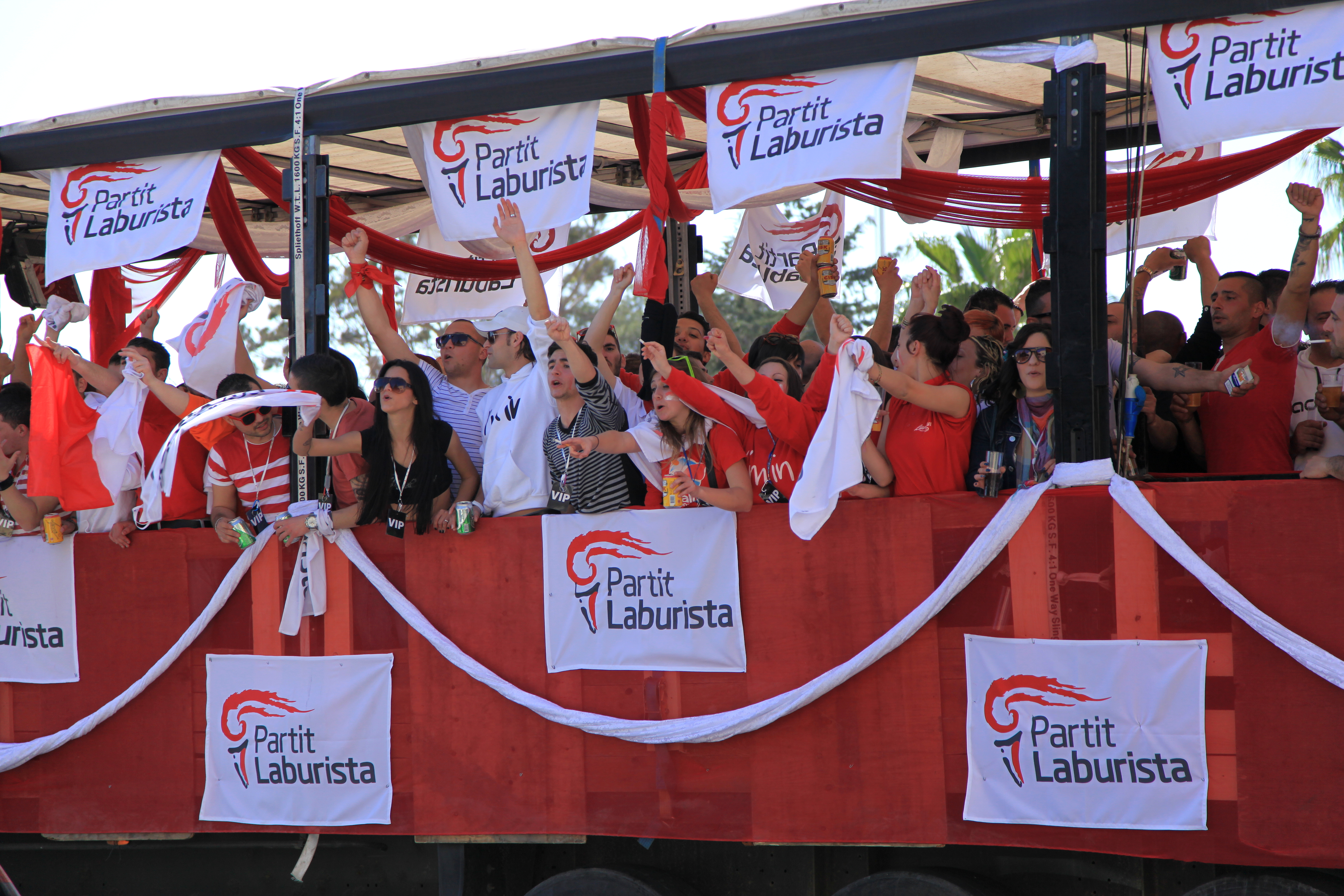
Labourites celebrate after the 2013 election.

The first round of the election of the new leader were held on 5 June 2008. Five members contested this election as candidates: George Abela (a former Deputy Leader), Evarist Bartolo (a frontbench MP and ex-Minister), Marie Louise Coleiro Preca (a frontbench MP and former Secretary-General of the Party), Michael Falzon (an MP and Deputy Leader of the Party) and Joseph Muscat (an MEP). In the first round neither candidate obtained 50%+1 the majority of the votes. So a run up election had to be held on 6 June between the top two candidates who obtained the most votes, George Abela and Joseph Muscat. Muscat was elected Labour Party leader, gathering 66.36% of the total votes. He was co-opted in Parliament and appointed Leader of the Opposition on 1 October.

During an Extraordinary General Conference, held in November 2008, it was decided that the party's official name would be Partit Laburista instead of its former English name, the Malta Labour Party. The previous emblem was changed, although the symbol of the torch was retained.

In June 2009, the party garnered 55 percent of the first preference votes in the election for the European Parliament, electing three MEPs who sit with the Progressive Alliance of Socialists and Democrats. This result led to Labour a fourth MEP when the Treaty of Lisbon came into effect and the number of seats allocated to Malta increased from five to six.

Muscat managed to win comfortably the 2013 elections held on 9 March by over 35,000 votes on the Nationalist Party. The Labour Party won a massive 55% of the votes.

In the 2014 MEP elections, the Labour Party retained a majority of 34,000 votes (53%), but lost its fourth seat to the Nationalist Party candidate Therese Comodini Cachia.

In 2015, the party was delisted from the Socialist International for not paying membership fees.

In 2017, Joseph Muscat was re-elected during the general election, with Labour appearing to win with a clear landslide victory for the second consecutive time, merely an hour after the vote counting commenced.

Under Muscat's leadership Malta's national deficit was eliminated, unemployment decreased to historic lows, and an unprecedented period of economic growth occurred. However, he was criticised by figures on both sides of the political spectrum, accused of political opportunism, broken promises on meritocracy and the environment, as well as corruption allegations. On 1 December 2019, Muscat announced his resignation, to take effect after 12 January 2020, due to the 2019 Maltese protests caused by the murder of anti-corruption journalist and government critic Daphne Caruana Galizia. Muscat was accused of impeding the investigation. Robert Abela was elected to replace him, promising continuity with previous policies pursued by the party.

=== Abela leadership (2020–present) ===
As the party held a parliamentary majority at the time of Muscat's resignation, Robert Abela would become prime minister immediately after, on 13 January 2020. He was recognized as the "continuity" candidate instead of Chris Fearne, emphasizing stability, unity and normality, as opposed to the bolder changes advocated by Fearne.

Abela is considered to be aligned to traditional Labour's values, such as social housing and free medicine for the elderly.

In March 2020, Malta registered its first COVID-19 case. Abela was at first reluctant to close the Malta International Airport, retail outlets and the schools, but felt compelled to do so a few days later as public pressure mounted.

In April 2020, Prime Minister Abela called for 'national unity' on Television Malta, the country's national broadcasting television. This has been criticized for being partisan.

In November 2020, Abela stated "that the party will continue to reinvent itself with the introduction of more young people and women at the centre of its decision-making process."

On 18 February 2021, Abela announced plans to introduce a law that would end police arrests for those possessing a small amount of cannabis and plants for personal use. This bill was passed in December 2021, and Malta became the first country in the European Union to legalise cannabis.

Abela's leadership was criticised with the number of co-options that had taken place, being deemed as undemocratic.

In the 2022 general election, the Labour Party retained its majority in parliament, winning a third consecutive election for the first time since 1981 with 55.11% of the popular vote, the largest share by any party since 1955, and marginally surpassing the 55.04% it scored in 2017. Voter turnout was 85.6%. Labour's win was attributed to how it maintained Maltese economic prosperity through the COVID-19 pandemic, including keeping unemployment and energy costs low contrary to global trends, and how it tackled corruption and money laundering through rule-of-law reforms.

== Election results ==
=== House of Representatives ===
Election	Leader	Votes	%	Seats	+/−	Rank	Status
1921	William Savona	4,742	23.2	7 / 32	New	3rd	Opposition
1924	William Savona	4,632	19.2	7 / 32	0	3rd	Opposition
1927	William Savona	5,011	14.5	3 / 32	▼4	3rd	Coalition
1932	Paul Boffa	4,138	8.6	1 / 32	▼2	3rd	Opposition
1939	Paul Boffa	3,100	8.8	1 / 10	0	3rd	Opposition
1945	Paul Boffa	19,071	76.2	9 / 10	▲8	1st	Majority
1947	Paul Boffa	63,145	59.9	24 / 40	▲15	1st	Majority
1950	Dom Mintoff	30,332	28.6	11 / 40	▼13	2nd	Opposition
1951	Dom Mintoff	40,208	35.7	14 / 40	▲3	2nd	Opposition
1953	Dom Mintoff	52,771	44.6	19 / 40	▲5	1st	Opposition
1955	Dom Mintoff	68,447	56.7	23 / 40	▲4	1st	Majority
1962	Dom Mintoff	50,974	33.8	16 / 50	▼7	2nd	Opposition
1966	Dom Mintoff	61,774	43.1	22 / 50	▲6	2nd	Opposition
1971	Dom Mintoff	85,448	50.8	28 / 55	▲6	1st	Majority
1976	Dom Mintoff	105,854	51.5	34 / 65	▲6	1st	Majority
1981	Dom Mintoff	109,990	49.1	34 / 65	0	1st	Majority
1987	Karmenu Mifsud Bonnici	114,936	48.9	34 / 69	0	2nd	Opposition
1992	Karmenu Mifsud Bonnici	114,911	46.5	31 / 65	▼3	2nd	Opposition
1996	Alfred Sant	132,497	50.7	35 / 69	▲4	1st	Majority
1998	Alfred Sant	124,220	47.0	30 / 65	▼5	2nd	Opposition
2003	Alfred Sant	134,092	47.5	30 / 65	0	2nd	Opposition
2008	Alfred Sant	141,888	48.8	34 / 69	▲4	2nd	Opposition
2013	Joseph Muscat	167,533	54.8	39 / 69	▲5	1st	Majority
2017	Joseph Muscat	170,976	55.0	37 / 67	▼2	1st	Majority
2022	Robert Abela	162,707	55.1	44 / 79	▲7	1st	Majority
2026	Robert Abela	158,444	51.77	42 / 79	▼2	1st	Majority

=== European Parliament ===
Election	Leader	Votes	%	Seats	+/−	Rank	EP Group
2004	Alfred Sant	118,983	48.4	3 / 5	New	1st	PES
2009	Joseph Muscat	135,917	54.8	4 / 6	▲1	1st	S&D
2014	Joseph Muscat	134,462	53.3	3 / 6	▼1	1st	S&D
2019	Joseph Muscat	141,267	54.3	4 / 6	▲1	1st	S&D
2024	Robert Abela	117,805	45.3	3 / 6	▼1	1st	S&D

== Party leadership ==
=== Leaders of the Labour Party ===
The post of Leader of the Labour Party was created in 1928. Before this (1921–28) the post was known as President of the Camera del Lavoro (Labour Party).

	Name	Entered office	Left office	Length of Leadership	Date of birth and death
1	William Savona	30 August 1925	16 August 1927	1 year, 11 months, 17 days	7 January 1865 – 18 January 1937
2	Michael Dundon ^{†}	16 August 1927	29 November 1928	1 year, 3 months, 13 days	10 November 1854 – 5 April 1936
3	Paul Boffa	29 November 1928	12 October 1949	20 years, 10 months, 13 days	30 June 1890 – 6 July 1962
4	Dom Mintoff	16 October 1949	22 December 1984	35 years, 2 months, 6 days	6 August 1916 – 20 August 2012
5	Karmenu Mifsud Bonnici	22 December 1984	26 March 1992	7 years, 3 months, 4 days	17 July 1933 – 5 November 2022
6	Alfred Sant	26 March 1992	10 March 2008	15 years, 11 months, 15 days	28 February 1948 – present
7	Charles Mangion ^{†}	10 March 2008	6 June 2008	2 months, 27 days	14 November 1952 – present
8	Joseph Muscat	6 June 2008	12 January 2020	11 years, 7 months and 6 days	22 January 1974 – present
9	Robert Abela	12 January 2020	Present	6 years, 10 months and 4 days	7 December 1977 – present

^{†}Although technically leader of the Labour Party, they only assumed this role because of the resignation of the incumbent leader and were not elected to the post.

=== Deputy leaders of the Labour Party in the Maltese House of Representatives since 1920 ===
- P. Bugelli 1920–1925
- Michael Dundon 1925–1929
- Paul Boffa 1929–1947
- Dom Mintoff 1947–1949
- Joseph Flores 1949–1955
- Ġużè Ellul Mercer 1955–1961
- Anton Buttigieg 1961–1976
- Agatha Barbara 1976–1981
- Wistin Abela 1981–1982
- Karmenu Mifsud Bonnici 1982–1984
- Guze Cassar 1984–1987
- Joseph Brincat 1987–1992
- George Vella 1992–2003
- Charles Mangion 2003–2008
- Angelo Farrugia 2008–2012
- Louis Grech 2012–2017
- Chris Fearne 2017–2024
- Ian Borg 2024–Present

=== Deputy leaders of the Labour Party Affairs since 1976 ===
- Joseph Brincat 1976–1980
- Karmenu Mifsud Bonnici 1980–1983
- Guze Cassar 1983-1987
- Joe Debono Grech 1987–1992
- George Abela 1992–1998
- Joseph Brincat 1998–2003
- Michael Falzon 2003–2008
- Toni Abela 2008–2016
- Konrad Mizzi 2016
- Chris Cardona 2016–2020
- Daniel Jose Micallef 2020–2024
- Alex Agius Saliba 2024–Present

== See also ==
- Sette Giugno
- Interdict
- Parliament of Malta
- European Parliament
- Prime Minister of Malta
