= Social vulnerability =

Dimension of vulnerability to multiple stressors

In its broadest sense, social vulnerability is one dimension of vulnerability to multiple stressors and shocks, including abuse, social exclusion and natural hazards. Social vulnerability refers to the inability of people, organizations, and societies to withstand adverse impacts from multiple stressors to which they are exposed. These impacts are due in part to characteristics inherent in social interactions, institutions, and systems of cultural values.

Social vulnerability is an interdisciplinary topic that connects social, health, and environmental fields of study. As it captures the susceptibility of a system or an individual to external stressors such as pandemics or natural disasters, social vulnerability is a focus of many studies in the risk management literature.

== Background ==
The structural nature, as opposed to the individual level, is central to social vulnerability. Social and political systemic inequalities influence or shape the susceptibility of various groups to harm as well as govern their ability to respond. Both the sensitivity and resilience of a group to prepare, cope, and recover from hazards define their social vulnerability.

Although considerable research attention has examined components of biophysical vulnerability and the vulnerability of the built environment, we once knew the least about the social aspects of vulnerability. Socially created vulnerabilities were largely ignored, mainly due to the difficulty in quantifying them.

Researching social vulnerability is interdisciplinary, combining theories from sociology, health, political economy, and geography. Just like the different disciplines use different approaches and scopes of analyses (qualitative or quantitative; different objects/groups of analysis; different types of hazards/stressors), so too did the early versions of attempting to quantify social vulnerability.

Since the 1960s, there have been methods for collecting and quantifying data to depict a community's social conditions and quality of life. Within the geography discipline, spatially quantifying social problems and social well-being has been practiced since the 1970s. At the same time, Phil O'Keefe, Ken Westgate, and Ben Wisner introduced the concept of vulnerability within the discourse on natural hazards and disasters, emphasizing the role of socio-economic conditions as causes of disasters. Susan Cutter's 2003 social vulnerability index was a turning point in studying social vulnerability. The index and hazard of place model was built upon the decades-before groundwork and synthesized the interdisciplinary challenges and goals of measuring vulnerability. As of March 2024, Cutter's original paper has been cited over 7,500 times, suggesting its influence across fields and potential replication of its methodology in different contexts.

It is important to consider, however, that analyses focusing on stress-to-vulnerability are insufficient for understanding the impacts on and responses of affected groups. These issues are often underlined in attempts to model the concept (see Models of Social Vulnerability).

== Definitions and Types ==
"Vulnerability" derives from the Latin word vulnerare (to wound) and describes the potential to be harmed physically and/or psychologically. Vulnerability is often understood as the counterpart of resilience, and is increasingly studied in linked social-ecological systems. The Yogyakarta Principles, one of the international human rights instruments, uses the term "vulnerability" to refer to such potential for abuse or social exclusion.

The concept of social vulnerability emerged most recently within the discourse on natural hazards and disasters. To date, no one definition has been agreed upon. Similarly, multiple theories of social vulnerability exist. Most work conducted so far focuses on empirical observation and conceptual models. Thus, current social vulnerability research is a middle-range theory and represents an attempt to understand the social conditions that transform a natural hazard (e.g., floods, earthquakes, mass movements) into a social disaster. The concept emphasizes two central themes:

1. Both the causes and the phenomenon of disasters are defined by social processes and structures. Thus, it is not only a geo- or biophysical hazard, but rather the social context that needs to be considered to understand "natural" disasters.
2. Although different groups of a society may share a similar exposure to a natural hazard, the hazard has varying consequences for these groups, since they have diverging capacities and abilities to handle the impact of a hazard.

=== Types ===
==== Vulnerability to natural hazards, or climate vulnerability ====
Natural hazards reveal the level of social vulnerability of individuals and communities. The way people or communities can "respond to, cope with, recover from, and adapt to hazards" can indicate the degree of vulnerability. In the wake of a disaster event, factors like economic, demographic, and housing conditions can determine vulnerability, adaptive capacity, and preparedness. Flooding, for example, will affect a homeowner whose basement has flooded differently from a renter whose basement apartment has also flooded.

==== Collective vulnerability, or community vulnerability ====
Collective vulnerability is a state in which the integrity and social fabric of a community is or was threatened through traumatic events or repeated collective violence. In addition, according to the collective vulnerability hypothesis, shared experience of vulnerability and the loss of shared normative references can lead to collective reactions aimed to reestablish the lost norms and trigger forms of collective resilience.

Social psychologists have developed this theory to study the support for human rights. It is rooted in the consideration that devastating collective events are sometimes followed by claims for measures that may prevent a similar event from happening again. For instance, the Universal Declaration of Human Rights was a direct consequence of the horrors of World War II. Psychological research by Willem Doise and colleagues shows indeed that after people have experienced a collective injustice, they are more likely to support the reinforcement of human rights. Populations who collectively endured systematic human rights violations are more critical of national authorities and less tolerant of rights violations. Some analyses performed by Dario Spini, Guy Elcheroth and Rachel Fasel on the Red Cross' "People on War" survey shows that when individuals have direct experience with the armed conflict are less keen to support humanitarian norms. However, in countries where most social groups in conflict experience similar levels of victimization, people express a greater need to reestablish protective social norms, such as human rights, regardless of the conflict's magnitude.

== Models ==
Risk-Hazard (RH) model, showing the impact of a hazard as a function of exposure and sensitivity. The chain sequence begins with the hazard, and the concept of vulnerability is noted implicitly as represented by white arrows.

=== Risk-Hazard (RH) Model ===
Initial RH models sought to understand the impact of a hazard as a function of exposure to the hazardous event and the sensitivity of the entity exposed. Applications of this model in environmental and climate impact assessments generally emphasised exposure and sensitivity to perturbations and stressors and worked from the hazard to the impacts. However, several inadequacies became apparent. Primarily, it does not address how the systems in question amplify or attenuate the hazard's impacts. Neither does the model address the distinction among exposed subsystems and components that lead to significant variations in the consequences of the hazards, or the role of political economy in shaping differential exposure and consequences. This led to the development of the PAR model.

=== Pressure and Release (PAR) Model ===
Pressure and Release (PAR) model after Blaikie et al. (1994) showing the progression of vulnerability. The diagram shows a disaster as the intersection between socio-economic pressures on the left and physical exposures (natural hazards) on the right.

The PAR model understands a disaster as the intersection between socio-economic pressure and physical exposure. Risk is explicitly defined as a function of the perturbation, stressor, or stress and the vulnerability of the exposed unit. In this way, it directs attention to the conditions that make exposure unsafe, leading to vulnerability and to the causes creating these conditions. Used primarily to address social groups facing disasters, the model emphasises distinctions in vulnerability across different exposure units, such as social class and ethnicity. The model distinguishes between three components on the social side: root causes, dynamic pressures, and unsafe conditions, and one component on the natural side, the natural hazards themselves. Principal root causes include "economic, demographic and political processes" that affect the allocation and distribution of resources among different groups of people. Dynamic Pressures translate economic and political processes in local circumstances (e.g., migration patterns). Unsafe conditions are the specific forms in which vulnerability is expressed in time and space, such as those induced by the physical environment, local economy, or social relations.
Although explicitly highlighting vulnerability, the PAR model appears insufficiently comprehensive for the broader concerns of sustainability science. Primarily, it does not address the coupled human environment system in the sense of considering the vulnerability of biophysical subsystems, and it provides little detail on the structure of the hazard's causal sequence. The model also tends to underplay feedback beyond the system of analysis that the integrative RH models included.

==== Hazards of Place Model ====
Susan Cutter's hazards of place (HOP) model conceptualizes how both physical and social systems shape susceptibility to harm. Physical characteristics of a landscape can determine the level of exposure to hazards (i.e., elevation, proximity) while social vulnerability depends upon several social determinants of well-being (i.e., socio-economic status, governance). The HOP model allows for a spatial interaction ('place-based') between the biophysical and the social dimensions of vulnerability that may vary over space and time. The HOP demonstrates the equal importance of biophysical and social environments in determining the overall vulnerability of a particular area or group.

== Indexes ==
One way to estimate social vulnerability is to use a vulnerability index that aggregates social factors into a single measurement. Social vulnerability indices are widely used in disaster planning, environmental science, and health sciences. The use of social vulnerability indexes are frequently used in research studies to predict outcomes of illness, like COVID-19 infection, or mortality from disasters or environmental circumstances. An index allows for a continuous estimation of social vulnerability that can capture more than a single explanatory variable. The challenge and discrepancies between different indexes rest with the methodology of how the aggregated variables are chosen. Some researchers use more qualitative methods, such as theory-based approaches or community consultations. In contrast, others use more quantitative statistical methods, such as factor analysis or principal component analysis, drawing on censuses or similar national surveys.

In 2003, Susan Cutter created the Social Vulnerability Index (SoVI) using both qualitative and quantitative methods - firstly, by outlining the many potential variables that could contribute to social vulnerability supported by a literature review, and secondly, by condensing the list of over 250 variables into 42 variables that were used in a factor analysis. After further statistical testing, Cutter and her colleagues found 11 variables that could explain over 75% of the variance of social vulnerability to environmental hazards across U.S. counties.

Since the SoVI was created, many other researchers have used it or developed their own indices, adapting it to local environments and data availability. For example, in Canada, researchers at the University of Waterloo have created a SoVI for the Canadian context, including ethnicity (language, immigration, and Indigenous categories), visible minorities, and specific built-environment data, using sources unique to Canada.

The results of social vulnerability indices can be mapped using GIS to visualize who may be most vulnerable within study areas. Mapping social vulnerability visually identifies at-risk areas which can help inform members of the public, policymakers, and elected officials for better management (preparation, support, and recovery) of hazards.

== Integration into risk planning and adaptation ==
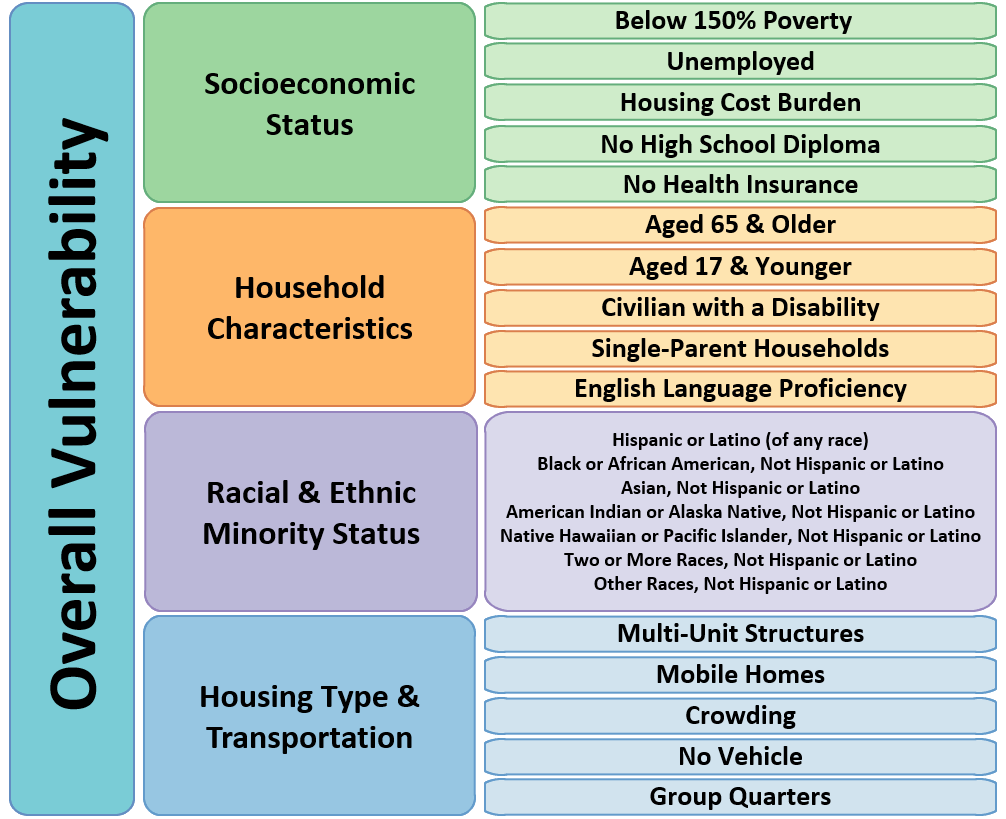
CDC/ATSDR Social Vulnerability Index variables grouped into four themes

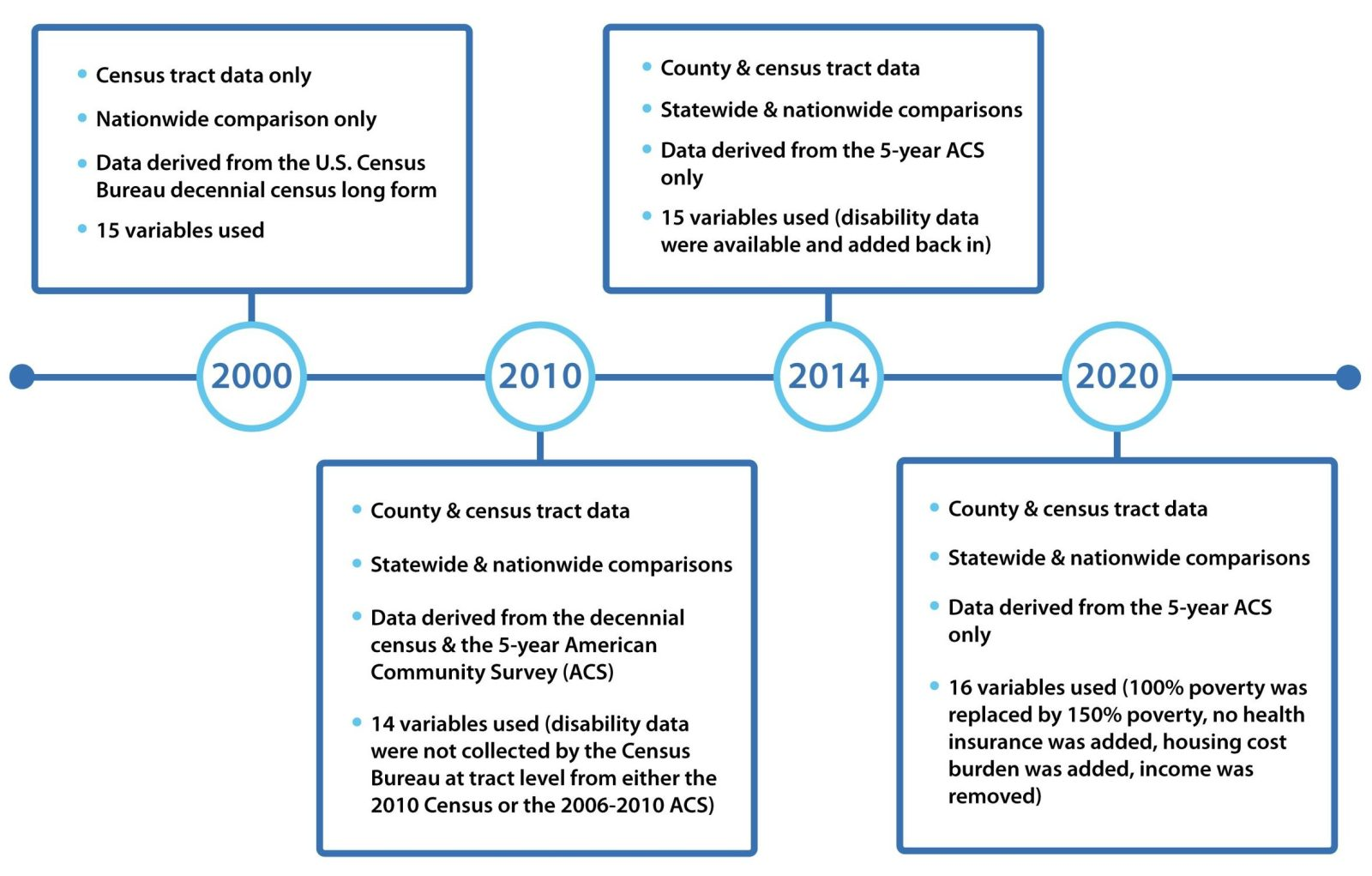
Timeline shows the years CDC/ATSDR Social Vulnerability Index changed its database – 2000, 2010, 2014, and 2020.

Social vulnerability is increasingly being integrated into disaster preparedness by government agencies and other organizations. This is being done in relation to climate and health vulnerabilities, disaster planning, and adaptation.

During the COVID-19 pandemic, the British Red Cross created a COVID-19 Vulnerability Index that combines health, demographic, and social vulnerability data with data on digital exclusion and health inequalities. The index was then mapped to represent vulnerable areas across the UK spatially.

In the United States, the Centre for Disease Control and Prevention (CDC) and the Agency for Toxic Substances and Disease Registry (ATSDR) have developed a place-based social vulnerability index (SVI) alongside an interactive mapping application. Public health officials use the index to identify where there is need for emergency shelters and to determine how many supplies are needed to distribute. State and local health departments, in addition to non-profits, use the index to promote health initiatives. In 2023, FEMA integrated the CDC/ATSDR's social vulnerability index into their National Risk Index - a mapping tool representing the risk associated with 18 natural hazards. This integration informs emergency planners to best distribute numbers of emergency personnel to at-risk areas, as well as plan evacuation routes.

In southern California, where wildfires have been increasing in frequency and destruction, the American Red Cross has used social vulnerability mapping in their campaign "Prepare SoCal" to highlight communities at-risk and point to where may be strategic to invest in preparedness education, tools, and resources for greater resilience.

The European Environment Agency has developed its own social vulnerability index tool that combines social, economic, and environmental indicators and associated data to highlight vulnerability to climate change. It can be used in conjunction with geographic layers that include flood risk and thermal heat data, to draw connections between social vulnerability and climate vulnerability explicitly. This tool has been used in cities and counties across Europe, including cities in Ireland and Spain, in addition to projects in Athens and Milan. The use of the index allows cities to plan future adaptation measures, understand how climate impacts may affect their neighbourhoods differently, and raise awareness among their citizens.

In Australia, the University of Melbourne's School of Population and Global Health has created a country-wide social vulnerability index to assess how social factors affect human health vulnerability to climate change. Their index uses over 70 indicators, many relating directly to climate change and extreme weather. The index is publicly available and was designed for communities, emergency response planners, and public health officials to better prepare for and recover from climate and weather disasters across Australia.

== Criticism ==
Some authors criticise the conceptualisation of social vulnerability for overemphasising the social, political, and economic processes and structures that lead to vulnerable conditions. Inherent in such a view is the tendency to understand people as passive victims and to neglect the subjective and intersubjective interpretation and perception of disastrous events. The author, Greg Bankoff, criticises the very basis of the concept, since, in his view, it is shaped by a knowledge system developed within the academic environment of Western countries and therefore inevitably represents the values and principles of that culture. According to Bankoff, the ultimate aim underlying this concept is to depict large parts of the world as dangerous and hostile to provide further justification for interference and intervention.

There are also criticisms surrounding the use of indices to measure social vulnerability. Difficulties of standardization, weighting, and aggregation of indicators can affect the quality of an index's results. Especially when indexes are used in large scale analyses - to evaluate multiple different countries and/or are using multiple data sources - how representative the results are can be questionable. If an index's results are too broad and subsequently used to guide policy, it can lead to maladaptation. Some argue that vulnerability is context-dependent, and cannot be categorized and captured fully in indexes, favouring instead smaller-scale empirical investigation.

== See also ==
- Disadvantaged
- Minority group
- Vulnerability index
- Vulnerability assessment
