= Volcanic hazard =

Probability of a volcanic eruption or related geophysical event

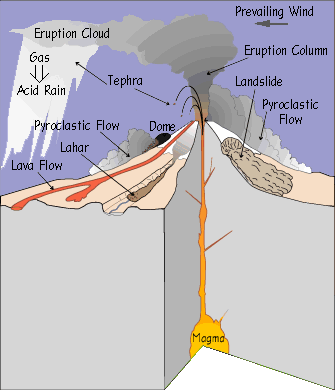
A schematic diagram shows some of the many ways volcanoes can cause problems for those nearby.

A volcanic hazard is the probability a volcanic eruption or related geophysical event will occur in a given geographic area and within a specified window of time. The risk that can be associated with a volcanic hazard depends on the proximity and vulnerability of an asset or a population of people near to where a volcanic event might occur.

== Lava flows ==
Different forms of effusive lava can provide different hazards. Pahoehoe lava is smooth and ropy while Aa lava is blocky and hard. Lava flows normally follow the topography, sinking into depressions and valleys and flowing down the volcano. Lava flows will bury roads, farmlands and other forms of personal property. This lava could destroy homes, cars, and lives standing in the way. Lava flows are dangerous, however, they are slow moving and this gives people time to respond and evacuate out of immediate areas. People can mitigate this hazard by not moving to valleys or depressed areas around a volcano.

== Pyroclastic materials (tephra) and flow ==
Tephra is a generalized word for the various bits of debris launched out of a volcano during an eruption, regardless of their size. Pyroclastic materials are generally categorized according to size: dust measures at <1/8 mm, ash is 1/8–2 mm, cinders are 2–64 mm, and bombs and blocks are both >64 mm. Different hazards are associated with the different kinds of pyroclastic materials. Dust and ash could coat cars and homes, rendering a car unable to drive with dust accumulation in the engine. They could also layer on homes and add weight to roofs causing a house to collapse. Also, ash and dust inhaled could cause long-term respiratory issues in people inhaling the particles. Cinders are flaming pieces of ejected volcanic material which could set fire to homes and wooded areas. Bombs and blocks run the risk of hitting various objects and people within range of the volcano. Projectiles can be thrown thousands of feet in the air and can be found several miles away from the initial eruption point.

A pyroclastic flow is a fast-moving (up to 700 km/h) extremely hot (~1000 °C) mass of air and tephra that charges down the sides of a volcano during an explosive eruption.

=== Air travel hazards ===
Ash thrown into the air by eruptions can present a hazard to aircraft, especially jet aircraft where the particles can be melted by the high operating temperature; the melted particles then adhere to the turbine blades and alter their shape, disrupting the operation of the turbine. Dangerous encounters in 1982 after the eruption of Galunggung in Indonesia, and 1989 after the eruption of Mount Redoubt in Alaska raised awareness of this phenomenon. Nine Volcanic Ash Advisory Centers were established by the International Civil Aviation Organization to monitor ash clouds and advise pilots accordingly. The 2010 eruptions of Eyjafjallajökull caused major disruptions to air travel in Europe.

== Mudflows, floods, debris flows and avalanches ==
When pyroclastic materials mix with water from a nearby stream or river, they can turn the watercourse into a fast moving mudflows. These are called lahars; when the lahar contains large material such as blocks of rock and trees, it is a volcanic debris flow. Lahars can form directly from a pyroclastic material flow flowing into a river, or could possibly form after the main eruption. The latter are referred to as secondary lahars and form when rain wets the ash and debris already on a landscape and stick together, rolling along the topography. It's estimated it can only take 30% water to initiate ash into a lahar. The thicker and/or more fast-moving a lahar, the more potential to destroy things in its path, thus making it more dangerous than a slower and/or more diluted lahar. Lahars and mudflows can damage buildings, wildlife and cars and can prove difficult to escape once caught in them. The lahars can coat objects, wash objects away and can knock objects down by their force. Lahars, debris flows and mudflows that travel into a river or stream run the potential for crowding the waterway, forcing the water to flow outward and causing a flood. The volcanic matter could also pollute the water, making it unsafe to drink.

The debris ejected from the volcano adds to the sides of the slope with each eruption, making the sides steeper each time. Eventually the slope gets so steep it fails and an avalanche ensues. These avalanches carry material and debris for very long distances at very short intervals. This makes a warning system nearly impossible because the slope failure could occur at any time. The avalanche will destroy anything in its path including personal property, houses, buildings, vehicles and possibly even wildlife. If the impact of the materials in the avalanche doesn't destroy the person or object at first contact, damage could result from the weight of prolonged material on the objects.

== Volcanic gases ==
Large, explosive volcanic eruptions inject water vapor (H_{2}O), carbon dioxide (CO_{2}), sulfur dioxide (SO_{2}), hydrogen chloride (HCl), hydrogen fluoride (HF) and ash (pulverized rock and pumice) into the stratosphere to heights of 16–32 kilometres (9.9–19.9 mi) above the Earth's surface. The most significant impacts from these injections come from the conversion of sulfur dioxide to sulfuric acid (H_{2}SO_{4}), which condenses rapidly in the stratosphere to form fine sulfate aerosols. The SO_{2} emissions alone of two different eruptions are sufficient to compare their potential climatic impact. The aerosols increase the Earth's albedo—its reflection of radiation from the Sun back into space—and thus cool the Earth's lower atmosphere or troposphere; however, they also absorb heat radiated up from the Earth, thereby warming the stratosphere. Several eruptions during the past century have caused a decline in the average temperature at the Earth's surface of up to half a degree (Fahrenheit scale) for periods of one to three years; sulfur dioxide from the eruption of Huaynaputina probably caused the Russian famine of 1601–1603.

=== Acid rain ===
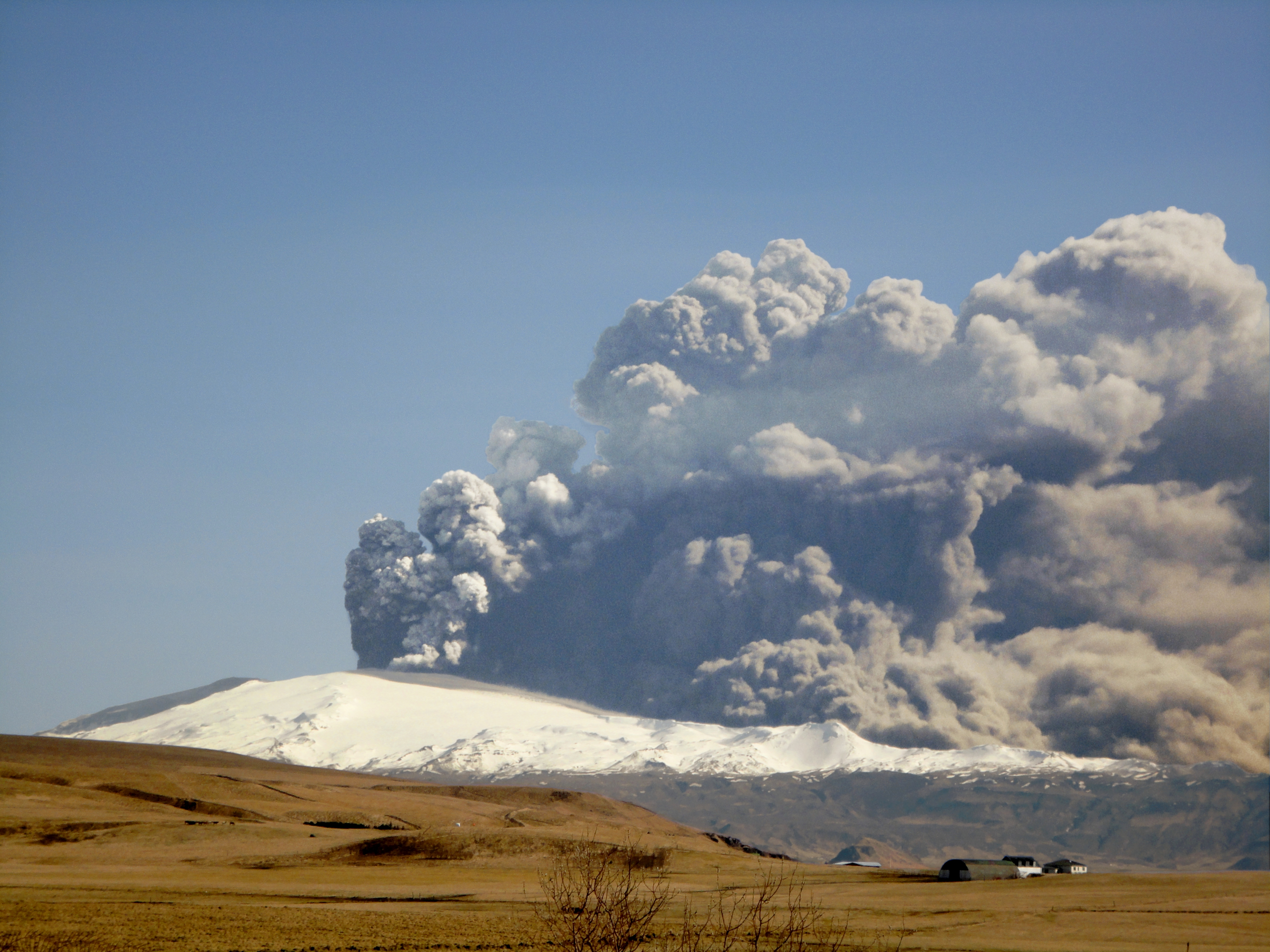
Ash plume rising from Eyjafjallajökull on April 17, 2010

Sulfate aerosols promote complex chemical reactions on their surfaces that alter chlorine and nitrogen chemical species in the stratosphere. This effect, together with increased stratospheric chlorine levels from chlorofluorocarbon pollution, generates chlorine monoxide (ClO), which destroys ozone (O_{3}). As the aerosols grow and coagulate, they settle down into the upper troposphere where they serve as nuclei for cirrus clouds and further modify the Earth's radiation balance. Most of the hydrogen chloride (HCl) and hydrogen fluoride (HF) are dissolved in water droplets in the eruption cloud and quickly fall to the ground as acid rain. The injected ash also falls rapidly from the stratosphere; most of it is removed within several days to a few weeks. Finally, explosive volcanic eruptions release the greenhouse gas carbon dioxide and thus provide a deep source of carbon for biogeochemical cycles.

Gas emissions from volcanoes are a natural contributor to acid rain. Volcanic activity releases about 130 to 230 teragrams (145 million to 255 million short tons) of carbon dioxide each year. Volcanic eruptions may inject aerosols into the Earth's atmosphere. Large injections may cause visual effects such as unusually colorful sunsets and affect global climate mainly by cooling it. Volcanic eruptions also provide the benefit of adding nutrients to soil through the weathering process of volcanic rocks. These fertile soils assist the growth of plants and various crops. Volcanic eruptions can also create new islands, as the magma cools and solidifies upon contact with the water.

== Earthquakes related to volcanism ==
Earthquakes can occur due to volcanic activity. These earthquakes could produce topographical deformation and/or destruction of buildings, homes, cars, etc. Two different types of these earthquakes can occur: volcano tectonic earthquakes and long period earthquakes. "Earthquakes produced by stress changes in solid rock due to the injection or withdrawal of magma (molton rock) are called volcano tectonic earthquakes". These are hazardous due to the possibility of ground cracks or slope failures, therefore destroying everything in its path. Long period earthquakes, which happen when magma is suddenly forced into the surrounding rocks, are generally seen as a precursor to the actual eruption.

== Examples ==
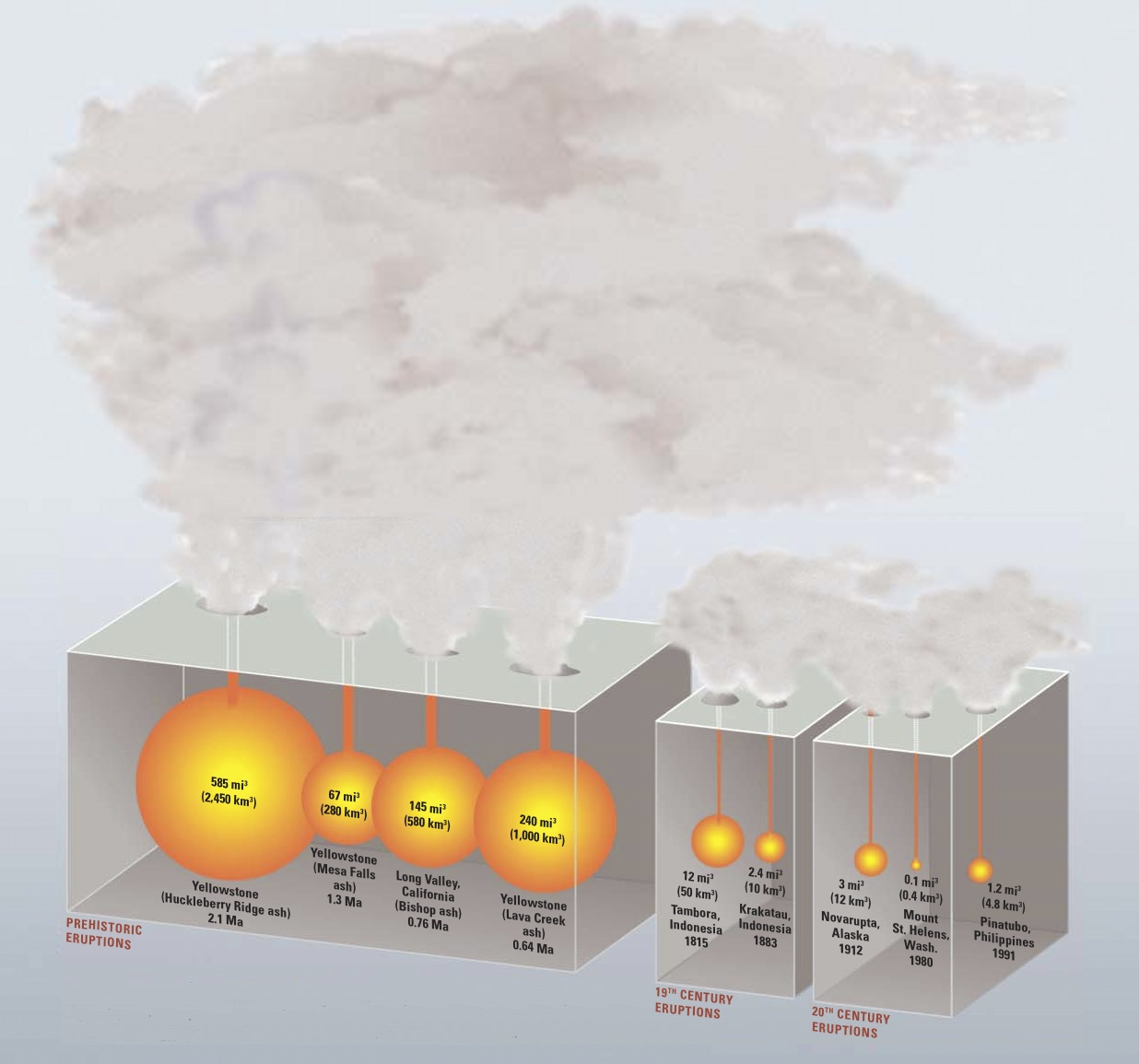
Comparison of major United States supereruptions (VEI 7 and 8) with major historical volcanic eruptions in the 19th and 20th century. From left to right: Yellowstone 2.1 Ma, Yellowstone 1.3 Ma, Long Valley 6.26 Ma, Yellowstone 0.64 Ma. 19th century eruptions: Tambora 1815, Krakatoa 1883. 20th century eruptions: Novarupta 1912, St. Helens 1980, Pinatubo 1991.

=== Prehistoric ===
A volcanic winter is thought to have taken place around 70,000 years ago after the supereruption of Lake Toba on Sumatra island in Indonesia. According to the Toba catastrophe theory to which some anthropologists and archeologists subscribe, it had global consequences, killing most humans then alive and creating a population bottleneck that affected the genetic inheritance of all humans today.

It has been suggested volcanic activity caused or contributed to the End-Ordovician, Permian-Triassic, Late Devonian mass extinctions, and possibly others. The massive eruptive event which formed the Siberian Traps, one of the largest known volcanic events of the last 500 million years of Earth's geological history, continued for a million years and is considered to be the likely cause of the "Great Dying" about 250 million years ago, which is estimated to have killed 90% of species existing at the time.

=== Historical ===
The 1815 eruption of Mount Tambora created global climate anomalies that became known as the "Year Without a Summer" because of the effect on North American and European weather. Agricultural crops failed and livestock died in much of the Northern Hemisphere, resulting in one of the worst famines of the 19th century.

The freezing winter of 1740–41, which led to widespread famine in northern Europe, may also owe its origins to a volcanic eruption.

== Monitoring and mitigation ==
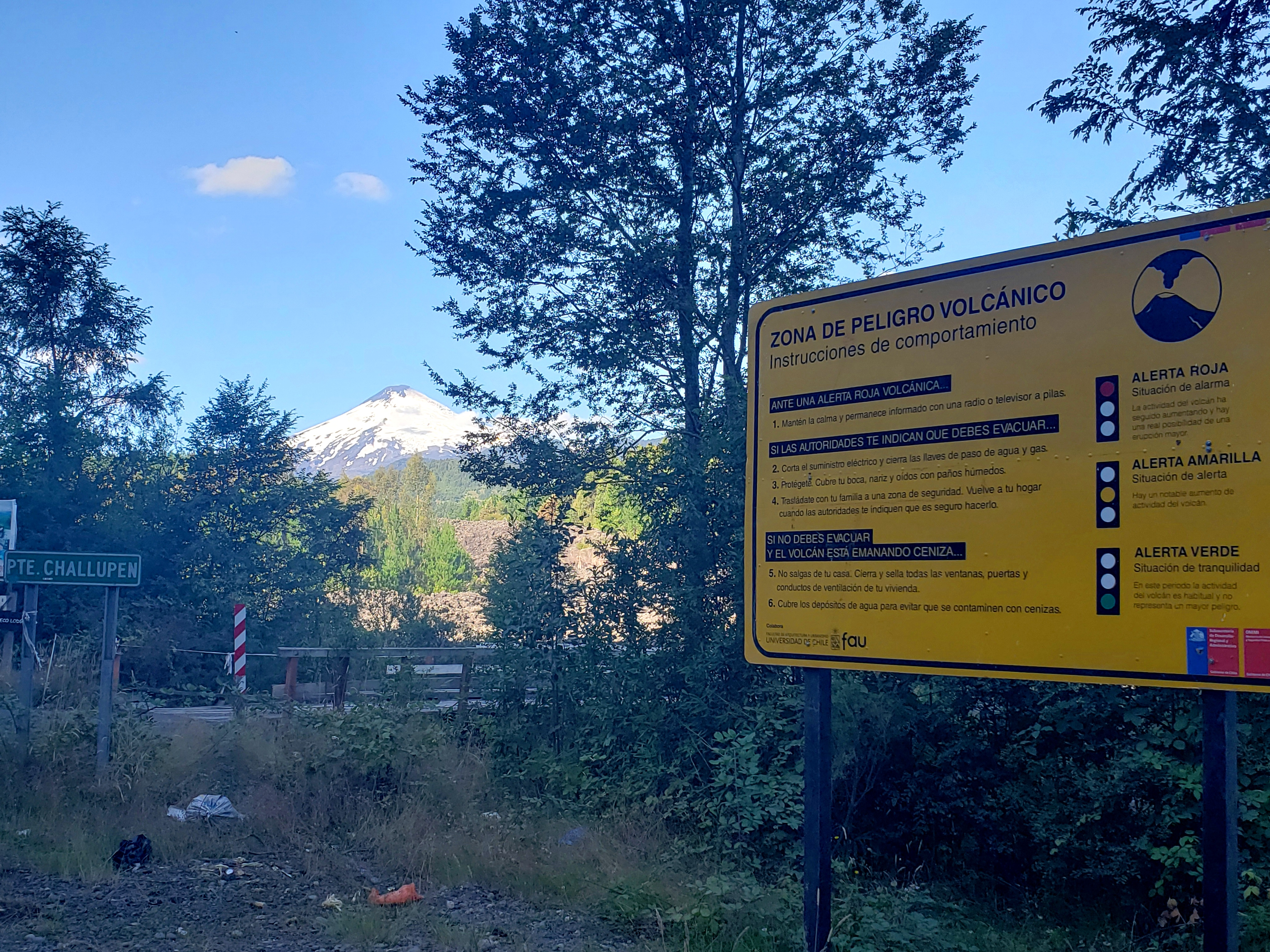
Warning sign of volcanic hazard in the surroundings of the Villarrica volcano, in Chile.

According to John Ewert and Ed Miller in a 1995 publication, "a great majority of the world's potentially active volcanoes are unmonitored". Of the historically active volcanoes in the world, less than one fourth are monitored. Only twenty-four volcanoes in the entire world are thoroughly monitored for activity. They also state that "seventy-five percent of the largest explosive eruptions since 1800 occurred at volcanoes that had no previous historical eruptions".

By monitoring the seismic and geological activity, the USGS can warn people ahead of time about impending danger. These volcanologists measure the size of an eruption in two ways: the eruption magnitude (by the volume or mass of magma erupted) and eruption intensity (by the rate of magma erupted). Various forms of satellites and imagery, such as satellite InSAR imagery, monitor the activity that isn't exposed to the naked eye.

Drones in combination with lightweight gas sensors become increasingly popular in volcanic monitoring, as the use of drones allows the researcher to increase the distance to the volcanic vent and therefore reduce the risk associated with gas sampling directly at the crater. Miniaturizing said systems offers the possibility to increase the measurement frequency by reducing weight and cost and therefore improve monitoring. Commonly measured gases are CO_{2} and SO_{2} which allow to detect upcoming changes in volcanic activity, as it was already shown at e.g. Etna, Italy.

However, the situation has somewhat changed with the International Decade for Natural Disaster Reduction and the Yokohama strategy since 1994. The Global Assessment of Risk (GAR) report is a biennial review and analysis of natural hazards published by the United Nations Office for Disaster Risk Reduction (UNISDR). The report implements the UN Hyogo Framework for Action.

Zadeh et al. (2014) provide an overview on Risks and Societal Implications of extreme natural hazards and an assessment of the global risk of volcanos and contains an appeal to found a worldwide volcanological organization comparable to the WMO. The EU has recently started major research programs dealing with risk assessment, compare:

- NOVAC - Network for Observation of Volcanic and Atmospheric Change,
- MULTIMO Multidisciplinary Monitoring, Modelling and Forecasting of Volcanic Hazard, Explosive Eruption Risk and Decision Support for EU Populations Threatened by Volcanoes,
- ERUPT Processes and Timescale of Magma Evolution in Volcanic Systems
- E-RUPTIONS A Satellite Telecommunication and Internet-Based Seismic Monitoring System for Volcanic Eruption Forecasting and Risk Management
- EXPLORIS Explosive Eruption Risk and Decision Support for EU Populations Threatened by Volcanoes

The British Geological Survey has various ongoing volcanology programs.

== See also ==
- Decade Volcanoes

== Bibliography ==
- Cutter, Susan, (1993) Living with Risk: The Geography of Technological Hazards, Edward Arnold Publishing ISBN 0-340-52987-3
- Decker, Robert and Barbara Decker (2006) Volcanoes, (4th ed.) W.H. Freeman and Company Publishing ISBN 0-7167-8929-9
- Ernst, G. G., M. Kervyn and R. M. Teeuw, Advances in the remote sensing of volcanic activity and hazards, with special consideration to applications in developing countries, International Journal of Remote Sensing; Nov 2008, Vol. 29 Issue 22
- Fauziati, S. and K. Watanabe, Ontology of Volcano System and Volcanic Hazards Assessment, International Journal of Geoinformatics; Dec 2010, Vol. 6 Issue 4 Article
- Kusky, Timothy (2008) Volcanoes: eruptions and other volcanic hazards, Infobase Publishing ISBN 0-8160-6463-6
- Lockwood, John P. (2010) Volcanoes : global perspectives, Wiley-Blackwell Publishing ISBN 978-1-4051-6250-0
- Martin, Thomas R., Alfred P. Wehner and John Butler, Evaluation of Physical Health Effects Due to Volcanic Hazards: The Use of Experimental Systems to Estimate the Pulmonary Toxicity of Volcanic Ash, American Journal of Public Health; Mar 86 Supplement, Vol. 76 Issue 3
- Olsen, Khris B. and Jonathan S. Fruchter, Identification of the Physical and Chemical Characteristics of Volcanic Hazards, American Journal of Public Health; Mar86 Supplement, Vol. 76 Issue 3
- Rosi, Mauro, Paolo Papale, Luca Lupe and Marco Stoppato, (2003) Volcanoes, Firefly Books Ltd Publishing ISBN 1-55297-683-1
- USGS, Living With Volcanoes The Geological Survey's Volcano Hazards Program. (1991). US Geological Survey Circular 1073.
- Zhong Lu, Jixian Zhang, Yonghong Zhang and Daniel Dzurisin, Monitoring and characterizing natural hazards with satellite InSAR imagery, Journal Annals of GIS; Mar 2010, Vol. 16 Issue 1
