= Briguglio =

Briguglio is a surname. Notable people with the surname include:

- Lino Briguglio, Maltese academic
- Salvatore Briguglio (1930–1978), American gangster
