= Lino Briguglio =

Maltese professor and politician

Lino Pascal Briguglio (born 27 January 1944 in Santa Venera) is a Maltese professor and politician. He is internationally known for his studies on islands and small states.

== Biography ==
=== Education ===
The son of Anthony Briguglio and Carmen née Pace, Lino Briguglio studied at St Aloysius' College and obtained a teacher’s certificate at St Michael's College of Education.

He earned a diploma in social studies at Plater College, Oxford in 1968-1970 and obtained several degrees at the University of Malta (Bachelor of Arts in 1972 and Master of Arts in 1977 in economics; diploma in theology, 1977) and a Ph.D. in economics at the University of Exeter in 1982.

=== Political career ===
A member of the Malta Labour Party's national executive committee in the mid-1970s, among other things Briguglio called on Labour members and supporters to "emancipate themselves from antiquated views which relegated women to mere appendages."

Briguglio was expelled from the executive committee in 1977 after he spoke out against political violence and in dissent with Mintoff's policy to merge the Labour Party with Malta's General Workers Union and to put the University of Malta under political control.

While appreciating Mintoff's social reforms, including the separation of Church and State, Briguglio considered his economic policies to be based on obsolete yet widespread assumptions that government would decide better than the private sector. Briguglio later wrote a book (L-Elementi Kriminali w Vjolenti Fi Hdan il-Partit Laburista, 1986) about how the violent and criminal elements in the Labour Party were not being controlled by Mintoff, and stated that the merger of the party and the union was key to control industrial conflict given Mintoff's wage suppression policy.

Briguglio later co-founded and was first general secretary of the Maltese Democratic Party (PDM), with which he contested the 1987 elections, obtaining a total of 380 votes and zero seats. He left politics since.

Briguglio was a core member of the Malta EU Steering and Action Committee during Malta's negotiations for EU membership.

=== Academic career ===
Briguglio started working as a primary school teacher in 1961.

Briguglio has been a lecturer in economics, starting in 1972 at the Malta College of Arts, Science and Technology (MCAST) and at the University of Malta since 1976.

He directs the Islands and Small States Institute of the University of Malta.

Formerly he was director of the University Gozo Campus and for a time also chaired the Board of Trustees of the Small States Network for Economic Development, which was funded by the World Bank.

He was Head of the Economics Department and of the Banking and Finance Department at the University of Malta, as well at CEO of the Foundation for International Studies, located in Valletta, Malta.

In 1992 Briguglio developed a vulnerability index (EVI) to describe the economic vulnerability of Small Island Developing States.

He has also written papers on economic resilience, one of which was published in Oxford Development Studies (Sept 2009). He has also edited a series of four books on Vulnerability, Resilience and Competitiveness of Small States, published by the University of Malta in collaboration with the Commonwealth Secretariat, and two books on small states published by Routledge.

=== Consultancies ===
Briguglio was a lead author for the Third, Fourth and Fifth Assessments Reports of the Intergovernmental Panel on Climate Change (IPCC), contributing mainly to the chapters on small islands’ vulnerability and adaptation to climate change. The work of the IPCC, including the contributions of many scientists, was recognised by the joint award of the 2007 Nobel Peace Prize. At a symposium in early 2010 at the University of Malta, Briguglio said that disbelief in climate change is "ideological, difficult to change and often rooted in rightwing sources".

Briguglio has acted as consultant to several international organisations including the UNDESA, UNEP, United Nations Development Program, the United Nations Conference on Trade and Development (UNCTAD), World Bank, the Commonwealth Secretariat, SOPAC and CARICOM on matters related to the economies of small states. He has represented the Maltese government in many international conferences dealing with islands’ and small states’ affairs. He is a member of the Malta Competition and Consumer Affairs Appeals Tribunal.

In 2022, Briguglio was appointed by the President of the UN General Assembly to join a 12-member high-level panel of experts on the development of a multidimensional vulnerability index for small island developing states.

=== Personal life ===
Lino Briguglio married Marie née Lucia in 1969; they have two children, Michael Briguglio and Marie Briguglio, both lecturers at the University of Malta. His son-in-law Stefano Moncada succeeded him as Director of the University of Malta's Islands and Small States Institute in 2020.
