= Maltese Democratic Party =

Short-lived anti-establishment Maltese political party

Maltese Democratic Party Partit Demokratiku Malti
- Abbreviation: PDM
- Leader: Lino Briguglio
- President: Michael Vella
- Founder: Lino Briguglio
- Split from: Labour
- Colors: Green; Yellow

The Maltese Democratic Party (Maltese: Partit Demokratiku Malti; PDM) was a short-lived Maltese political party formed by Lino Briguglio to contest the 1987 general elections. The party ran four candidates across eight of the thirteen electoral districts. The party ran with the slogan "The Citizens first!", this slogan would later be adopted ten years after by the Labour Party.

== Election results ==
Election	Leader	Seats contested	Votes	%	Seats	Rank	Status
1987	Lino Briguglio	8 / 69	380	0.16	0 / 69	3rd	Extraparliamentary
