= Host factor =

Host factor (sometimes known as risk factor) is a medical term referring to the traits of an individual person or animal that affect susceptibility to disease, especially in comparison to other individuals. The term arose in the context of infectious disease research, in contrast to "organism factors", such as the virulence and infectivity of a microbe. Host factors that may vary in a population and affect disease susceptibility can be innate or acquired.

Some examples:

- general health
- psychological characteristics and attitude
- nutritional state
- social ties
- previous exposure to the organism or related antigens
- haplotype or other specific genetic differences of immune function
- substance abuse
- race

The term is now used in oncology and many other medical contexts related to individual differences of disease vulnerability.

== See also ==
- Vulnerability index
- Epidemiology
- Immunology
