= 1987 Maltese general election =

- 9 May 1987
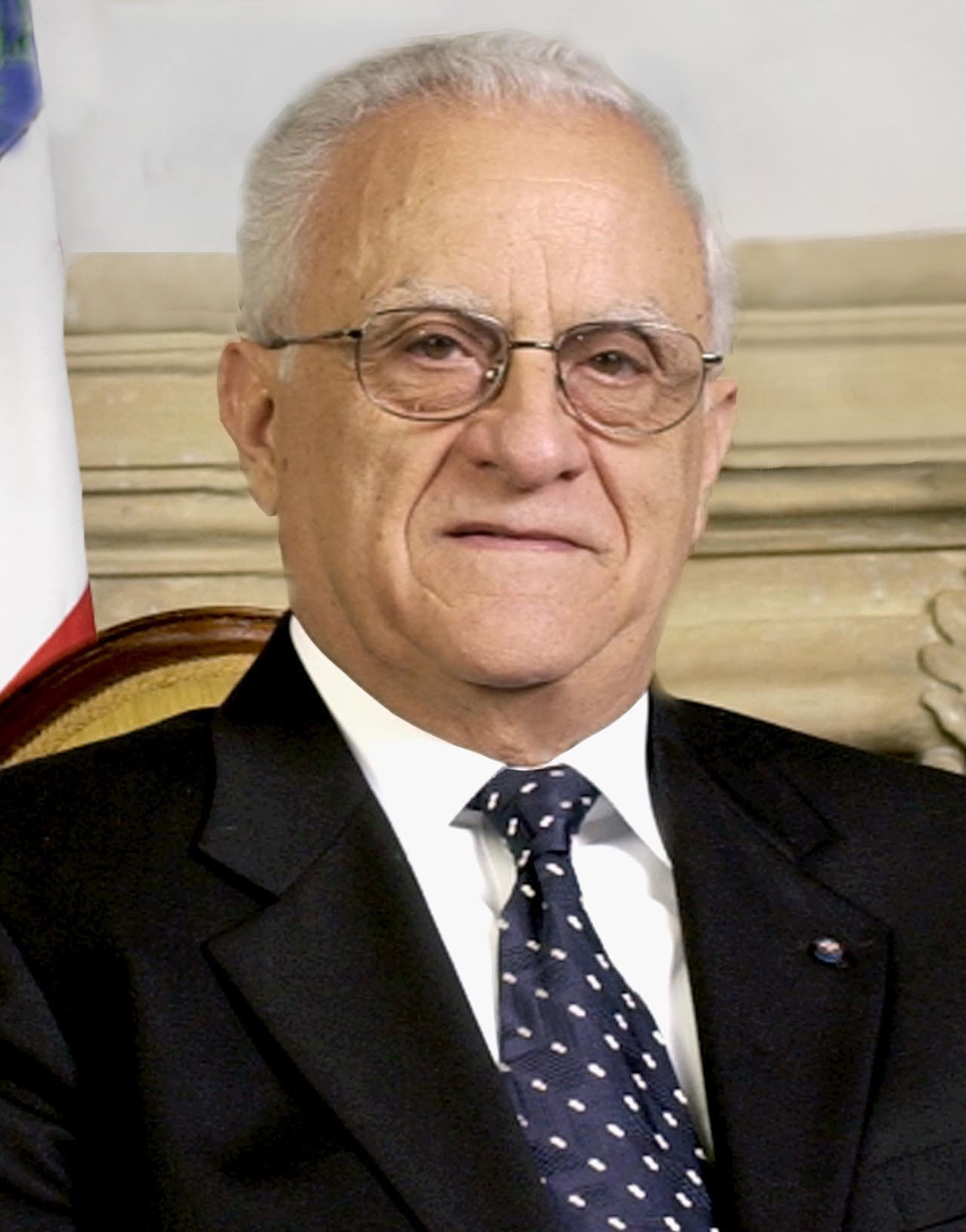
| | First party | Second party |
|---|---|---|
| Leader | Eddie Fenech Adami | Mifsud Bonnici |
| Party | Nationalist | Labour |
| Last election | 50.92%, 31 seats | 49.07%, 34 seats |
| Seats won | 35 | 34 |
| Seat change | ▲4 | Steady |
| Popular vote | 119,721 | 114,936 |
| Percentage | 50.91% | 48.87% |
| Swing | ▼0.01pp | ▼0.20pp |
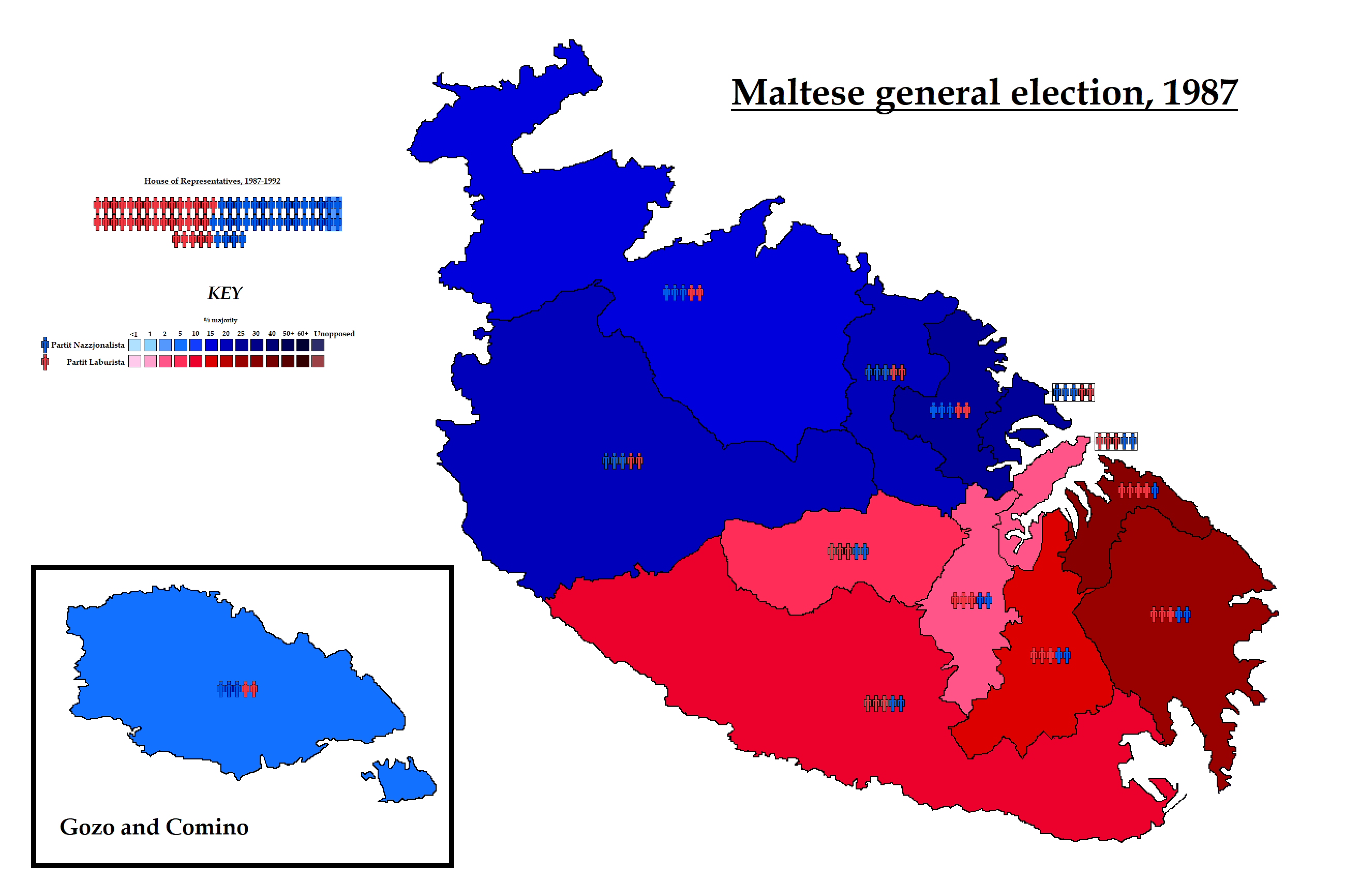
Prime Minister before election
Mifsud Bonnici
Labour
Elected Prime Minister
Eddie Fenech Adami
Nationalist

General elections were held in Malta on 9 May 1987. The Nationalist Party won a majority of votes and won a one-seat majority in the unicameral legislature. Although the Nationalist Party received the most votes, the Malta Labour Party won a majority of seats. However, in accordance with the modifications made to the electoral system following a similar outcome in the 1981 elections, the Nationalist Party was awarded an extra four seats in order to give them a parliamentary majority.

The elections ended 16 years of Labour government, with Nationalist Party leader Eddie Fenech Adami becoming Prime Minister. Adami stated that he would align the country more closely with Western governments and distance Malta from Muammar Gaddafi.

== Results ==
| Party | Votes | % | Seats | +/– |
|---|---|---|---|---|
| Nationalist Party | 119,721 | 50.91 | 35 | +4 |
| Malta Labour Party | 114,936 | 48.87 | 34 | 0 |
| Maltese Democratic Party | 380 | 0.16 | 0 | New |
| Communist Party of Malta | 119 | 0.05 | 0 | New |
| Independents | 12 | 0.01 | 0 | 0 |
| Total | 235,168 | 100.00 | 69 | +4 |
| Valid votes | 235,168 | 99.34 | | |
| Invalid/blank votes | 1,551 | 0.66 | | |
| Total votes | 236,719 | 100.00 | | |
| Registered voters/turnout | 246,292 | 96.11 | | |
Source: Nohlen & Stöver
