= Vulnerability index =

Measure of the exposure of a population to some hazard

A vulnerability index is a measure of the exposure of a population to some hazard. Typically, the index is a composite of multiple quantitative indicators that via some formula, delivers a single numerical result. Through such an index "diverse issues can be combined into a standardised framework...making comparisons possible". For instance, indicators from the physical sciences can be combined with social, medical and even psychological variables to evaluate potential complications for disaster planning.

The origin of vulnerability indexes as a policy planning tool began with the United Nations Environmental Program. One of the participants in the early task forces has also conducted secondary research documenting the evolution of the analytic tool through various stages. The term and methodology then expanded through medical literature and social work as discussed by Dr. James O'Connell of Boston Healthcare for the Homeless.

== Basic methodology ==
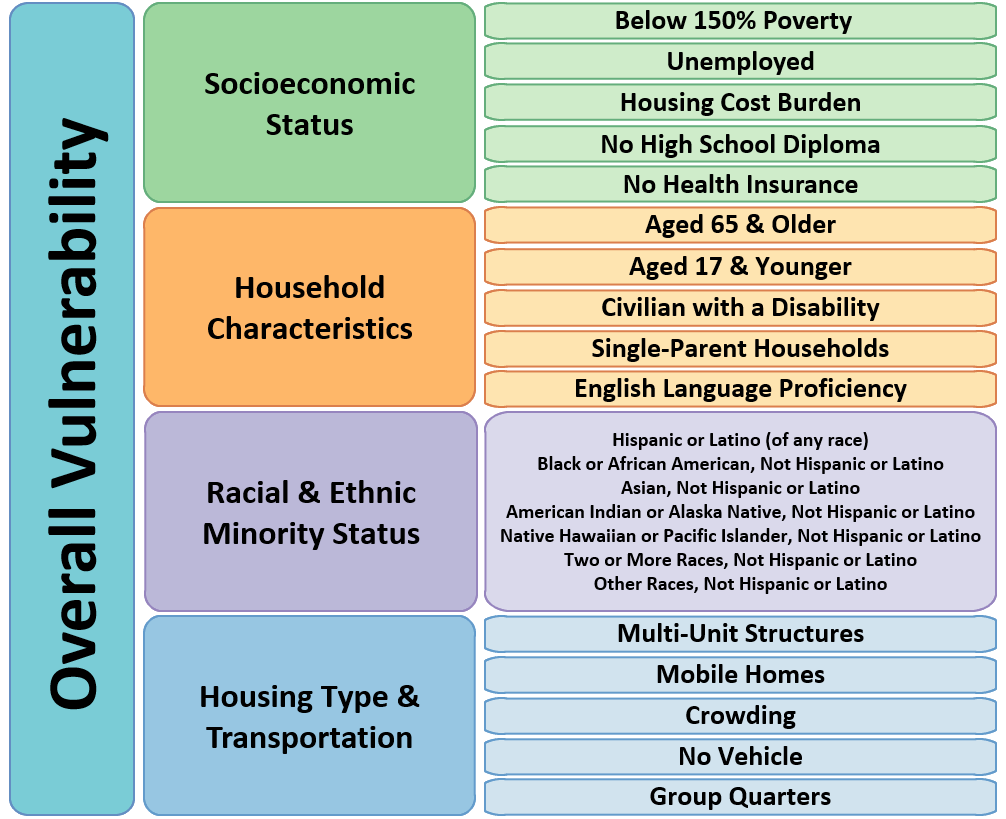
CDC/ATSDR Social Vulnerability Index variables grouped into four themes

The basic methodology of constructing a vulnerability index is described by University of Malta researcher Lino Briguglio who developed an economic vulnerability index (EVI) for describing the economic vulnerability of Small Island Developing States (SIDS). The individual measures are weighted according to their relative importance. A cumulative score is then generated, typically by adding the weighted values. Decision trees can evaluate alternative policy options. Much of the original research has been evaluated by Lino Briguglio and presenters at Oxford, providing a body of secondary source material.

== Earlier use ==
A composite vulnerability index grew out of the work of South Pacific Applied Geoscience Commission (SOPAC), Fiji, and the Expert Group on Vulnerability Indexes affiliated with the United Nations, in response to a call made in the Barbados Plan of Action, the Alliance of Small Island States (AOSIS).

Bruguglio participated in development of the vulnerability index model for international organizations of small island developing states. University of Malta also hosts the Islands and Small States Institute, Foundation for International Studies. Other institutional participants included the New Zealand Official Development Assistance (NZODA) Programme. In 1996, the concept of a composite vulnerability index had been tentatively taken up by Commonwealth policy analysts. In 1997, official background papers of the SIDS unit reflected the term "vulnerability index" at least internally. It was also advanced in Commonwealth channels. By 1997, the term was approved for publication by the staff of the UN Secretary General in the SG's Report on Development of a Vulnerability Index for SIDS. This concept was subsequently adopted by other experts in that field. and explicitly named as such.

In a 1999 Technical Report for SOPAC, Kaly et al. discussed more focused vulnerability indexes. A subsection of that report was entitled "Vulnerability index – environment" and the report also discussed the concept of "Environmental vulnerability index".

== Extension of the general concept ==
The IPCC embraced vulnerability as a key category in 2001. A 2002 paper then applied a vulnerability indexing model to analysis of vulnerability to sea level rise for a US coastal community. At a 2008 Capacity Building Seminar at Oxford, the "Climate Vulnerability Index" was presented with an application to the protection of tourist economies, which may be important to small island states and others. By the time of this seminar, vulnerability indexes were established as governance tools. However, despite existing vulnerability assessment methodologies, vulnerability assessments are heavily influenced by data availability, data reliability, extent, scale, rating methods of vulnerability indicators, and interpretation of the 'vulnerability' and related concepts. As a result, there are many frameworks and indices available which are attuned to specific systems, areas, or circumstances, rather than a comprehensive definition or framework.

== In hazard planning ==
The concept has been extended and applied in dealing with risk from natural hazards and the part that population metrics play in making such a situation into a disaster. In the USA this has been done at a county level. And is run by the Hazards and Vulnerability Research Institute since 2003.

=== In medicine ===
In 2005 a "Histopathological Plaque Vulnerability Index" was proposed.

== See also ==
- Disaster planning
- Emergency medicine
- Epidemiology
- Host factor
- Immunology
- Infectious disease
- Mortality rate
- Standardized mortality ratio
- Triage
