= Susan Cutter =

American geographer and disaster researcher

Susan Lynn Cutter
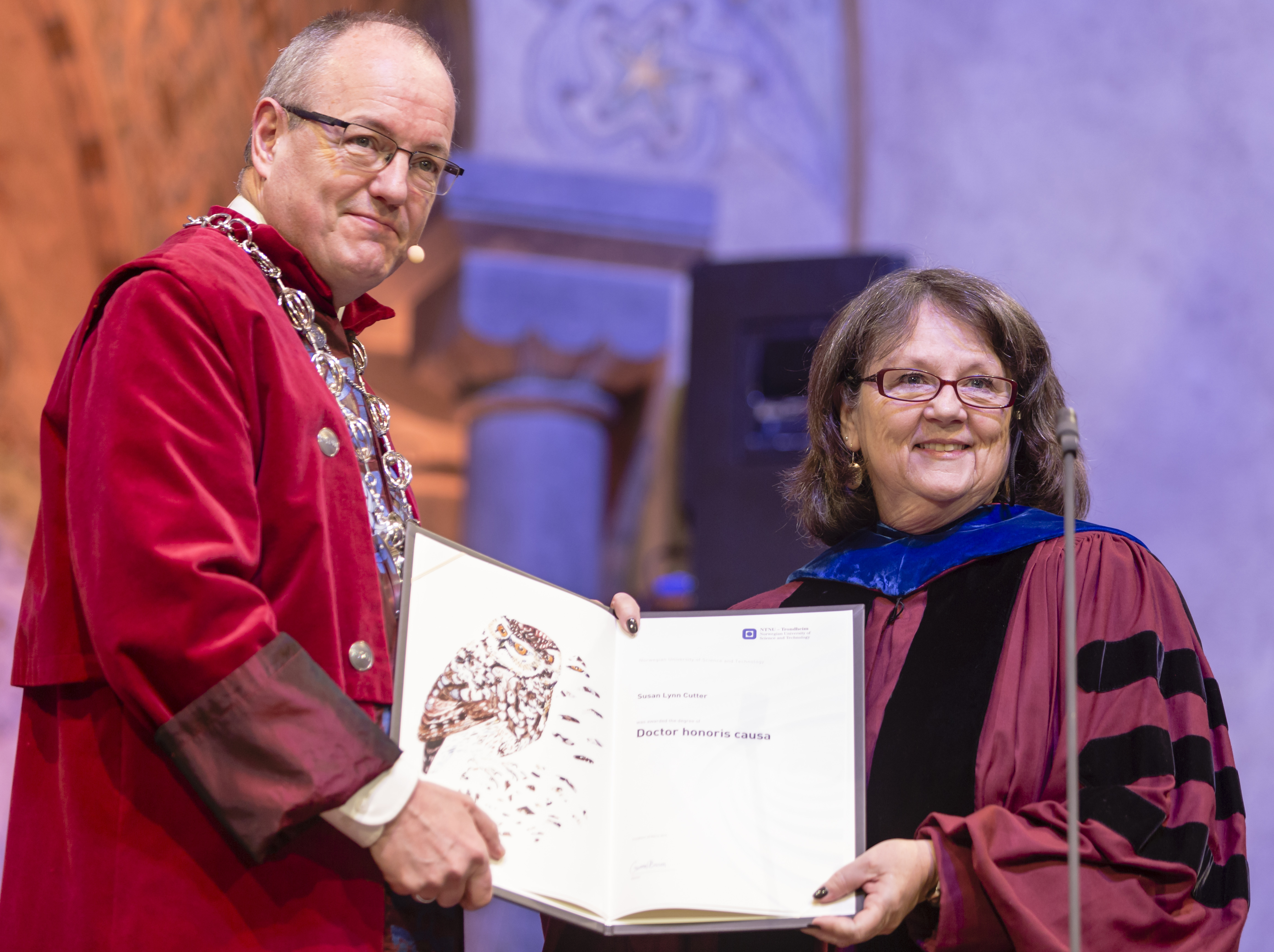
- Born: 1950 (age 75–76); Cincinnati, Ohio U.S.
- Education: California State University, Hayward, University of Chicago
- Scientific career
- Fields: geographer, disaster research
- Workplaces: University of Washington, Rutgers University. University Institute for Environment and Human Security, University of South Carolina

Susan Lynn Cutter (born 1950) is an American geographer and disaster researcher who is a Carolina Distinguished Professor of Geography and director of the Hazards and Vulnerability Research Institute at the University of South Carolina. She is the author or editor of many books on disasters and disaster recovery. Her areas of expertise include the factors that make people and places susceptible to disasters, how people recover from disasters, and how to map disasters and disaster hazards. She chaired a committee of the National Research Council that in 2012 recommended more open data in disaster-monitoring systems, more research into disaster-resistant building techniques, and a greater emphasis on the ability of communities to recover from future disasters.

== Education and career ==
Cutter was born in Cincinnati, Ohio. She did her undergraduate studies at California State University, Hayward, graduating in 1973, and moved to the University of Chicago for graduate study in geography. She earned a master's degree from Chicago in 1974, and completed her doctorate there in 1976.

Before joining the South Carolina faculty in 1993, Cutter worked for the University of Washington and Rutgers University. She also worked from 2009 to 2012 at the University Institute for Environment and Human Security, in Bonn, Germany, as Munich Re Foundation Chair on Social Vulnerability.

== Awards and honors ==
Cutter became a Fellow of the American Association for the Advancement of Science in 1999. She served as president of the American Association of Geographers for 1999–2000. The association gave her their Decade of Behavior Award in 2006, their Lifetime Achievement Award in 2010, and their Presidential Achievement Award in 2018.

She became Carolina Distinguished Professor in 2001. In 2015 the Norwegian University of Science and Technology gave her an honorary doctorate and she was made a member of the Royal Norwegian Society of Sciences and Letters. In 2024, Cutter was elected to the National Academy of Sciences.

== Books ==
Cutter's books include:

- Rating Places: A Geographer's View on Quality of Life (Association of American Geographers, 1985)
- Exploitation, Conservation, Preservation: A Geographic Perspective on Natural Resource Use (with William H. Renwick, Wiley, 1991; 4th ed., 2003)
- Environmental Risks and Hazards (Prentice-Hall, 1994)
- Living with Risk: The Geography of Technological Hazards (Wiley, 1995)
- South Carolina Atlas of Environmental Risks and Hazards (with Deborah S. K. Thomas, Micah E. Cutler, Jerry T. Mitchell, and Michael S. Scott, University of South Carolina Press, 1999)
- American Hazardscapes: The Regionalization of Hazards and Disasters (edited, National Academies Press / Joseph Henry Press, 2001)
- The Geographical Dimensions of Terrorism (edited with Douglas B. Richardson and Thomas J. Wilbanks, Routledge, 2003)
- Geography and Technology (edited with Stanley D. Brunn and J. W Harrington Jr., Kluwer, 2004)
- Hazards, Vulnerability and Environmental Justice (edited, Routledge, 2006)
- Hurricane Katrina and the Forgotten Coast of Mississippi (with Christopher T. Emrich, Jerry T. Mitchell, Walter W. Piegorsch, Mark M. Smith, and Lynn Weber, Cambridge University Press, 2014)
