= Village (disambiguation) =

A village is a settlement larger than a hamlet but smaller than a town.

Village or The Village may also refer to:

== Forms of administration ==
- Village (Taiwan), the basic unit of Taiwanese administrative subdivision
- Village (United States), a type of administrative division at the local government level
  - Village (New Jersey)
  - Village (Pennsylvania)
  - Village (Oregon)
  - Village (Vermont)
- Villages of Brunei, an administrative division

== Places ==
=== Canada ===
- Victoria, Newfoundland and Labrador, known as The Village
- Village Island, British Columbia

=== Ireland ===
- Cloughjordan Ecovillage, formerly The Village, Co Tipperary
- Malahide Cricket Club Ground, or The Village

=== United Kingdom ===
- Village (Barking and Dagenham ward), an electoral ward in England
- Village (Merton ward), an electoral ward of Merton London Borough Council, England
- Village (Southwark ward), a former electoral ward in England
- Village (Trafford ward), a former electoral ward in Greater Manchester, England
- The Village, East Kilbride, South Lanarkshire, Scotland
- The Village, an area near Donegall Road in Belfast, Northern Ireland
- The Village, a settlement in Windsor Great Park, England

=== United States ===
- Village Number 1, Alabama, also known as "The Village"
- Village, Arkansas
- Village of La Jolla, La Jolla, California
- The Village at Corte Madera, a shopping center in California
- Castle Pines Village, Colorado, also known as The Village at Castle Pines
- The Villages, Florida, a Master-planned, age-restricted retirement community
- The Village Shopping Center, in Gary, Indiana
- Greenwich Village, or the Village, New York City
- The Village, Jersey City, New Jersey
- The Village, Oklahoma
- Village Arcade, a shopping center in Rice Village, Houston, Texas

=== Elsewhere ===
- Village, Jamaica, a settlement in Portland parish, Jamaica
- Village, a town in Sud-Est Department, Haiti
- Edinburgh of the Seven Seas, locally referred to as The Village
- The Village, a zone in San Ġwann, Malta

== Arts, entertainment and media ==
=== Films ===
- The Village (1953 film), a Swiss drama
- The Village, a 1968 documentary by Paul Hockings
- The Village (2004 film), a US thriller
- The Village (2015 film), a Georgian drama
- The Village (2023 film), a Japanese drama film featuring Ryusei Yokohama
- The Village (animated short film), a 1993 British short animated film

=== Music ===
- Village (album), by Wallace Roney, 1997
- "Villages", a 2010 song by Alpine
- "The Village", a song by New Order on the 1983 album Power, Corruption & Lies
- "The Village", a 2017 single by Wrabel

=== Literature ===
- The Village (Anand novel), by Mulk Raj Anand, 1910
- The Village (Bunin novel), by Ivan Bunin, 1939
- The Village (Grigorovich novel), by Dmitry Grigorovich, 1846
- The Village, a 1966 novel by Thomas Hinde
- The Village, a 2012 novel by Nikita Lalwani
- "The Village" (poem), by George Crabbe, 1783
- "The Village" (short story), by Kate Wilhelm, 1973
- Village (magazine), an Irish current affairs and cultural magazine

=== Television ===
- The Village (1993 TV series), British series and former radio programme
- The Village (2013 TV series), a British drama
- The Village (2019 TV series), an American drama
- The Village (2023 TV series), an Indian horror thriller
- The Village (The Prisoner), the fictional setting of the 1960s TV series
- The Village: Achiara's Secret, a 2015 South Korean drama series

=== Other uses in arts, entertainment and media ===
- Village (board game), 2011
- Resident Evil Village, or Village, a 2021 video game

== Businesses and organizations ==
- The Village (Hartford, Connecticut), an American social service agency
- The Village (music venue), in Dublin
- The Village (studio), in West Los Angeles, U.S.
- Village Community Co-operative, a multiple occupancy permaculture project in Adelaide, Australia
- Village Food Stores, a chain of supermarkets in New Brunswick, Canada, 1987–95

== Other uses ==
- Dromara Village F.C., an association football club in Northern Ireland, UK
- Magheralin Village F.C., an association football club in Northern Ireland, UK
- Mark Village (born 1991), Canadian soccer player
- MSN Games, formerly The Village, a gaming web site

== See also ==
- Village Creek (disambiguation)
- Village Green (disambiguation)
- Villager (disambiguation)
