= The Villagers =

The Villagers may refer to:

- The Villagers (TV series), the 1970s era South African television soap opera
- The Villagers (film), the 2018 South Korean action thriller film

== See also ==
- Village (disambiguation)
