= Villager =

Villager may refer to:

- A person who resides in a village

== Newspapers ==
- The Villager (Austin, Texas), a free weekly newspaper of Austin, Texas, serving the African-American community
- The Villager, a weekly newspaper in Namibia
- The Villager (Saint Paul, Minnesota), a community newspaper in Saint Paul, Minnesota, United States
- The Villager (Manhattan), a newspaper in Manhattan, New York, United States
- The Villager (The Woodlands, Texas), a newspaper in The Woodlands, Texas, United States

== Entertainment ==
- Villagers (band), an Irish band from Dún Laoghaire
- The Villagers (TV series), the 1970s era South African television soap opera
- The Villagers, a 2018 South Korean action thriller film

=== Fictional characters ===
- Villager (Animal Crossing), playable characters in Animal Crossing
- Villagers, non-playable characters found in villages in Minecraft

== Other uses ==
- Mercury Villager, a minivan
- Edsel Villager, a station wagon
- Villager, a defunct motel chain owned by Cendant which was merged into Knights Inn in 2004
- Villager Football Club, a rugby club in Cape Town, South Africa
- Villager Mall, a former name of Village on Park Street in Madison, Wisconsin

== See also ==
- The Village (disambiguation)
