= Our Lady of Lourdes Parish Church, San Ġwann =

Coordinates: 35°54′28″N 14°28′37″E

Our Lady of Lourdes Parish Church
- Knisja Parrokkjali Madonna ta' Lourdes
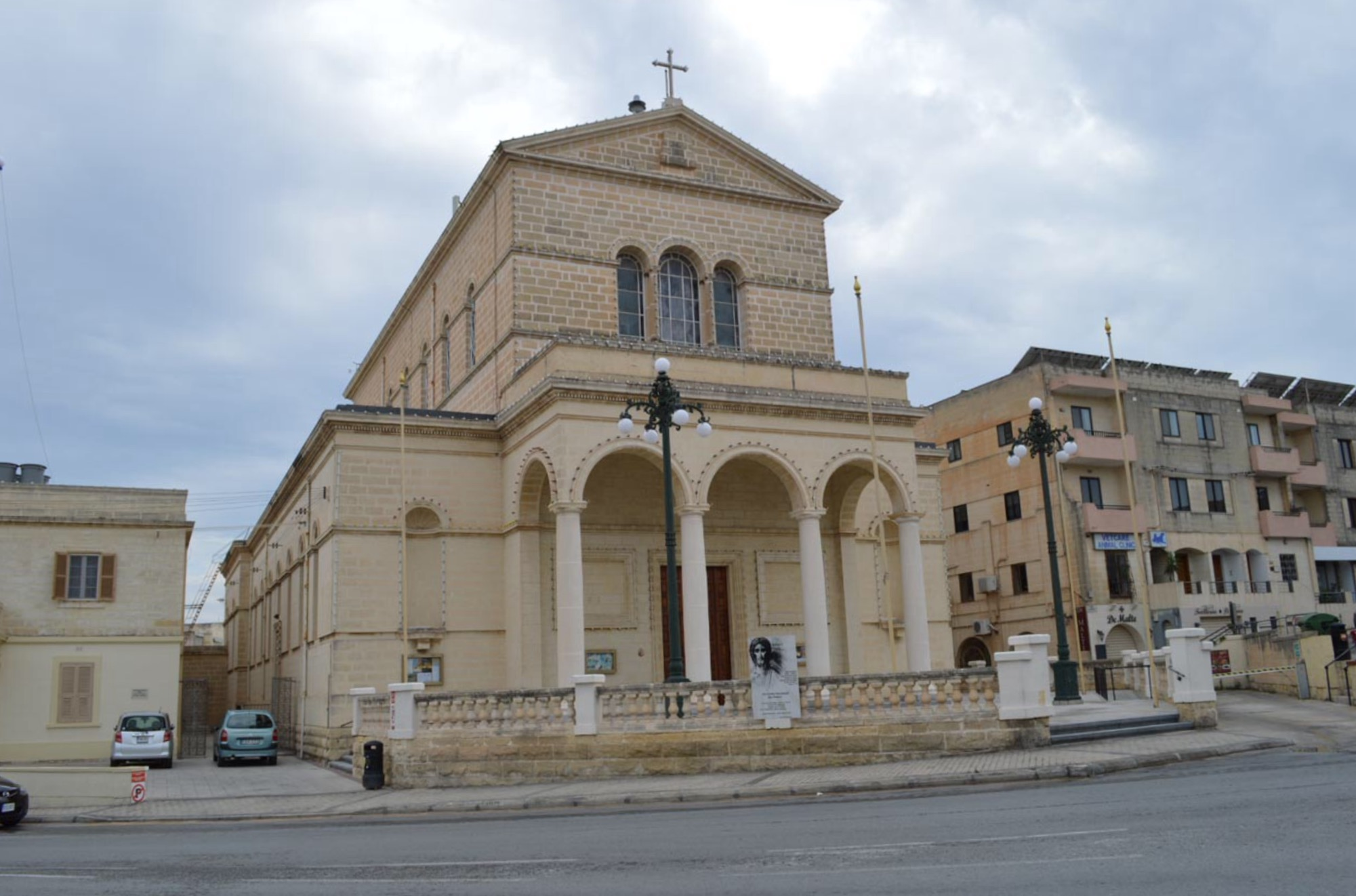
- Street view of the Parish Church
- Our Lady of Lourdes Parish Church
- Location: San Ġwann
- Country: Malta
- Denomination: Roman Catholic
- Religious institute: Order of Friars Minor Capuchin
- Website: parrocci.knisja.mt/parrocca/san-gwann

History
- Status: Parish church
- Dedication: Our Lady of Lourdes
- Dedicated: December 20, 1959
- Consecrated: May 12, 1962
- Events: First Sunday of August

Architecture
- Functional status: Active
- Architect: Ġużé Colombo
- Architectural type: NeoClassical
- Groundbreaking: September 13, 1953
- Completed: December 20, 1959

Specifications
- Length: 35.66m
- Width: 19.5m
- Materials: Maltese Limestone

Administration
- Archdiocese: Roman Catholic Archdiocese of Malta
- Parish: September 21, 1965
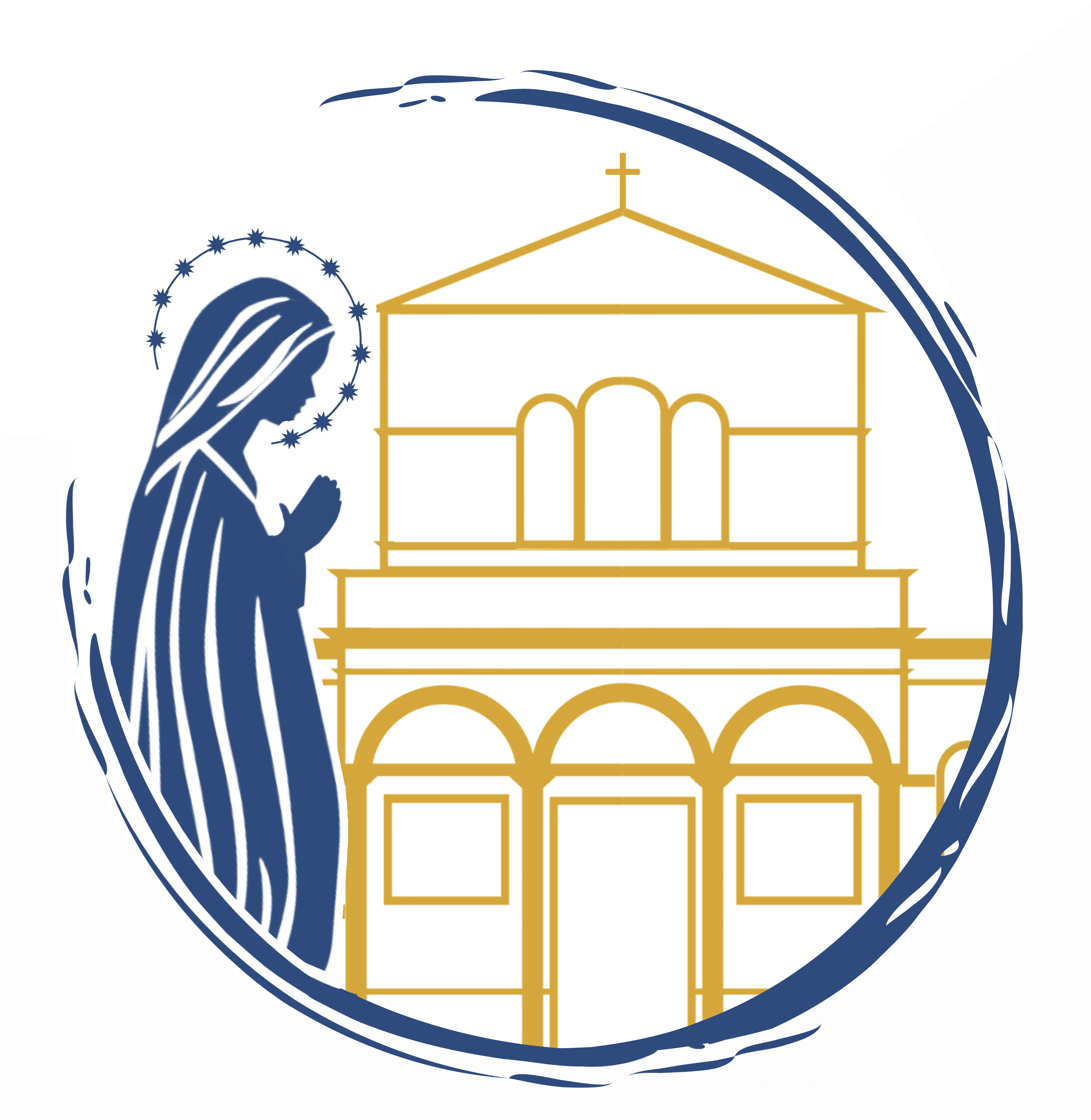

Our Lady of Lourdes Parish Church (Maltese: Knisja Parrokkjali Madonna ta' Lourdes) is a Roman Catholic parish church in San Ġwann, Malta. Dedicated to Our Lady of Lourdes, it falls within the jurisdiction of the Roman Catholic Archdiocese of Malta and is administered by the Order of Friars Minor Capuchin. (OFM Cap.)

== History ==
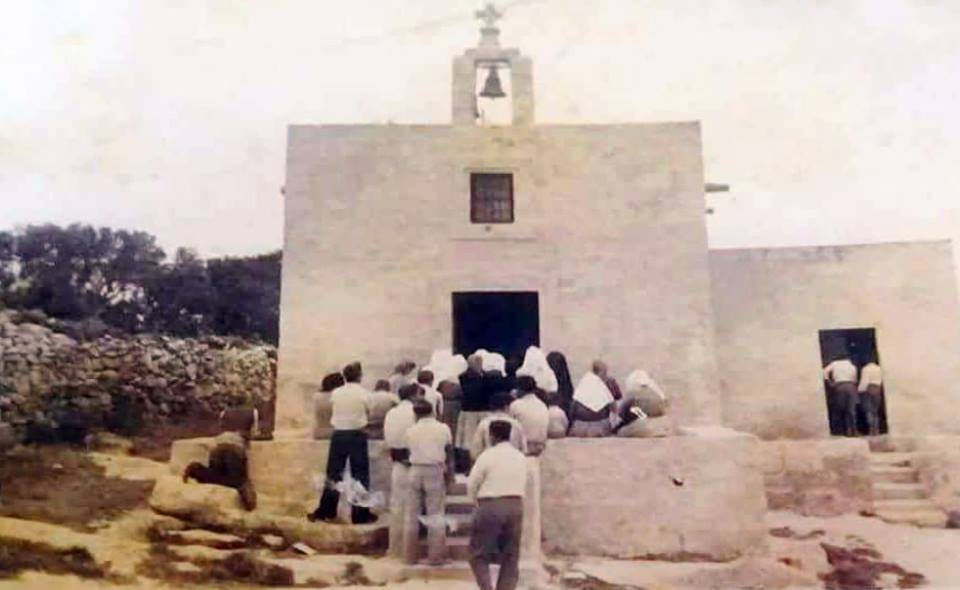
An old photo of San Ġwann tal-Għargħar chapel

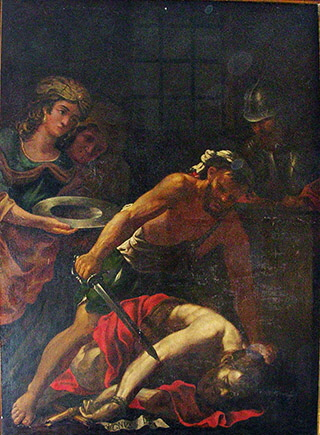
San Ġwann tal-Għargħar Chapel Titular Painting

When the areas between Birkirkara and Sliema started to develop after the Second World War, the Archbishop of that time, Mons. Michael Gonzi, asked the Capuchin Friars to take care of the spiritual life of the people. The Capuchin Friars took responsibility for the Imsieraħ locality on February 21, 1947. The first friars were Fr Feliċ Scicluna, Fr Joseph Mary Spiteri, and Fr Teophilus Ebejer, who took temporary residence at 152, Triq San Ġiljan, near the Chapel of San Ġwann tal-Għorgħar.

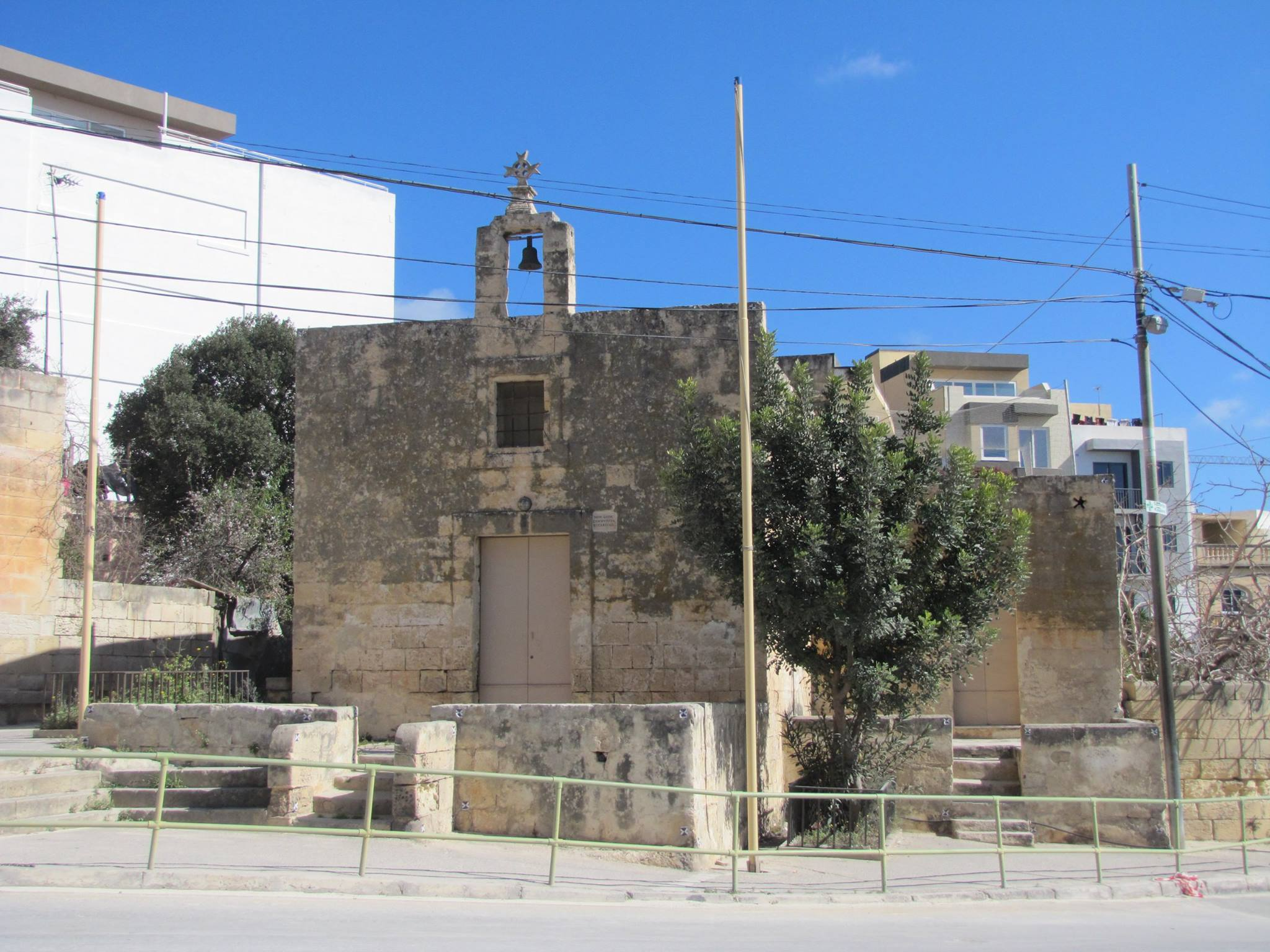
Present day, San Ġwann tal-Għargħar Chapel

For this purpose, a plan was prepared to build a church and a convent. These had to be paid for, according to his own wish, byĠużeppi Borg, a businessman from Birkirkara. Borg wanted to build a temple to Our Lady under the title of Sorrows. It was decided to build the convent first and then the church. The architect was Ġuze Colombo and the supervisor was Feliċ Mifsud. On November 3, 1949, work began to build a convent and a church based on the general outline of Rome's Basilica of St. Paul outside the Walls. The first floor of the convent was finished by September 15, 1950. The upper floor was built a number of years later.

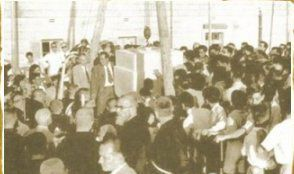
San Ġwann Church - Laying of the foundation stone on the 13 September 1953

The blessing of the convent was done by Archbishop Michael Gonzi in the presence of the Provincial, of Ġuzeppi and his son Feliċ Borg, as well as some of the Canons of the Collegiate Basilica of Sant' Elena of Birkirkara. On September 16, 1950, Father Anton Dimech, Provincial of the Capuchins, led a processional procession of the Holy Sacrament from the Chapel of San Ġwann tal-Għorgħar to the provisional convent.

The new church foundation stone was laid on September 13, 1953, and blessed by Bishop Mons. Emanuel Galea. To be completed and inaugurated on December 20, 1959.

The church is dedicated to Our Lady under the title of the Immaculate Conception of Lourdes.

On June 12, 1959, with the consent of Borg and with the approval of Archbishop Gonzi and the Provincial of the Capuchins at that time, the agreement was changed to change the title of the church to Our Lady of Lourdes. It was officially consecrated on May 12, 1962.

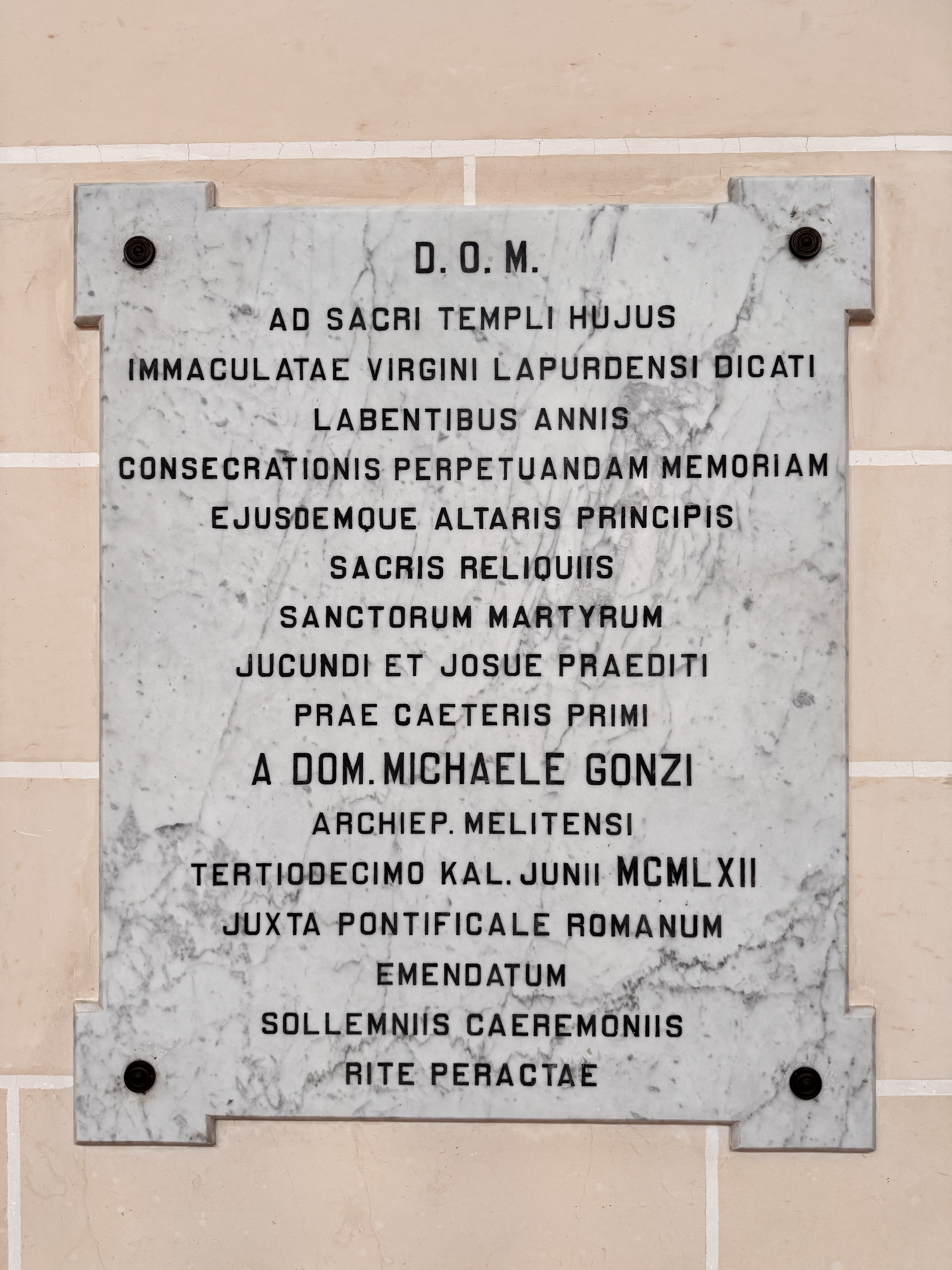
The Marble plaque found inside the Church.

== Interior ==
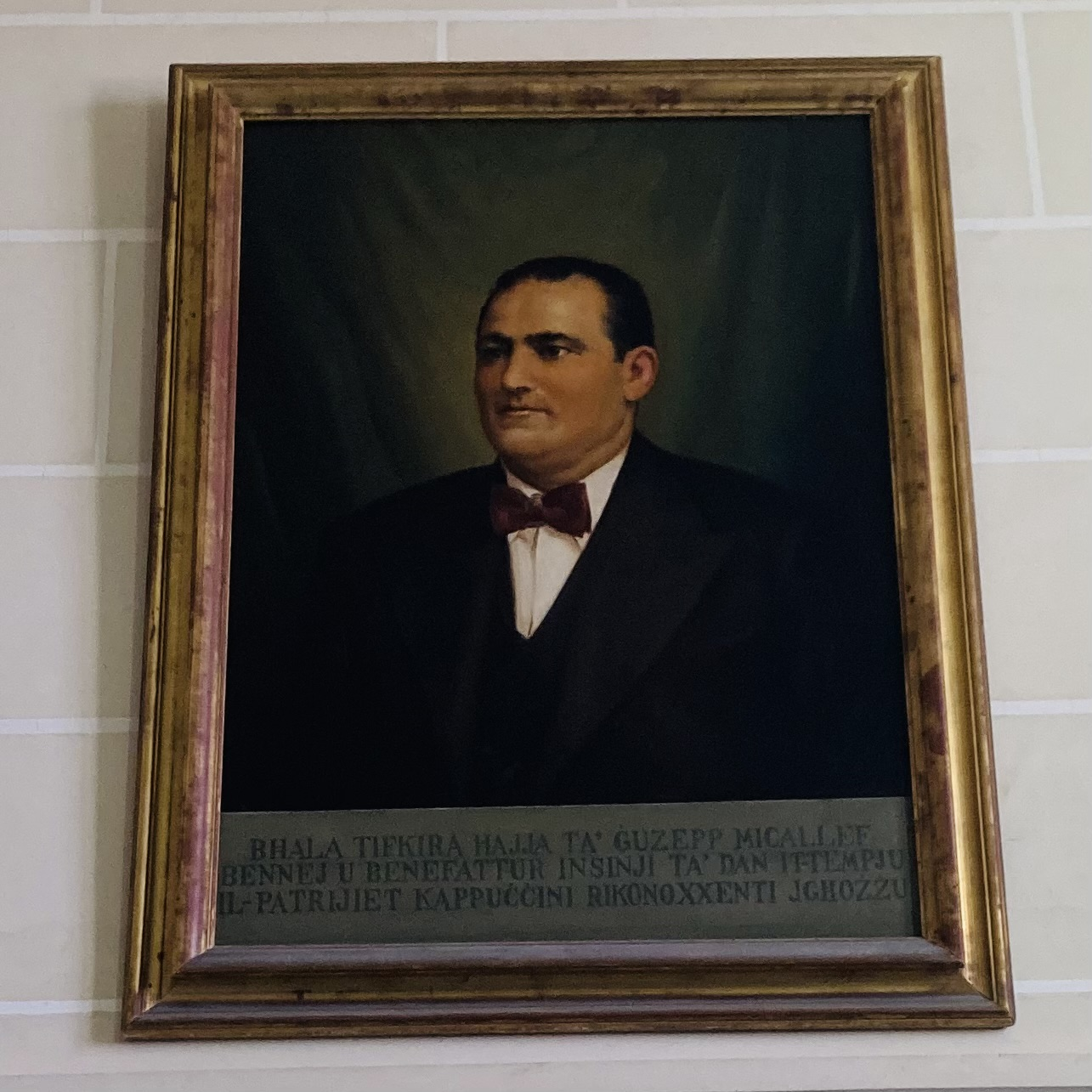
Ġużeppi Micallef - Builder and benefactor of the Church.

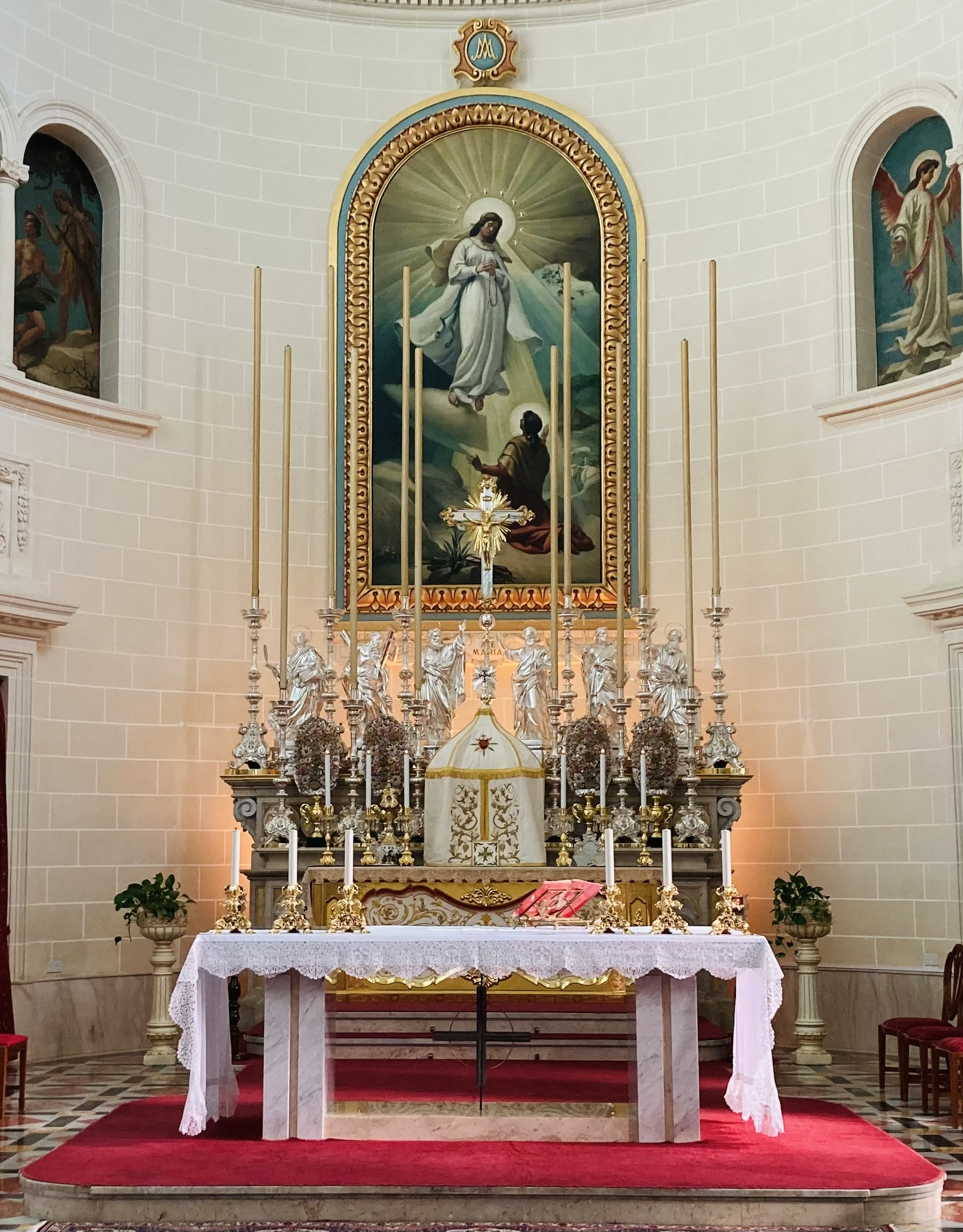
Our Lady of Lourdes Altar decorated during the Feast Week in 2022

The altar of the church is a work of marble from Pietra Santa di Lucca, Italy. It was put into place in October 1961. On the facade of the first step, there are ten medallions with the figures of some prophets and other biblical characters, which we consider to be figures of Our Lady. In the middle of the altar is the bronze tabernacle, covered from the inside with silver sheets.

On June 17, 1960, the new statue of Our Lady of Lourdes arrived from Italy. The statue was blessed in the Basilica of Sant' Elena in Birkirkara by the provost-archpriest, Mons. Emmauel Vella, on 23 April 1961, and from there she was taken on a pilgrimage to the church of Imsieraħ. The members of the chapter of the Collegiate of Birkirkara and of the community of Capuchin friars took part in the pilgrimage, together with associations and the numerous people of Birkirkara and San Gwann.

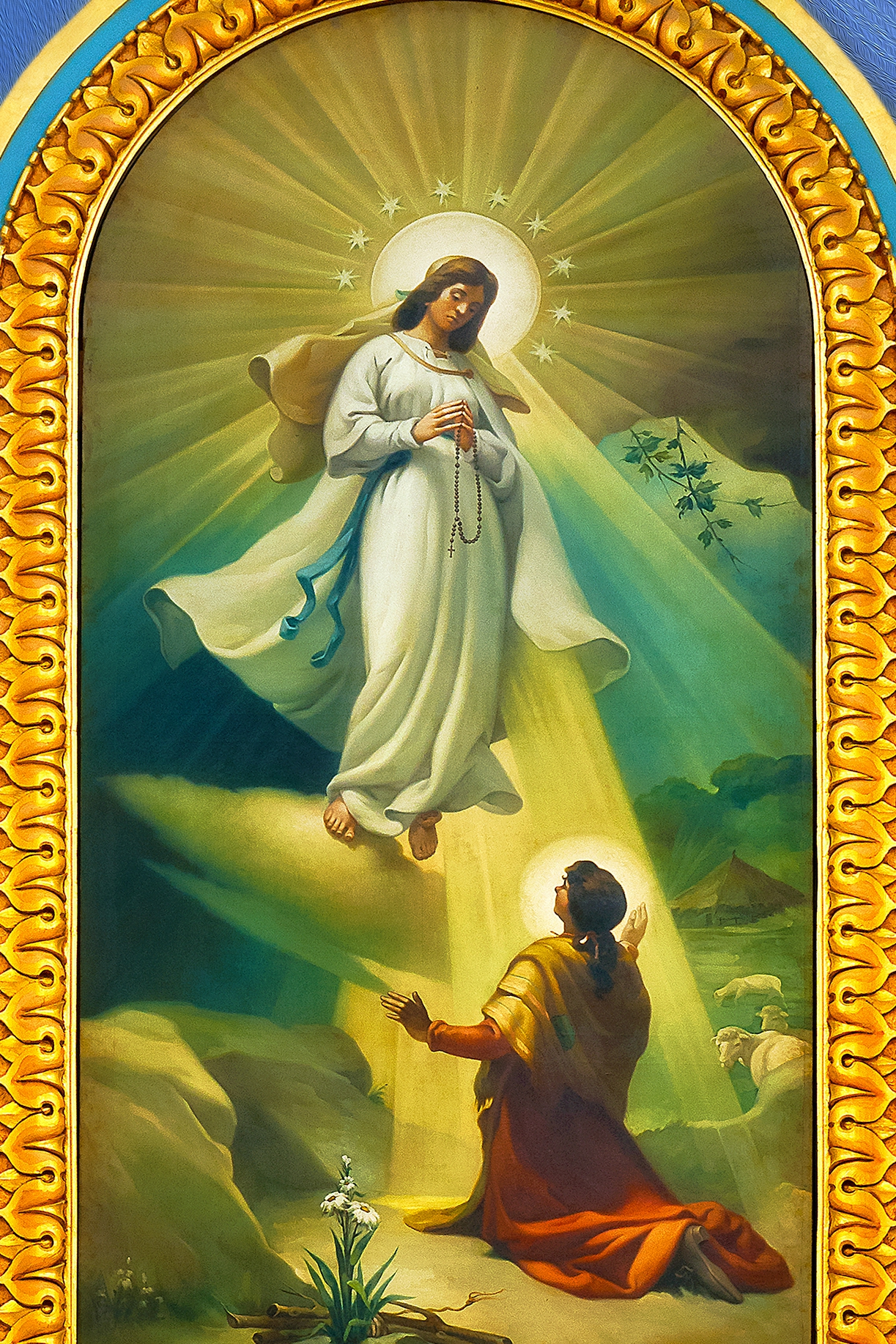
The Titular Painting of Our Lady of Lourdes in San Ġwann.

The titular painting, an exemplary piece by B’Kara artist Ġuzeppi Briffa, was completed in 1959. It depicts a serene scene of the cave where the Madonna of Lourdes appeared, with Our Lady draped in a flowing white gown, while Bernadette gazes upon her. This artwork stands as a testament to Briffa's innovative integration of modern elements into Maltese church art.

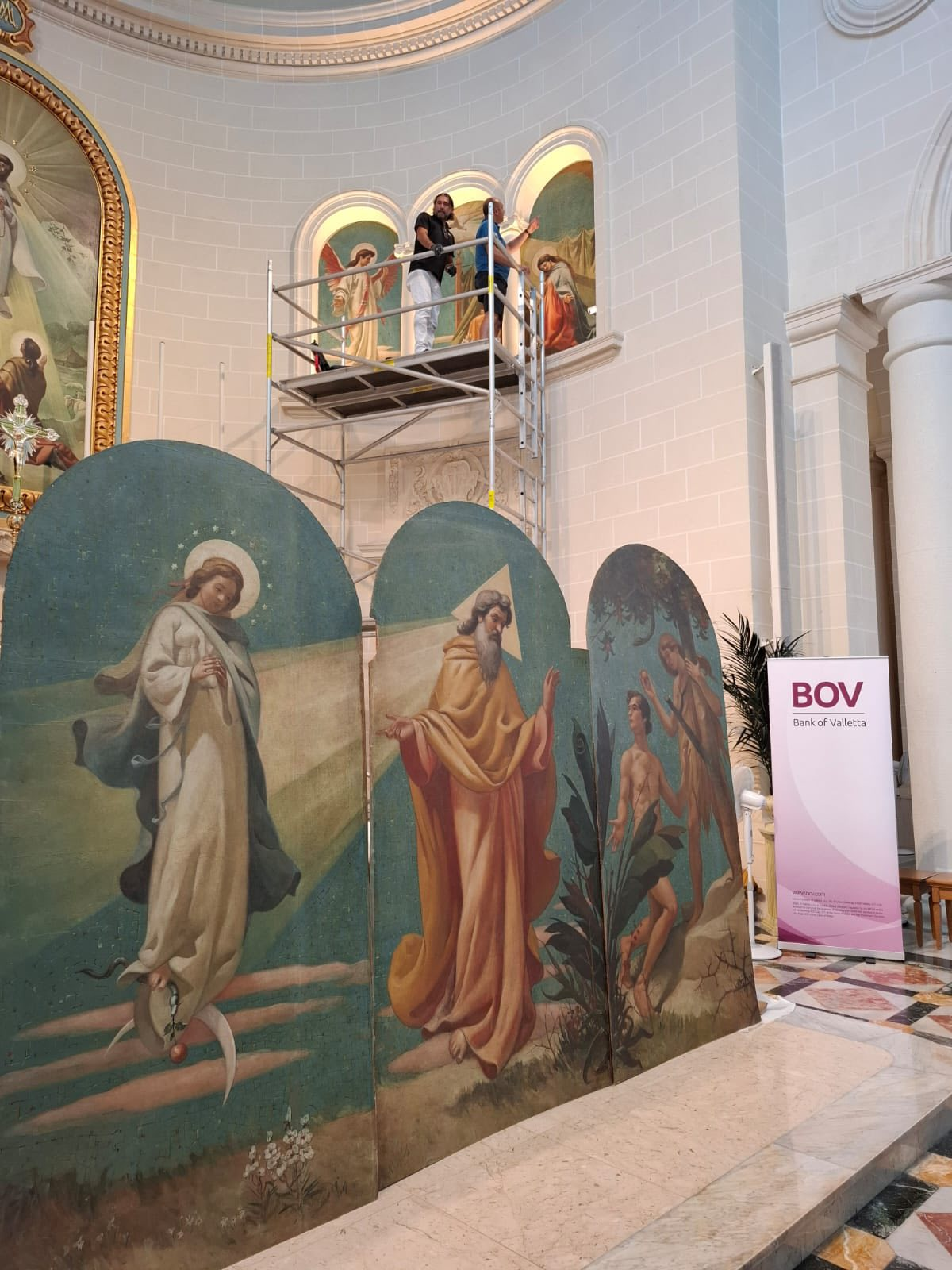
The restored paintings are: The Immaculate Conception in the Context of the Fall of Humanity and The Annunciation of the Archangel Gabriel.

On June 19, 2025, the two paintings (divided into 6 panels) flanking each side of the Titular painting were reinstated in the Parish Church of San Ġwann following their conservation. Their return marked the culmination of a months-long restoration effort undertaken by PrevArti Ltd – Art Conservation & Restoration, and supported by the Bank of Valletta Foundation. The project aimed to stabilise and revitalise Briffa’s works. The conservation process involved pigment consolidation, delicate surface cleaning, removal of discoloured overpaint, and targeted retouching to restore the visual integrity of the compositions.

== Elevation to Parish Church ==
As the number of residents in the locality increased, there was a growing demand for the area to be established as a parish. The church authorities responded positively to this request on September 12, 1965. Mons. Michael Gonzi announced in a pastoral letter that the locality, then known as Imsieraħ and now called San Ġwann, would be designated as a new parish under the patronage of Our Lady of Lourdes. The official inauguration of the parish took place on September 21, 1965, with Friar Leopold Tabone OFM Cap. appointed as the first parish priest.

=== List of parish priests ===
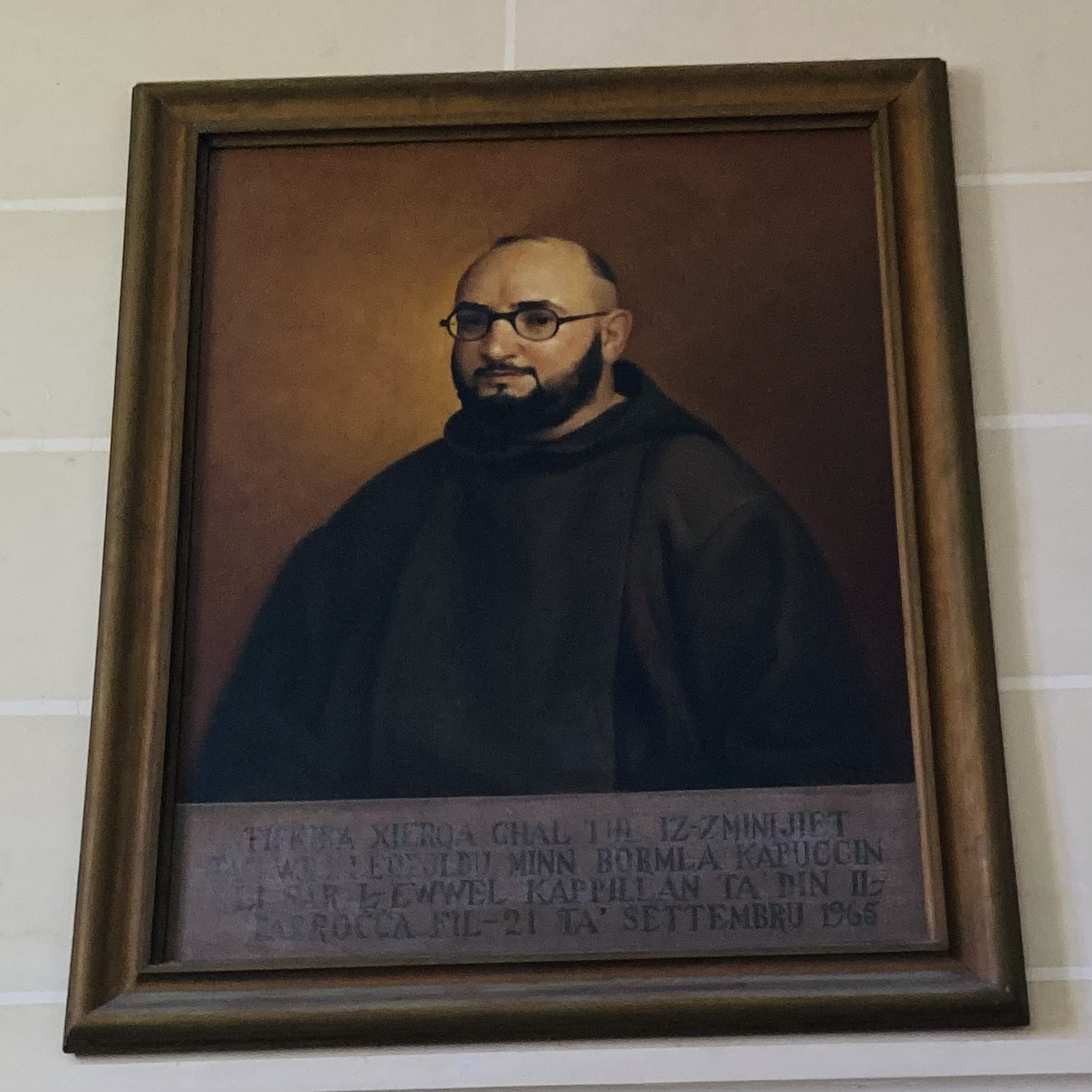
Fr Leopoldu Tabone OFM Cap. - First Parish priest (1965-1983)

- Rev. Leopoldu Tabone OFM Cap. 1965 - 1983
- Rev. Donat Spiteri OFM Cap. 1983 - 1991
- Rev. William Axiaq OFM Cap. 1991 - 1995
- Rev. Joseph Mallia OFM Cap. 1995 - 2004
- Rev. Effie Mallia OFM Cap. 2004 - 2013
- Rev. Emmanuel Abela OFM Cap. 2013 - 2022
- Rev. Bertrand Vella OFM Cap. 2022 -

== Activities ==
The Franciscan Sisters of the Heart of Jesus is a Roman Catholic religious congregation established in 1880 in Rabat, Gozo, Malta, by Fr Joseph Diacono and Virginia Debrincat, who later became known as Sr Margerita of the Heart of Jesus. Adhering to the Rule of the Third Order of St. Francis, the congregation is affiliated with the Minor Franciscans. In 1946, it was granted Pontifical status, allowing it to operate under the authority of the Holy See and expand its mission internationally.

The Neocatechumenal Way was first established in Malta in 1973 at the parish of the Immaculate Conception in Hamrun. In 1976, it was introduced to the parish of San Ġwann with the approval of the parish priest, Fr Leopoldu Tabone OFMCap. Neocatechumenal communities hold two gatherings each week: one midweek for the sharing of the Word, and another on Saturday evening for the Eucharist. Within these communities, catechists are trained to conduct annual catechetical courses for adults with the aim of forming new communities. This practice continues annually, and there are currently seven such communities in San Ġwann. Some catechists from San Ġwann have also established new communities in other parishes across Malta and Gozo.

The Catholic Charismatic Renewal movement began in Malta in May 1975. In the parish of San Ġwann, there are currently two charismatic prayer groups. The initial group was informally established at the Sanctuary of Our Lady of Minsija on May 4, 1986, and quickly evolved into a charismatic group. Following the "Little Mission" held in the parish in October of the same year, two additional prayer groups were formed—one in Kappara and the other in Monte Rosa. These groups eventually united under a single charismatic movement.

The Legion of Mary first arrived in Malta in November 1936 and was officially established in the diocese on April 23, 1940, with the founding of the first Praesidium. In San Ġwann (then known as Imsieraħ), the Legion of Mary was introduced for the first time on June 24, 1958, with the establishment of the first Praesidium named 'Madonna tal-Minsija' (Our Lady of the Oblivion). This Praesidium was founded through the efforts of two legionaries from Birkirkara and was intended for women and girls. Miss M. C. Brincat was the first president, with Kan. Dun V. Ciappara serving as the first spiritual director. Later, on February 2, 1960, a Praesidium for women and senior girls was established through the initiative of Fr Kornelju Bonello.

The first Praesidium of the Legion of Mary for men was established on October 13, 1960, under the name 'Sultana ta' l-Erwieħ' (Queens of Souls). It was under the leadership of its president, Dr Anton Busuttil, and spiritual director Fr Kornelju Bonello. It did not last long. Another Praesidium for Juniors boys was established on June 6, 1968, under the name 'Marija Ommna' (Mary Our Mother) but this also eventually closed.

On October 7, 1977, a new Praesidium for junior boys was re-established under the name 'Marija ta' Nazaret' (Mary of Nazareth). Additionally, on June 20, 1978, a new Praesidium for men was also re-established under the name 'Marija Addolorata' (Sorrowful Mary). Both of these were initiated by Fr Donat Spiteri, who was also their spiritual director.

== Parish centre and chapels ==
Saint Joseph Parish Centre (Ċentru Parrokkjali San Ġużepp), a community-focused centre located in San Ġwann, Malta. Established to support the parish community, the centre offers a variety of services and activities, including religious, educational, and social programs. It serves as a hub for parish events and gatherings, fostering community engagement and support. The centre's facilities are used for various parish functions, including meetings, classes, and community outreach initiatives, contributing to the spiritual and social development of the local community.

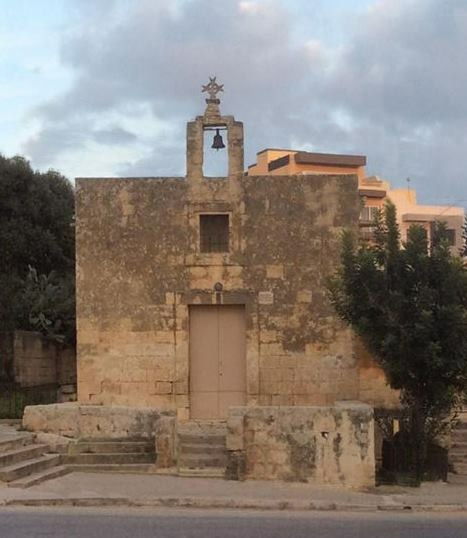
Kappella ta' San Ġwann tal-Għorgħar

The Saint John of the Floods Chapel (Kappella ta' San Ġwann tal-Għorgħar), situated on one of San Ġwann's busiest roads, was originally constructed by a private family in 1546. However, it fell into disuse and was officially abandoned in 1659 by Bishop Balaguer, who declared it no longer a chapel. It was later reopened in 1672.

Architecturally, this late medieval chapel is rectangular with a cubic exterior, typical of Maltese vernacular architecture. It features a modest façade with a small parvis, two stone water spouts on each side, and a small west-facing doorway with a square clerestory window providing the only natural light to the interior. Inside, the chapel has four internal arches supporting a double-pitched roof of stone slabs covered in deffun (traditional Maltese roofing material) and a bell cot above the window, a later addition. Adjacent to the chapel is a small sacristy with a distinctive star-shaped air vent.

The Minsija Sanctuary Church in San Ġwann, Malta, was originally established in a cave used for worship during pirate invasions. This cave evolved into a troglodyte church dedicated to the Annunciation and St. Leonard, the patron saint of pirates. Accessible via a forty-step staircase, the church's name "Minsija," meaning "the forgotten place," is linked to a legend from the 15th century about a hidden image of Our Lady that repeatedly returned to the cave despite attempts to relocate it. This led to the establishment of an altar and the transformation of the site into a pilgrimage destination. The church, with its modest interior featuring two altars and a Via Crucis, underwent significant changes and restorations over the centuries, including a major update in the 1930s by sculptor Luigi Micallef. The large statue of Our Lady of the Annunciation on the church's parvis originally stood in Ħal Balzan parish church. Today, the Mensija Sanctuary remains a vibrant place of devotion, with the Capuchin Fathers conducting services and celebrating the feast of St. Leonard, while the site continues to be adorned with numerous ex-votos.

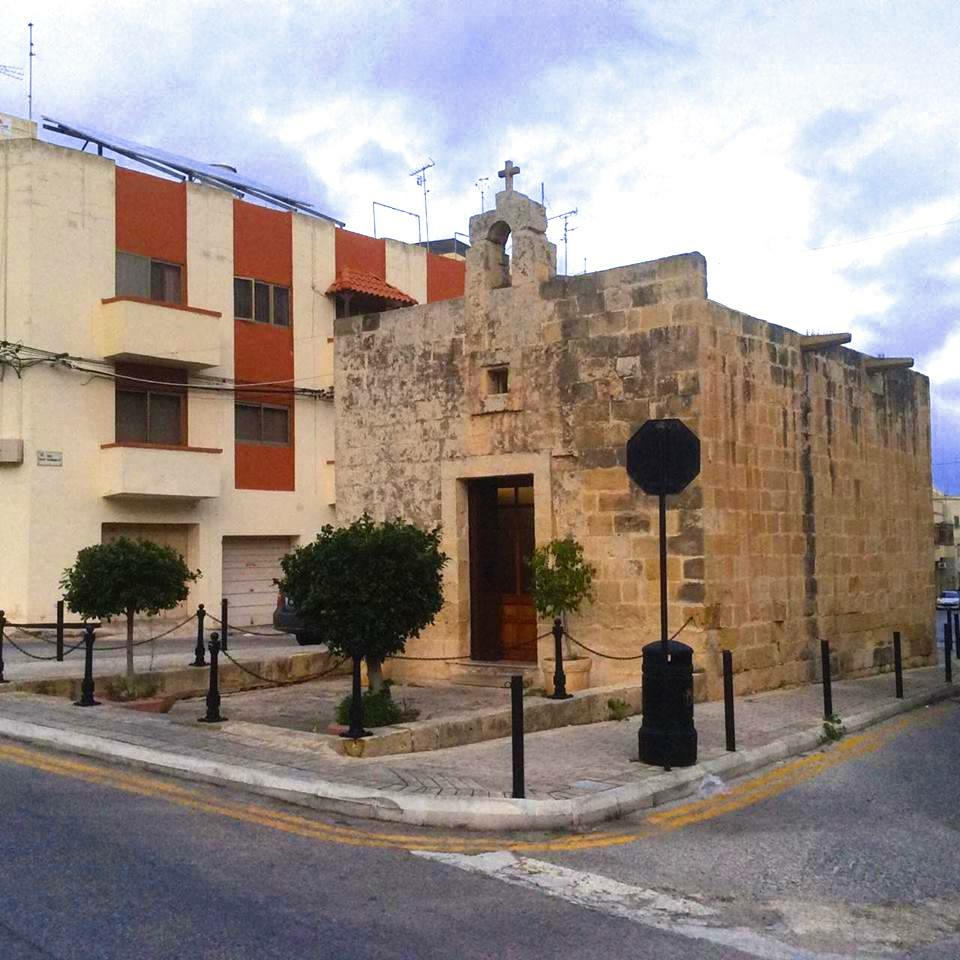
Kappella ta' Santa Margerita

Saint Margaret Chapel (Kappella ta' Santa Margerita), a 16th-century chapel, originally constructed for the farmers working the surrounding fields, holds significant historical value. It has been known with various names during the years such as: Tal-Ħereb, Tal-Imsieraħ, Tal-Arar (Tal-Għarar) u Tal-Bakkar. During World War II, the chapel was severely damaged by a direct hit, which destroyed its ceiling and one of the side walls. Following the war, the damaged parts and the original architecture of the chapel were meticulously restored in 1990.

Saint Philip and Saint James Chapel (Kappella ta’ San Filippu u San Ġakbu), constructed in the early 1730s, was initiated by Fr. Gaspare Giuseppe Vassallo, Provost of the Chapter of Canons of Birkirkara. In a 1732 document, Fr. Vassallo proposed building the chapel on land known as Ta' Wied Għomor to serve local farmers and their families. By the mid-20th century, the chapel was transferred to the Parish of San Ġwann when the Parish was established.

The chapel features a titular painting of Saint Philip and Saint James, attributed to the Maltese painter Gannikol Buhagiar. Locally known as tal-Propostu'(of the Provost) Chapel, it has undergone significant restoration, part of the Local Councils 2022 scheme, aiming to preserve the chapel's historical heritage and reinforce the community's pride in their historical landmarks.
