= San Ġwann =

San Ġwann L-Imsieraħ, Tal-Għorgħar
- Local council
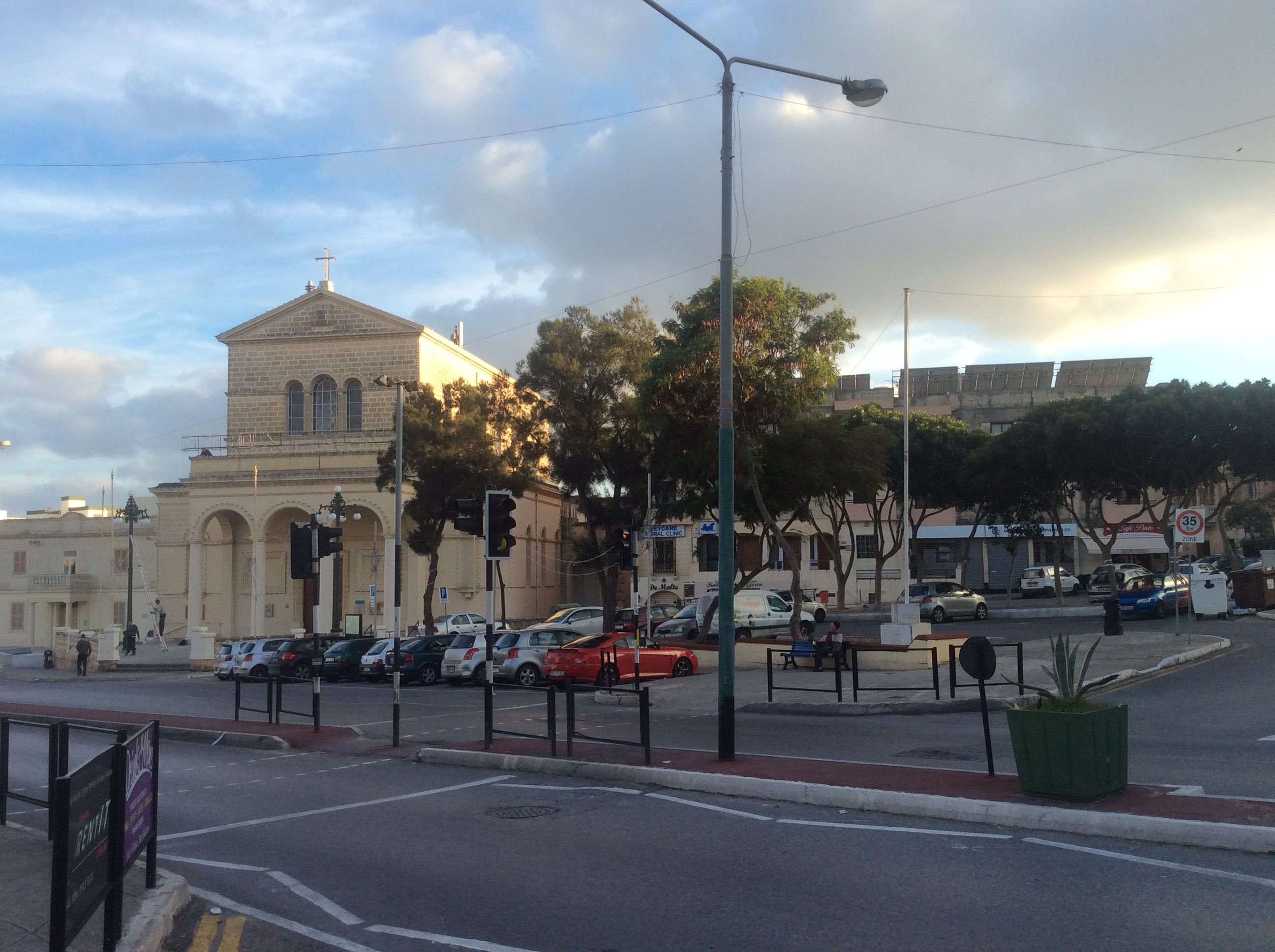
- San Ġwann parish church and square

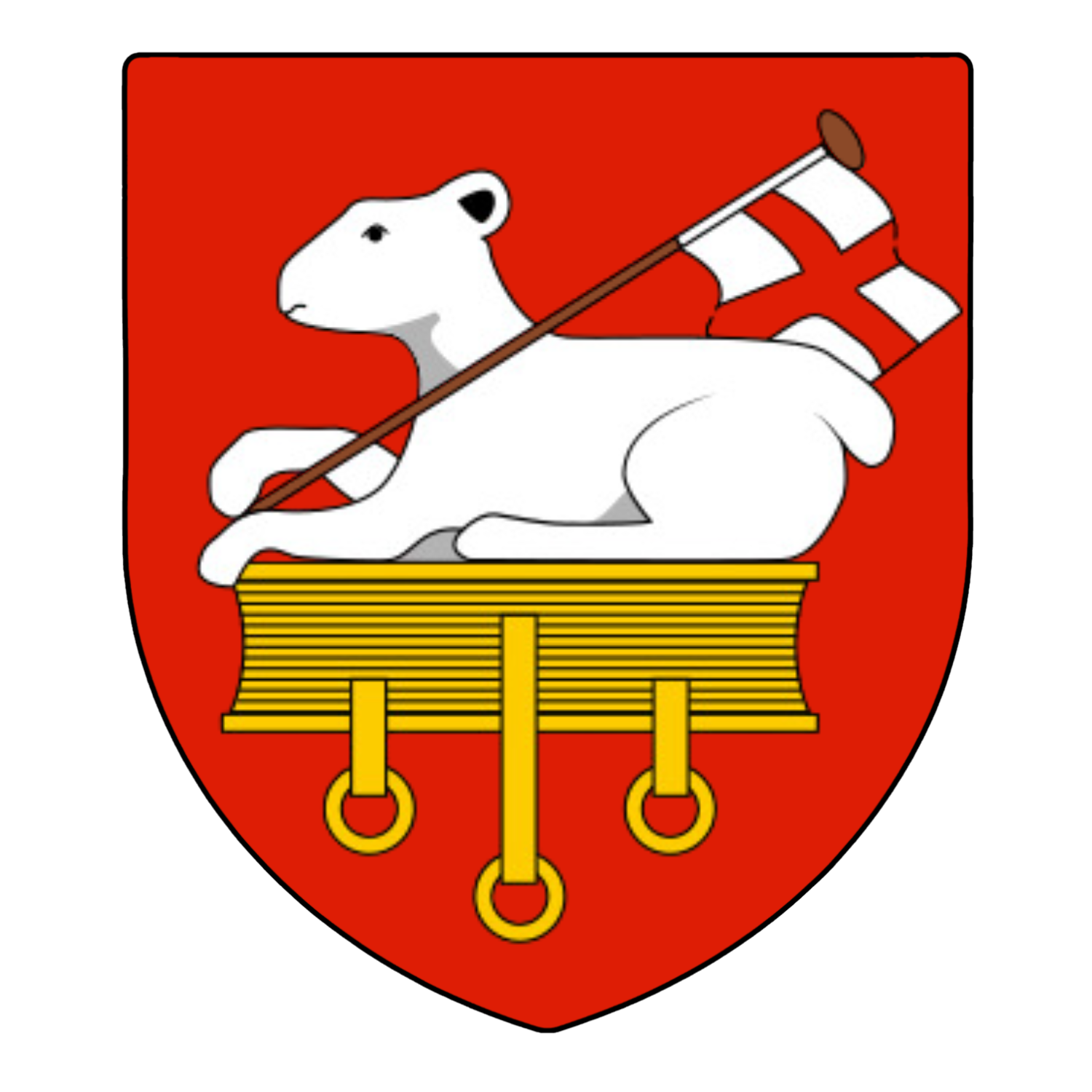
- Flag Coat of arms
- Motto: Ismek tifħirek (Your name is your happiness)
- Coordinates: 35°54′34″N 14°28′43″E
- Country: Malta
- Region: Northern Region
- District: Northern Harbour District
- Borders: Birkirkara, Gżira, Għargħur, Iklin, Msida, Swieqi, San Ġiljan,

Government
  - Mayor: Dominic Cassar (PN)

Area
  - Total: 2.6 km^{2} (1.0 sq mi)

Population (Jul. 2024)
  - Total: 15,882
  - Density: 6,100/km^{2} (16,000/sq mi)
- Demonyms: Ġwanniż (m), Ġwanniża (f), Ġwanniżi (pl)
- Time zone: UTC+1 (CET)
  - Summer (DST): UTC+2 (CEST)
- Postal code: SGN
- Dialing code: 356
- ISO 3166 code: MT-49
- Patron saint: Our Lady of Lourdes
- Day of festa: First Sunday of August
- Website: Official website

San Ġwann (transl. Saint John) is a town in the Northern Region of Malta, with a population of 14,244 as of 2021. Prior to its establishment as a distinct municipality, it was a fragmented community comprising parts of Birkirkara and St. Julian's. San Ġwann emerged as a new parish in 1965 and was officially recognised as a town in 1968. The Local Councils Act of 1993 identified San Ġwann as a separate district with its own statutory local government authority, marking its transition from being part of the neighbouring localities. San Ġwann Council was elected on 16 April 1994.

The population of San Ġwann was 15,882 in July 2024. This included 8,380 males and 7,502 females; 10,903 Maltese nationals and 4,979 foreign nationals.

== Geography ==
San Ġwann is a suburb characterised predominantly by modern buildings, reflecting its contemporary development. However, its geographical context reveals a more ancient history interwoven with Malta's national heritage. The oldest known human traces in San Ġwann are the prehistoric cart ruts near the Sant Andrija area, which likely date back to the period between 2300 and 1000 BC, predating the Punic era.

These cart ruts imply that the region once supported an agricultural community that cultivated the fertile valleys of Wied Għomor, Wied il-Ballut, and Wied Għollieqa. The early inhabitants may have utilized natural caves in the vicinity for shelter. In addition to these cart ruts, megalithic stone blocks found in Wied Għomor suggest the presence of a Neolithic structure.

The area's agricultural significance persisted over the centuries. Roman-era excavations have uncovered tombs and a covered cistern, indicating continued use of the land. The "Roman Tower" of Ta' Ċieda, one of eight such defensive structures erected across Malta around the 3rd century AD, is a notable archaeological feature. During the Arab period, the region was repurposed as a cemetery.

== History ==
San Ġwann's historical tapestry is rich and varied, reflecting its strategic importance and changing dominions over the centuries. The region's Arab heritage is evident in the Semitic names recorded in medieval documents, such as Tal-Għorgħar and L-Imsieraħ. During the medieval era, San Ġwann was inhabited by at least two communities located between Tal-Għorgħar and Naxxar, specifically at Raħal Tigan and Raħal Ger.

The medieval period also saw the establishment of the parochial church of St. Helena in Għorgħar, which was abandoned in the 14th century and was likely situated near the Ta' Ċieda Tower. The cave-chapel of San Leonardo, now known as the Chapel of the Annunciation (Lunziata Chapel), is another historical site.

The arrival of the Order of St. John in 1530 and the subsequent Great Siege of 1565 marked a period of relative safety from Turkish raids, leading to increased population and construction. The era saw the erection of chapels and other structures, including Torri ta' Lanzun, a protected farm-building dating around 1713.

During the late 18th century, specifically between 1798 and 1800, the Għorgħar area played a crucial role as an outpost for Maltese troops blockading French forces within the capital. The Ta' Xindi Farmhouse served as the headquarters for Captain Vincenzo Borg (Brared).

In the 20th century, the area experienced minimal impact from World War II, although Torri Lanzun was damaged during enemy action. Post-war developments included strategic planning by the British Colonial Office, which initiated the construction of underground flour mills in Malta and Gozo, with one such mill, including a silo, situated behind the San Ġwann State Primary School.

The 1950s brought further development with the construction of a convent by the Capuchin Friars and a new church, which was completed in December 1959 and became the Parish Church in 1965. This church adopted its name from the old chapel of San Ġwann tal-Għorghar.

San Ġwann's population saw significant growth in the 1970s, reaching 12,630 by 2005 and with a population of 14,244 as of 2021.

== Local council ==
The Local Councils Act of 1993 recognised San Ġwann as a separate district with its own local government authority, and the first San Ġwann Council was elected on 16 April 1994.

=== Previous Legislations ===
==== First Legislation: 1994–1997 ====
- Mayor: Antoine Cesareo (Mayor 1994-1996), Tony C. Cutajar (Mayor 1997)
- Deputy Mayor: Paula Fleri Soler
- Councillors: Emanuel k/a Wally Farrugia, Tony C. Cutajar, Charles Burlo, Violet Bajada, Victor Xuereb, Anthony Mifsud, Ronald Burgess
- Executive Secretary: George Bonello

==== Second Legislation: 1997–2000 ====
- Mayor: Helen Fenech
- Deputy Mayor: Louis Borg
- Councillors: Etienne Bonello DuPuis, Tony C. Cutajar, Antoine Cesareo, Victor Xuereb, Violet Bajada, Helen Fenech, Joseph Mary Gauci, Ronald Burgess
- Executive Secretary: Marisa Pisani

==== Third Legislation: 2000–2003 ====
- Mayor: Helen Fenech (PN)
- Deputy Mayor: Tony C. Cutajar (PN)
- Councillors: Julian Spiteri (PN), Rene` Savona Ventura (PL), Victor Xuereb (PL), Kurt Guillaumier (PN), Emanuel k/a Wally Farrugia (PL), Violet Bajada (PL), Etienne Bonello DuPuis (PN)
- Executive Secretary: Marisa Pisani

==== Fourth Legislation: 2003–2006 ====
- Mayor: Kurt Guillaumier (PN)
- Deputy Mayor: Etienne Bonello DuPuis (PN)
- Councillors: Emanuel k/a Wally Farrugia (PL), Marica Bayliss (PN), Joseph Borg (PL), Dominic Cassar (PN), Anthony Mifsud Bonnici (PL), Victor Xuereb (PL), George k/a Neville Mallia (PN)
- Executive Secretary: Josef Grech

==== Fifth Legislation: 2006–2009 ====
- Mayor: Joseph Bog (Mayor 2006 – 2008, resigned 2008) (PL), Rene` Savona Ventura (2008) (PL)
- Deputy Mayor: Rene` Savona Ventura (2006-2008) (PL), Keith Grima (2008) (PL)
- Councillors: George k/a Neville Mallia (PN), Marica Bayliss (PN), Simon Saliba (PN), Violet Bajada (PL), Etienne Bonello DuPuis (PN), Kurt Guillaumier (PN), Malcom Dimech (Casual Election 2008) (PL)
- Executive Secretary: Josef Grech

==== Sixth Legislation: 2009–2013 ====
- Mayor: Joseph Agius (PN)
- Deputy Mayor: Etienne Bonello DuPuis (PN)
- Councillors: Anthony Mifsud Bonnici (PL), Rita Saliba (PL), Violet Bajada (PL), Joan Farrugia (PL), Marica Bayliss (PN), George k/a Neville Mallia (PN), David Dalli (PN)
- Executive Secretary: Adrian Mifsud

==== Seventh Legislation: 2013–2019 ====
- Mayor: Etienne Bonello DuPuis (PN)
- Deputy Mayor: Marica Bayliss (PN)
- Councillors: Mikhail Micallef (PN), Joan Farrugia (PL), Malcolm Abdilla (PL), Rita Saliba (PL), Dominic Cassar (PN), Trevor Fenech (PL), Neville Mallia (PN)
- Executive Secretary: Kurt Guillaumier

==== Eighth Legislation: 2019–2024 ====
- Mayor: Trevor Fenech (PL)
- Deputy Mayor: Anthony Mifsud Giordani (PL)
- Councillors: David Dalli (PN), Joan Farrugia (PL), Tania Borg (PL), Joe Aquilina (PN), Dominic Cassar (PN), Violet Bajada (PL), Etienne Bonello DuPuis (PN)
- Executive Secretary: Kurt Guillaumier

=== Current Legislation ===
==== Ninth Legislation: 2024– ====
- Mayor: Dominic Cassar (PN)
- Deputy Mayor: Pauline Vella Critien (PN)
- Councillors: Trevor Fenech (PL), Javier Caruana (PL), Norbert Dalli (PN), Joan Farrugia (PL), Anthony Mifsud Bonnici (PL), Noel Dimech (PN), Claire Calleja Zammit (PL), Carmelo Pace Taliana (PN), Salvu Debono (PN)
- Executive Secretary: Kurt Guillaumier

== Inauguration of a new anthem ==
At the initiative of the parish priest, Fr Bertrand Vella, the newly composed hymn Innu San Ġwann (Imsieraħ) was introduced and performed for the first time on Saturday, 28 September 2024, at the Parish Church of Our Lady Mary of Lourdes, San Ġwann. This event marked a significant milestone for the community, serving as a profound expression of the locality's cultural and spiritual identity.

The hymn's lyrics were authored by Fr Mario Attard OFM Cap, a native of San Ġwann, while the musical composition was crafted by Mro Raymond Storace, the Choir Master of the local Parish Church. Their collaboration resulted in a piece that embodies the essence and heritage of the locality.

The inaugural performance was graced by the presence of the Mayor and Councilors of San Ġwann, together with parishioners and residents, who came together to celebrate this moment of unity. The hymn was performed by the Our Lady of Lourdes - San Ġwann Parish Choir, under the direction of Mro Raymond Storace, filling the church with a deep sense of reverence and joy.

Official Maltese Lyrics:	English Translation:
Raħal bi storja qadima Li tmur lura fi żminijiet, Kemm fis-skiet seħħlek li torbot Ġnus u popli taħt is-smewwiet. L-arja friska li sawritek Tant siġar żejnuk lejl u nhar, Sbuħitek ħilet id-dgħajjef Ħlewwitek tħeġġeġ daqs in-nar. Ritornell: Int Imsieraħ ilkoll insejħulek Mimlija bl-imħabba fil-qlub, Int għallimtna ngħixu t'aħwa Għalhekk lilek qlubna jħobbuk. Taħt il-ħarsien ta' Ommna Marija Nitgħallmu ngħixu ta' wlied, Ta' Alla li hu Missierna U bit-talb ta' Ġwanni l-Għammied. Għajnuna, rispett u mħabba F'qalbek jinstabu fil-milja, O raħal tagħna ibnina Fl-isbaħ u fl-aqwa familja. Imsieraħ ħannieqa mżewqa B'kulturi w reliġjonijiet, Agħllimna ngħixu lkoll bejnietna Fis-sliem qalb kotra ta' fehmiet. Ritornell: Int Imsieraħ ilkoll insejħulek Mimlija bl-imħabba fil-qlub, Int għallimtna ngħixu t'aħwa Għalhekk lilek qlubna jħobbuk. Taħt il-ħarsien ta' Ommna Marija Nitgħallmu ngħixu ta' wlied, Ta' Alla li hu Missierna U bit-talb ta' Ġwanni l-Għammied.	A village with a history so old Going back to past times, Silently it managed to connect Nations, peoples under the heavens. The air so fresh, shaped you The trees adorned you day and night, Your beauty comforted the weak And your sweetness a kindling flame. Chorus: Imsieraħ, we do call you Love abounding from our hearts, As you taught us to live as kin The reason why our hearts love you. Under the protection of Mother Mary As children, we learn to live, Of God, who is our Father And prayers of John the Baptist. Help, respect, and love In abundance fill your heart, Build us, O village of ours Into the most beautiful, united family. Imsieraħ, an embracing haven With cultures and religions adorned, Teach us to live amongst each other In peace amidst different opinions. Chorus: Imsieraħ, we do call you Love abounding from our hearts, As you taught us to live as kin The reason why our hearts love you. Under the protection of Mother Mary As children, we learn to live, Of God, who is our Father And prayers of John the Baptist.

== National monuments ==
=== Tal-Mensija Cart Ruts ===
These Cart Ruts are prehistoric marks carved into natural rock formations. They are believed to date back to the Bronze Age and provide evidence of early transportation and agricultural practices in the area.

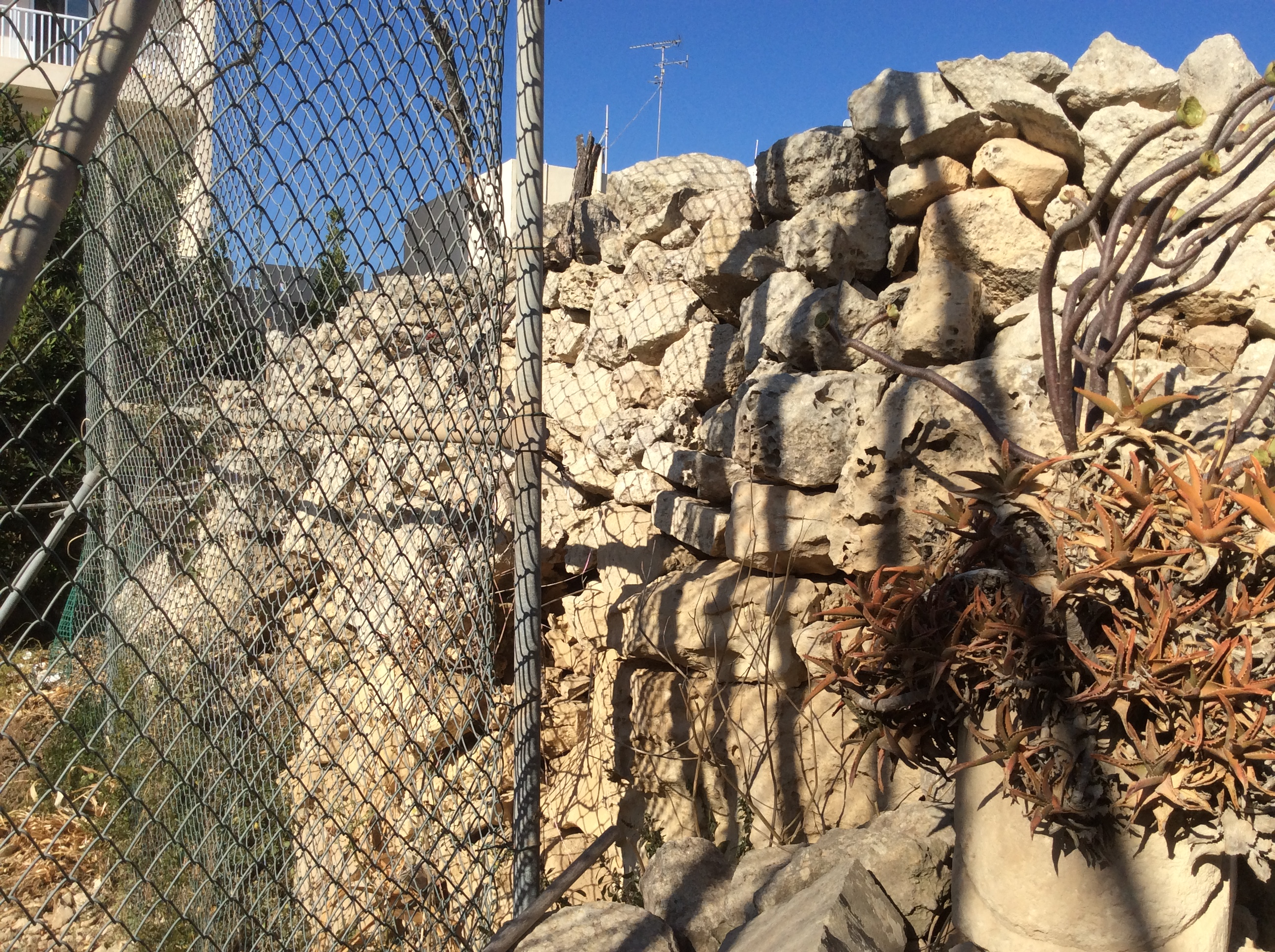
Torri ta' Ċieda

=== Torri ta' Ċieda (Ta' Ċieda Roman Tower) ===
The Punic-Roman tower in San Ġwann, Malta, is a historical structure whose origins are shrouded in mystery. While the exact date of its construction is uncertain, it is suggested that the tower may have predated Roman times and could potentially have Punic origins, with later Roman adaptations. During the medieval period, under the Muslim Caliphate, the site was used as a cemetery. After the Muslims' expulsion from Malta, a church dedicated to St. Helen was constructed on the site.

Today, approximately one-third of the tower remains, though it is in a neglected state. The tower is part of a network of defensive structures built to protect against sea invasions. Eight coastal towers are believed to have existed in Malta and none on the nearby island of Gozo, with six identified as Punic-Roman tower. Nearby, the remains of a rural villa, including a cistern and Roman wall, can also be found.

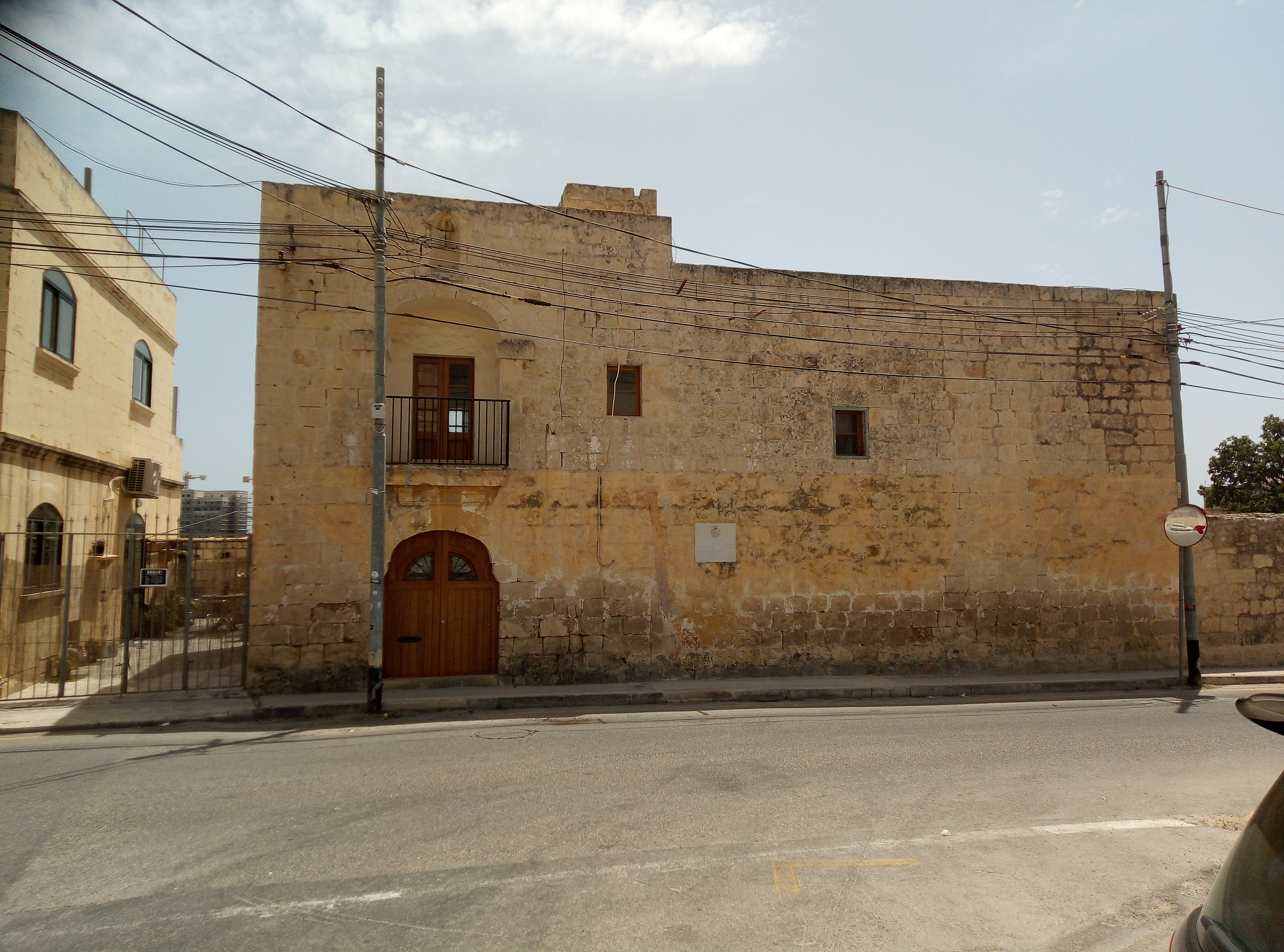
Ir-Razzett ta' Xindi

=== Ir-Razzett ta' Xindi (Ta' Xindi Farmhouse) ===
An 18th-century farmhouse in San Ġwann, Malta, originally built during the Order of St. John, has undergone various adaptations over the centuries. Constructed as a farmhouse, it served this purpose for approximately two hundred years in the suburb of Kappara. During the brief French occupation of Malta, the building gained historical significance when it was used as the headquarters for the Maltese resistance, known as the Għorghar Rise, led by its owner, Vincenzo Borg. A commemorative plaque installed on the façade during the British period honours Borg's role in the revolt.

The farmhouse came into national prominence when it was mentioned by Prime Minister Lawrence Gonzi, in the Maltese Parliament, leading to its scheduling as a protected site by the Malta Environment and Planning Authority. Today, the building, which is privately owned, has been refurbished and is used as a residential home. It is recognised as a national cultural monument, reflecting its historical and cultural significance.

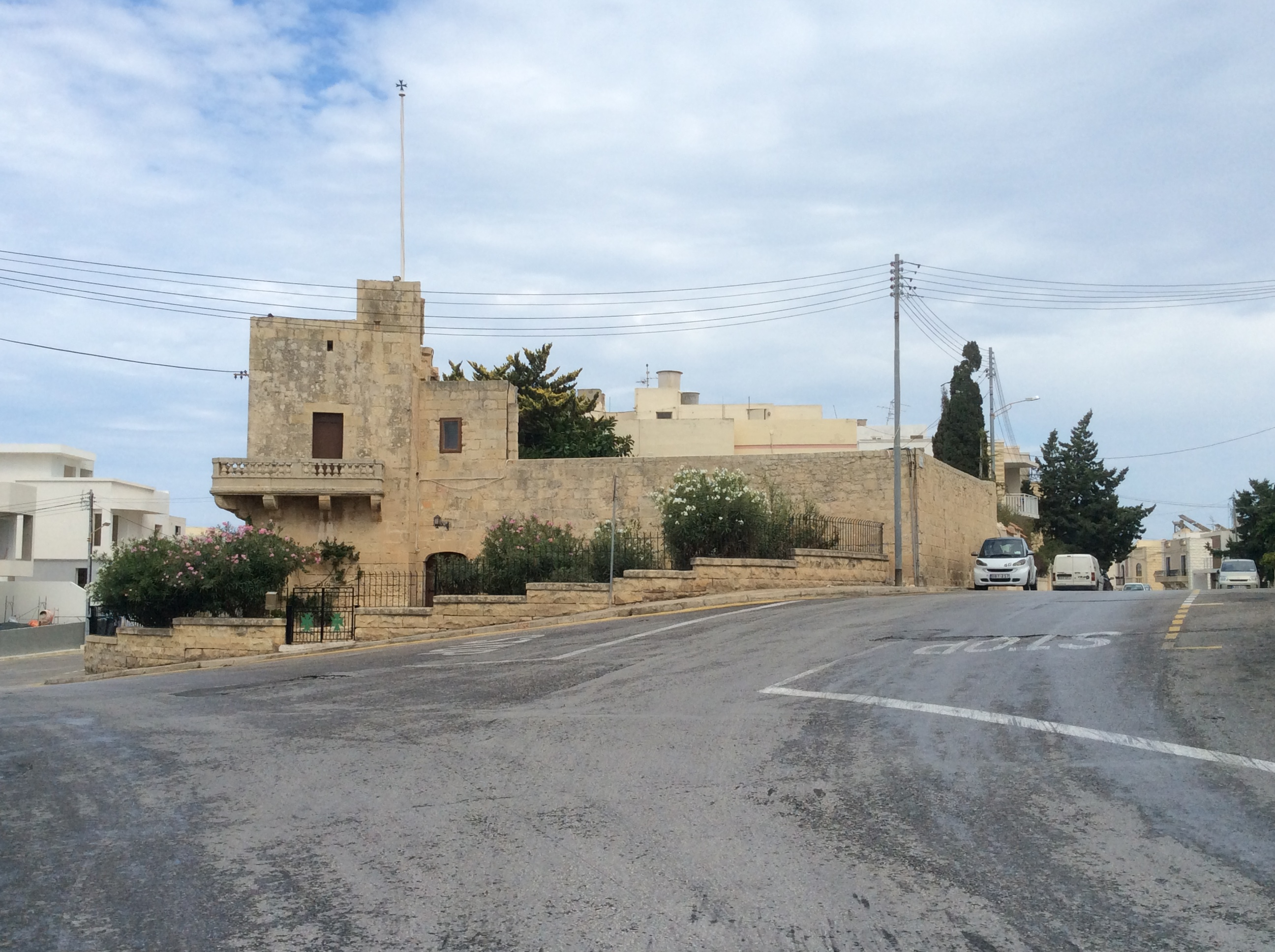
Castello Lanzun

=== Castello Lanzun (Lanzun Tower) ===
The distinguished example of traditional Maltese vernacular architecture and an important medieval building dating back to the 15th century. Originally built as a farmhouse, it is linked to the legend of the Mensija cave-church. The residence, also known as "it-Torri ta' Lanzun" or "Castle of the Lance," acquired its name from Vincenzo 'Wenzu' Lanzun, a wealthy merchant from Birgu who purchased and fortified the property in the 17th century. Lanzun used the farmhouse to quarantine himself and his surviving son during the devastating plague epidemic of 1676, which claimed the lives of his wife and three children.

Located on the edge of the Mensija area in San Ġwann, Malta, Castello Lanzun stands on Triq is-Santwarju, across from the Mensija sanctuary cave-chapel. Its elevated position offers panoramic views of St. George's Bay, St. Julian's Bay, Spinola Bay, and Valletta, making it ideal for monitoring approaching threats. Fortified in 1713 by Lanzun to defend against pirate raids, it later served as a hunting lodge for the Grand Master of the Order of St. John and, during World War II, as an observation post. Today, the building, which was restored in the 1970s, includes a small, active chapel and continues to be the headquarters for the Malta-Paris obedience of the Military and Hospitaller Order of Saint Lazarus of Jerusalem.

=== Rural Structure with WWII Observation Post ===
The World War II observation post on Emvin Cremona Street in San Ġwann has sparked controversy due to its integration into a new apartment complex. Initially constructed by the Royal Engineers, this bomb-proof structure, characterised by its ashlar masonry walls and vernacular roof, was a crucial part of Malta's wartime defense system. Heritage Malta has highlighted it as an integral element of the island's historical fortifications.

Recent developments have led to public outcry as the observation post has been overshadowed by the new building, which many residents and history enthusiasts feel diminishes the site's historical value. Concerns about the structure's preservation emerged in 2016 when it was discovered that developers had omitted it from their initial plans. The Superintendence of Cultural Heritage intervened, ensuring that the historical site was acknowledged in the revised project plans.

=== Underground Flour Mill ===
In the 1950s, as Malta was recovering from the devastation of World War II and facing the uncertainties of the Cold War, the British colonial administration initiated a significant civil defense project to ensure a stable food supply in the event of a nuclear attack. As part of this effort, a network of eight underground flour mills was constructed between 1954 and 1955. These mills were strategically located across Malta and Gozo to ensure accessibility while being hidden from potential aerial attacks. In San Ġwann, one of these underground flour mills was built to provide a secure and self-sufficient supply of flour. These underground mills were designed to be fully operational independently, with each facility equipped with its own power generation capabilities. However, the anticipated threat of nuclear conflict never materialised, leading to the abandonment of most of these mills.

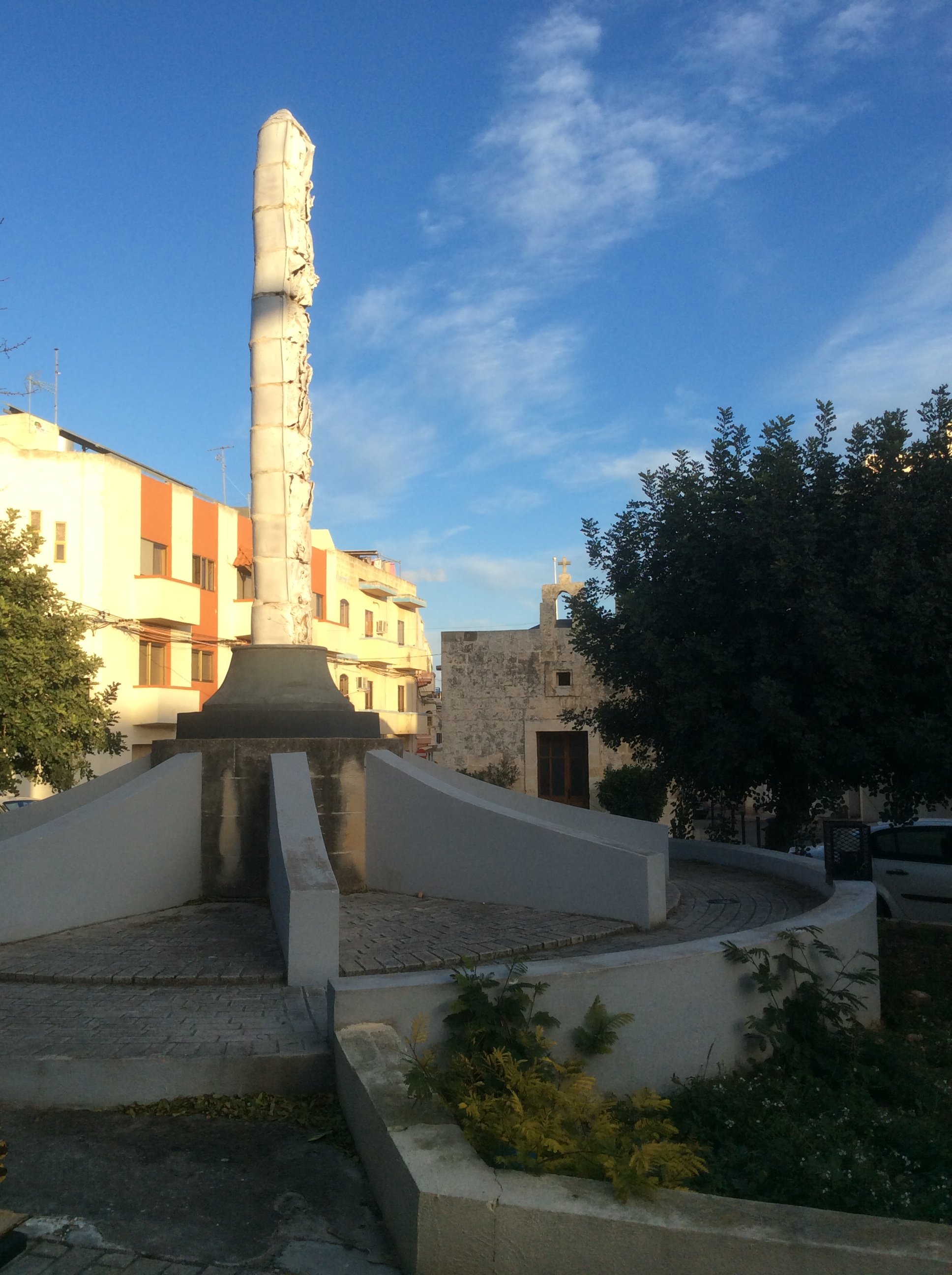
Eternal Column by Paul Vella Critien

=== Kolonna Eterna (Eternal Column by Paul Vella Critien) ===
Also known as the Millennium Monument, is a striking 21st-century column located in San Ġwann, Malta. Designed by Maltese artist Paul Vella Critien, who honed his craft in Italy and Australia, the column stands as a commemoration of the third millennium. Inaugurated in 2003 by Prime Minister Eddie Fenech Adami, the monument was part of a local initiative by the San Ġwann Local Council.

The column, situated in front of the Santa Margerita Chapel, gained national attention due to its abstract design, which some commentators have noted resembles a phallic symbol. Despite this, it remains a prominent feature of the local landscape and a testament to the millennium celebrations.

== Squares, gardens and other notable places ==
=== Gardens ===
==== Ġnien Karin Grech (Karin Grech Garden) ====
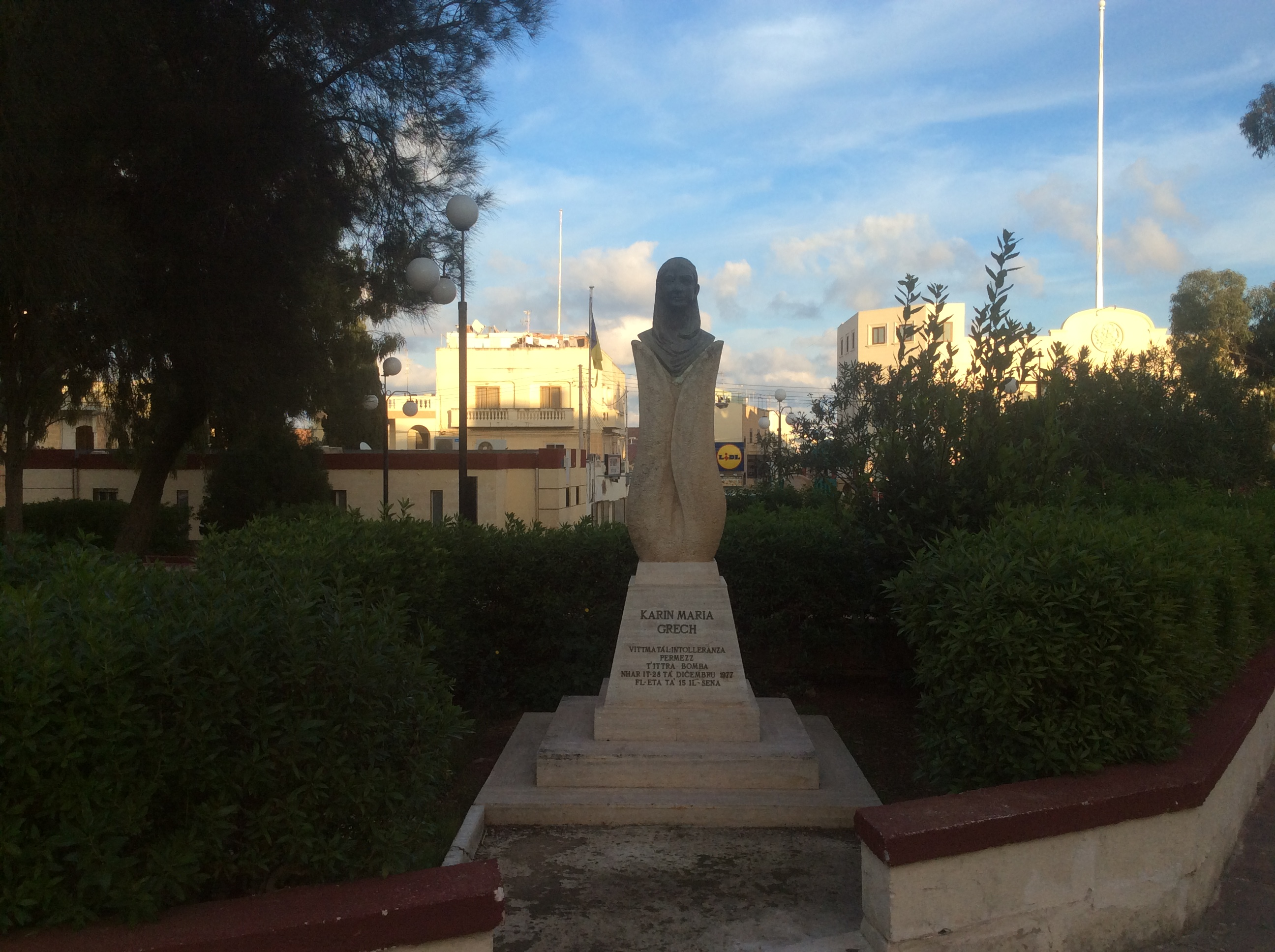
Karin Grech Garden

Karin Grech Garden is also known as Karin Grech Playing Field, located on Vjal ir-Riħan in San Ġwann, Malta, is dedicated to Karin Grech, a victim of a letter bomb attack. Prior to its transformation into a public garden in 1981, the site was characterized by natural vegetation and served as agricultural land from Roman times until the mid-20th century. The establishment of the garden responded to a growing demand for recreational spaces due to San Ġwann's expanding population. It was the first urban public garden in the locality, providing essential green space, and remains a cherished area for the community despite the development of additional gardens in San Ġwann.

The present design of the garden is a modest design. The playing field was last refurbished by the San Ġwann Local Council who took care to adapt it with contextual modernisation.

==== Ġnien id-Dakkara (Pollinator Garden) ====
A previously neglected 1,000-square-metre area on the outskirts of San Ġwann has been rejuvenated into a vibrant public garden dedicated to the crucial role of pollination and the Maltese honeybee. This transformation, known as Pollinator Garden, was spearheaded by the San Ġwann council and Project Green. Situated off Tal-Balal road, the garden is conveniently located within a short walk from the homes of approximately 570 families in the area.

It features a variety of high-pollen trees and shrubs designed to attract and support bee populations. Notable plantings include 92 trees and 276 shrubs, such as cypress, carob, chaste, fan palms, oak, and jacaranda trees, as well as aromatic herbs that enhance pollination. The garden also boasts honeybee enclosures, creating a sanctuary for bees and offering visitors an educational experience about the importance of the Maltese honeybee.

The garden's design includes a hexagonal layout, with wooden platforms forming an organic and accessible pathway. Visitors can enjoy benches and other outdoor furniture amidst the greenery. This new space not only fosters local biodiversity by supporting pollinators but also serves as a tool for environmental education.

==== Ġnien George Zarb (George Zarb Garden) ====
Triq il-Kampanella

==== Ġnien iż-Żebbuġ (Olive Trees Garden) ====
Triq l-Istefenotis

==== Ġnien Ġużeppe Marija Camilleri (Ġużeppe Marija Camilleri Garden) ====
Triq Ic-Ciefa, San Ġwann

==== Ġnien San Ġorġ Preca (Saint George Preca Garden) ====
Triq San Ġiljan

=== Squares ===
==== Misraħ Awrikarja ====
Vjal In-Naspli

==== Pjazza Vincenzo Borg Brared ====
Triq Il-Qalbiena

==== Misraħ Lewza ====
Triq Feliċ Borġ

==== Misraħ il-Ward ====
Triq il-Qronfol

==== Pjazza Patri Donat Spiteri ====
Triq il-Plejju

==== Misraħ Santa Margerita ====
Triq il-Kappella

=== Valleys ===
==== Għollieqa Valley ====
Wied Għollieqa is a small valley located in the northeast of Malta, adjacent to the University of Malta. Saved from urban development in the 1980s by local environmental NGOs, residents, and students, the valley underwent an afforestation program initiated by Nature Trust Malta to restore its natural state. Today, it is a protected area, notable for housing the largest population of the endangered Sandarac Gum Tree ('Siġra tal-Għargħar' – Tetraclinis articulata), along with a variety of other trees.

The valley provides crucial refuge and nesting grounds for birds such as the Sardinian Warbler ('Bufula Sewda' – Sylvia melanocephala), Cetti's Warbler ('Bufula tal-Għollieqa' – Cettia cetti), and the Common Swift ('Rundun' – Apus apus), as well as mammals like the rare Least Weasel ('Ballottra' – Mustela nivalis). Archaeological discoveries in the valley include Bronze Age pottery, a tomb from 50 AD with cremation urns and skeletal remains, a tower, a cistern, and cart ruts.

Designated as a bird sanctuary, a Level 2 Area of Ecological Importance (AEI), a Level 1 Site of Scientific Importance, a Tree Protection Area, and a Special Area of Conservation (SAC), the site is managed by Nature Trust Malta with funding from the Environment and Resources Authority (ERA) and a restoration plan by ecologist Dr. Eman Calleja. Access is restricted to three entrances: from the University area (via car park 1, the Mediterranean Institute, and the ring road opposite the engineering department), an open gateway from Kappara, or the emergency route from Vjal Mikiel Anton Vassalli.

== Educational Buildings ==
=== St Clare College - San Ġwann Primary School ===
San Ġwann Primary School introduced its new kindergarten block in late 2015, following a renovation and construction project that began in August 2014. This addition includes approximately nineteen classrooms and offers a variety of daily activities for young learners. The school has since welcomed around six hundred students and experienced an increase in foreign enrolments. It has been awarded the Green Flag for environmental excellence for seven consecutive years and collaborates with Eko Skola and the LEAF committee. The school provides tablets to Year 4 through Year 6 students as part of a pilot project and features a multi-sensory learning center for autistic pupils.

Before the academic year starts in late September or early October, the school holds a meeting in the hall with the head of school and staff, followed by individual classroom meetings with parents, pupils, and teachers. The school year runs from late September to June, with half-days from 8:15 AM to 12:00 PM. Special activities include sports events for Father's Day, a Mother's Day lunch, the San Ġwann spring village, a prom night for Year 6 students, and a Sports Career Development Program for Year 6 pupils.

=== Chiswick House School ===
An independent institution that provides a holistic learning experience for children from 2 years and 1 month to 5 years old. The school operates three distinct programs: Bumble Bees for children aged 2 years and 1 month to 3 years, Early Years 1 for those from 3 to 4 years, and Early Years 2 for 4 to 5-year-olds. These programs focus on personal, social, and emotional development, problem-solving, reasoning and numeracy, communication, language and literacy, creativity, and knowledge of the living and physical world, while also fostering physical development.

School hours are from 9:00 AM to 1:00 PM, with doors opening at 8:50 AM and reopening at 12:45 PM.

=== St. Francis School ===
A Church-affiliated institution with admission granted through a ballot system. Located within the Convent of the Franciscan nuns in the village square, the school is small and inviting, with a separate entrance distinct from the convent. Catering exclusively to Kinder 1 and Kinder 2 students aged 3 to 5 years, the school provides early education before students transition to St. Francis Primary School in Birkirkara upon completing their kindergarten years.

== Parish Church, Chapels and Convents ==
=== Parish Church ===
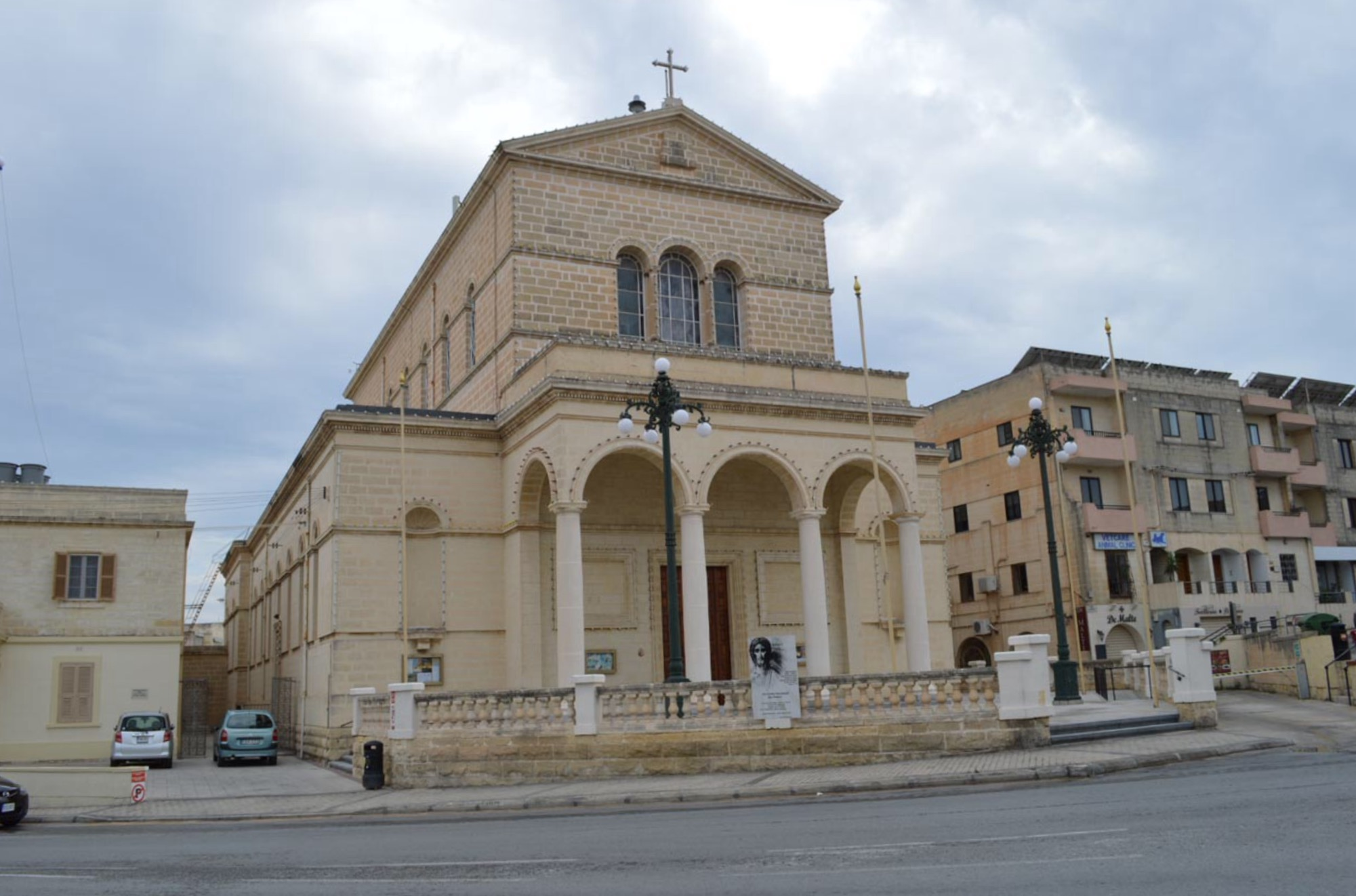
Knisja Parrokkjali Madonna ta' Lourdes

==== Knisja Parrokkjali ta' Sidtna Marija ta' Lourdes (Our Lady of Lourdes Parish Church) ====
Following World War II, as the area between Birkirkara and Sliema began to develop, Archbishop Mons. Mikiel Gonzi requested the Capuchin friars to address the spiritual needs of the expanding community. On 21 February 1947, the Capuchins took charge of the locality of Imsierah, with the initial friars being Fr. Felic Scicluna, Fr. Joseph Mary Spiteri, and Fr. Teophilus Ebejer. They initially resided at 152, Triq San Ġiljan, near the Chapel of San Ġwann ta' l-Għarghar. Construction began on 3 November 1949, for a new church dedicated to Our Lady of Lourdes. The church was completed and inaugurated on 20 December 1959, and consecrated on 12 May 1962, by the Archbishop. Due to the growing population, the locality was officially elevated to a parish on 12 September 1965, with Mons. Michael Gonzi announcing the new parish dedicated to Our Lady of Lourdes. The parish was inaugurated on 21 September 1965, with Fr. Leopold Tabone OFM Cap. as the first parish priest.

=== Convents and Parish Centre ===
==== Kunvent tal-Aħwa Minuri Kapuċċini (Convent of the Minor Capuchin Brothers) ====
Alongside the church, work began on constructing a convent dedicated to the Capuchin friars. The land for this project was generously donated by Joseph Borg and his son Felic. By 15 September 1950, the ground floor of the convent was completed and served as a temporary chapel where the Blessed Sacrament was solemnly transferred from the Chapel of San Ġwann ta' l-Għarghar. The convent, which supports the spiritual and community work of the parish, has been a vital part of the religious life in San Ġwann. The current Capuchin fraternity includes Fr. Bertrand Vella (Parish Priest), Fr. Paul Bugeja, Fr. Valentine Calleja, Fr. John Vella, Br. Jesmond Ciantar, Fr. Leonard Falzon, and Fr. Publius Mair.

==== Kunvent tas-Sorijiet Franġiskani tal-Qalb ta' Ġesú (Convent of the Franciscan Sisters of the Heart of Jesus) ====
Founded in 1880 in Rabat, Gozo, by Dun Ġużepp Diacono and Virginia Debrincat, who later became known as Suor Margerita tal-Qalb ta' Ġesù. The congregation follows the Rule of the Third Order of St. Francis and is affiliated with the Minor Franciscans. In 1946, it was granted Pontifical status. Besides its presence in Malta and Gozo, the congregation has established homes in Italy, Greece, England, Ethiopia, Pakistan, Brazil, Australia, and Jerusalem.

==== Ċentru Parrokkjali San Ġużepp (Saint Joseph Parish Centre) ====
A community-focused centre located in San Ġwann, Malta. Established to support the parish community, the centre offers a variety of services and activities, including religious, educational, and social programs. It serves as a hub for parish events and gatherings, fostering community engagement and support. The centre's facilities are used for various parish functions, including meetings, classes, and community outreach initiatives, contributing to the spiritual and social development of the local community.

=== Chapels ===
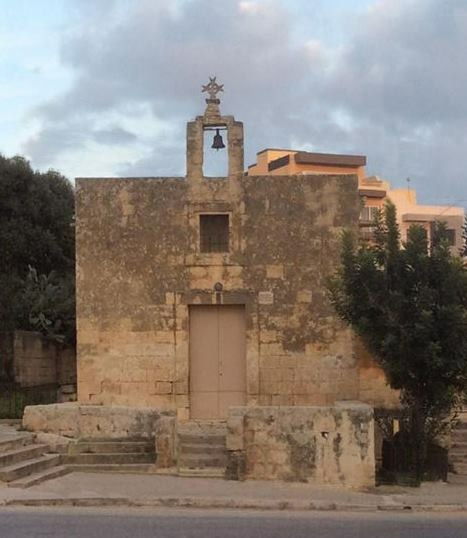
Kappella - San Ġwann tal-Għargħar

==== Kappella San Ġwann tal-Għorgħar Chapel (Saint John of the Floods Chapel) ====
The chapel, situated on one of San Ġwann's busiest roads, was originally constructed by a private family in 1546. However, it fell into disuse and was officially abandoned in 1659 by Bishop Balaguer, who declared it no longer a chapel. It was later reopened in 1672.

Architecturally, this late medieval chapel is rectangular with a cubic exterior, typical of Maltese vernacular architecture. It features a modest façade with a small parvis, two stone water spouts on each side, and a small west-facing doorway with a square clerestory window providing the only natural light to the interior. Inside, the chapel has four internal arches supporting a double-pitched roof of stone slabs covered in deffun (traditional Maltese roofing material) and a bell cot above the window, a later addition. Adjacent to the chapel is a small sacristy with a distinctive star-shaped air vent.

Notably, a small marble plaque near the chapel's door bears the inscription Non Gode l'Immunita' Ecclesia, a warning introduced in 1761 that criminals could not claim immunity if they sought refuge within the chapel. This historical warning reflects the chapel's role in the community. Today, it is used by the Christian Doctrine Society. Scheduled as a Grade 1 protected building by the Malta Environment and Planning Authority (MEPA) in 1994, the chapel is a significant cultural and historical site.

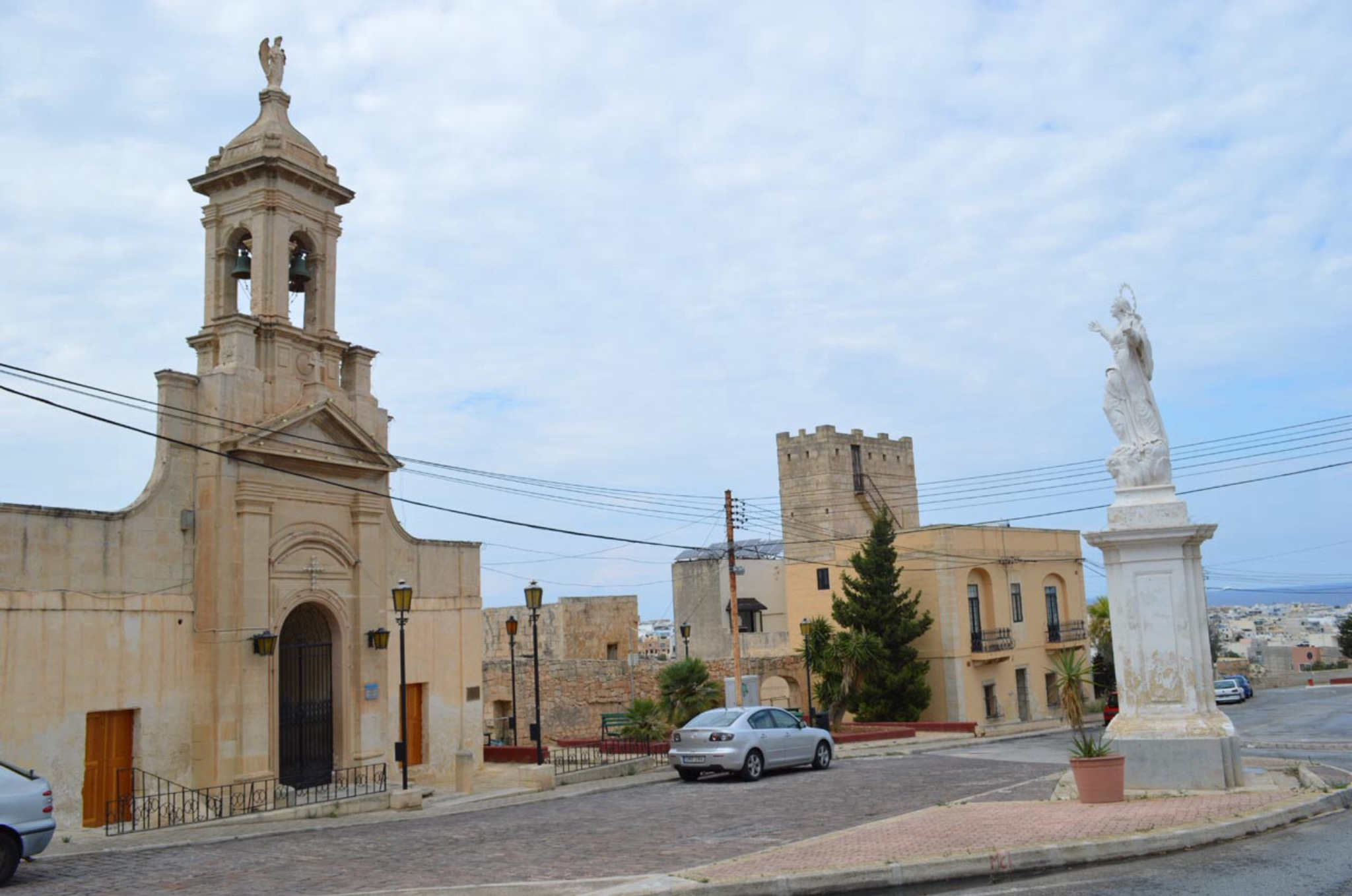
Santwarju Madonna tal-Mensija

==== Santwarju Madonna tal-Mensija (Sanctuary of Our lady of the Oblivion) ====
The Mensija Sanctuary Church in San Ġwann, Malta, was originally established in a cave used for worship during pirate invasions. This cave evolved into a troglodyte church dedicated to the Annunciation and St. Leonard, the patron saint of pirates. Accessible via a forty-step staircase, the church's name "Mensija," meaning "the forgotten place," is linked to a legend from the 15th century about a hidden image of Our Lady that repeatedly returned to the cave despite attempts to relocate it. This led to the establishment of an altar and the transformation of the site into a pilgrimage destination.

The church, with its modest interior featuring two altars and a Via Crucis, underwent significant changes and restorations over the centuries, including a major update in the 1930s by sculptor Luigi Micallef. The large statue of Our Lady of the Annunciation on the church's parvis originally stood in Ħal Balzan parish church. Today, the Mensija Sanctuary remains a vibrant place of devotion, with the Capuchin Fathers conducting services and celebrating the feast of St. Leonard, while the site continues to be adorned with numerous ex-votos.

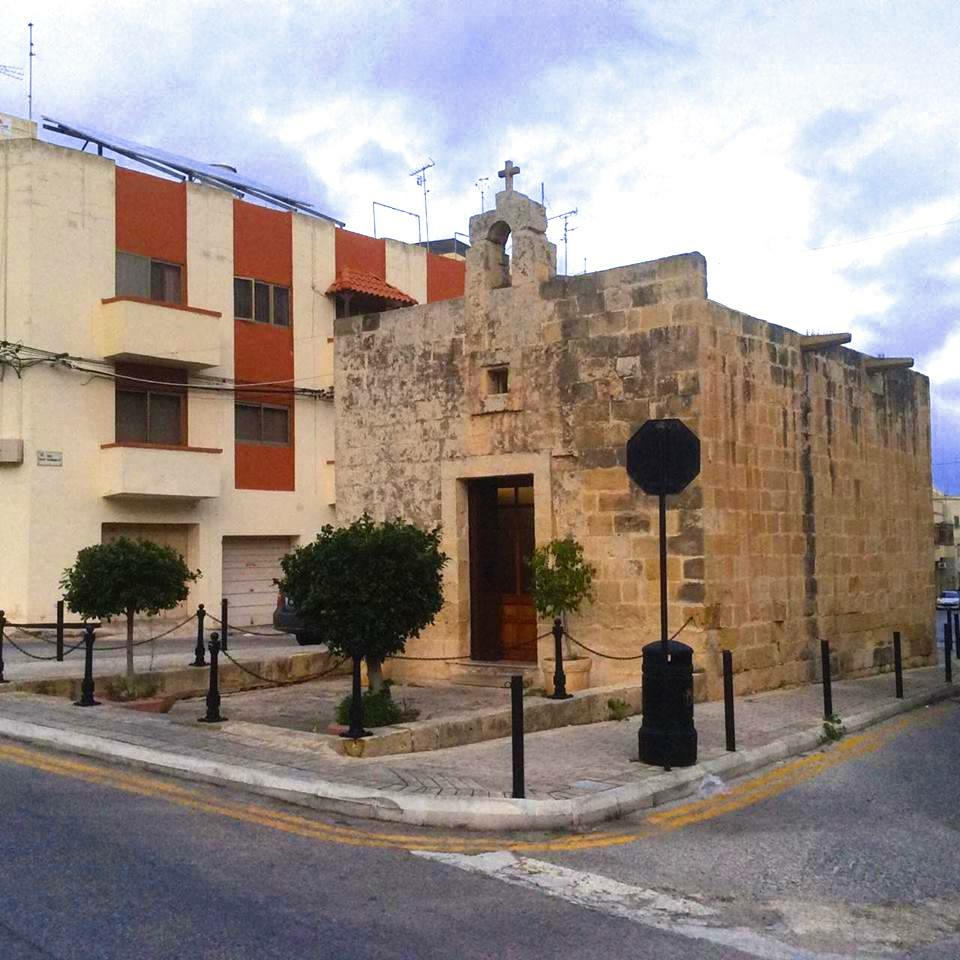
Kappella - Santa Margerita

==== Kappella Santa Margerita (Saint Margaret Chapel) ====
The 16th-century chapel, originally constructed for the farmers working the surrounding fields, holds significant historical value. It has been known by various names during the years such as: Tal-Ħereb, Tal-Imsieraħ, Tal-Arar (Tal-Għarar) u Tal-Bakkar. During World War II, the chapel was severely damaged by a direct hit, which destroyed its ceiling and one of the side walls. Following the war, the damaged parts and the original architecture of the chapel were meticulously restored in 1990.

Today, the chapel is used for Eucharistic Adoration and is recognised for its historical importance. Since 1994, it has been scheduled as a Grade 1 national monument by the Malta Environment and Planning Authority (MEPA), reflecting its cultural and architectural significance.

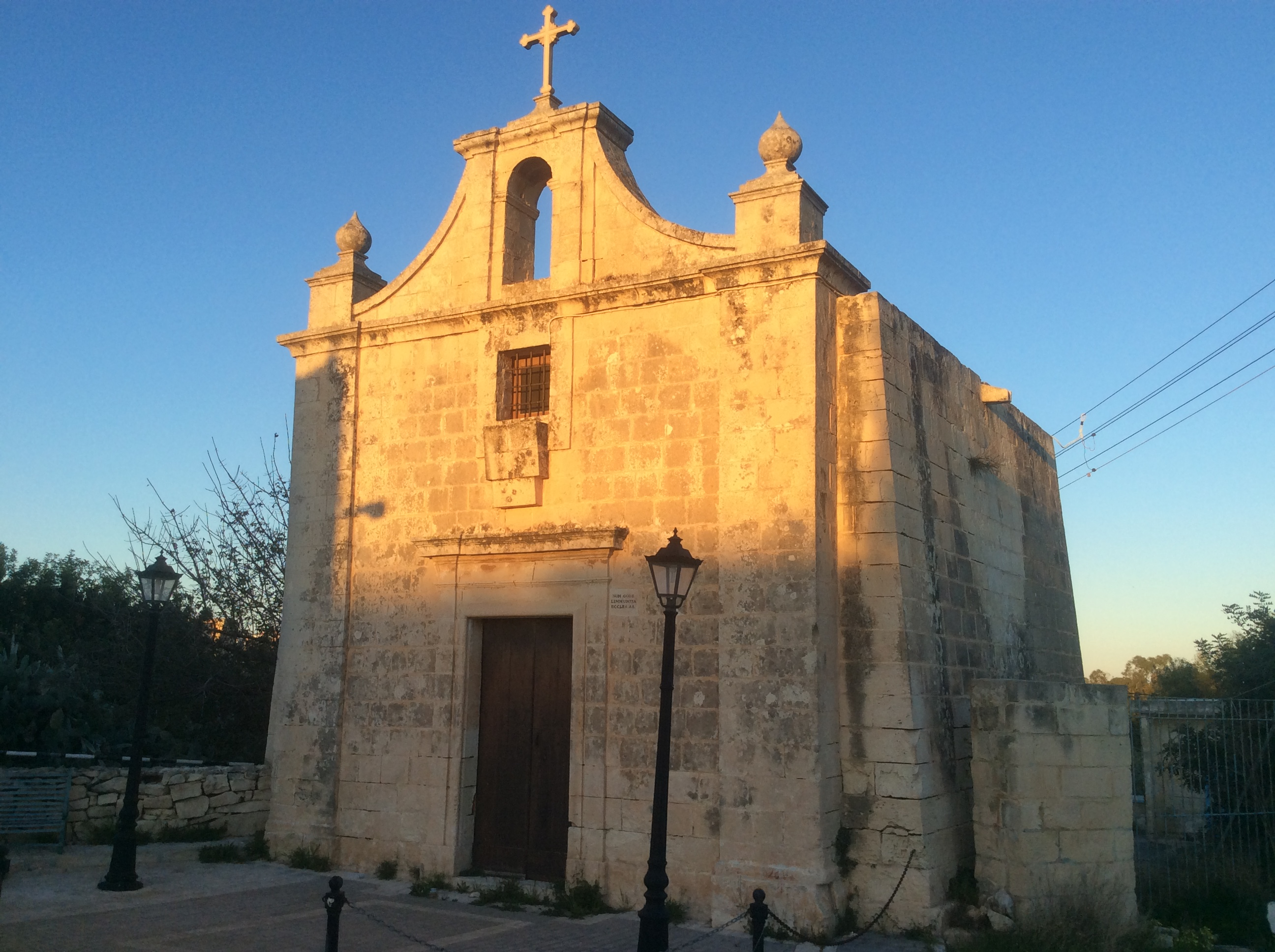
Kappella - San Filippu u San Ġakbu

==== Kappella tal-Prepostu (Provost Chapel) ====
This chapel constructed in the early 1730s, was initiated by Fr. Gaspare Giuseppe Vassallo, Provost of the Chapter of Canons of Birkirkara. In a 1732 document, Fr. Vassallo proposed building the chapel on land known as Ta' Wied Għomor to serve local farmers and their families. By the mid-20th century, the chapel was transferred to the Parish of San Ġwann when the Parish of the Immaculate Conception was established.

The chapel features a titular painting of Saint Philip and Saint James, attributed to the Maltese painter Gannikol Buhagiar. Locally known as Tal-Propostu (of the Provost) Chapel, it has undergone significant restoration, part of the Local Councils 2022 scheme, aiming to preserve the chapel's historical heritage and reinforce the community's pride in their historical landmarks.

== Religious groups ==
=== Kunsill Pastorali Parrokkjali (Parish Pastoral Council) ===
The Parish Pastoral Council (known as KPP) is an advisory body established to provide guidance to the parish priest on various matters concerning the parish, with a particular focus on pastoral issues. The KPP is composed of the local Capuchin Fraternity, the representatives from parish commissions, religious groups and volunteers, along with representatives from the pastoral zones of Ta' Zwejt and Mensija. The council is administered by the Moderator and the Secretary, with the parish priest serving as the President.

==== Parish Commissions ====
- Liturgical Commissions
- Diaconal Commissions
- Mission Commissions
- Family Commissions
- Catechetical Commissions

==== Għaqda Abbatini Parroċċa Sidtna Marija ta' Lourdes (Altar Servers group) ====
Although the primary aim of the group is to encourage boys to serve around the altar during liturgical celebrations, it offers much more than just this. The group organises religious activities such as retreats, adorations, and Lectio Divina, as well as social events like football matches, billiards, and PlayStation games. They also host quizzes, outings, and parties, where the altar servers develop life skills such as communication, teamwork, task management, punctuality, and self-confidence. Supported by their peers, the altar servers learn about responsibilities and rules that need to be followed. Additionally, they interact with children, young people, and adults of various ages, which helps them make new friends, share Christian faith, and create lasting memories together.

==== Mixja Neokatekumenali (Neocatechumenal Way) ====
The Neocatechumenal Way was first established in Malta in 1973 at the parish of the Immaculate Conception in Hamrun. In 1976, it was introduced to the parish of San Ġwann with the approval of the parish priest, Fr. Leopoldu Tabone OFMCap. Neocatechumenal communities hold two gatherings each week: one midweek for the sharing of the Word, and another on Saturday evening for the Eucharist. Within these communities, catechists are trained to conduct annual catechetical courses for adults with the aim of forming new communities. This practice continues annually, and there are currently seven such communities in San Ġwann. Some catechists from San Ġwann have also established new communities in other parishes across Malta and Gozo.

==== Grupp Kariżmatiku (Charismatic group) ====
The Catholic Charismatic Renewal movement began in Malta in May 1975. In the parish of San Ġwann, there are currently two charismatic prayer groups. The initial group was informally established at the Sanctuary of Our Lady of Minsija on 4 May 1986, and quickly evolved into a charismatic group. Following the "Little Mission" held in the parish in October of the same year, two additional prayer groups were formed—one in Kappara and the other in Monte Rosa. These groups eventually united under a single charismatic movement.

==== Leġjun ta' Marija (Legion of Mary) ====
The Legion of Mary first arrived in Malta in November 1936 and was officially established in the diocese on 23 April 1940, with the founding of the first Praesidium. In San Ġwann (then known as Imsieraħ), the Legion of Mary was introduced for the first time on 24 June 1958, with the establishment of the first Praesidium named 'Madonna tal-Minsija' (Our Lady of the Oblivion). This Praesidium was founded through the efforts of two legionaries from Birkirkara and was intended for women and girls. Miss M. C. Brincat was the first president, with Kan. Dun V. Ciappara serving as the first spiritual director. Later, on 2 February 1960, a Praesidium for women and senior girls was established through the initiative of Fr. Kornelju Bonello.

The first Praesidium of the Legion of Mary for men was established on 13 October 1960, under the name 'Sultana ta' l-Erwieħ' (Queens of Souls). It was under the leadership of its president, Dr. Anton Busuttil, and spiritual director Fr. Kornelju Bonello. It did not last long. Another Praesidium for Juniors boys was established on 6 June 1968, under the name 'Marija Ommna' (Mary Our Mother) but this also eventually closed.

On 7 October 1977, a new Praesidium for junior boys was re-established under the name 'Marija ta' Nazaret' (Mary of Nazareth). Additionally, on 20 June 1978, a new Praesidium for men was also re-established under the name 'Marija Addolorata' (Sorrowful Mary). Both of these were initiated by Fr. Donat Spiteri, who was also their spiritual director.

Another attempt by Fr. Donat was the establishment of a Praesidium for working women and girls. A small group of working women and girls began meeting in the evening due to their daytime work commitments. This led to the creation of a Praesidium under the name 'Marija Omm il-Knisja' on 17 July 1980, but it did not last long due to a shortage of members.

Once again, a similar Praesidium was re-established on 6 November 1990, under the name 'Omm il-Parir it-Tajjeb' (Mother of Good Counsel). This was initiated by Miss Angela Buttigieg and continues to this day.

== Cultural, Social and Sport Organisations ==
=== Cultural and Social Organisations ===
==== Għaqda Mużikali Madonna ta' Lourdes, San Ġwann (Our Lady of Lourdes Musical Association) ====
The San Ġwann Band has undergone several efforts to establish itself over the years. The first attempt occurred in 1959, spearheaded by Fr. Leopoldu Tabone OFMCap. Despite initial lessons provided by Maestro Angelo Pullicino, this effort was not successful.

A more successful attempt began in 1966 under the initiative of Fr. Mario Azzopardi OFMCap. A committee was formed, and music lessons commenced with conductor Carmelo Schembri. The band was officially named 'Għaqda Mużikali Madonna ta' Lourdes' on 5 May 1967. A ceremony to bless the band's standard and banner was conducted by Fr. Fortunato Pulè OFMCap, the Provincial of the Capuchin Friars at the time. The band was officially registered with the Malta Band Clubs Association on 4 November 1967. In 1975, following the parish feast, a third attempt was made to revive the band. A new committee was established, and it performed for the first time on the eve of the 1976 feast but disbanded shortly thereafter.

Despite these challenges, the desire for a local band persisted. In 1985, a new initiative led by a group of enthusiasts resulted in the formation of a provisional committee. The 'Band Club', commenced music lessons for children, leading to the formation of a new generation of band members. The band along the years relocated several times until an official Band Club was built opposite the parish church.

==== Għaqda Piroteknika 11 ta' Frar, San Ġwann (Pyrotechnic Group 11 February) ====
Founded in 1986 Maltese Fireworks Producer for the titular feast of Our Lady of Lourdes celebrated in the town of San Ġwann during the 1st weekend of August. It got its own Fireworks Factory in 1991 located in an area known as Ta' Qadi Salini.)

=== Sport Organisations ===
==== San Ġwann F.C. ====
The club was founded in 1949 as St. John F.C. when San Ġwann was known as Imsierah but later became known as San Ġwann F.C. The area in San Ġwann where the club is found is known as Tal-Gharghar. The team's colors are yellow and blue. San Ġwann footballers are known as the Saints.

== Locality Zones and Streets ==
=== 1. Ta' Żwejt ===
- Pjazza Vin. Borg (Brared) (Vincent Borg Square)
- Trejqet In-Nutar Emanuel Vitale (Notary Emanuel Vitale Lane)
- Triq Agostino Matrenza (Agostino Matrenza Street)
- Triq Alesseju Xuereb (Alessio Xuereb Street)
- Triq Anġlu Cachia (Angelo Cachia Street)
- Triq Dun Frans Camilleri (Fr Frans Camilleri Street)
- Triq George Tayar (George Tayar Street)
- Triq Ġerolamo Gianni (Gerolamo Gianni Street)
- Triq San Ġorġ Preca (St George Preca Street)
- Triq Ġuże' Abela (Joseph Abela Street)
- Triq Ġuże' Azzopardi (Joseph Azzopardi Street)
- Triq Guże' Borg (Joseph Borg Street)
- Triq Id-9 ta' Frar 1799 (9th of February 1799 Street)
- Triq il-Ħġejjeġ (The Beads Street)
- Triq il-Konti Theuma Castelletti (Count Theuma Castelletti Street)
- Triq il-Qalbiena (The Brave Street)
- Triq Ismek Tifħirek (Your Praiseworthy Name Street)
- Triq l-Assemblea Nazzjonali (National Assembly Street)
- Triq l-Erbgħa u Għoxrin ta' Ġunju (24th of June Street)
- Triq Oreste Chircop (Oreste Chircop Street)
- Triq Pawlu Galea (Paul Galea Street)
- Triq Pietru Pawl Bezzina (Peter Paul Bezzina Street)
- Triq Salvu Gatt (Salvu Gatt Street)
- Triq Sir Luigi Camilleri (Sir Luigi Camilleri Street)
- Triq Tal-Balal (Tal-Balal Road)
- Triq Tal-Prepostu (Tal-Prepostu Road)
- Triq taż Żwejt (Taż-Żwejt Road)

=== 2. Wied Għomor (Għomor Valley) ===
- Misraħ Ċentawra (Centaury Square)
- Triq Anton Inglott (Anton Inglott Street)
- Triq Envin Cremona (Envin Cremona Street)
- Triq Gian Nicola Buhagiar (Gian Nicola Buhagiar Street)
- Triq Ġiuseppe Briffa (Joseph Briffa Street)
- Triq il-Bies (Olive Press Street)
- Triq il-Ġiżi (Carnations Street)
- Triq il-Kampanella (Bellflower Street)
- Triq is-Sardinell (Geranium Street)
- Triq l-Iskola (School Street)
- Triq Plejju (Peppermint Street)
- Triq R. Caruana Dingli (R. Caruana Dingli Street)
- Triq Salvu Busuttil (Salvu Busuttil Street)
- Triq Ugo Carbonaro (Ugo Carbonaro Street)
- Triq Vincenzo Hyzler (Vincenzo Hyzler Street)
- Triq Willie Apap (Willie Apap Street)

=== 3. Misraħ Lewża (Almond Square) ===
- Misraħ Awrekarja (Aurekaria Square)
- Misraħ Lewża (Almond Square)
- Misraħ Lourdes (Lourdes Square)
- Triq Bella Vista (Beautiful View Street)
- Triq Biskus (Hyacinth Street)
- Triq Feliċ Borg (Felix Borg Street)
- Triq iċ-Ċawsli (Mulberries Street)
- Triq iċ-Ċedru (Cedar Street)
- Triq iċ-Ċirasa (Cherry Street)
- Triq il-Ballut (Oak Tree Street)
- Triq il-Begonja (Begonia Street)
- Triq il-Berquqa (Quince Street)
- Triq il-Bruka (Camellia Street)
- Triq il-Buganvilla (Bougainvillea Street)
- Triq il-Fikus (Fig Tree Street)
- Triq il-Ġakaranda (Jacaranda Street)
- Triq il-Ġewża (Walnut Street)
- Triq il-Ġibjun (Reservoir Street)
- Triq il-Ħarrub (Carob Street)
- Triq il-Ħawħa (Peach Street)
- Triq il-Ħġejjeġ (Beads Street)
- Triq il-Larinġa (Orange Street)
- Triq il-Lumija (Lemon Street)
- Triq il-Luq (Loquat Street)
- Triq il-Mandolina (Mandolin Street)
- Triq il-Mimosa (Mimosa Street)
- Triq il-Nuċipriska (Nectarine Street)
- Triq il-Palma (Palm Tree Street)
- Triq il-Prinjola (Spruce Tree Street)
- Triq il-Pruna (Dried Plum Street)
- Triq in-Narċis (Narcissus Street)
- Triq ir-Rand (Bay Laurel Street)
- Triq ir-Riċnu (Castor Oil Plant Street)
- Triq ir-Rummien (Pomegranate Street)
- Triq iż-Żebbuġ (Olive Tree Street)
- Triq iż-Żnuber (Aleppo Pine Street)
- Triq l-Akaċja (Acacia Street)
- Triq l-Ewkaliptus (Eucalyptus Street)
- Triq San Ġużepp (Saint Joseph Street)
- Triq Tal-Balal (Tal-Balal Road)
- Vjal in-Naspli (Medlars Avenue)
- Vjal ir-Riħan (Myrtle Avenue)

=== 4. Santa Margerita (Saint Margaret) ===
- Triq iċ-Ċiklamini (Cyclamens Street)
- Triq il-Fresja (Freesia Street)
- Triq il-Fuxa (Fuchsia Street)
- Triq il-Ġilju (Lily Street)
- Triq il-Ġjacintri (Hyacinths Street)
- Triq il-Gladjoli (Gladioli Street)
- Triq il-Kappella (Chapel Street)
- Triq il-Lantana (Lantana Street)
- Triq il-Lunzjata (Annunciation Street)
- Triq il-Pepprin (Poppy Street)
- Triq il-Pluviera (Plover Street)
- Triq il-Qronfol (Carnation Street)
- Triq il-Venew (Venew Street)
- Triq it-Tulipani (Tulips Street)
- Triq l-Ispika (Spikenard Street)
- Triq l-Istefanotis (Stephanotis Street)
- Triq Santa Margerita (Saint Margaret Street)
- Triq Tal-Mensija (Tal-Mensija Road)
- Triq Ward il-Ħena (Happiness Rose Street)

=== 5. The Village ===
- Triq it-Torri Lanzon (Lanzon Tower Street)
- Triq l-Ortolan (Gardener Street)
- Triq San Anard (Saint Anard Street)
- Triq Ta' Gawdieri

=== 6. Monterosa ===
- Triq Anġlu Cilia (Angelo Cilia Street)
- Triq Ċensu Barbara (Censu Barbara Street)
- Triq Guliermu Lorenzi (William Lorenzi Street)
- Triq Indri Calleja (Andrew Calleja Street)
- Triq Mudest Sapiano (Modest Sapiano Street)
- Triq Salvu Bonanno (Salvu Bonanno Street)
- Triq Santa Margerita (Saint Margaret Street)
- Triq Saver Zarb (Saver Zarb Street)
- Triq Wigi Damato (Wigi Damato Street)
- Trejqet In-Nutar Emanuel Vitale (Notary Emanuel Vitale Lane)

=== 7. Kappara ===
- Trejqet il-Gamiema (Turtle-Dove Lane)
- Trejqet is-Summien (Quail Lane)
- Trejqet l-Apparell (Apparatus Lane)
- Triq Ant. Schembri (Anthony Schembri Street)
- Triq Birkirkara (Birkirkara Road)
- Triq Ġ. Despott (G. Despott Street)
- Triq iċ-Ċawl (Crows Street)
- Triq iċ-Ċiefa (Seagull Street)
- Triq il-Bufula (Buffalo Street)
- Triq il-Falkun (Falcon Street)
- Triq il-Fjamma (Flame Street)
- Triq il-Gallina (Hen Street)
- Triq il-Gardell (Goldfinch Street)
- Triq il-Ġojjin (Linnet Street)
- Triq il-Ħida (Weaving Street)
- Triq il-Ħuttaf (Sparrowhawk Street)
- Triq il-Kokka (Owl Street)
- Triq il-Malvizz (BlackBird Street)
- Triq il-Merill (BlueRock Thrush Street)
- Triq il-Pellikkan (Pelican Street)
- Triq il-Pitirross (Robin Street)
- Triq il-Virdun (Bullfinch Street)
- Triq ir-Russett (Heron Street)
- Triq l-Isponsun (Sparrow Street)
- Triq l-Ornitoloġija (Ornithology Street)
- Triq tas-Sliema (Sliema Road)
- Triq Wied Għollieqa (Għollieqa Valley Road)

=== 8. San Andrija (Saint Andrew) ===
- Sqaq Tomna (Acre Alley)
- Triq Bernardette (Bernadette Street)
- Triq Guże Colombo (Joseph Colombo Street)
- Triq il-Kittien
- Triq il-Furrajna (Fodder Street)
- Triq il-Kapuċċini (Capuchins Street)
- Triq il-Kunċizzjoni (Conception Street)
- Triq il-Qanneb (Hemp Street)
- Triq il-Qasab (Reeds Street)
- Triq il-Qrempuċ
- Triq is-Santwarju (Sanctuary Street)
- Triq it-Tfief (Thistle Street)
- Triq ix-Xnien (Clover Street)
- Triq Leli Apap (Leli Apap Street)
- Triq Massabielle (Massabielle Street)
- Triq Sant' Andrija (Saint Andrew Street)
- Triq Sant' Antnin (Saint Anthony Street)
- Triq Santa Margerita (Saint Margaret Street)
- Triq William Savona (William Savona Street)

=== 9. Tal-Għorgħar ===
- Sqaq Żbibu (Vine Alley)
- Triq Bernardette (Bernadette Street)
- Triq Birkirkara (Birkirkara Road)
- Triq Carmen Mallia (Carmen Mallia Street)
- Triq il-Baruża (Gunpowder Street)
- Triq il-Battaljun (The Battalion Street)
- Triq il-Kittien (Spinners Street)
- Triq il-Korvu
- Triq il-Kwartier ta' Xindi (Xindi's Quarter Street)
- Triq in-Naxxar (Naxxar Road)
- Triq is-Sorijiet Franġiskani (Franciscan Sisters Street)
- Triq it-Torri Ruman (Roman Tower Street)
- Triq it-Trunċiera t-Twila (Long Trench Street)
- Triq John F Marks (John F. Marks Street)
- Triq Karm Longo (Karm Longo Street)
- Triq l-Imsieraħ
- Triq San Franġisk (Saint Francis Street)
- Triq San Ġiljan (Saint Julian Street)
- Triq San Ġwann tal-Għargħar (Saint John of the Floods Street)
- Triq San Mikiel (Saint Michael Street)
- Triq San Pawl (Saint Paul Street)
- Triq San Pietru (Saint Peter Street)
- Triq ta' Ċieda

== Twin Towns – Sister Cities ==
San Ġwann is twinned with:

- Monreale, Italy
- Caraman, France
