= The Villager (The Woodlands, Texas) =

The Woodlands Villager
- Type: Weekly
- Format: Broadsheet
- Owner: Hearst Corporation
- Publisher: Richard Davis
- Editor: Jeff Forward
- Founded: 1977
- Headquarters: 3606 Research Forest Drive; Suite 200; The Woodlands, Texas 77381; United States
- Circulation: 44,416
- Website: yourwoodlandsnews.com

The Villager is a newspaper published in The Woodlands, Texas, covering the master-planned community and the rest of southern Montgomery County, north of Houston. The award-winning weekly is distributed free to more than 44,000 households. It was formerly owned by ASP Westward.

The Villager details the development, education, diversions, and news occurring in The Woodlands community. Its letters to the Editor have become an open forum for the community to discuss political issues.

It was owned by ASP Westward LP until 2012, when it was acquired by 1013 Star Communications as part of its acquisition of Houston Community Newspapers. In 2016, the Hearst Corporation acquired Houston Community Newspapers; it is the parent company of the Houston Chronicle. As part of the deal the Villager became a part of the Hearst Corporation.
