= Village Green =

A village green is an area of common land in a village.

Village Green may also refer to:

- Village Green, New York, USA
- Village Green, Los Angeles, USA, a neighborhood
- Village Green-Green Ridge, Pennsylvania, USA, a census-designated place
- Village Green, Christchurch, New Zealand, a cricket ground
- "Village Green" (song), by The Kinks

== See also ==
- The Village Green (band), a duo
- The Village Green (news site), news site for South Orange and Maplewood, New Jersey
- The Village Green (Soccer stadium), a football stadium, Sydney, New South Wales.
