= Village Creek =

Village Creek may refer to:

== Rivers ==
- Village Creek, the lower stretch of Marin Creek in Alameda County, California
- Village Creek (Allamakee County, Iowa), an immediate tributary of the Upper Mississippi River
- Village Creek (Missouri), a stream in Missouri
- Village Creek (Texas), a tributary of the Neches River
- Village Creek (Tarrant County) Texas, a stream in North Texas

== Other ==
- Village Creek (Norwalk, Connecticut), a community
