= Cauchi =

Cauchi is a Maltese surname. Notable people with the surname include:

- Ben Cauchi (born 1974), New Zealand fine art photographer
- Denis Cauchi (born 1965), Maltese footballer, son of Tony
- Dustin Cauchi (born 1981), Maltese artist, founder of The Opioid Crisis Lookbook
- Gaia Cauchi (born 2002), Maltese singer, winner of the Junior Eurovision Song Contest 2013
- Gino Cauchi (born 1968), Maltese politician
- Jason Michael Cauchi (born 1979), American television personality known professionally as Jax Taylor
- Joel Cauchi (1983–2024), perpetrator of the 2024 Bondi Junction stabbings
- John Cauchi, Australian lawyer and Attorney General of Tonga
- Leslie Cauchi, of the vocal group the Del-Satins
- Nikol Joseph Cauchi (1929–2010), Maltese Catholic bishop of Gozo
- Thomas Cauchi, 17th century Maltese philosopher who specialised in law
- Tony Cauchi (1935–2020), Maltese footballer and manager, father of Denis

== See also ==
- Martin Cauchi Inglott, Maltese politician
- Cauchi, an alternative spelling for Chauci, found in Velleius Paterculus
- Cauchie
- Cauchy (disambiguation)
