= List of parks and gardens in Malta =

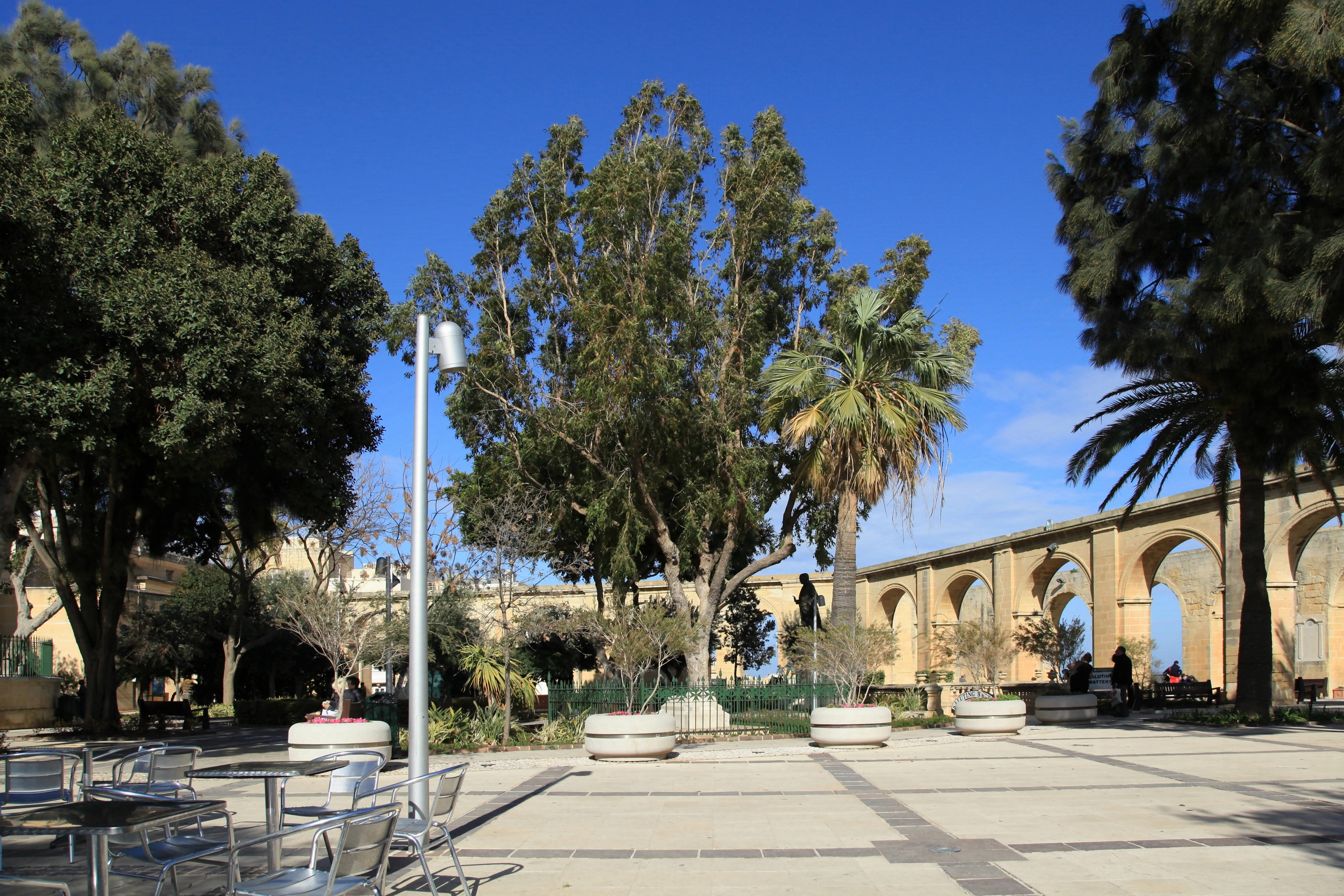
Upper Barrakka Gardens in Valletta

This is a list of parks and gardens, open to the general public, in Malta and Gozo by locality:

== Attard ==
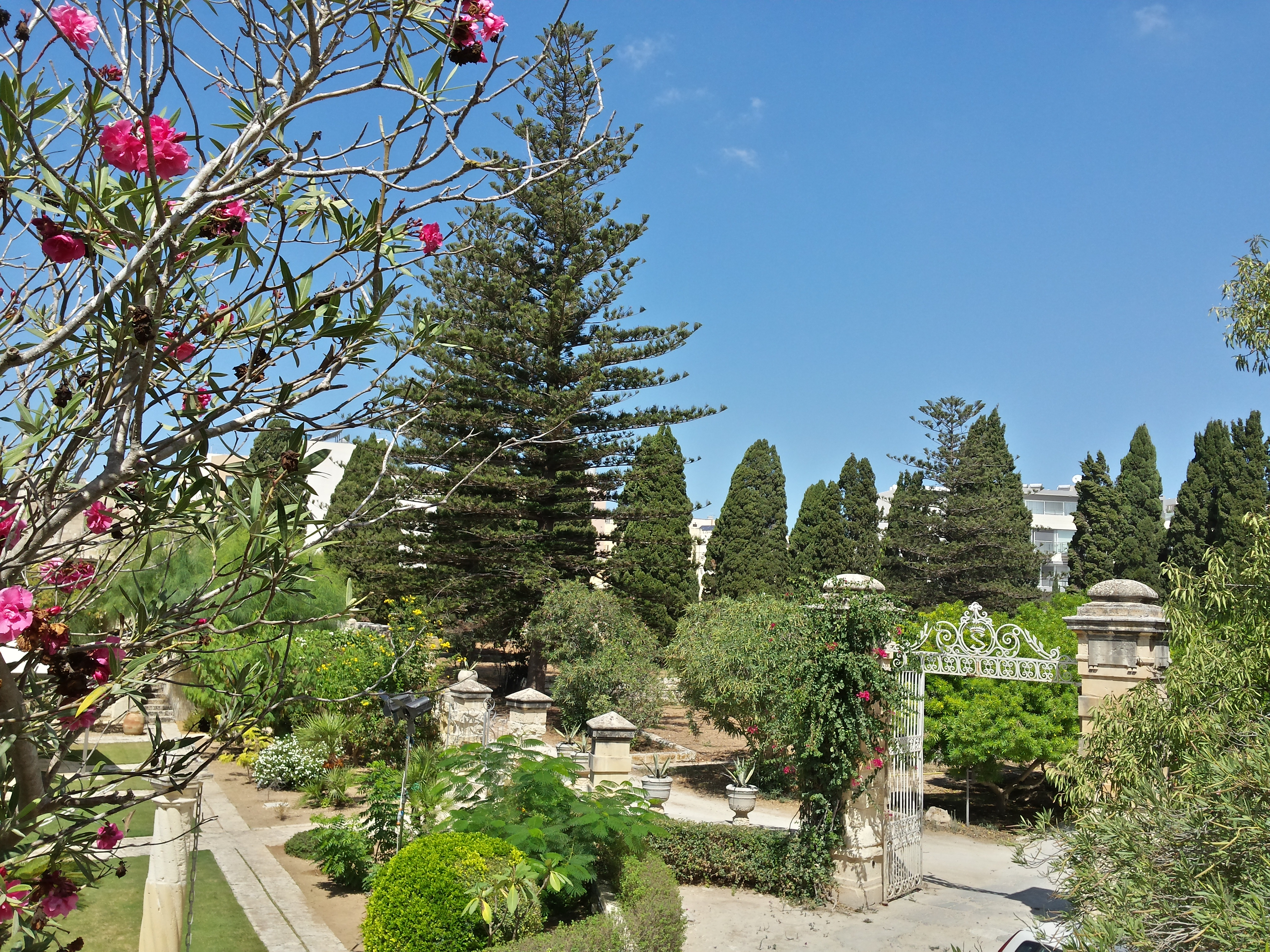
Villa Bologna Gardens

- Attard Local Council Garden (Ġnien Kunsill Lokali)
- Emvin Cremona Garden (Ġnien Emvin Cremona)
- Europa Government Nursery
- Fr. Carmelo Pace Garden (Ġardina Dun Karm Pace)
- George Zammit Garden (Ġnien Ġorġ Zammit)
- Idward Garden (Ġnien Tal-Idward)
- Kola Square Garden (Ġnien Misraħ Kola)
- Palm Garden (Ġnien il-Palma)
- Pierre Muscat Grove (Masġar Pierre Muscat)
- Railway Station Garden (Ġnien l-Istazzjon)
- Reservoir's Garden (Ġardina Tal-Ġibjun)
- San Anton Gardens (Ġnien Sant'Anton)
- Ta' Qali National Park (Park Nazzjonali Ta' Qali)
- Tal-Fuklar Garden (Ġnien Tal-Fuklar)
- Villa Bologna Gardens

== Birgu ==
- Birgu Ditch (Il-Foss tal-Birgu)

== Birkirkara ==
- Blessed Ignatius Falzon Garden (Ġnien Venerabli Nazju Falzon)
- Paul Borg Olivier Garden (Ġnien Pawlu Borg Olivier)
- Railway Track Garden (Ġnien Stazzjon)

== Birżebbuġa ==
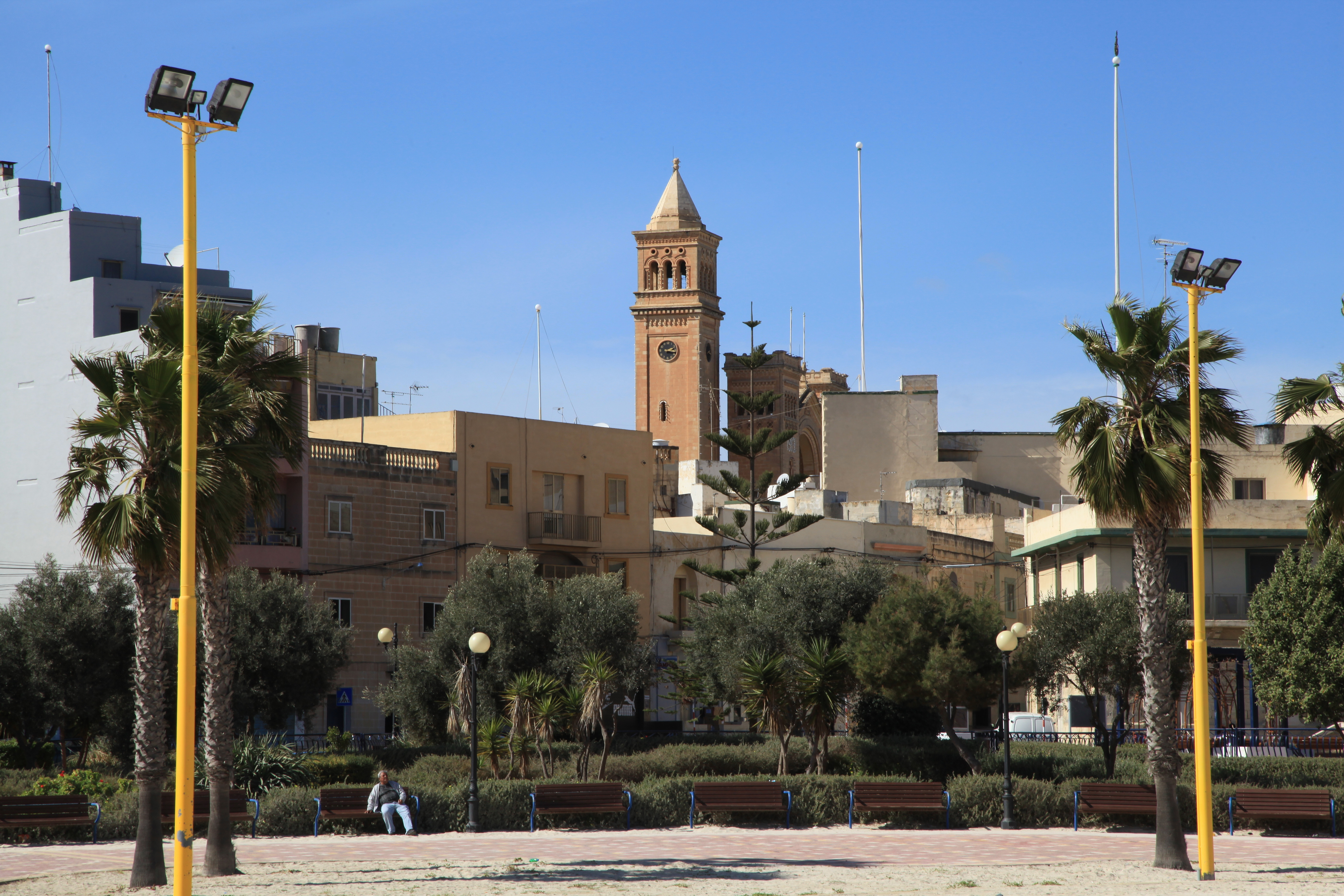
Mgr. Ġużeppi Minuti Garden

- Mgr. Ġużeppi Minuti Garden (Ġnien Mons. Ġużeppi Minuti)
- St. George's Garden (Ġnien San Ġorġ)
- Tal-Papa Garden (Ġnien Tal-Papa)

== Bormla ==
- Cottonera Gardens (Ġnien Kottoner)

== Dingli ==
- Monument Square (Misraħ il-Mafkar)
- Workers' Garden (Ġnien tal-Ħaddiema)

== Fgura ==
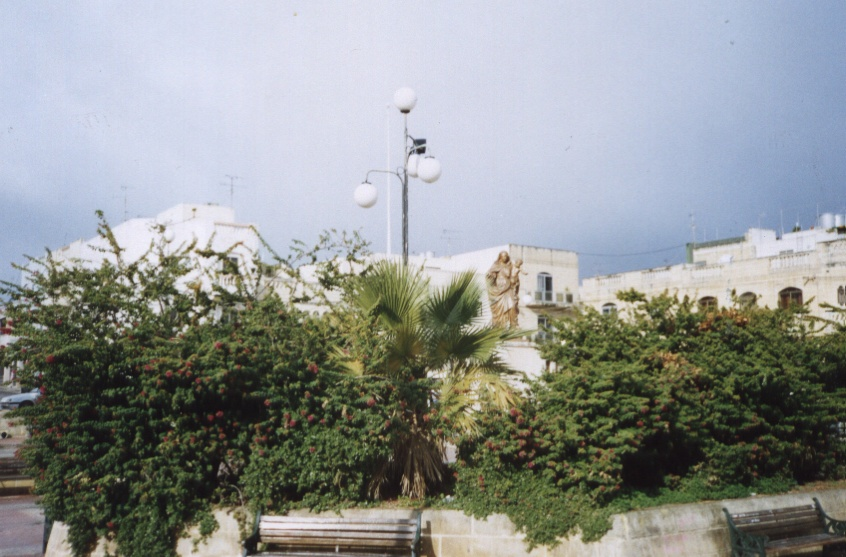
Reggie Miller Gardens

- Reggie Miller Gardens (Wesgħa Reggie Miller)
- Fgura District Park (planned)
- Wied Blandun (natural area)

== Floriana ==
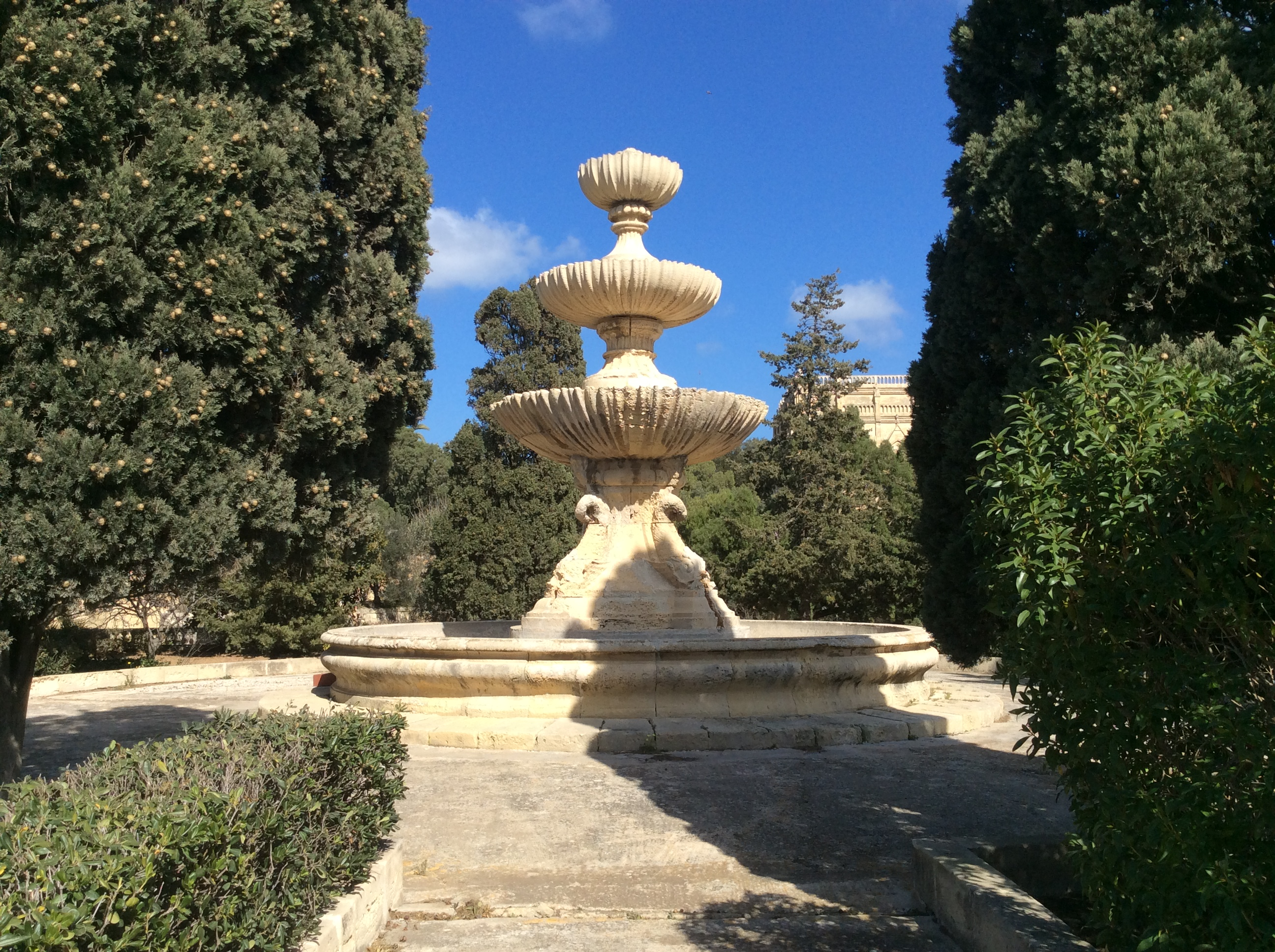
St. Philip's Gardens

- Argotti Botanic Gardens
- Herbert Ganado Gardens
- Il-Biskuttin
- Jubilee Grove (Masġar il-Ġublew)
- King George V Recreational Grounds (Ġnien Re Ġorġ V)
- Maglio Gardens (Il-Mall)
- Milorda Gardens (Ġnien tal-Milorda)
- Preziosi Gardens (Ġnien Preziosi)
- St. Philip's Gardens (Ġnien San Filippu)

== Għajnsielem ==
- Amabile Cauchi Playing Field (Bandli Amabile Cauchi)
- Visitation Square (Pjazza d-Dehra)

== Għaxaq ==
- Ħas-Saptan
- St. Rocco Playing Field (Bandli Santu Rokku)

== Gudja ==
- Raymond Caruana Garden (Ġnien Raymond Caruana)
- Xlejli Garden (Ġnien Ta' Xlejli)

== Gżira ==
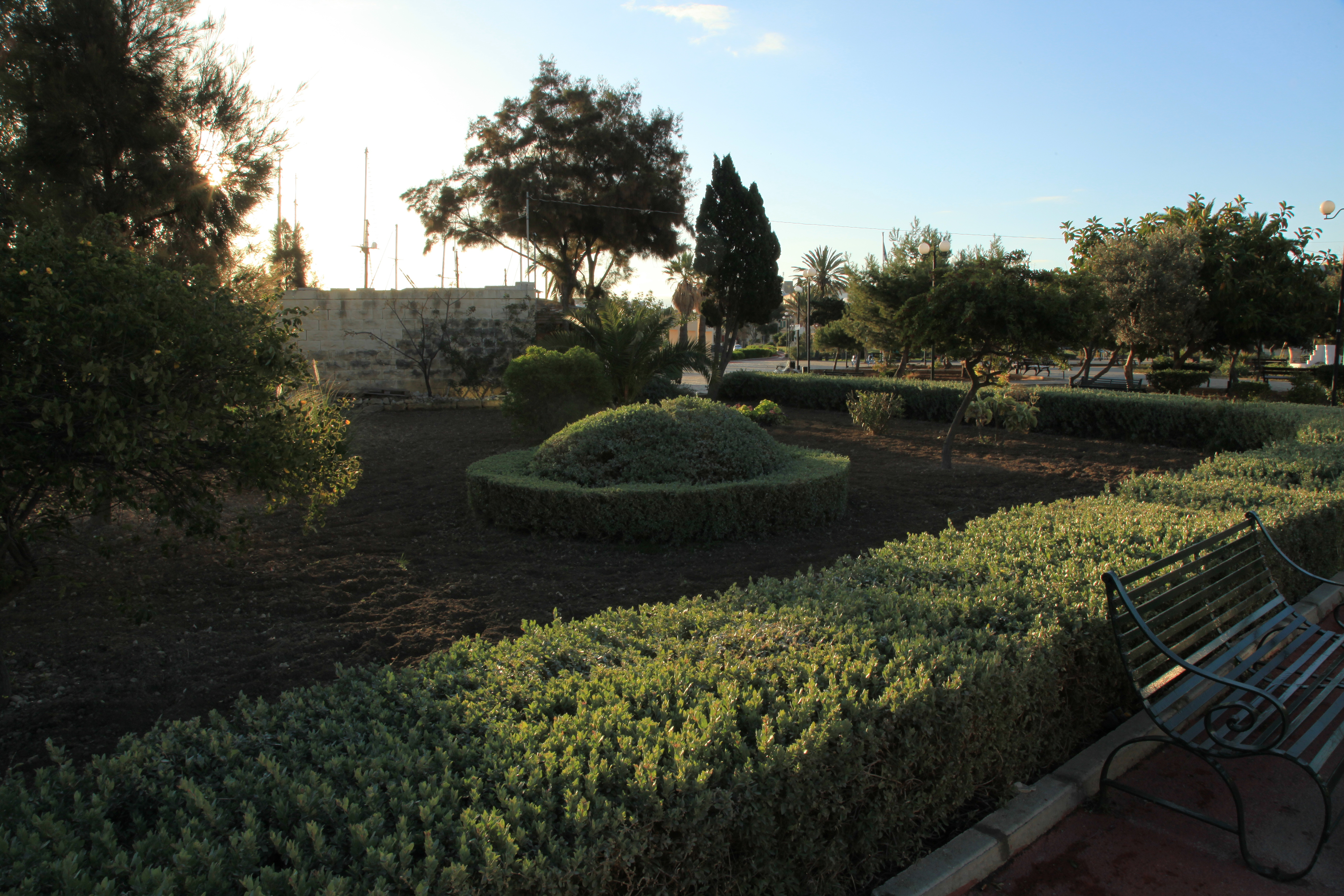
European Council Garden

- European Council Garden (Ġnien il-Kunsill tal-Ewropa)
- Scicluna Garden (Ġnien Memè Scicluna)

== Ħamrun ==
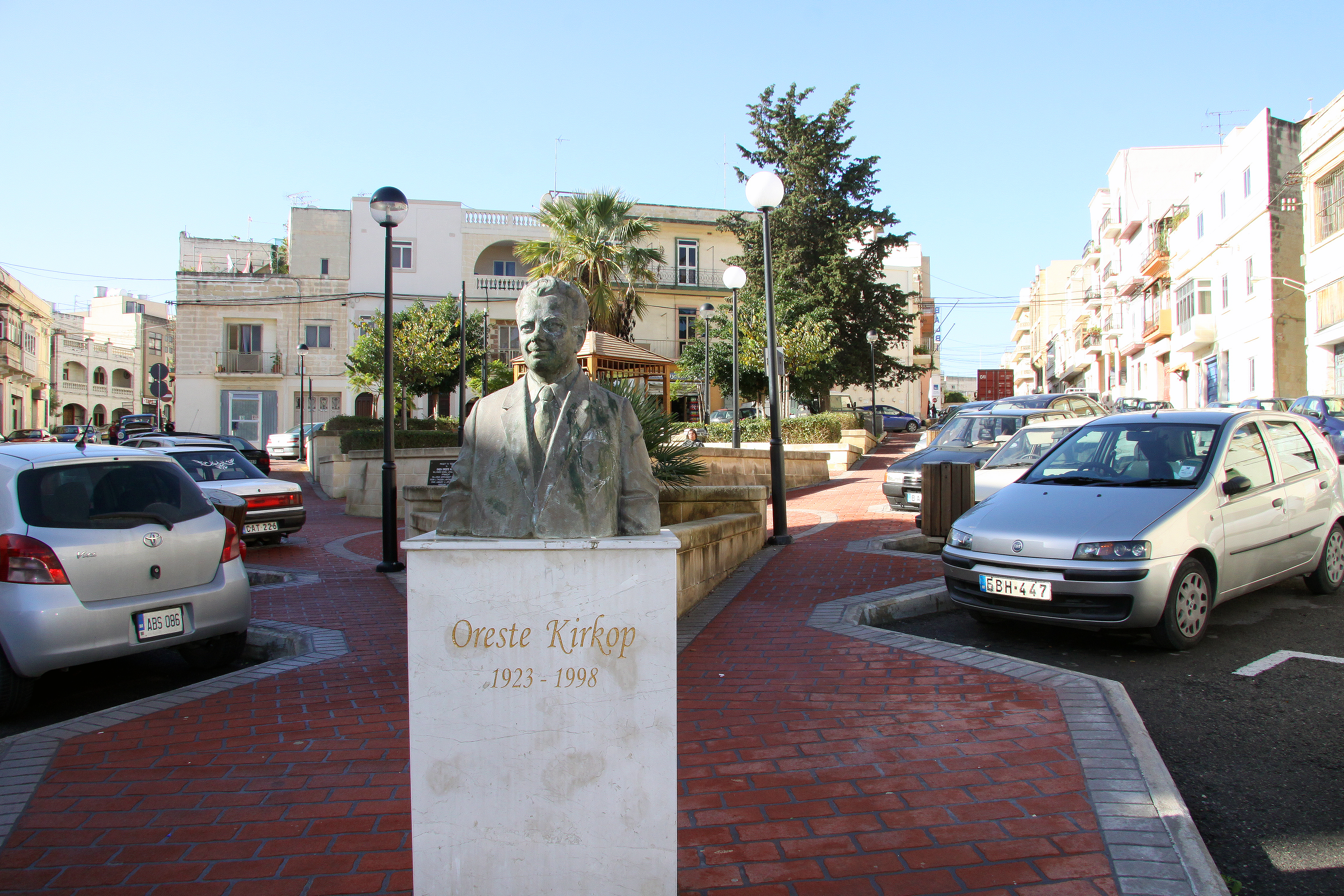
Oreste Kirkop Garden

- Anton Buttigieg Garden (Ġnien Anton Buttigieg)
- John Mizzi Grove (Masġar John Mizzi)
- Oreste Kirkop Garden (Ġnien Oreste Kirkop)

== Iklin ==
- Ninu Cremona Square (Pjazza Ninu Cremona)

== Isla ==
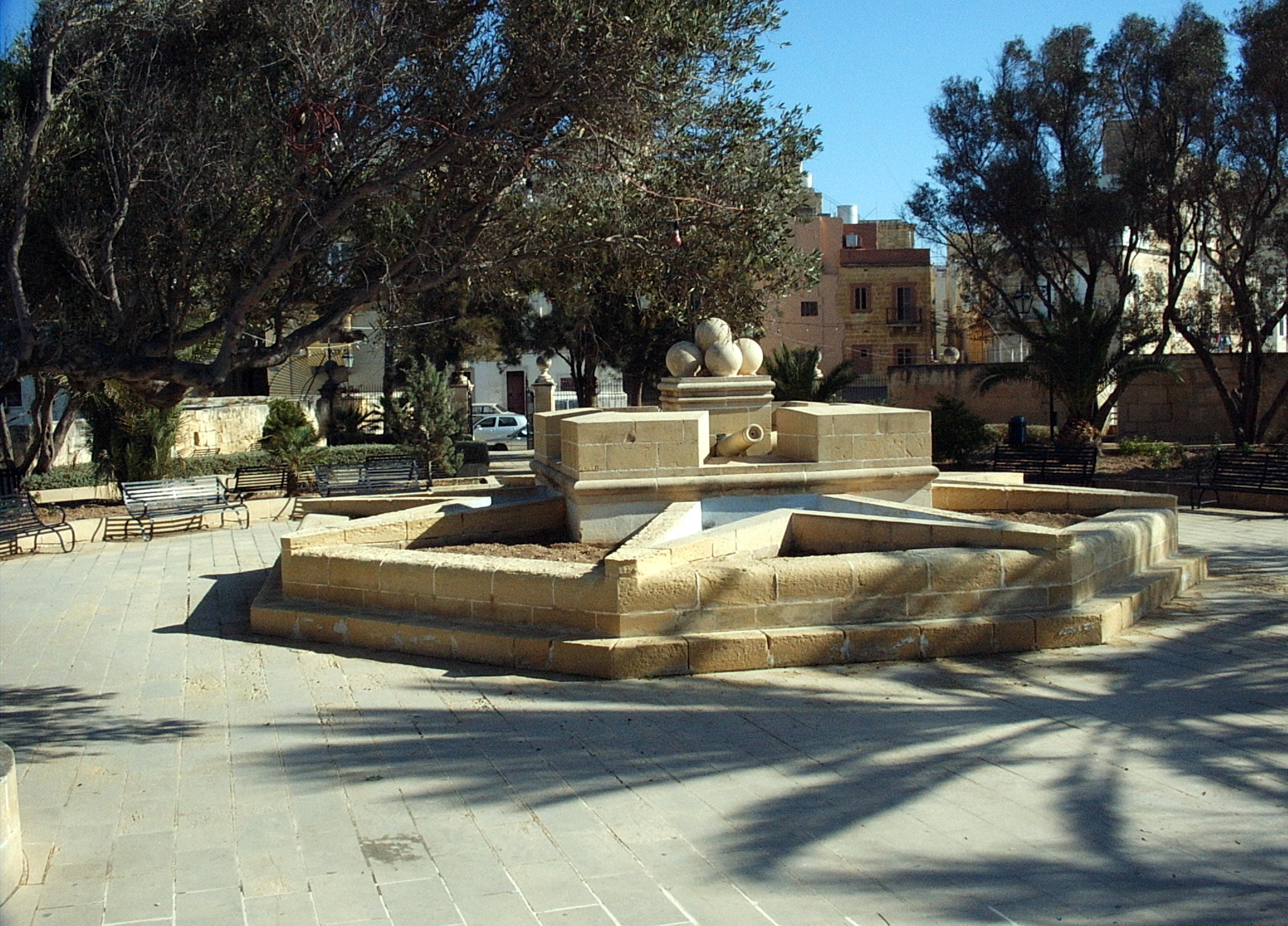
Gardjola Garden

- Gardjola Garden (Ġnien il-Gardjola)
- Safe Haven Garden

== Kalkara ==
- Archbishop Gonzi Square (Misraħ l-Arċisqof Gonzi)
- Our Saviour's Garden (Ġnien is-Salvatur)

== Luqa ==
- Youths Square (Misraħ iż-Żgħażagħ)

== Marsa ==
- Belvedere Garden (Ġnien Belvedere)
- Għammieri Farm
- Juan Mamo Garden (Ġnien Juan Mamo)
- Spencer Gardens (Ġnien Spencer)

== Marsaskala ==
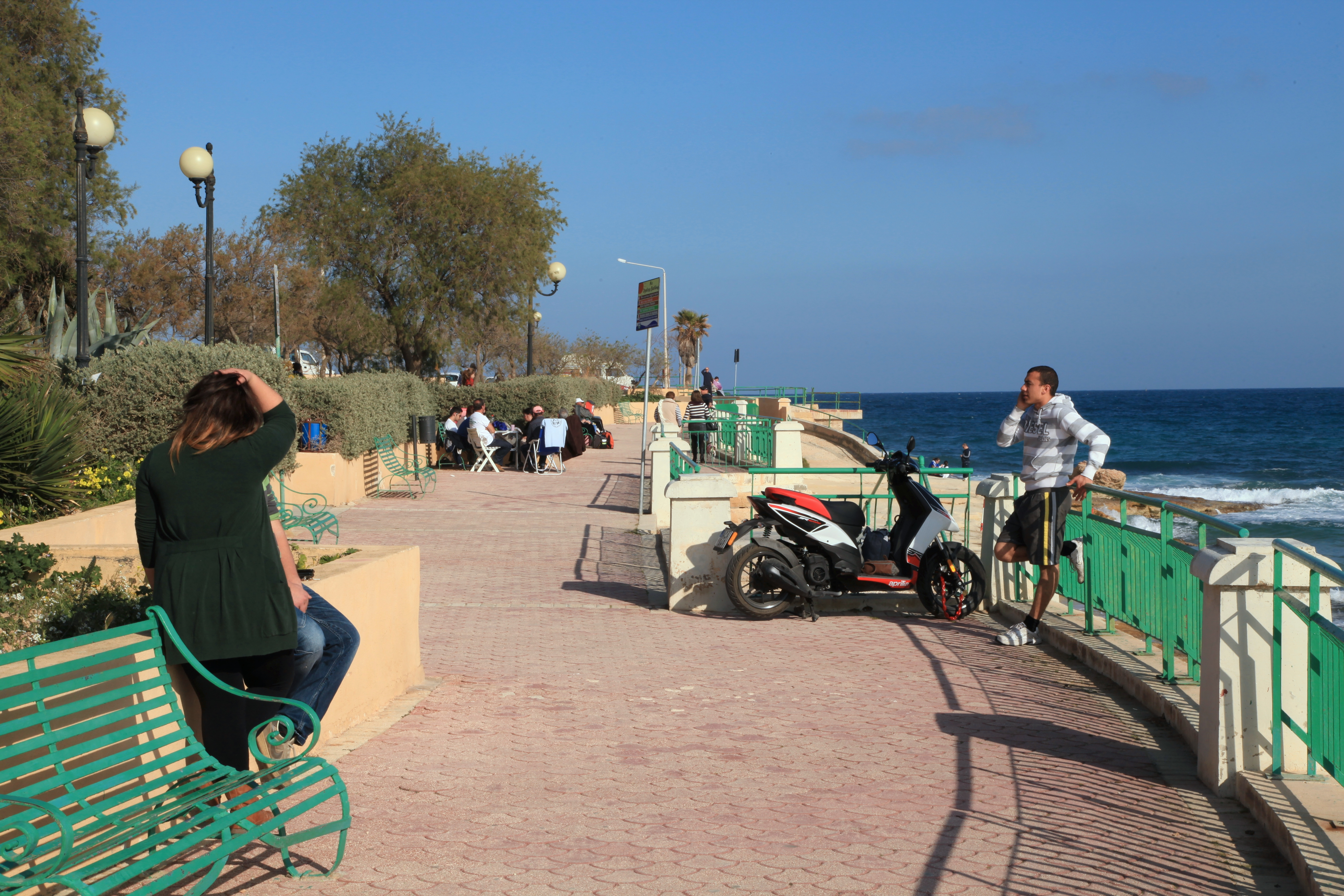
St. Thomas Bay Garden

- Friendship Park
- Il-Magħluq Park
- Mifsud Bonnici Playing Field (Bandli Mifsud Bonnici)
- St. Thomas Bay Garden (Ġnien il-Bajja ta' San Tumas)
- Żonqor Playing Field (Bandli taż-Żonqor)

== Marsaxlokk ==
- Magħluq Playing Field (Bandli tal-Magħluq)
- Roman Port Garden (Ġnien il-Port Ruman)
- Xrobb l-Għaġin Nature Park (Park Xrobb l-Għaġin)

== Mdina ==
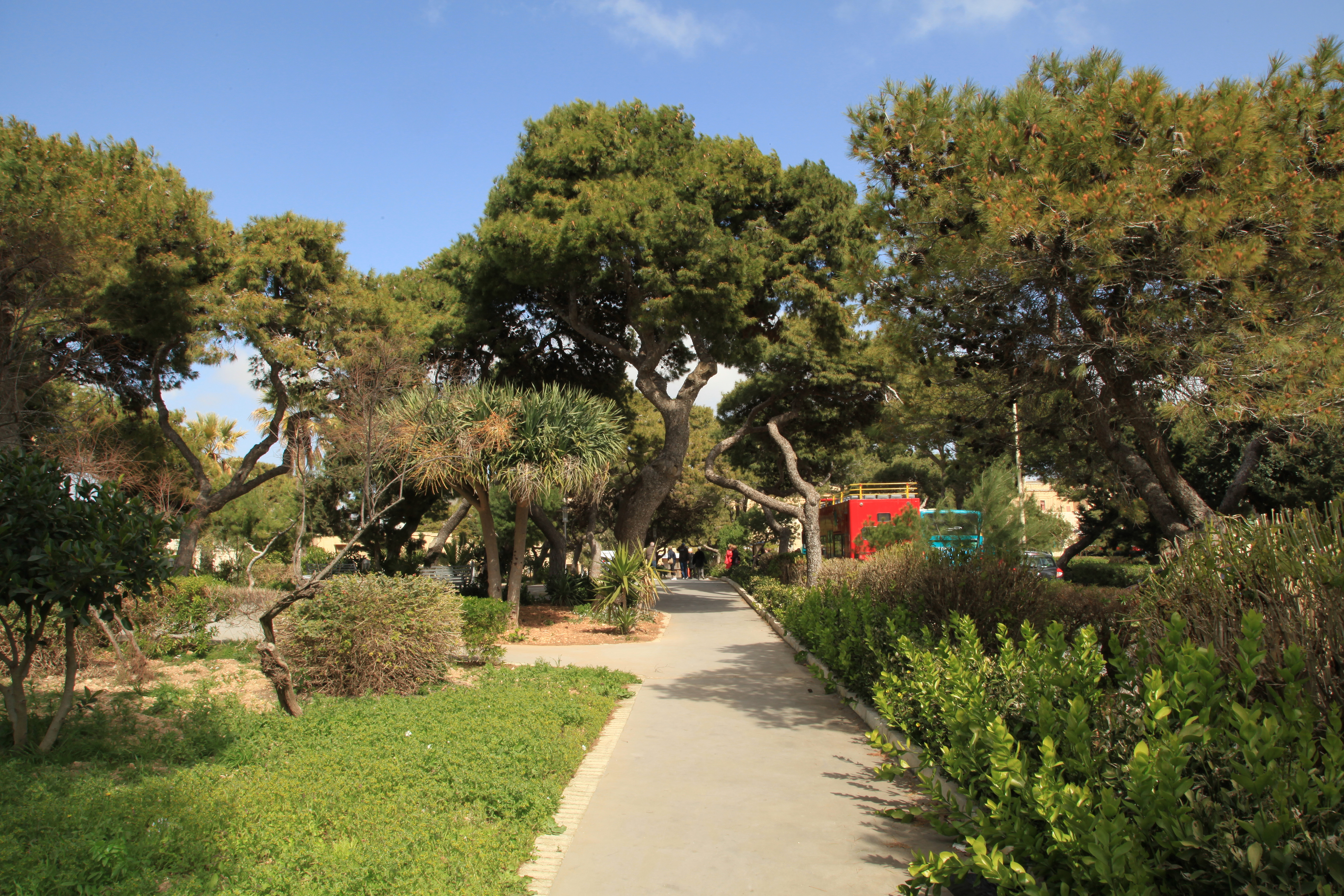
Howard Gardens

- Hira Gardens (Ġnien Ħira)
- Howard Gardens (Ġnien Howard)
- Mdina Ditch (Il-Foss tal-Imdina)
- Saqqajja Playing Field (Bandli Tas-Saqqajja)

== Mellieħa ==
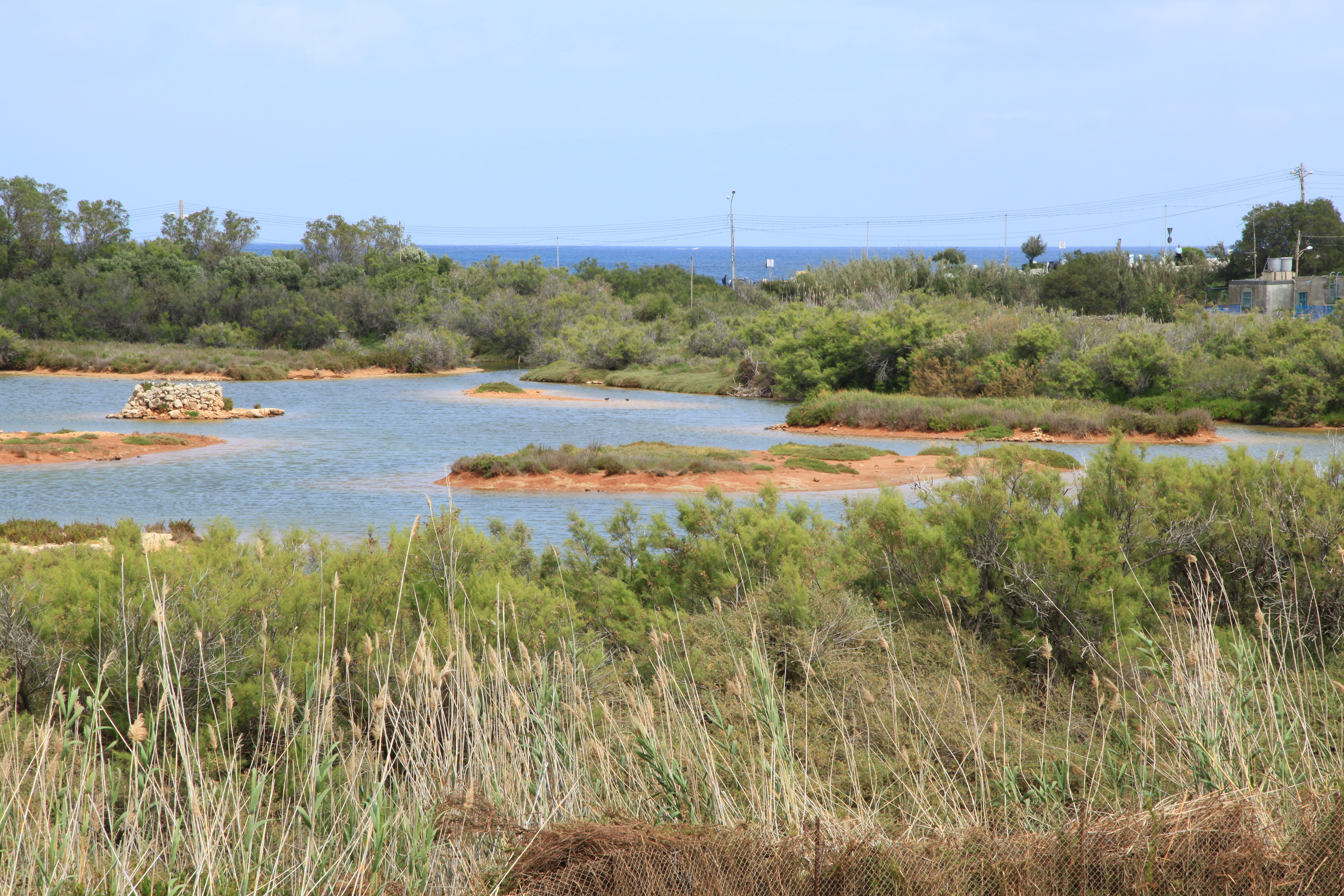
Għadira Nature Reserve

- L-Aħrax tal-Mellieħa
- Fr. Anton Debono Garden (Ġnien Dun Anton Debono)
- Gate's Garden (Ġnien Ta' Xatba)
- Għadira Nature Reserve
- Ingraw Gardens (Ġnien Ingraw)
- Majjistral Park (Manikata)
- Qigħan Garden (Ġnien il-Qigħan)
- Tas-Salib Square (Misraħ Tas-Salib)
- Wesgħa Narċis

== Mosta ==
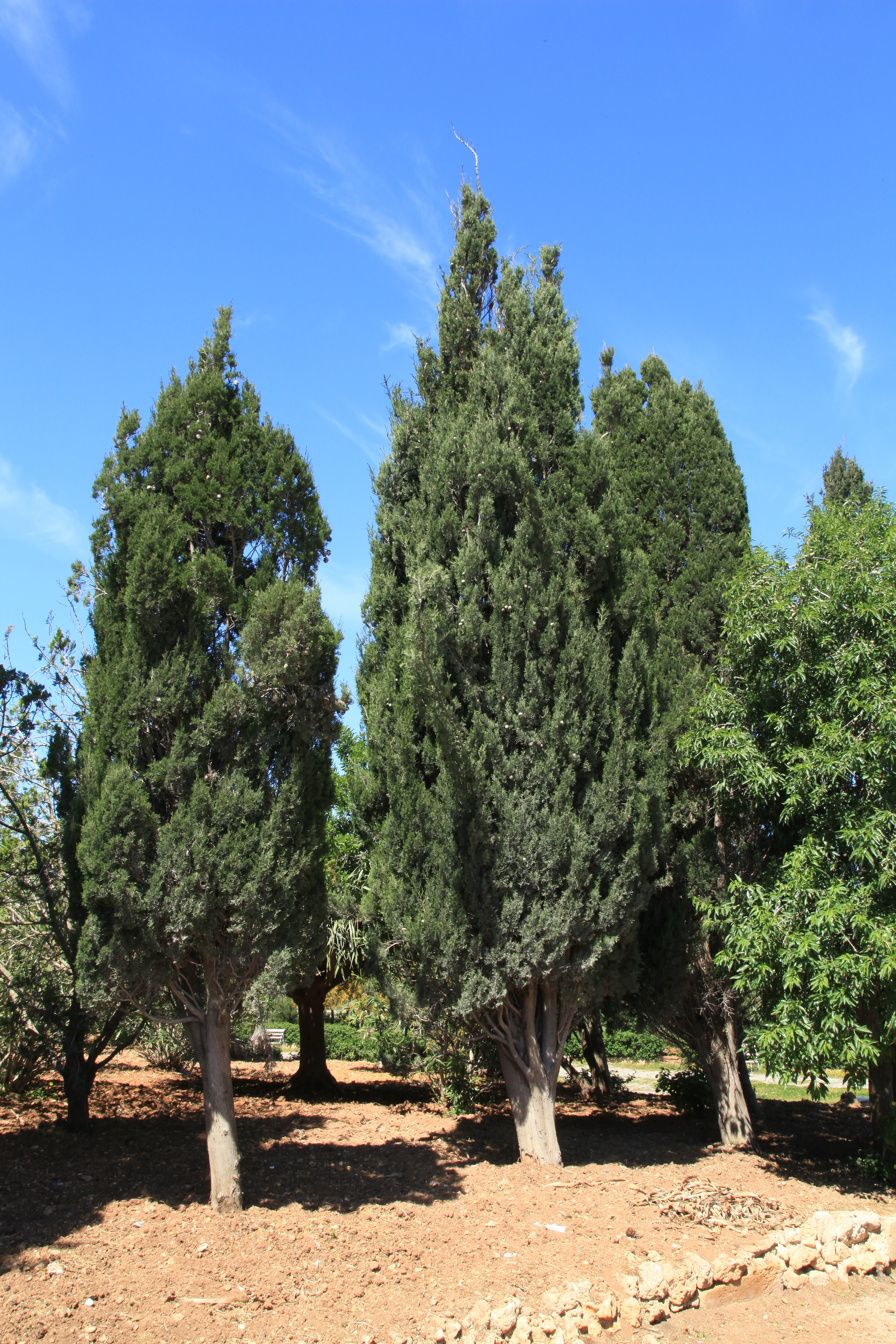
Ġnien l-Għarusa tal-Mosta

- 15 October Garden (Ġnien 15 ta' Ottubru)
- Mosta Bride's Garden (Ġnien l-Għarusa tal-Mosta)
- Reggie Cilia Garden (Ġnien Reggie Cilia)
- San Ġużepp tat-Tarġa

== Mqabba ==
- The Small Mission Square (Misraħ il-Missjoni ż-Żgħira)

== Msida ==
- Misraħ il-Menqa
- Wied Għollieqa Nature Reserve

== Mtarfa ==
- Mtarfa Belvedere Garden

== Nadur ==
Ta' Kenuna Garden

- Nadur Local Council Garden (Ġnien Kunsill Lokali Nadur)
- San Blas Garden (Ġnien San Blas)
- Ta' Kenuna Garden (Ġnien Ta' Kenuna)
- Tal-Ħali Playing Field (Bandli Tal-Ħali)

== Naxxar ==
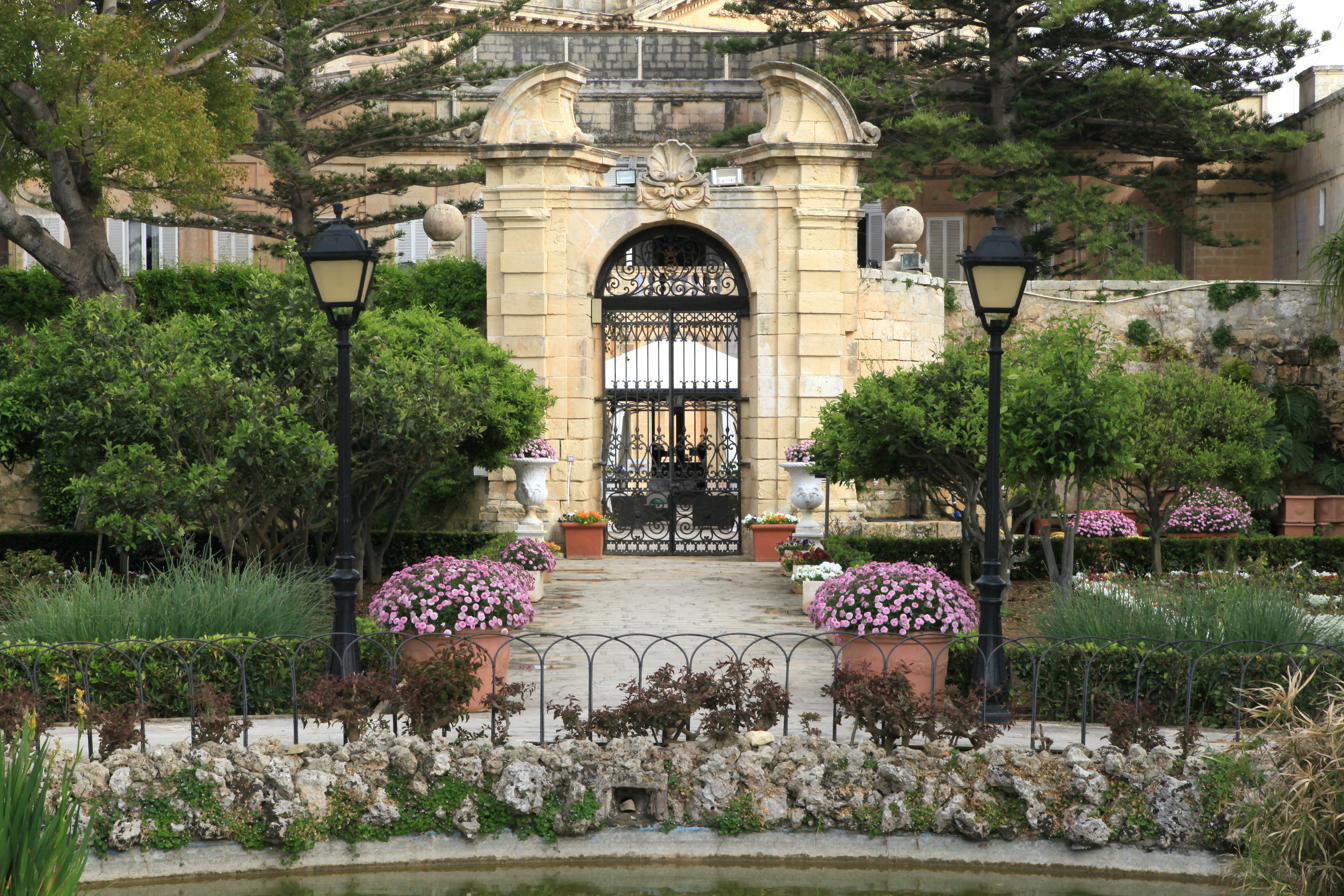
Palazzo Parisio Gardens

- Cherry Garden (Ġnien Ċirasa)
- Palazzo Parisio Gardens
- Soil Garden (Ġnien il-Ħamrija)

== Paola ==
- Lorry Sant Garden (Ġnien Lorry Sant)
- Mediterranean Gardens (Ġnien il-Mediterran) - formerly called Gaddafi Gardens (Ġnien Gaddafi) or Libyans' Garden (Ġnien il-Libjani)
- Mgr. Frances Xuereb Garden (Ġnien Mons. Franġisku Xuereb)
- Sir Paul Boffa Garden (Ġnien Sir Pawlu Boffa)

== Pembroke ==
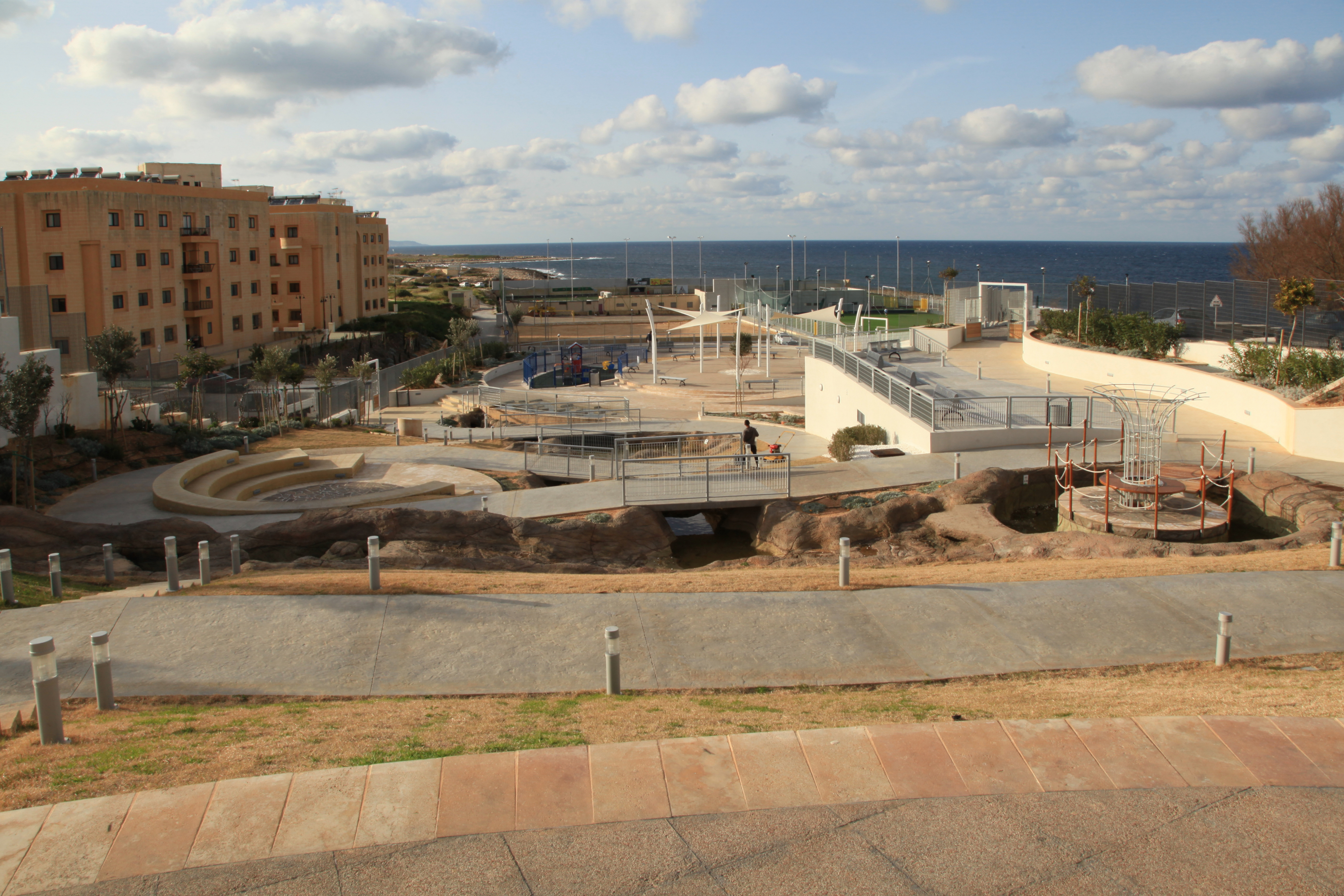
Pembroke Garden

- 4 July Garden (Ġnien l-4 ta' Lulju)
- Pembroke Garden (Ġnien Pembroke)

== Qala ==
- Family's Garden (Ġnien Tal-Familja)
- Magistrate Saviour Attard Garden (Ġnien il-Maġistrat Salvu Attard)

== Qormi ==
- De La Cruz Avenue Garden (Ġnien f'Vjal De La Cruz)
- Maemple Square (Pjazza Maemple)
- Robert Hyzler Garden (Ġnien Bertu Hyzler)
- War Victims' Garden (Ġnien il-Vittmi tal-Gwerra)

== Qrendi ==
- Commander's Garden (Ġnien tal-Kmand)
- Dame Cecilia Pick Garden (Ġnien Dame Cecilia Pick)

== Rabat ==
- Buskett Gardens
- Chadwick Lakes

== Safi ==
- 13 April Garden (Ġnien it-13 ta' April)
- Sir Alexander Ball's Garden (Ġnien Alexander Ball)
- Fr. Carmelo Vella Garden (Ġnien Dun Karm Vella)

== San Ġiljan ==
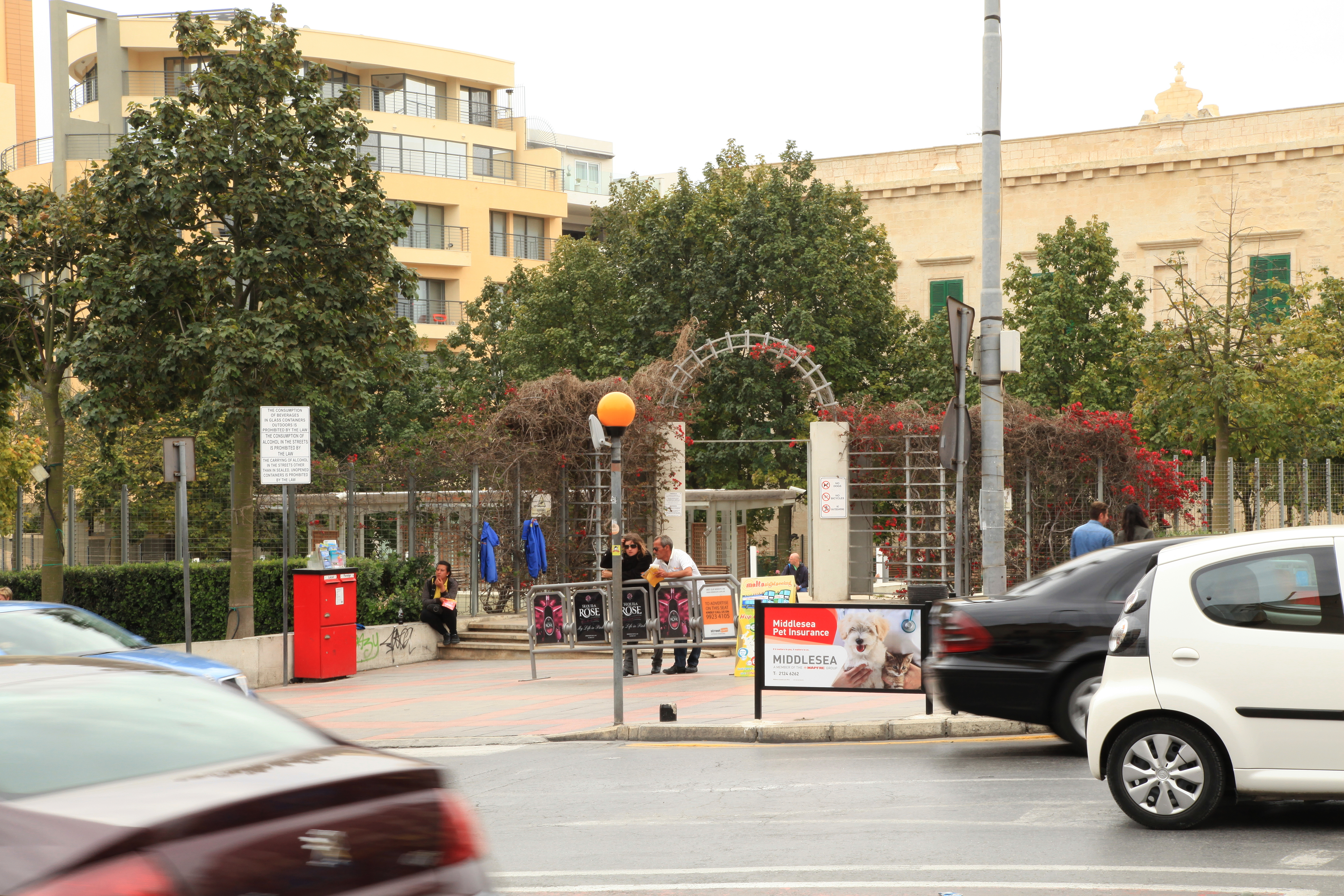
Spinola Palace Garden

- Balluta Square (Pjazza Balluta)
- Spinola Palace Garden (Ġnien tal-Palazz ta' Spinola)

== San Ġwann ==
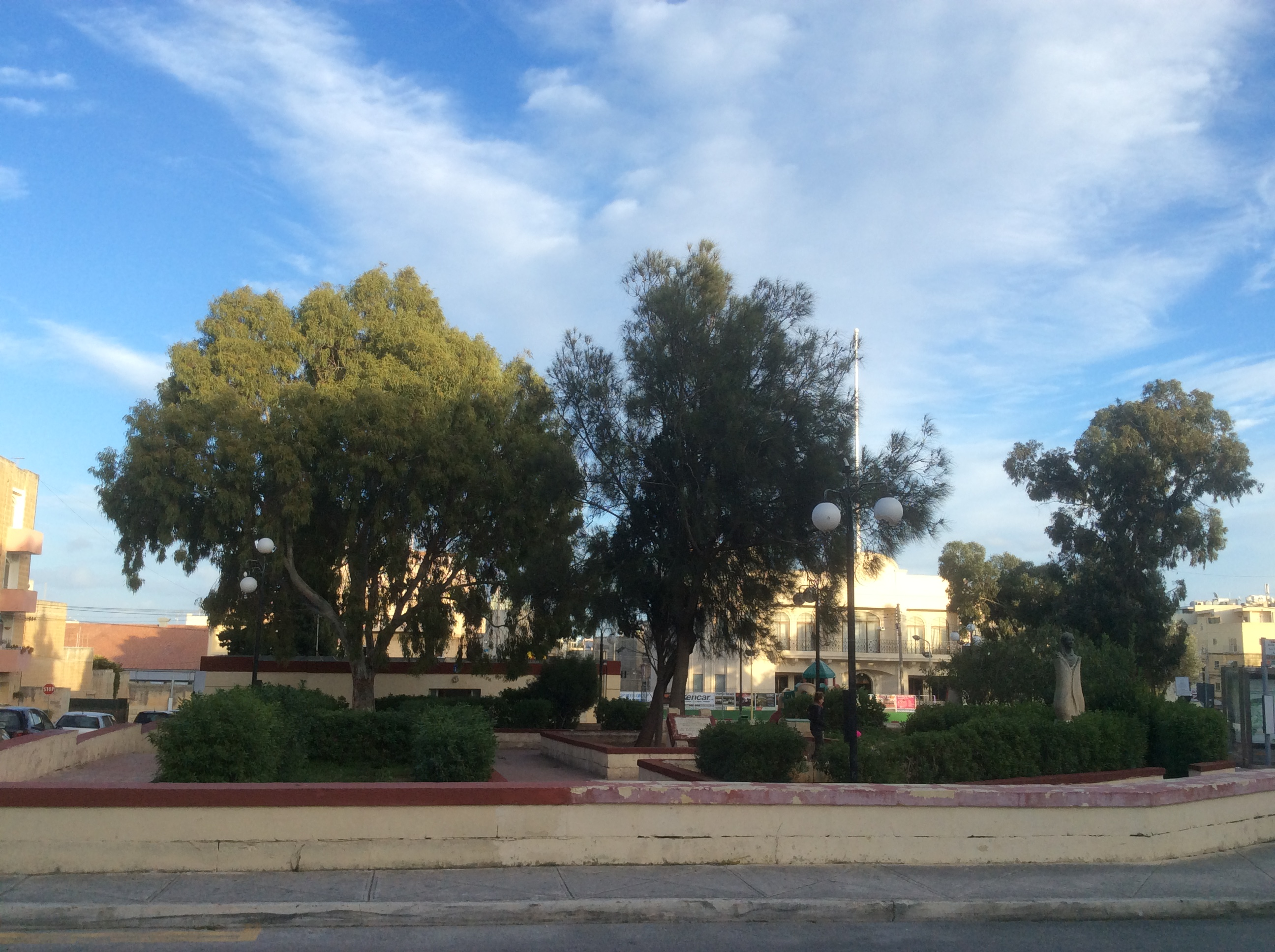
Karin Grech Garden

- George Zarb Garden (Ġnien George Zarb)
- Karin Grech Garden (Ġnien Karin Grech)
- Victoria Gardens Playingfield

== San Pawl il-Baħar ==
- Anton Buttigieg Garden (Ġnien Anton Buttigieg)
- Kennedy Grove
- Simar Nature Reserve

== Santa Luċija ==
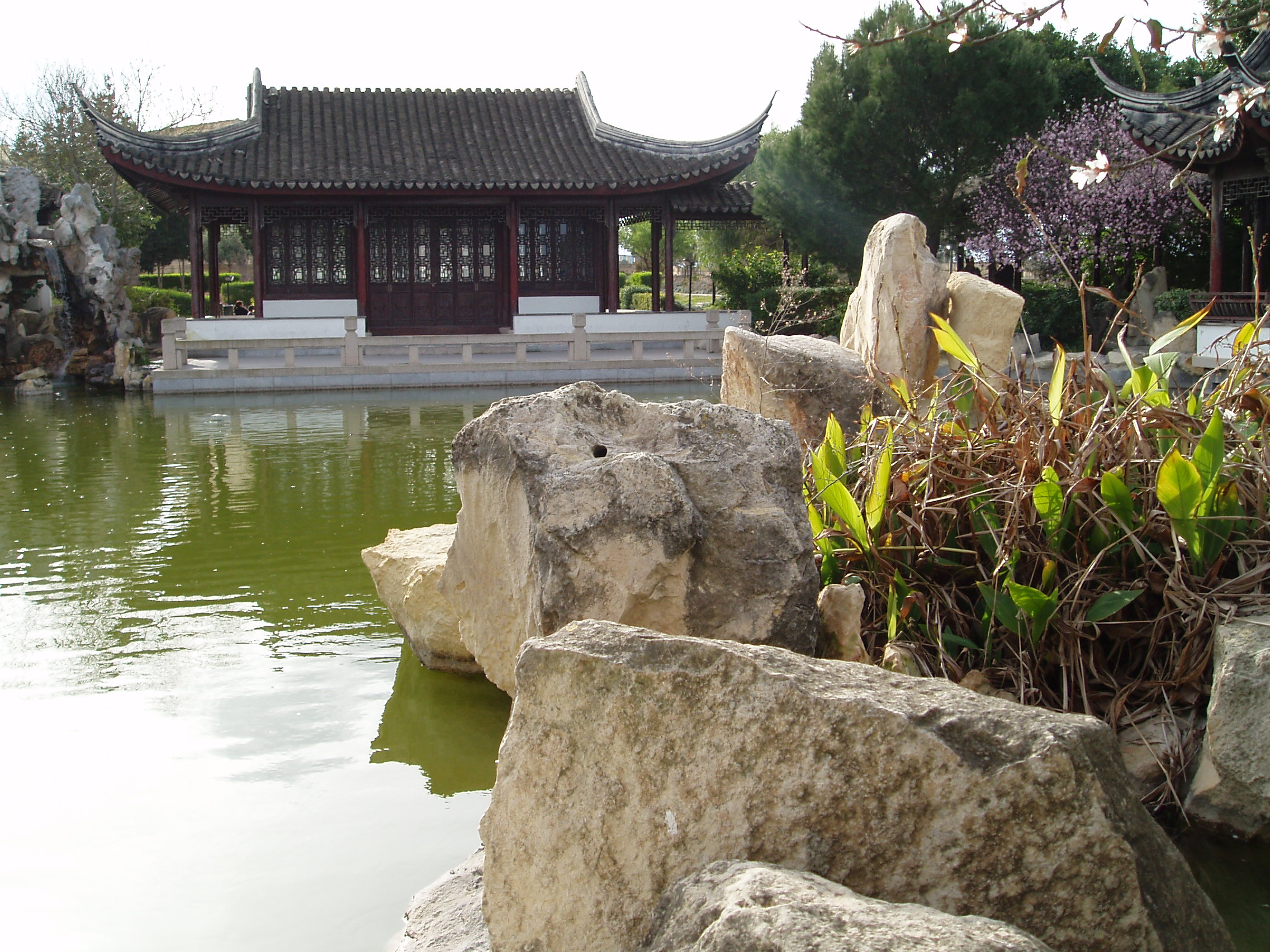
Chinese Garden of Serenity

- Chinese Garden of Serenity (Ġnien is-Serenità)
- Santa Lucia Garden (Ġnien Santa Luċija)

== Santa Venera ==
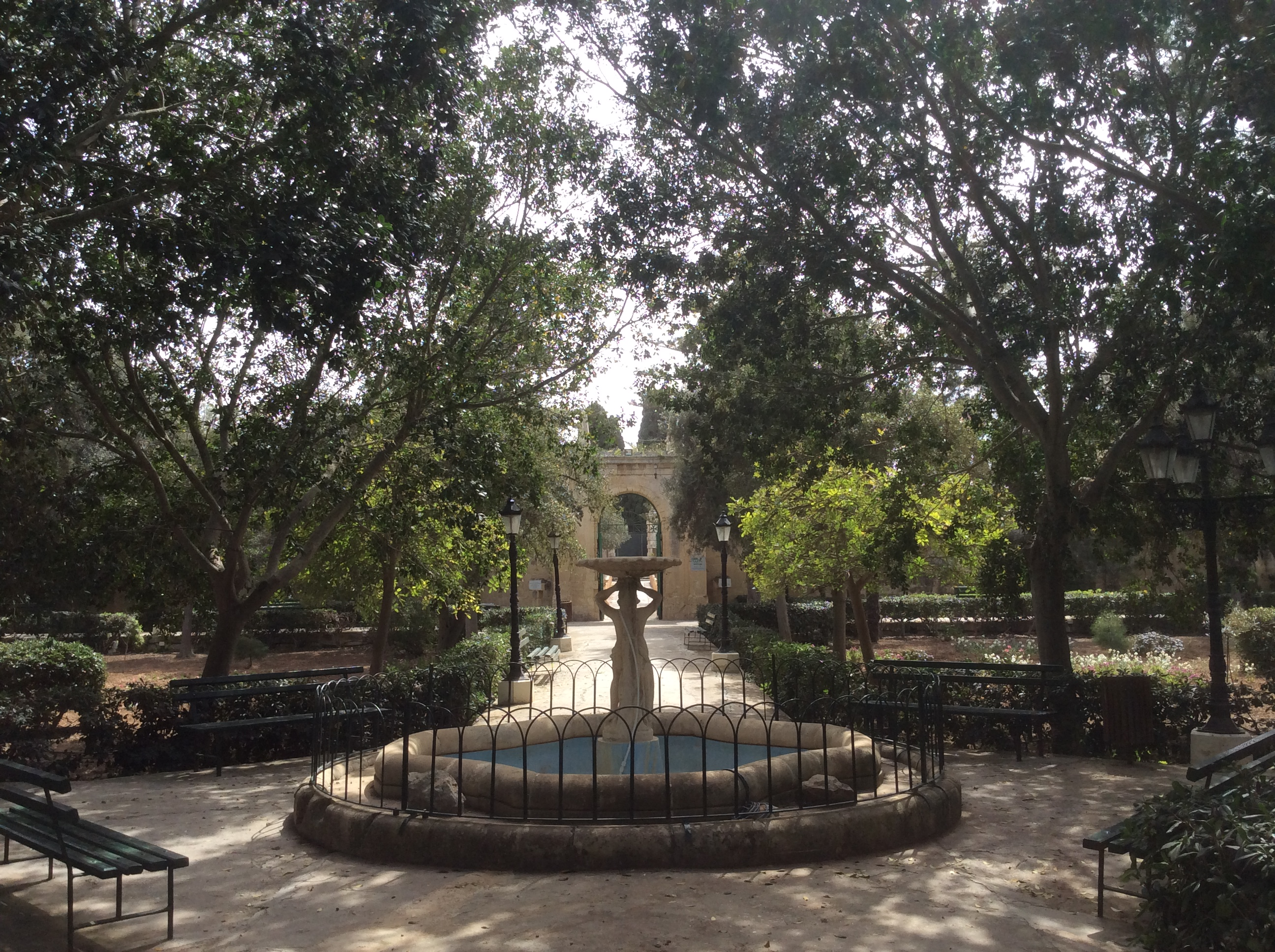
Romeo Romano Gardens

- Romeo Romano Gardens (Ġnien Romeo Romano)
- St. George Preca Garden (Ġnien San Ġorġ Preca)

== Siġġiewi ==
- Buskett Gardens (Il-Buskett)
- Città Ferdinand Square (Pjazza Ċittà Ferdinand)

== Sliema ==
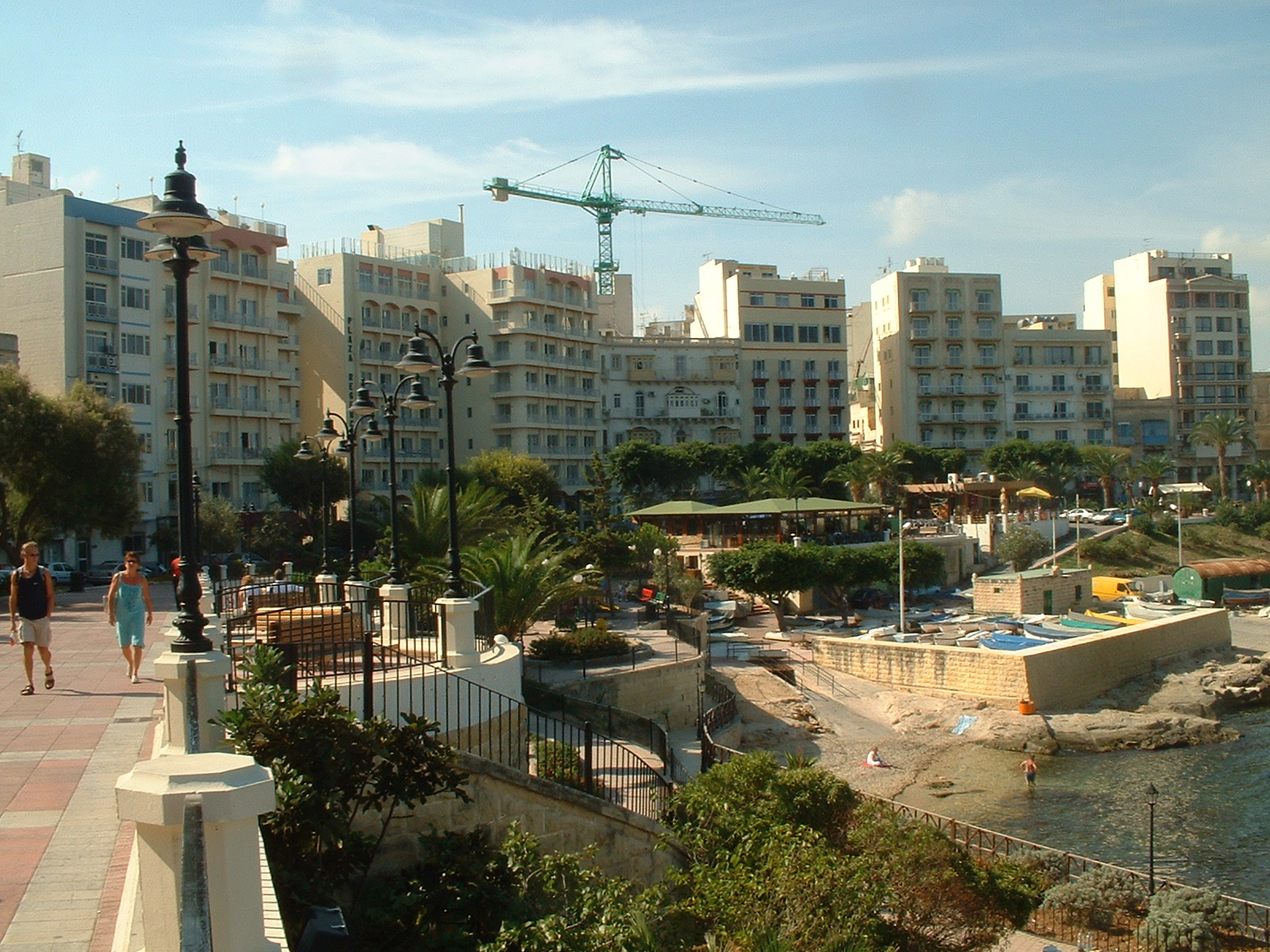
Independence Garden

- George Bonello du Puis Garden (Ġnien George Bonello du Puis)
- Independence Garden (Ġnien l-Indipendenza)

== Tarxien ==
- Joan's Garden (Ġnien Joan)
- Mark Farrugia Garden (Ġnien Mark Farrugia)
- Tarxien Local Council Garden (Ġnien Kunsill Lokali Tarxien)

== Valletta ==
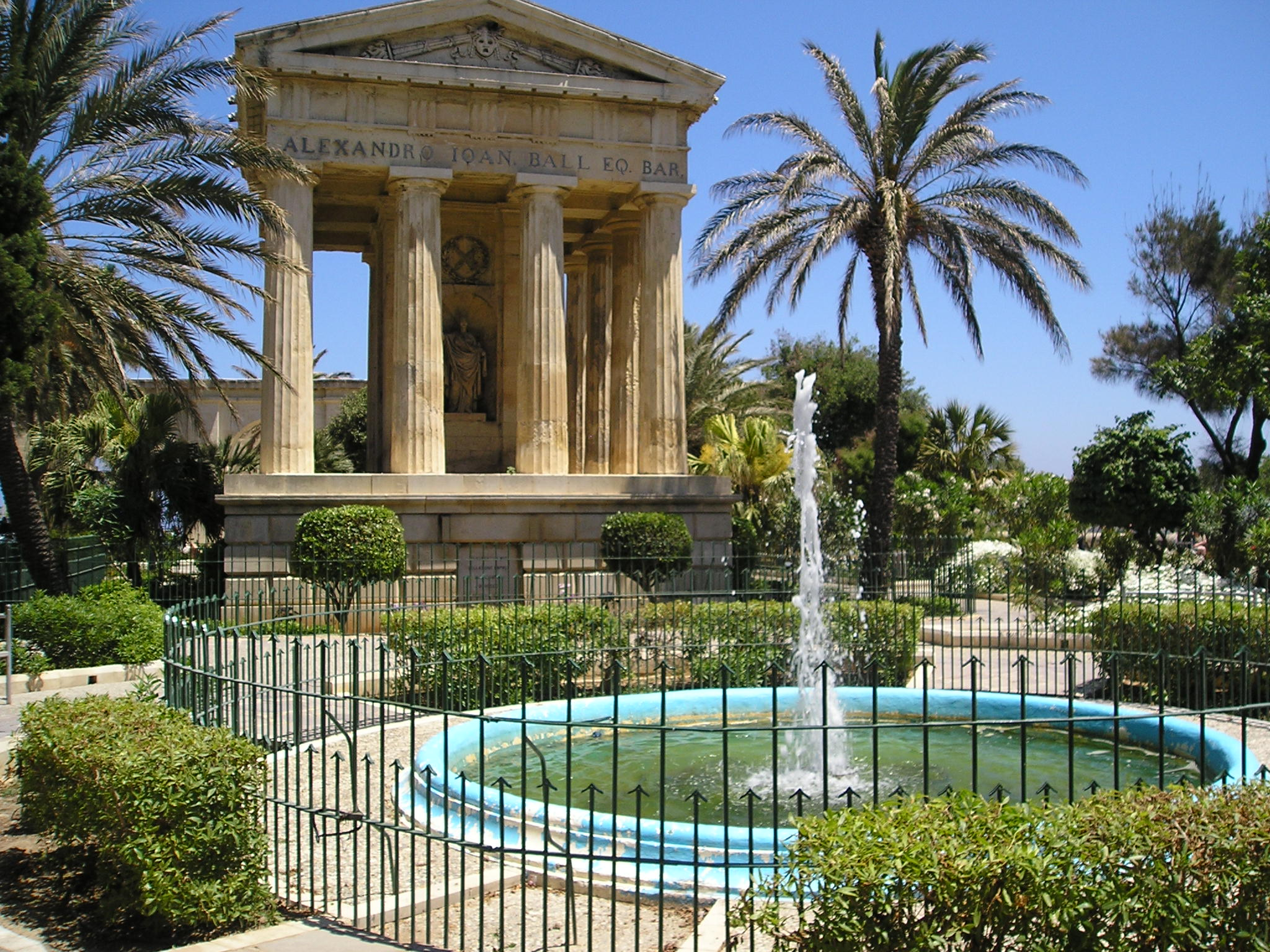
Lower Barrakka Gardens

- Hastings Gardens (Ġnien ta' Hastings)
- Lower Barrakka Gardens (Il-Barrakka t'Isfel)
- Upper Barrakka Gardens (Il-Barrakka ta' Fuq)

== Victoria ==
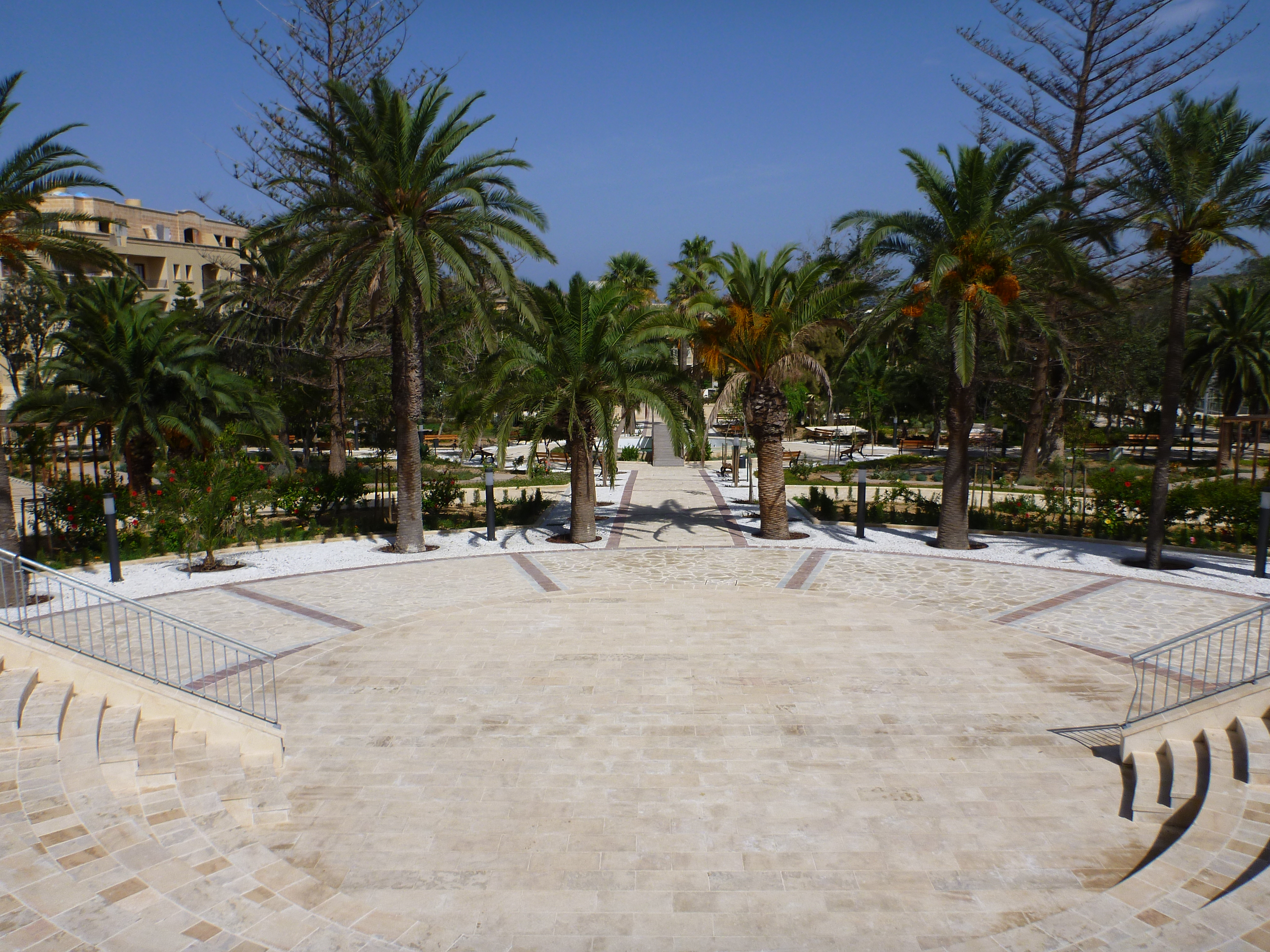
Villa Rundle Gardens

- Villa Rundle

== Xagħra ==
- European Council Garden (Ġnien il-Kunsill tal-Ewropa)

== Xewkija ==
- Castelvenere Garden (Ġnien Castelvenere)
- Council Garden (Ġnien il-Kunsill)

== Żabbar ==
- Żabbar Playing Field (Bandli Żabbar)
- Il-Masġar taż-Żebbuġ
- Wesgħa quddiem Bieb is-Sultan

== Żebbuġ, Gozo ==
- Qbajjar Gardens (Ġnien il-Qbajjar)

== Żejtun ==
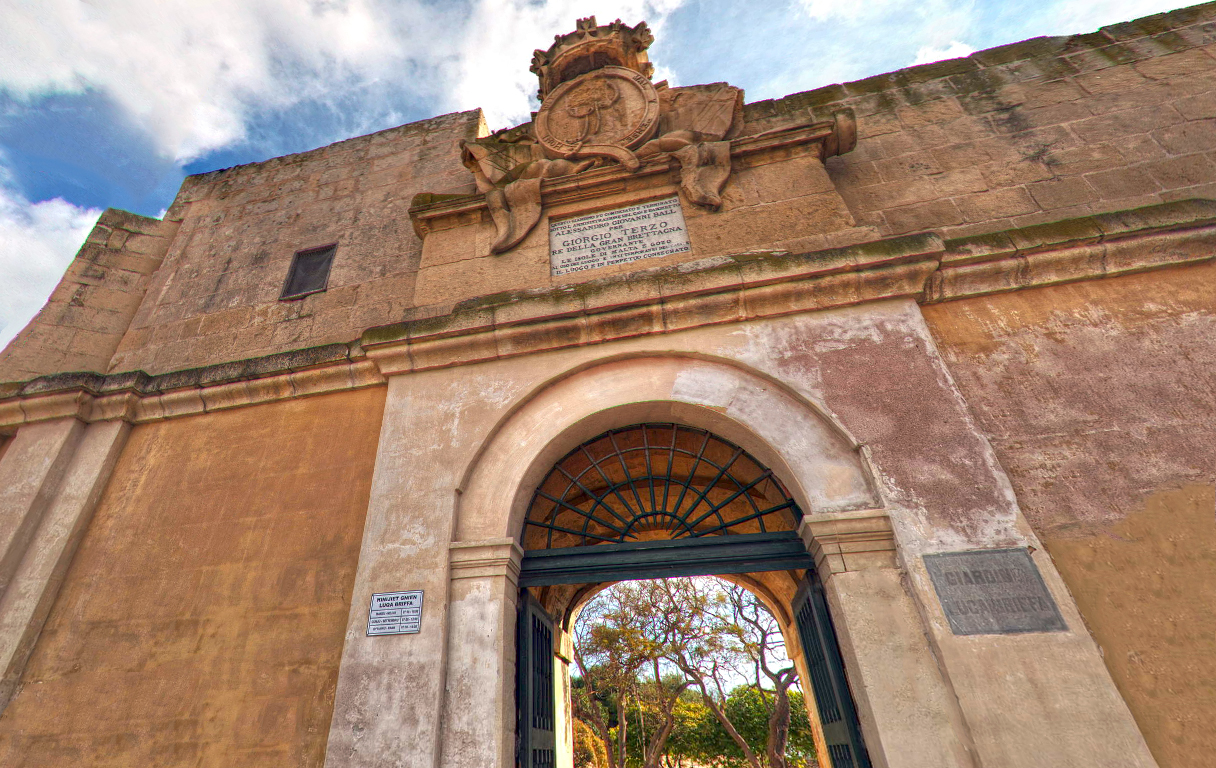
Luqa Briffa Gardens

- Circles' Garden (Ġnien iċ-Ċrieki)
- Ġebel San Martin Garden (Ġnien Ġebel San Martin)
- Luqa Briffa Garden (Ġnien Luqa Briffa) - also known as the Commander's Garden (Ġnien tal-Kmand)
- Mikiel Anton Vassalli Garden (Ġnien Mikiel Anton Vassalli)
- Rainbow's Garden (Ġnien il-Qawsalla)
- St. Gregory's Garden (Ġnien San Girgor)
- Ta' Brejgu Garden (Ġnien Ta' Brejġu)
- Youth Garden (Ġnien iż-Żgħożija)

== Żurrieq ==
- Belvedere Garden (Ġnien Belvedere)
- European Council Garden (Ġnien il-Kunsill tal-Ewropa)
- Żurrieq's Children Garden (Ġnien Tfal taż-Żurrieq)
