= Karl Chircop =

Maltese politician and doctor

Member of Parliament
- In office 5 December 1996 – 12 October 2008
- Succeeded by: Gino Cauchi

Personal details
- Born: 7 August 1965 Ħ'Attard, Malta
- Died: 12 October 2008 (aged 43) London, United Kingdom
- Party: Labour (PL)
- Spouse: Adriana
- Children: 4
- Profession: Medical Doctor
- Website: www.mlp.org.mt

Karl Chircop (7 August 1965 – 12 October 2008) was a family doctor and Maltese politician. He was Member of Parliament in the House of Representatives of Malta of the Malta Labour Party (Partit Laburista) from 1996 to 2008, served as shadow Minister for post, Social Policy, and Health.

== Political career ==
Karl Chircop started off in the Labour Party as a member of the youth section of the Labour Party, the Labour Youth Forum (Forum Żgħażagħ Laburisti). He contested the general elections for the first time in 1996 on the 4th district (Gudja, Għaxaq, Marsa, Paola, Santa Luċija, Tarxien). He became a member of parliament in 1996 at age 31, and continued to be elected in parliament ever since.

During the Labour government of 1996–98 he was appointed in the Council of Europe in the committee of Social affairs and Economic affairs, where he served as leader of the Maltese delegation.

== Death ==
Dr Chircop turned 43 on 7 August 2008. A few days later he suffered a cerebral haemorrhage and was rushed to Mater Dei Hospital, from where he was later taken to London's National Hospital for Neurology. On 12 October 2008, soon after doctors completed tests to confirm the compatibility of his donated organs, life support was disconnected. He had been confirmed clinically dead since the previous Sunday afternoon. The funeral held on Saturday 18 October 2008, at Christ the King Parish Church, Paola, Malta.
