= Cauchy (disambiguation) =

Cauchy primarily refers to Augustin-Louis Cauchy (1789-1857), French mathematician.

Cauchy may also refer to:

== People ==
- Daniel Cauchy (1930–2020), French actor and producer
- Louis François Cauchy (1760–1848), French government official and the father of the mathematician
- Cauchy Muamba (born 1987), Congolese Canadian football player

== Places ==
- Cauchy (crater), a small lunar impact crater
- Cauchy-à-la-Tour, a commune in Hauts-de-France, France
- Estrée-Cauchy, a commune in Hauts-de-France, France
- Sauchy-Cauchy, a commune in Hauts-de-France, France

== See also ==
- Cauchi, a Maltese surname
- List of things named after Augustin-Louis Cauchy
