= Gino Cauchi =

Maltese politician

The Honourable Gino Cauchi MP

Member of Parliament
- Incumbent
- Assumed office 31 October 2008
- Preceded by: Karl Chircop

Personal details
- Born: 25 January 1968 (age 58) Paola, Malta
- Party: Labour (PL)
- Spouse: Louiselle nee Attard
- Children: Paula; Nicholas
- Profession: Sales and Marketing Manager
- Website: www.mlp.org.mt www.ginocauchi.com

Gino Cauchi (born 25 January 1968 in Paola) is a Sales and Marketing Manager in One Productions Ltd and a Maltese politician. He was a member of parliament in the House of Representatives of Malta of the Labour Party (Partit Laburista).

== Personal life and family ==
Cauchi was born in Paola and lives in Pembroke. He is married to Louiselle née Attard, and they have two children: Paula and Nicholas.

== Career at One Productions ==
He joined One Productions as Head of News and Current Affairs in 2000. Took over as Head of Sales and Marketing in 2005. Currently he is a Communication Executive within the Labour Party.

== Journalism ==
Cauchi worked as a journalist with the Public Broadcasting Authority (The National Television Station in Malta) from 1985 till 2000. He later worked as a journalist with Party's television and radio station, Super One Radio and took on a similar role at Super One TV., becoming the station's head of news in 2000. He was also editor of Party's media, One Productions Ltd, between 2000 and 2005.

== Politics ==
Gino was as a member of the youth section of the Labour Party, the Socialist Youth Forum (Ghaqda Żgħażagħ Socjalisti) in the committee of Santa Lucija. From 1995 till 1998 he had served as a mayor of Pembroke. He later served as Education Secretary and Acting President of the local committee of Pembroke and he was involved in the 10th district of Labour Party. For these last three years, he contested the elections to represent the delegates in Labour Party General Conference. He produced the document of the social and economic of the Labour Party. On 31 October 2008, Cauchi was casually elected as a member of parliament following the death of Karl Chircop.
