= Cauchie =

Cauchie is a surname. Notable people with the surname include:

- Alfred Cauchie (1860–1922), Belgian professor of history
- Antoine Cauchie (c. 1535 – c. 1600), French grammarian
- Idès Cauchie (born 1949), Belgian politician
- Maurice Cauchie (1882–1963), French musicologist
- Paul Cauchie (1875–1952), Belgian architect, painter and decorator, designer of the Cauchie House in Brussels

== See also ==
- La Cauchie, a commune in Pas-de-Calais, Hauts-de-France, France
