= Tony Cauchi =

Maltese footballer (1935–2020)

Tony Cauchi (2 May 1935 – 12 April 2020) was a Maltese football player and manager. A forward, he spent most of his career with Floriana, winning several national honours. He played nine games for the Malta national team between 1957 and 1961, scoring their first goal in their debut game. He later managed several clubs.

== Club career ==
Born in Floriana, Cauchi spent 15 years with his hometown club. He was converted from goalkeeper to centre forward in 1950, and was chosen for the Malta Football Association's amateur team in 1952–53 while still a youth. On 30 November 1952, he made his Maltese Premier League debut against Birkirkara, making one more appearance as his team won the league.

Cauchi played 226 games and scored 175 goals for Floriana, and his honours included four Maltese Premier League titles and six Maltese FA Trophy titles. He was the league's top scorer twice, and occasionally filled in as an emergency goalkeeper. His final season as a player was as player-manager of Lija Athletic in 1967–68, and he later coached Qormi, Rabat Ajax, Mosta, Żejtun Corinthians, Naxxar Lions, Marsaxlokk and Żebbuġ Rangers.

== International career ==
Cauchi played in Malta's first international match, a 3–2 friendly loss at home to Austria on 24 February 1957, and scored the country's first goal. He ended his international career with nine caps and two goals, with his final game being a 1–1 draw with Norway on 5 November 1961.

== Personal life ==
Cauchi's son Denis Cauchi was also an international footballer. Tony Cauchi died on 12 April 2020, aged 84.
