= Fgura District Park =

Park in Fgura, Malta

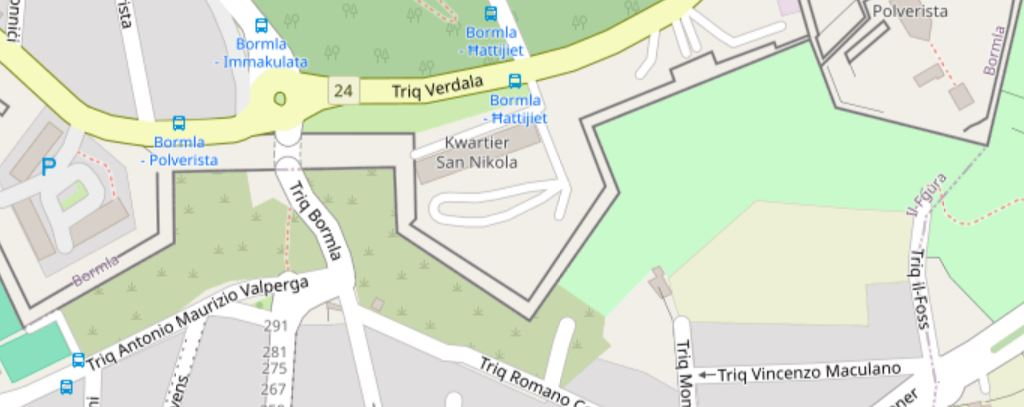
- Location: Fgura, Malta
- Coordinates: 35°52′32″N 14°31′25″E
- Area: 52,000 m^{2} (560,000 sq ft)
- Status: planned

The Fgura District Park is a planned park in Fgura, Malta, at the foot of the Cottonera Lines, between the St.John's, St.Nicholas' and St.Clement's bastions.

The area, until now left untended, is in continuity with Wied Blandun and with Park San Klement in Zabbar, as well as with the Ġnien Kottoner in Bormla, across the Cottonera Lines.

The initiative by Project Green aims at providing a public recreational green area for the town of Fgura.

The District Park spans approximately 52,000 square meters, making it one of the largest green spaces in the region.

To ensure community engagement, in early 2024, Project Green organized a placemaking session with forty youths from Fgura, who collaborated with architects to design elements of the park. This participatory approach ensured that the park reflects the aspirations and needs of the local community.

The master plan for the park includes a diverse range of facilities:

- Walking and jogging tracks designed to promote physical activity and well-being.
- Cycling paths encouraging sustainable transportation and recreation.
- Adventure activities such as zip lines and climbing rigs.
- Sports facilities including a multi-purpose sports ground, fitness center, and beach volleyball area.
- Recreational areas including a skate park, dog park, children's play area, picnic zones, and a dirt race track.

These amenities aim to cater to a wide demographic, from children and youths to adults and senior citizens, fostering a sense of community and promoting healthy lifestyles.

The development of Fgura District Park is part of a broader initiative to green urban spaces in Malta. By incorporating more trees and accessible spaces, the park contributes to environmental sustainability and enhances the aesthetic appeal of the area. The project also addresses the need for recreational spaces in densely populated urban settings, providing residents with a safe and inviting environment for leisure and social interaction.

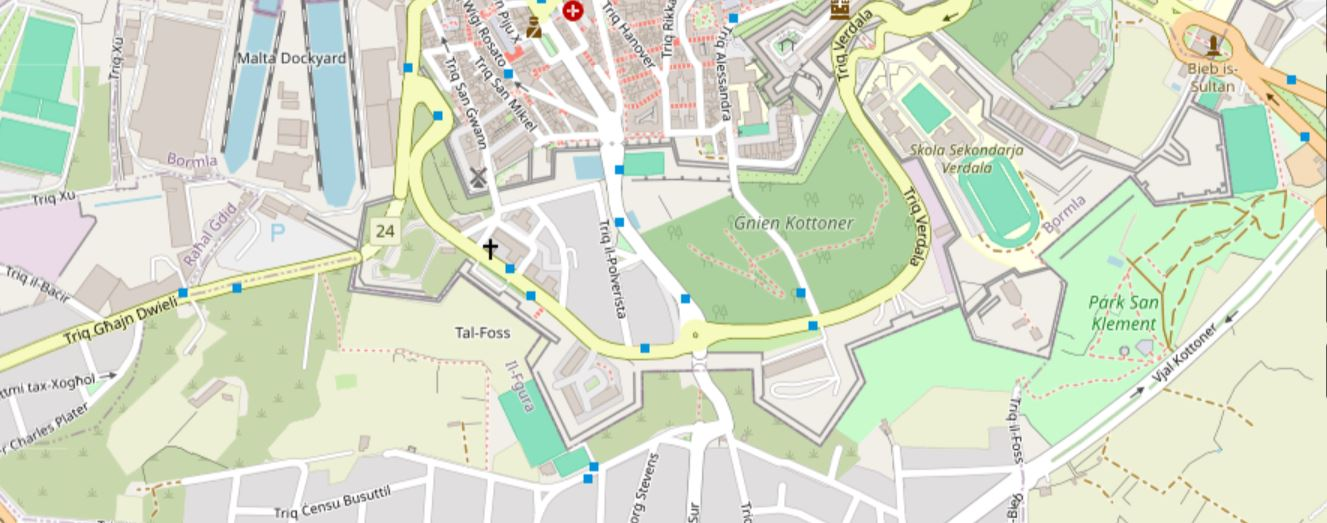
The "green belt" separating Bormla (north) from Fgura (south): Wied Blandun (left), Ġnien Kottoner (centre - north), the planned Fgura District Park (centre - south), Park San Klement (right) and the Zabbar fields (bottom right)

== External sources ==
- Project Description Statement, Fgura District Park, Project Green, September 2024
- Newsbook
