= Thomas Cauchi =

Maltese philosopher

- Born: Unknown; Malta
- Died: Unknown
- Occupation: Philosophy of Law

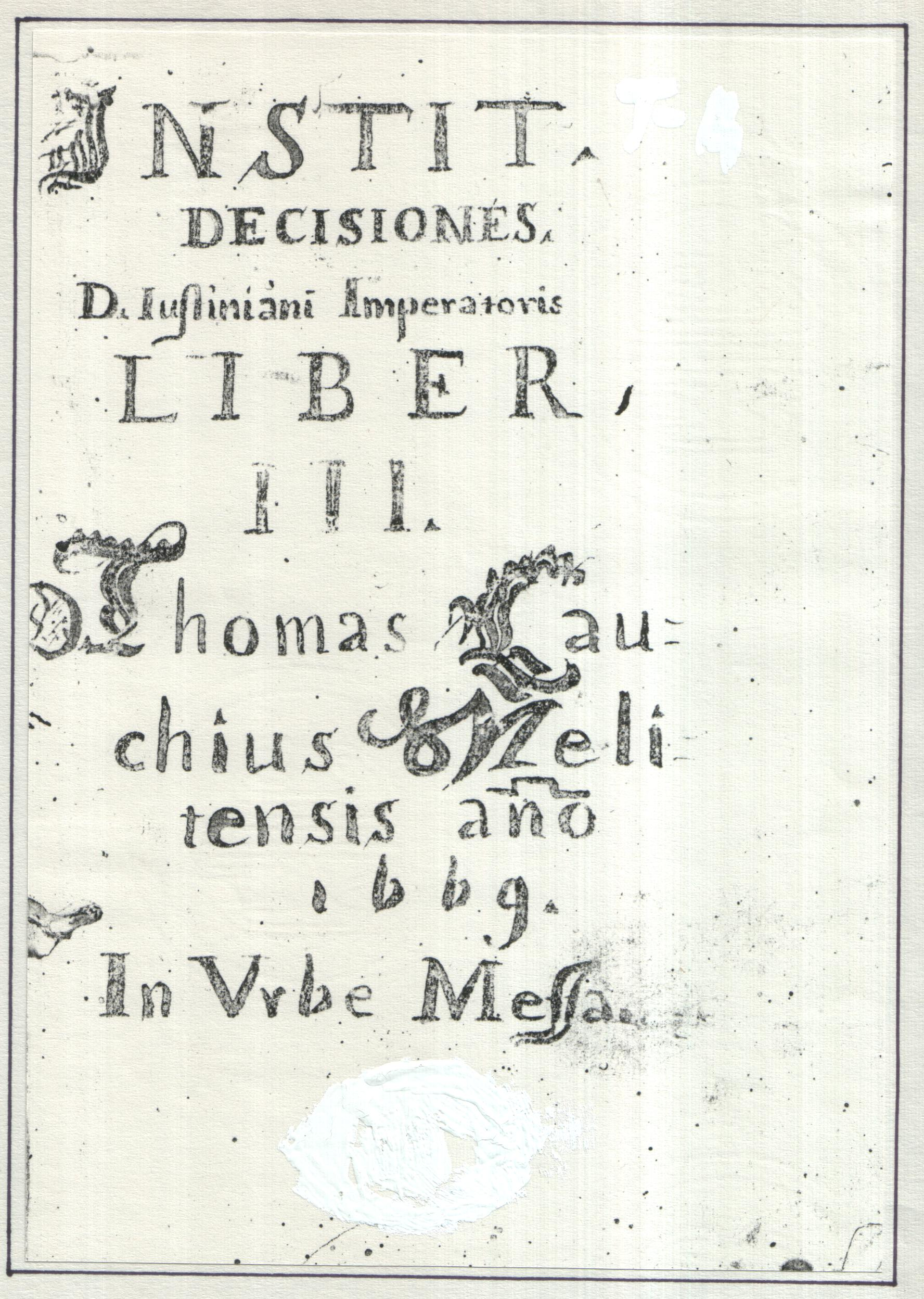
Thomas Cauchi's only extant work

Thomas Cauchi (17th century) was a minor Maltese philosopher who specialised in law.

== Life ==
Little is known about the private life of Thomas Cauchi. Neither his dates of birth and death nor his birthplace in Malta are identified as yet. He might have lectured at the Collegium Melitense see in Valletta. He surely lectured in Messina, Sicily. Unfortunately, most of the works of Cauchi are as yet lost. At least three are known to have existed, all dealing with the philosophy of law. Of these just one is still extant, which is the third volume of what is thought to have been a triad. Unfortunately, no known portrait of Cauchi is known to exist yet.

== Known works ==
Cauchi's only work which is still extant is Institutionum Decisiones D[ivi] Iustiniani Imperatoris (Teachings about the Conclusions of the Holy Emperor Justinian), written in 1699. The manuscript is held at the National Library of Malta, Valletta, and marked as MS. 1286#1. It contains fifty-four back to back folios, and is basically a philosophical commentary on Roman law. The content was part of Cauchi's corpus of lectures given at Messina, Sicily, in or before the date of its composition. The manuscript is divided into ‘Conclusions’ (each called a Decisio) and numbered paragraphs.

== Sources ==
- Mark Montebello, Il-Ktieb tal-Filosofija f’Malta (A Source Book of Philosophy in Malta), PIN Publications, Malta, 2001.

== See also ==
- Philosophy in Malta
