= Denis Cauchi =

Maltese footballer

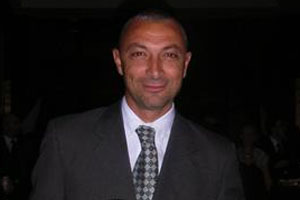

Personal information
- Full name: Denis Anthony Cauchi
- Date of birth: 15 January 1965 (age 61)
- Place of birth: Floriana, Malta
- Position: Defender

Senior career*
| Years | Team | Apps | (Gls) |
| 1982–1996 | Floriana | 182 | (17) |
| 1996 | Lija Athletic | 10 | (1) |
| 1996–1998 | Birkirkara | 50 | (3) |
| 1998–1999 | Rabat Ajax | 21 | (0) |
| 1999–2000 | Floriana | 15 | (0) |
| 2000–2001 | Marsa | 9 | (0) |
| 2001–2002 | Marsaxlokk | 28 | (1) |
| 2003 | Floriana | 5 | (0) |

International career
- Malta U18
- Malta U21
| 1986–1997 | Malta | 10 | (0) |
- * Club domestic league appearances and goals

Denis Anthony Cauchi (born 15 January 1965) is a Maltese former professional footballer who played for Floriana, Birkirkara, Rabat Ajax, Marsa, and Marsaxlokk. During his career, he played as a defender.

His father Tony Cauchi was a forward who scored Malta's first international goal, and later a manager.

== Honours ==
Floriana

- Maltese Premier League: 1992–93
- Maltese Cup: 1993, 1994; runner-up 1988, 1989
