= Chinese Garden of Serenity =

Public Chinese garden in Santa Luċija, Malta

Coordinates: 35°51′49.6″N 14°30′10.3″E

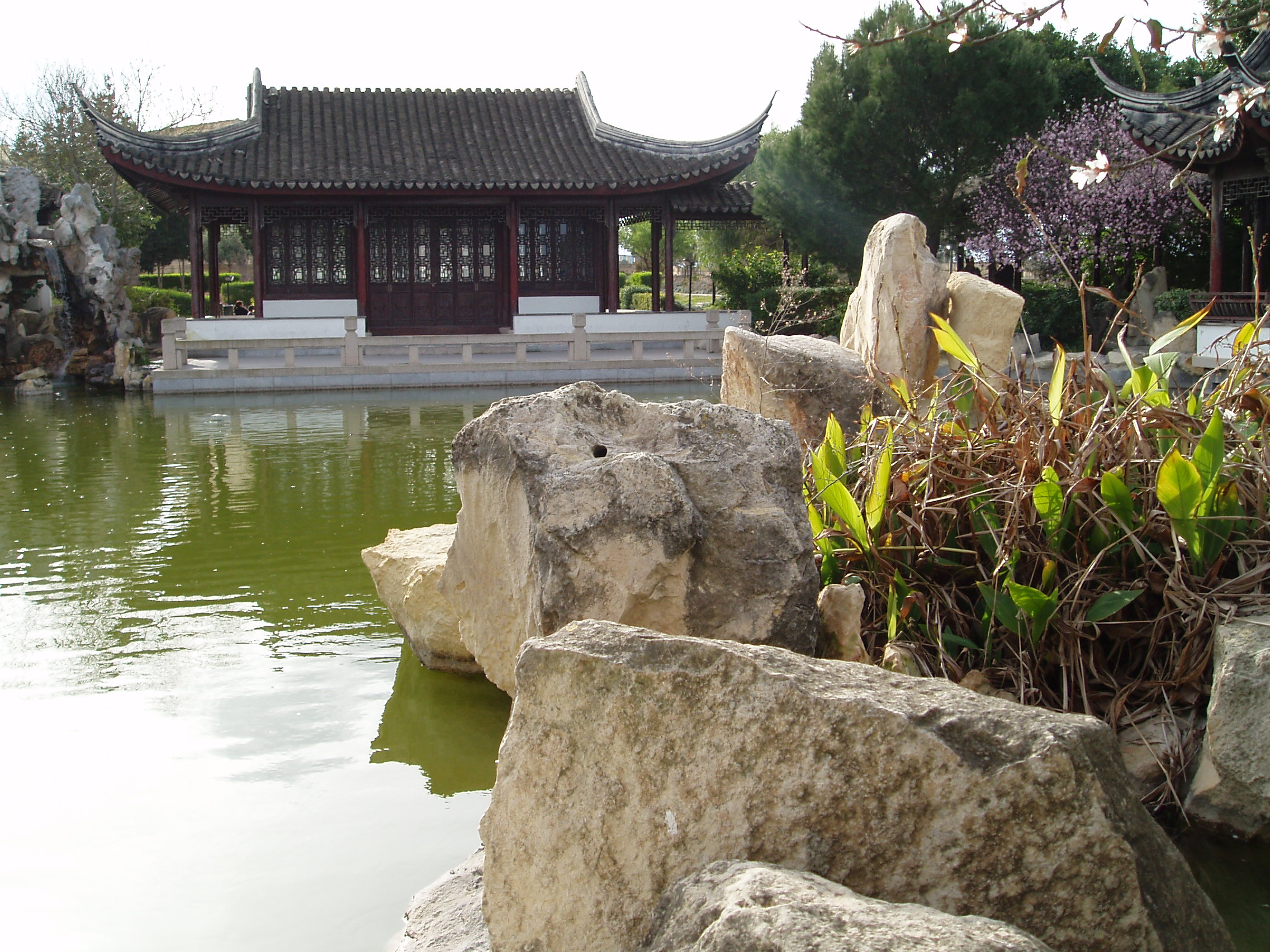
The great hall at the Chinese Garden of Serenity

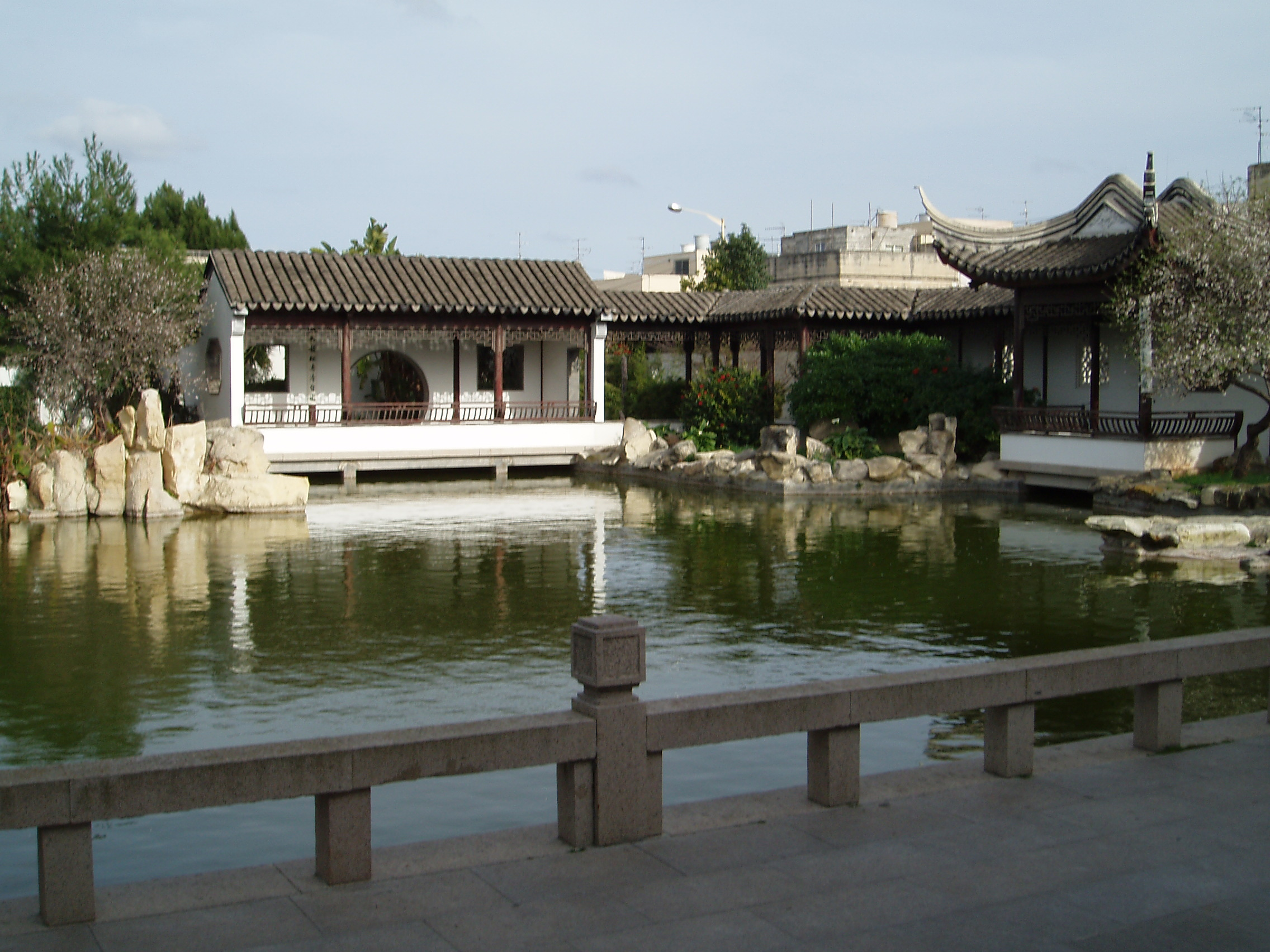
The opposite side of the great hall

The Chinese Garden of Serenity (Maltese: Ġnien is-Serenità or Ġnien taċ-Ċiniżi) is a public Chinese garden in Santa Luċija, Malta. Construction of the Garden of Serenity began in September 1996 as a gift to Malta from the People's Republic of China. The Prime Minister, Alfred Sant, opened it on 7 July 1997.

== Symbolism of the Chinese Garden ==
Chinese gardens are intended to encourage people to roam freely in their inner thoughts, and are designed around three principles. A garden must:

- Reflect the local environment by incorporating natural rather artificially elements—spontaneous and offering surprises rather than simple symmetry
- Represent a world of its own, complete in thought—with all phases of nature represented in the service of human thoughts — the yin and yang
- Fit the limits of its area while providing the element of surprise, the sense that there are other things to be seen

Rocks and water are the two important physical elements in a Chinese garden. Their combination forms the architecture and horticulture. Rocks and water symbolize the basis of nature, yin and yang, all that gives life. Rocks are the body of the world—the hills and valleys. The water is the world's spirit, providing oxygen, breath, the liquid clouds, blood running through the veins. The rocks symbolize all that is active, the work, the forces of work. The water symbolizes all that is contemplated—all that complements work, thought, freedom, silence, and reflection—in other words, serenity.
