= Santa Luċija =

- Local council
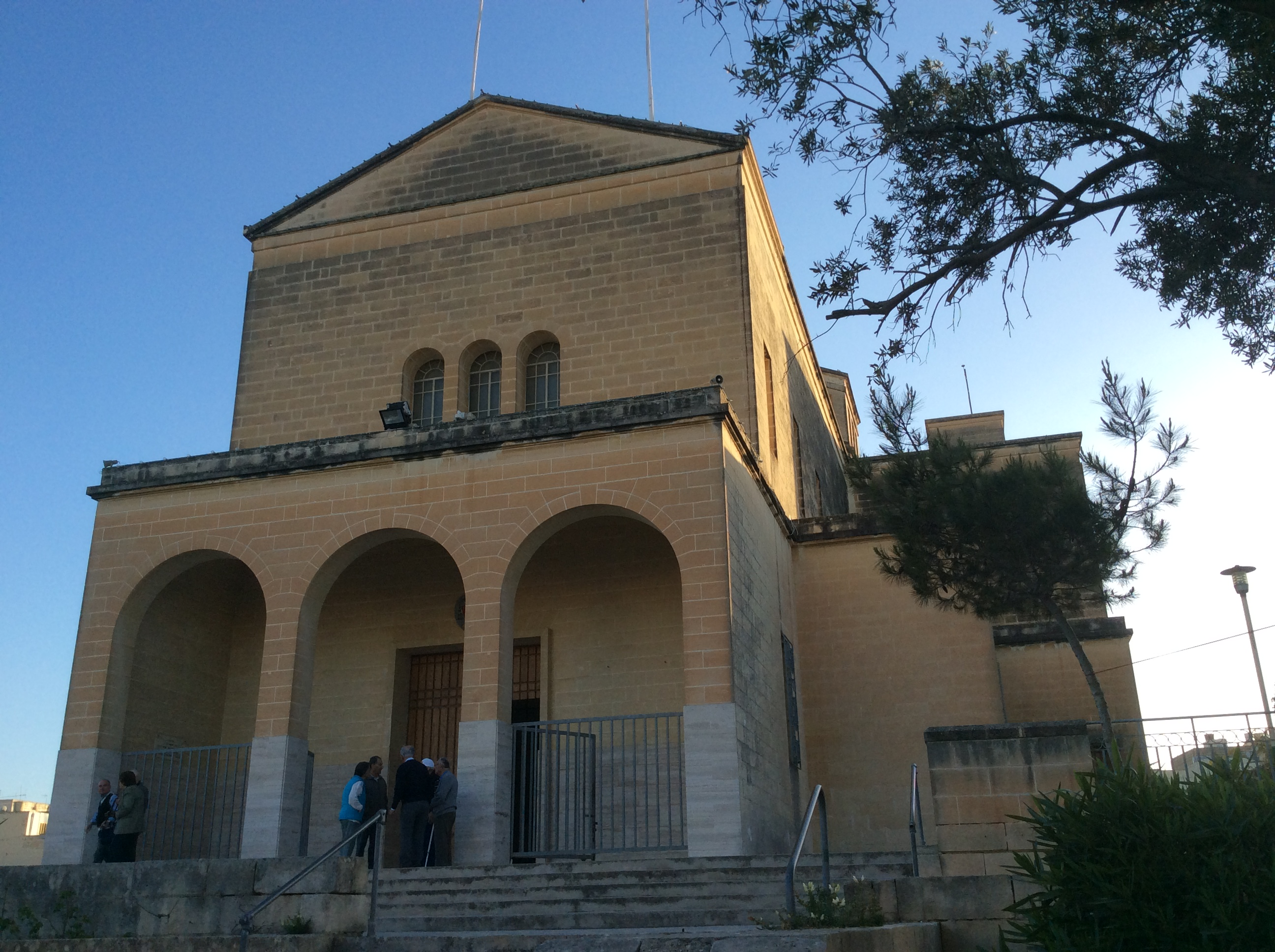
- Santa Luċija Parish Church

- Flag Coat of arms

- Coordinates: 35°51′45″N 14°30′16″E
- Country: Malta
- Region: Southern Region
- District: Southern Harbour District
- Borders: Gudja, Għaxaq, Luqa, Paola, Tarxien, Żejtun

Government
  - Mayor: Charmaine St John (PL)

Area
  - Total: 0.7 km^{2} (0.27 sq mi)

Population (Jul. 2024)
  - Total: 2,666
  - Density: 3,800/km^{2} (9,900/sq mi)
- Demonym: Ta' Santa Luċija
- Time zone: UTC+1 (CET)
  - Summer (DST): UTC+2 (CEST)
- Postal code: SLC
- Dialing code: 356
- ISO 3166 code: MT-53
- Patron saint: Pope Pius X
- Website: Official website

Santa Luċija (English: Saint Lucia) is a village in the Southern Region of Malta. It is one of the modern towns developed in Malta during the 20th century. By virtue of an article which appeared in Government Gazette of 7 July 1961, its location is defined as the area between Tal-Barrani (Tarxien By-Pass) and Luqa By-Pass. Santa Luċija was named after a 16th-century chapel located in the vicinity. The Parish Church is dedicated to Pope Pius X. It is home of the Chinese Garden of Serenity (a Chinese-built public garden). Located there is a hypogeum which was discovered in 1973.

The population of Santa Luċija was 2,666 in July 2024. This included 1,343 males and 1,323 females; 2,498 Maltese nationals and 168 foreign nationals.

== Attractions and places of interest ==
- Chinese Garden of Serenity, a Chinese traditional garden
- Sphere of Life, a commemorative monument by Paul Vella Critien
- Votive Column, a monument representing fertility

== Zones in Santa Luċija ==
- Bir-Ġurat
- Roqba
- Sqajjaq t'Isfel
- Ta' Garnaw
- Ta' Garriba
- Taċ-Ċagħki
- Tal-Lampat
- Tax-Xewk

== Main Roads ==
- Dawret it-Torri (Tower By-Pass)
- Triq Katarina Vitale (Catherine Vitale Street)
- Triq Marija DeDominicis (Maria De Dominicas Street)
- Triq Ħal-Luqa (Luqa Road)
- Triq il-Begonja (Begonia Street)
- Triq il-Pepprin (Poppies Street)
- Triq il-Prinjoli (Aleppo Pine Street)
- Triq Tal-Barrani (Tal-Barrani Road)
- Vjal l-Oleandri (Oleandri Avenue)

== Twin towns – sister cities ==
Santa Luċija is twinned with:

- Carlentini, Italy
- Gabiano, Italy
- Gusu District, China
