= Karin Grech Garden =

Public garden and playing field in San Ġwann, Malta

Karen Grech Garden
- Karen Grech Playing Field
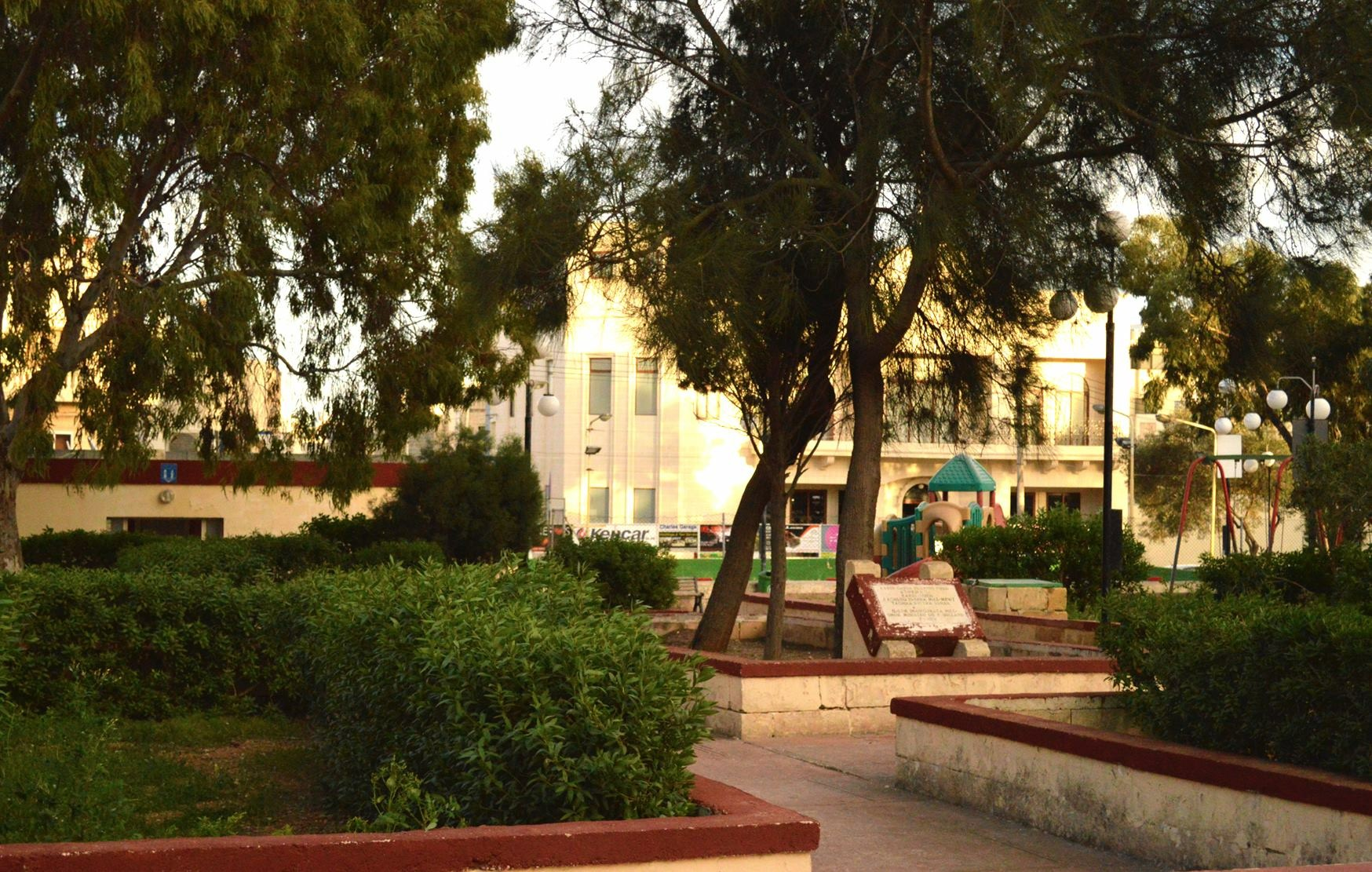
- View of the garden and playing field
- Interactive map of Karen Grech Garden
- Type: Garden
- Location: San Ġwann, Malta
- Coordinates: 35°54′29.52″N 14°28′35.49″E
- Opened: 20th century
- Status: Intact, but total renovation is under plan

Karin Grech Garden (Maltese: Ġnien Karin Grech), officially Karin Grech Playing Field, is a public garden and playing field in San Ġwann, Malta. The garden is named after Karin Grech, a letterbomb victim.

== Location ==
Karin Grech Garden is located at Vjal Ir-Rihan (Rihan Road), at the front of San Ġwann Parish Church dedicated to Our Lady of Lourdes.

== History ==
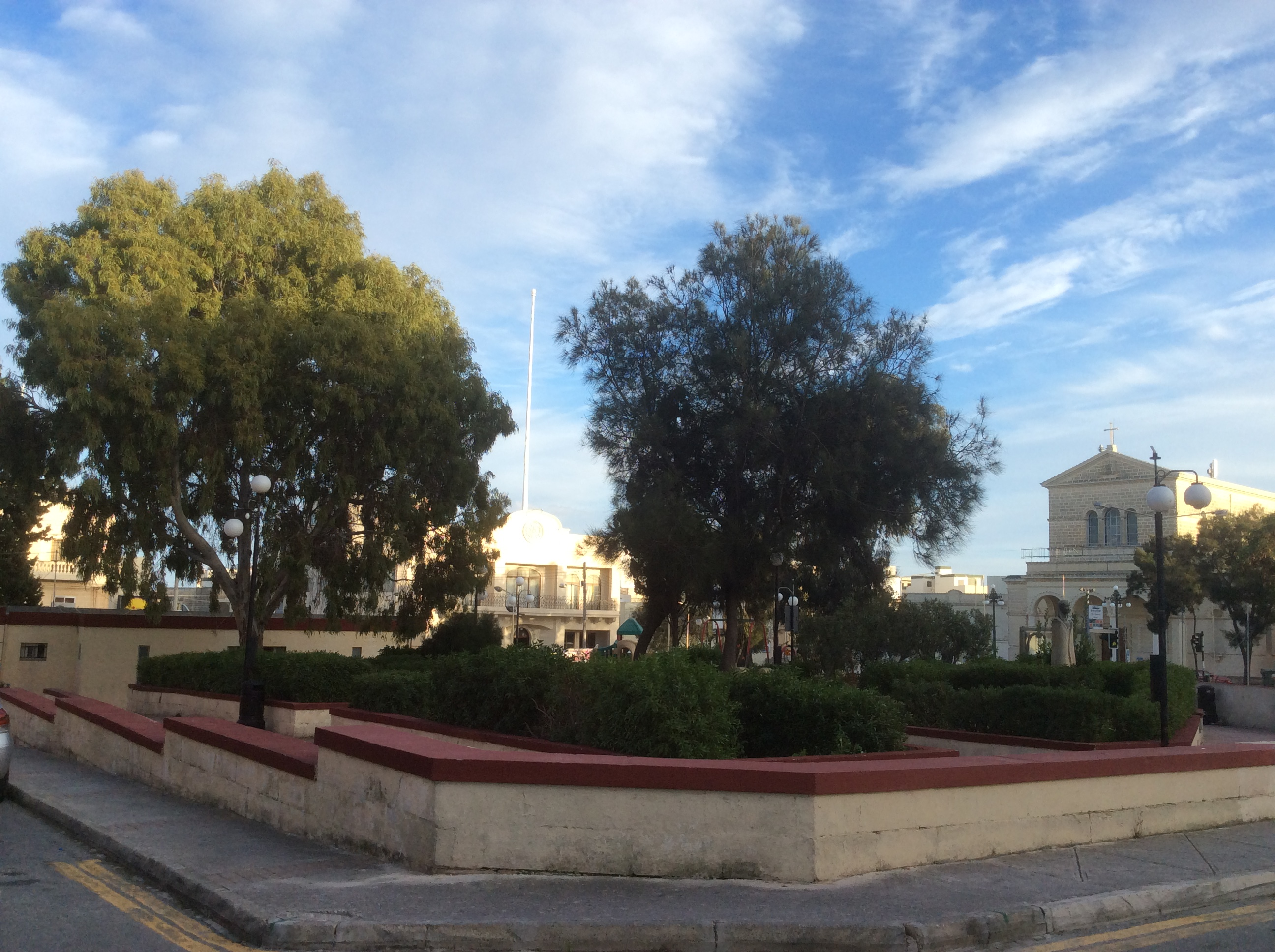
View of Karin Grech Garden

Before the creation of the garden the site consisted of natural fauna and flora, used as agricultural land from the times of the Romans until the middle of the 20th century, and since then rehabilitated as a public garden. Before, during and mainly after the Second World War several Maltese and British families flocked out of Valletta, the Three Cities of Cottonera and the surrounding suburbs and moved to San Gwann as a general consequence of the war; they moved out initially to avoid the bombardment targeting the Grand Harbour area.

With the growing population in San Ġwann, Maltese politicians and the community have pushed for a public garden to provide a recreational area. The garden was for many years the only urban public garden in San Ġwann, with other gardens having been created over time. The garden was built in the memory of Karin Maria Grech in 1981.

In March 2020, the playing field was damaged due to a car chase crash on site.

== Naming of the garden ==
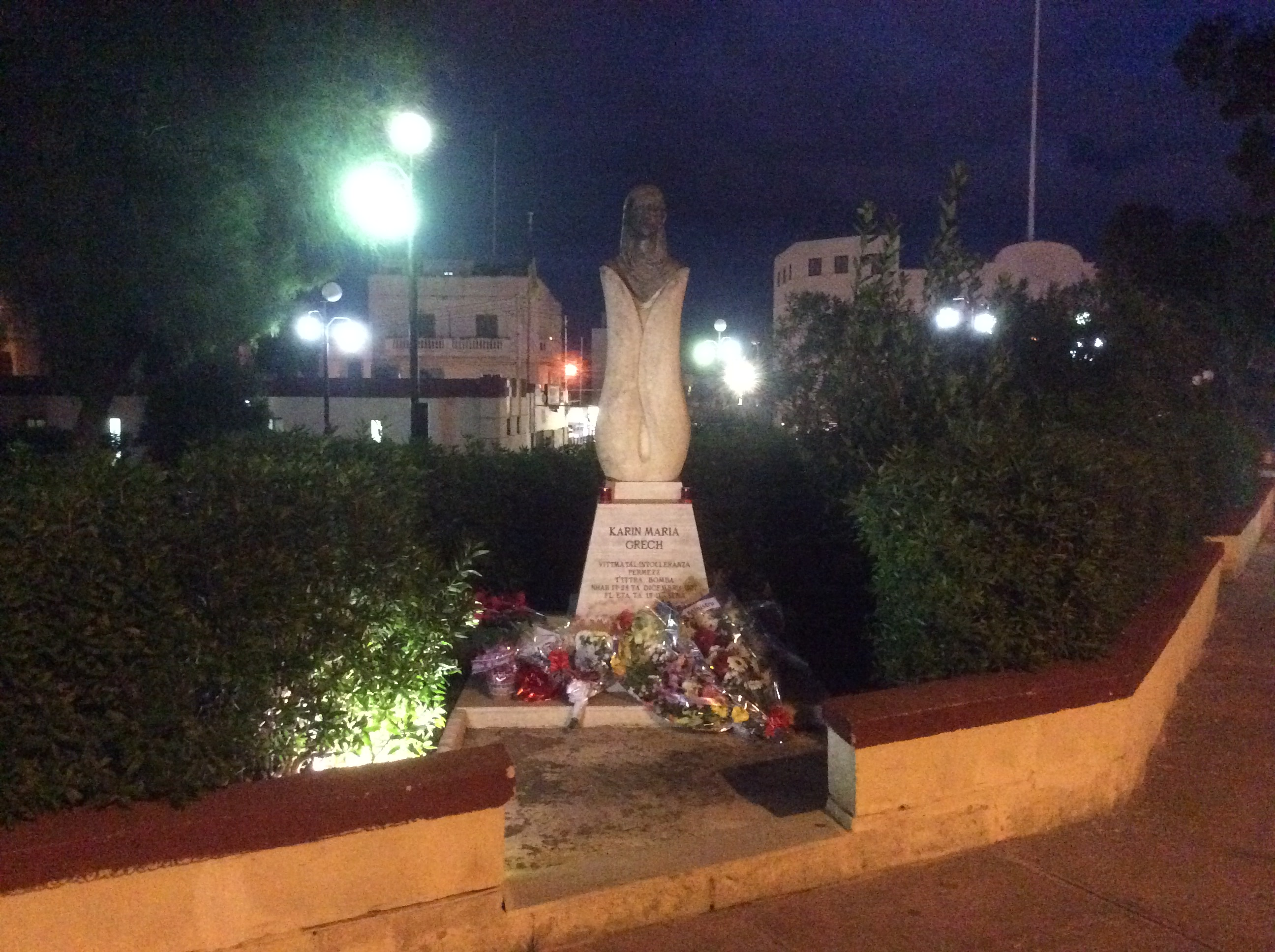
Flowers laid at the Karin Grech Monument

The garden was initially referred to simply as il-gnien (the garden) for some time, before being named the Karin Grech Playing Field (Ġnien Karin Grech). The garden was named after Karin Maria Grech, a victim of a letter bomb attack. The main feature of the garden is the monument of Karin Grech that is a commemoration monument of her being a victim in a political crisis concerning her father Edwin Grech, an obstetrician and gynaecologist at the time of the 1977 doctors' strike

A yearly event takes place in December, where flowers are laid at the monument.

== Plaques and Monuments ==
=== Official opening plaque ===
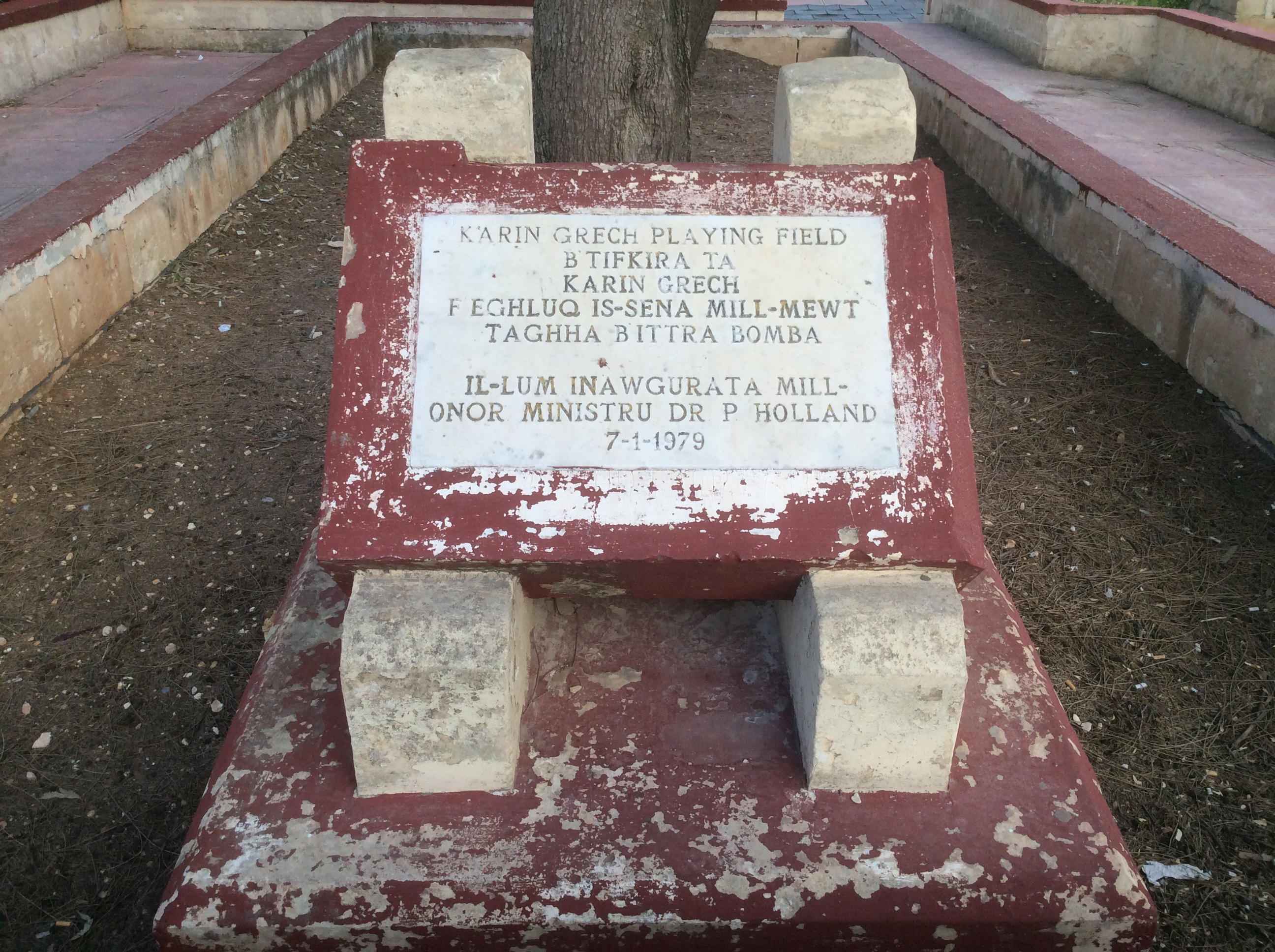
Plaque of the official opening of the garden

On the plaque commemorating the official opening is written:

Karin Grech Playing Field

B' Tifkira Ta' Karin Grech
F' Eghluq Is-Sena Mill-Mewt
Taghha B' Ittra Bomba

Il-Lum Inawgurata Mill-
Onor Ministru P. Holland
7-1-1979

=== The monument ===
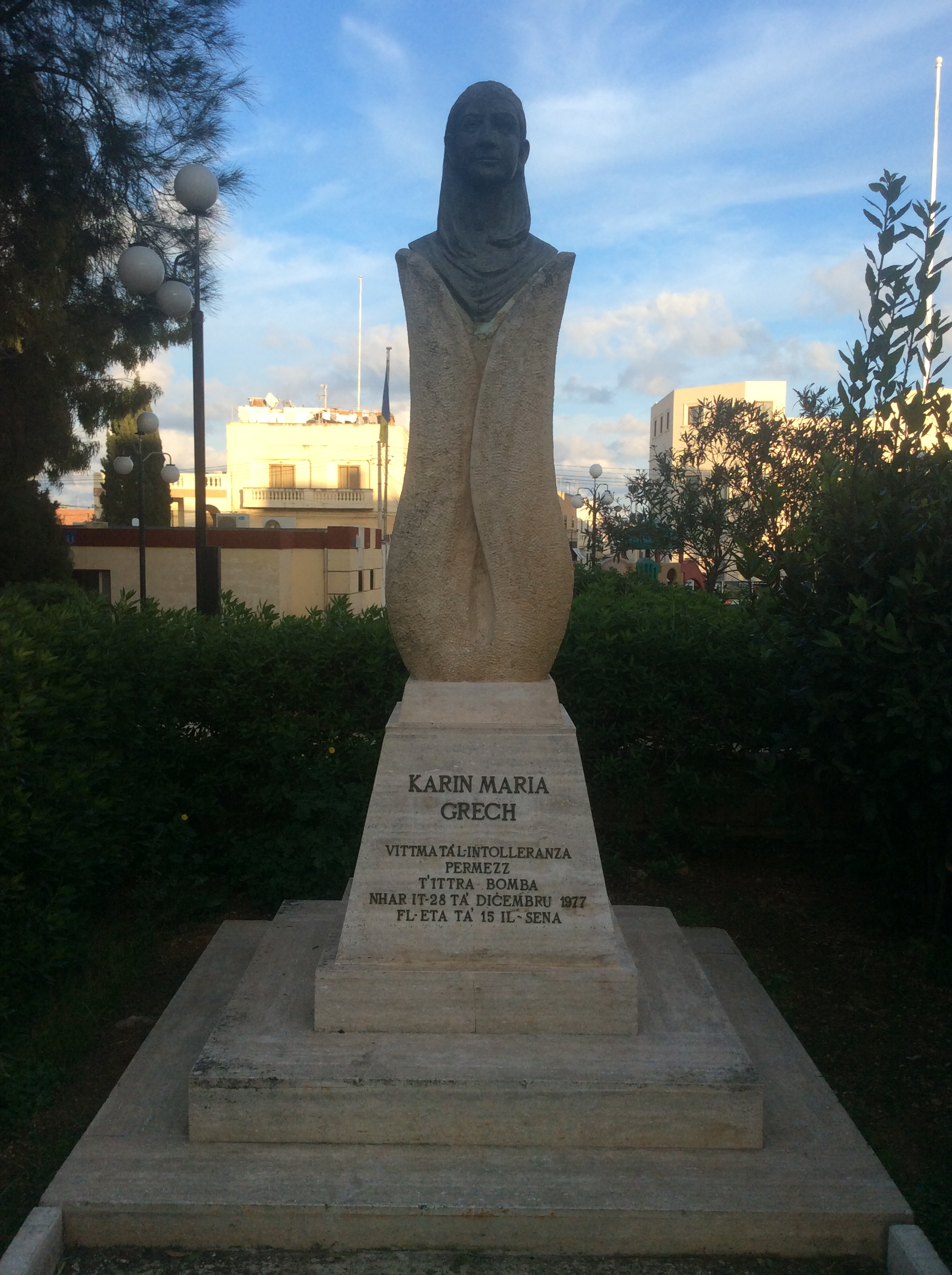
Close up of the Karin Grech Monument with inscription

On the Karin Maria Grech Monument is written:

Karin Maria

Grech

Vitma Ta' L-Intolleranza
Permezz
T'Ittra Bomba
Nhar It-28 Ta' Dicembru 1977
Fl-Eta' Ta' 15 Il-Sena

=== Modernization of the playing field ===
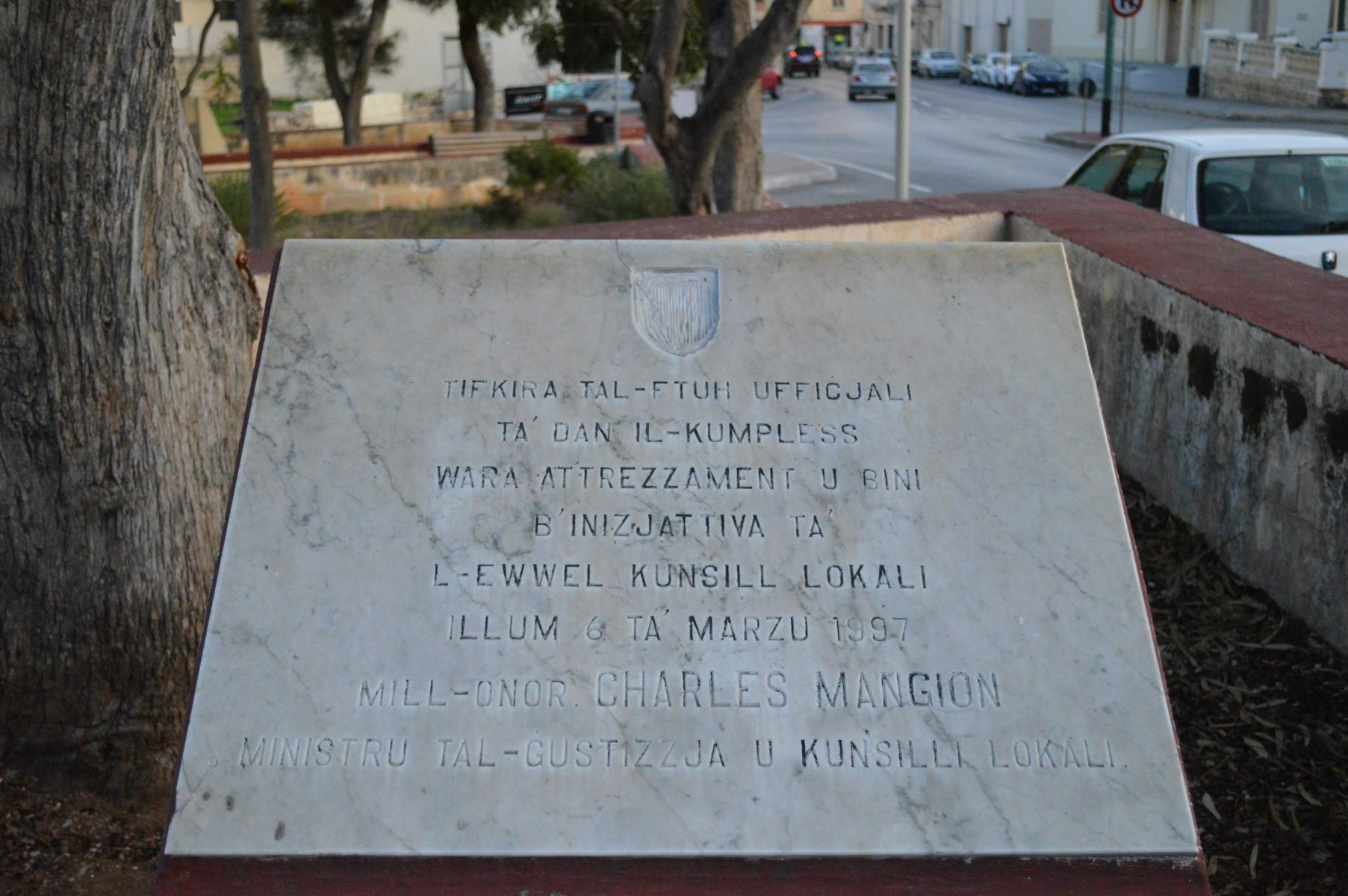
Plaque of the re-opening of Karin Grech Playing Field

Karin Grech Playing field underwent some refurbishment to modernise the playing facilities. On the re-opening of the playing a plaque was uncovered saying:

Tifkira tal-Ftuh Ufficjali

Ta' Dan Il-Kumpless
Wara Attrezzament U Bini
B' Inizjattiva Ta'
L-Ewwel Kunsill Lokali
Illum 9 Ta' Marzu 1997
Mill-Onor Charles Mangion
Ministru Tal-Gustizzja U Kunsilli Lokali

=== Freedom Day Monument ===
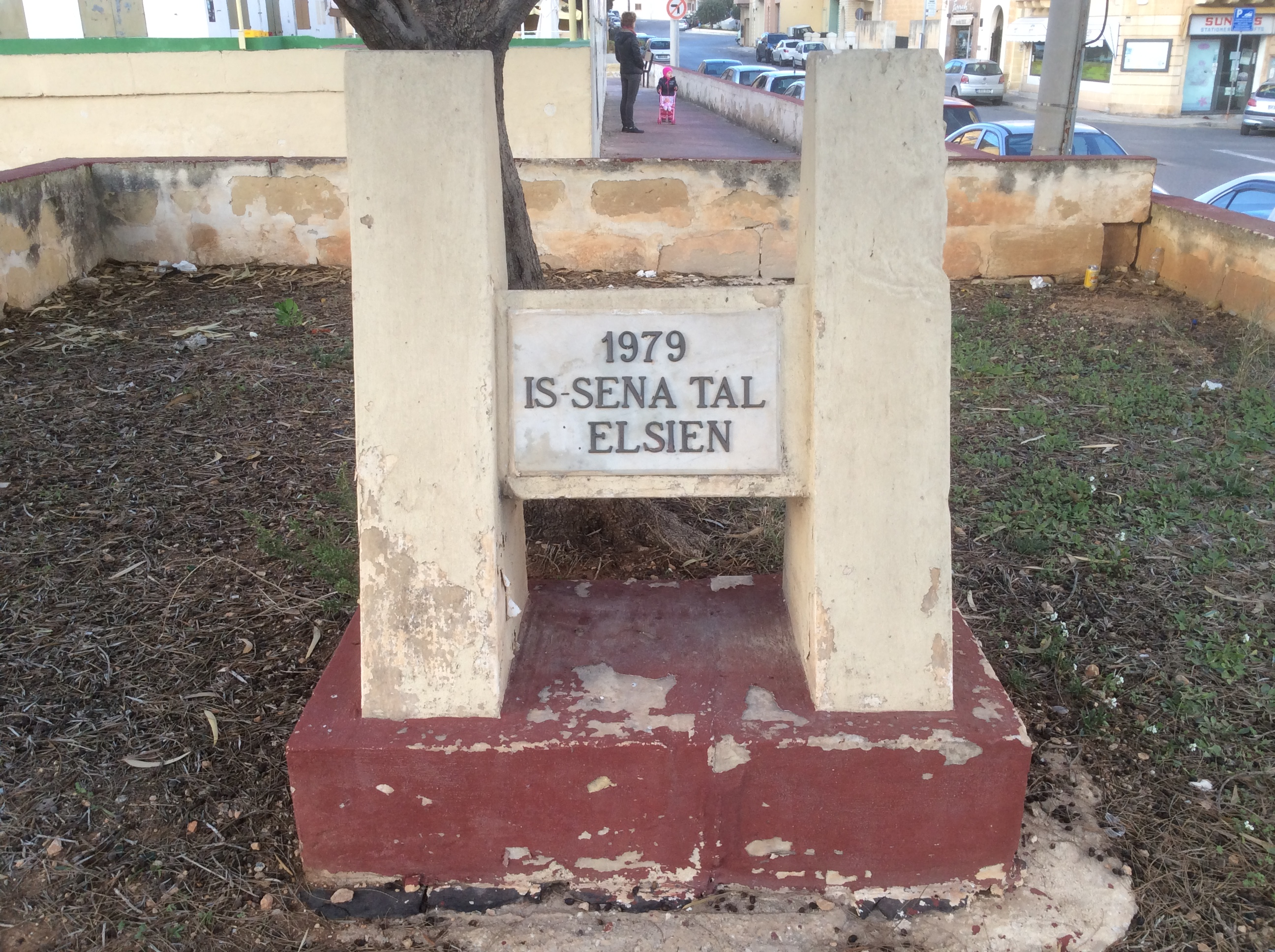
Freedom monument

Another monument at the garden commemorates Freedom day of 1979. On the plaque is written:

1979

Is-Sena Tal-
Helsien

== Architecture ==
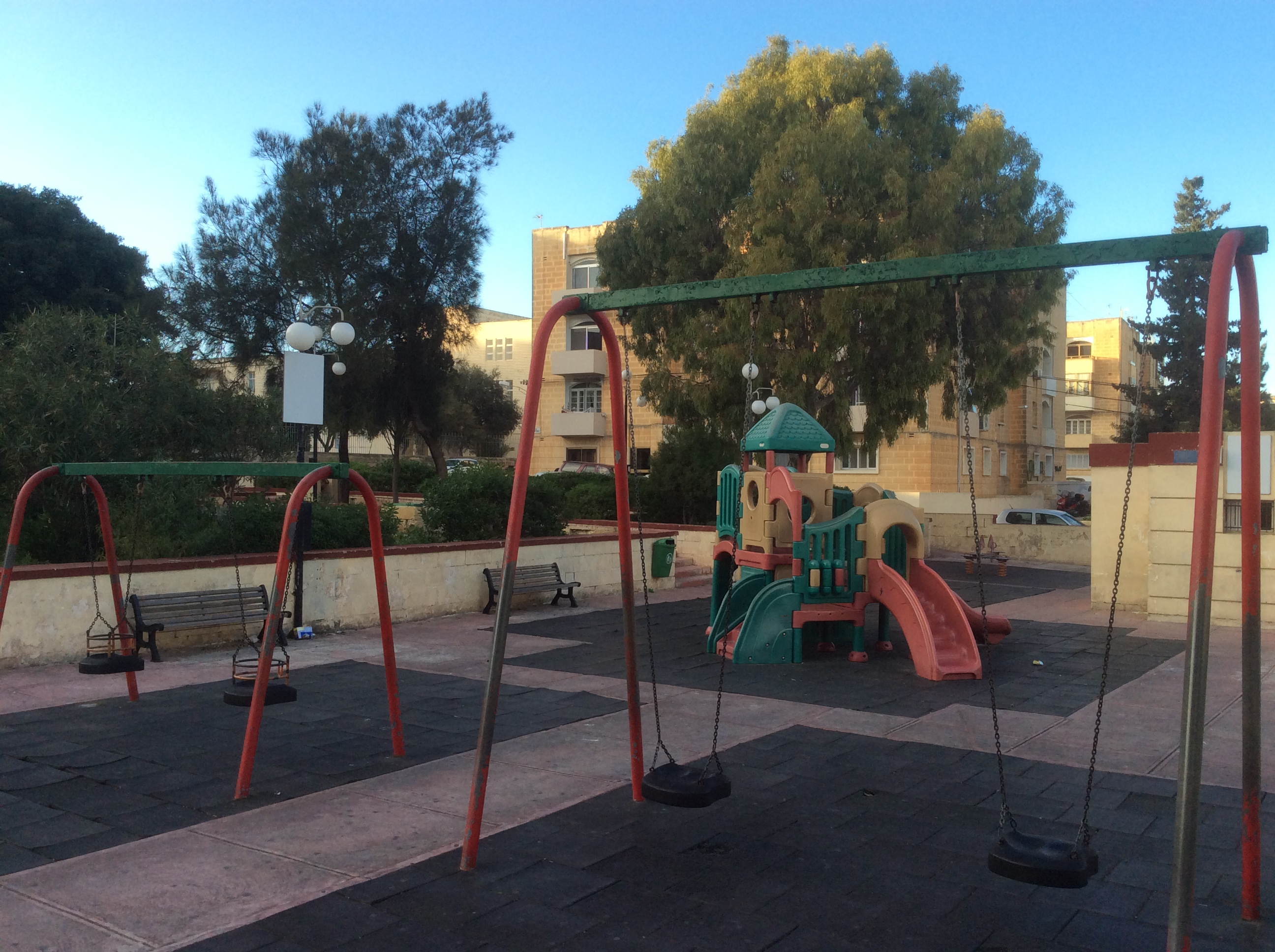
Karin Grech Playing Field

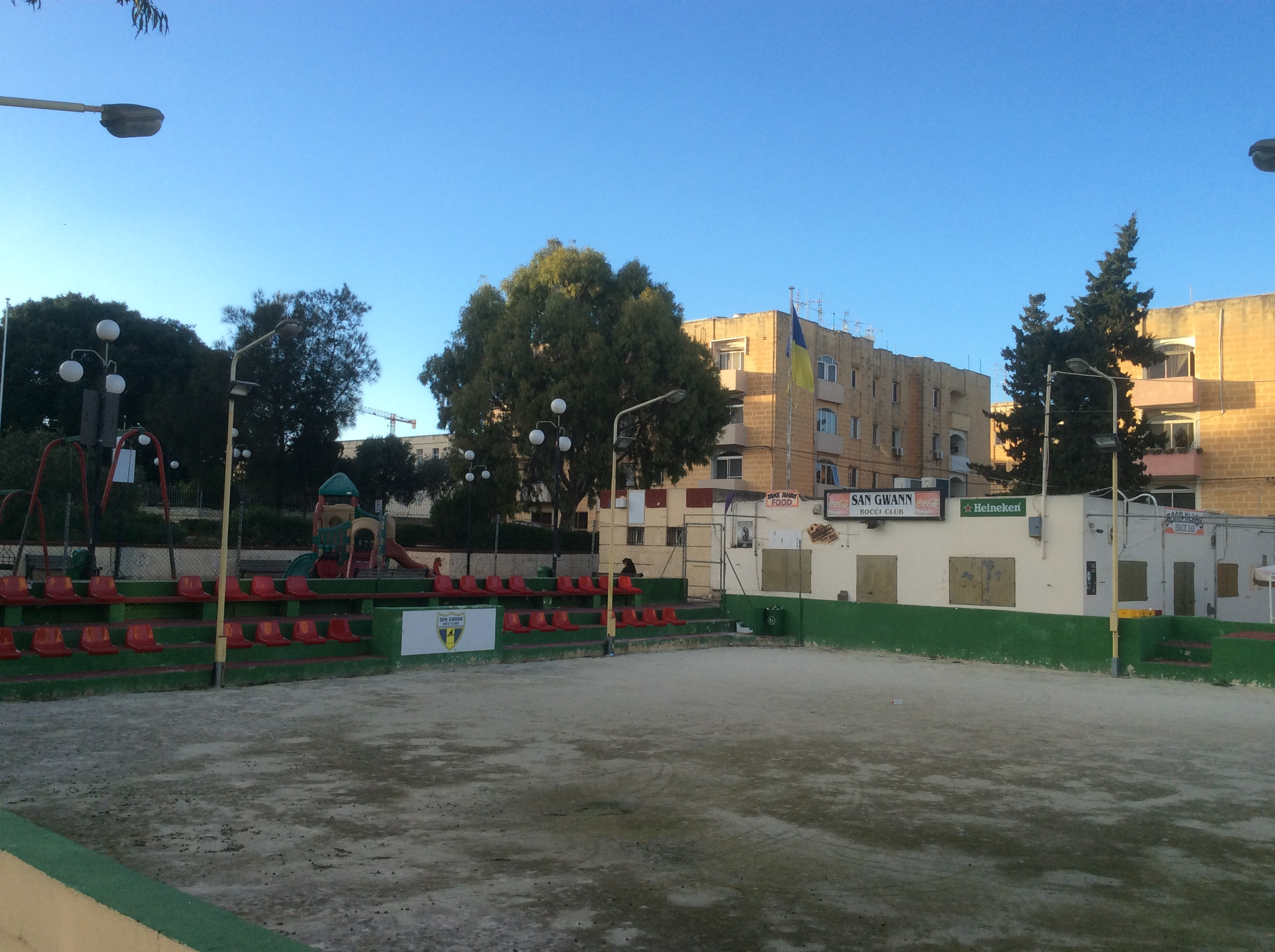
San Gwann Bocci Club

The present design of the garden is a modest design. The playing field was last refurbished by the San Ġwann Local Council who took care to adapt it with contextual modernisation.

== See also ==
- San Ġwann
- Tal-Mensija Cart Tracks - pre-historic cart ruts
- Ta' Ċieda Tower - Punic-Roman tower
- Ta' Xindi Farmhouse - Medieval farmhouse
- Castello Lanzun - Order of St. John
- Santa Margerita Chapel - Medieval Chapel
- Kolonna Eterna - Decorative garden monument
