= List of terrorist incidents in 1977 =

This is a timeline of incidents in 1977 that have been labelled as "terrorism" and are not believed to have been carried out by a government or its forces (see state terrorism and state-sponsored terrorism).

== Guidelines ==
- To be included, entries must be notable (have a stand-alone article) and described by a consensus of reliable sources as "terrorism".
- List entries must comply with the guidelines outlined in the manual of style under MOS:TERRORIST.
- Casualties figures in this list are the total casualties of the incident including immediate casualties and later casualties (such as people who succumbed to their wounds long after the attacks occurred).
- Casualties listed are the victims. Perpetrator casualties are listed separately (e.g. x (+y) indicate that x victims and y perpetrators were killed/injured).
- Casualty totals may be underestimated or unavailable due to a lack of information. A figure with a plus (+) sign indicates that at least that many people have died (e.g. 10+ indicates that at least 10 people have died) – the actual toll could be considerably higher. A figure with a plus (+) sign may also indicate that over that number of people are victims.
- If casualty figures are 20 or more, they will be shown in **bold**. In addition, figures for casualties more than 50 will also be **underlined**.
- Incidents are limited to one per location per day. If multiple attacks occur in the same place on the same day, they will be merged into a single incident.
- In addition to the guidelines above, the table also includes the following categories:

0 people were killed/injured by the incident.
1–19 people were killed/injured by the incident.
20–49 people were killed/injured by the incident.
50–99 people were killed/injured by the incident.
100+ people were killed/injured by the incident.

== List ==
Total incidents:

Date	Type	Dead	Injured	Location	Details	Perpetrator	Part of
January 4	Shooting	1(+1)	1	Buenos Aires, Argentina	While integrating a group that carried out a traffic control near San Justo, Buenos Aires Province, conscript Guillermo Félix Dimitri was shot dead by a high-speed car occupied by Ana María González and two men. The security forces repelled the attack and seriously wounded one of the men and the young woman, who died hours later in a shelter of the organization and his body was cremated by his companions.	ERP (Suspected)	Dirty War
January 8	Bombings	7	37	Moscow, USSR	Three explosions in Moscow. A bomb was detonated on a Moscow Metro train as it rolled into Kurskaya station. Seven people died and 33 were seriously injured.	Unknown	
January 24	Massacre	5	4	Madrid, Spain	Massacre of members of Workers' Commissions and Communist Party of Spain members at the Atocha railway station. Group calling itself Alianza Apostólica Anticomunista claimed responsibility and the men who carried out the shooting were linked the neo-fascist party Fuerza Nueva	Fuerza Nueva militants	Terrorism in Spain
February 18	Attempted bombing	0	0	Aeroparque Jorge Newbery, Argentina	The so-called "Gaviota Operation" was an assassination attempt against the dictator of Argentina, Jorge Rafael Videla, by the guerrilla organization People's Revolutionary Army, but by faults in the detonator, exploded after (when the airplane was in the air).	ERP	Dirty War
March 9–11	Hostage-taking	2	1	Washington, D.C., United States	12 gunmen from Nation of Islam splinter group "Hanafi" take over Washington City Hall, the headquarters of B'nai B'rith and the Islamic Center of Washington. They took 149 hostages and killed a radio journalist and a police officer and wounded future Washington mayor Marion Barry.	Hanafi movement	
March 27	Bombing that helped lead to a plane crash, due in part to the dangerous situation the terrorists created by overloading Tenerife North Airport by diverting aircraft there	583 (indirectly)	7 (directly) 61 (indirectly)	Canary Islands, Spain	A small bomb is detonated at the Gran Canaria Airport. Although only injuring one person, the consequent closure of the airport and the resulting confusion led to the deadliest aircraft accident in history, killing 583 people when two 747 airplanes collided in the regional airport of Tenerife.	MPAIAC	Terrorism in Spain Tenerife airport disaster
April 7	Shooting	3	0	West Germany	Federal Prosecutor Siegfried Buback, his driver Wolfgang Göbel, and judicial officer Georg Wurster were shot by two Red Army Faction members.	Red Army Faction	
April 13	Kidnapping	1	0	Verrières-le-Buisson, France	Luchino Revelli-Beaumont, director of FIAT in France was abducted and executed by a group of people who had been involved in guerrilla organizations in Argentina. According to the relatives of the businessman the fact was committed with the purpose of obtaining a ransom that, finally, was 2 million dollars. The kidnapping was released after 89 days and all but one of them were arrested but could not be tried.	Argentinian Militants	Dirty War
May 1	Massacre	34	136	Taksim Square, Istanbul, Turkey	Resulted in the deaths of 34 people and the injury of 136 people on International Workers' Day.	Counter-Guerrilla	
May 23 – June 11	Hostage crisis	0	0	Bovensmilde, Netherlands	Four South Moluccan youths took 110 hostages at a primary school. The crisis ended after 20 days, when authorities decided to launch an assault. The hostage takers surrendered after learning about their companions' fate in the assault on the train on which they held hostages of their own.	South Moluccan freedom fighters	
May 23 – June 11	Hijacking	2 (+6)	6	Glimmen, Netherlands	Nine South Moluccan youths hijacked a train and took an estimated 50 hostages. The ordeal lasted 20 days and was carried out concurrently with the school hostage taking in Bovensmilde.	South Moluccan freedom fighters	
May 29	Bombings	5	+64	Istanbul, Turkey	A double bombing in railroad station and airport killed five persons and wounded 64.	Justice Commandos of the Armenian Genocide	Terrorism in Turkey
June 2	Shooting	3	0	Ardboe, United Kingdom	Three members of a Royal Ulster Constabulary (RUC) Police Force mobile patrol were shot and killed by Provisional Irish Republican Army snipers in County Tyrone.	PIRA	The Troubles
June 9	Assassination	1	0	Rome, Italy	Assassination of Taha Carım, Turkish ambassador to the Holy See	Justice Commandos of the Armenian Genocide	
July 6	Bombing	1	22	Petah Tikva, Israel	A pipe bomb exploded in a vegetable market, killing one and wounding 22.	Palestinians	
July 24	Bombing	0 (1 dog)	0	United States	The home of Morris J. Amitay was bombed in the early morning hours. Amitay was executive director of the American Israel Public Affairs Committee. None of the sleeping family was hurt but the family dog was killed.	Unknown	
July 30	Murder, attempted kidnapping	1	0	Oberursel, West Germany	Jürgen Ponto was shot and killed in a botched kidnapping attempt by members of the Red Army Faction.	Red Army Faction	
August 3	Bombing	1	8	New York City, United States	Puerto Rican nationalist group Fuerzas Armadas de Liberación Nacional Puertorriqueña in Manhattan bombed the offices of Mobil Oil and a building containing United States Department of Defense security personnel, killing one person and injuring eight others in the Mobil offices. In addition, the group warned that bombs were located in thirteen other buildings, including the Empire State Building and the World Trade Center, resulting in the evacuation of a hundred thousand people. Five days later, a bomb attributed to the group was found in the American Express building.	FALN	
September 28 – October 3	Hijacking	0	0	Dhaka, Bangladesh	Five members of the Japanese Red Army hijack Japan Airlines Flight 472 and demand $6 million USD as well as the release of nine imprisoned JRA members. The hijackers released all hostages without incident after their demands were met and after being given a safe passage to Algeria.	Japanese Red Army	
September 29	Murder	1	0	Chipinga, Rhodesia	A 6-month old baby, Natasha Glenny, is bayoneted to death during an attack on a homestead near the Mozambican border.		Rhodesian Bush War
October 8	Assassination	3	0	Guernica, Spain	Guernica mayor and President of the Provincial Deputation of Biscay Augusto Unceta Barrenechea is assassinated along with his two bodyguards by ETA.	ETA	Basque conflict
October 13	Hijacking	1 (+3)	3 (+1)	Mogadishu, Somalia	Lufthansa Flight 181 was hijacked by a group of four members of the Popular Front for the Liberation of Palestine (PFLP) and taken to Mogadishu; it was later released after a rescue operation launched by a GSG 9 commando group.	PFLP	Israeli–Palestinian conflict
October 18	Kidnapping, murder	1	0	West Germany/France	Hanns Martin Schleyer is murdered by the Red Army Faction in France after three RAF members were found dead in prison. The RAF had kidnapped Schleyer six weeks earlier in Cologne.	Red Army Faction	German Autumn
December 4	Hijacking	100	0	Tanjung Kupang, Malaysia	Malaysian Airline System Flight 653 is hijacked by an unknown perpetrator and crashes about 40 minutes after the first reports of a hijacking. The hijacker and the circumstances of the crash have never been identified, however, several gunshots were heard over the cockpit voice recorder and the pilots may have said over the CVR that the hijacker was a Japanese Red Army member.	Unknown	
December 19	Bombing	0	0	Paris, France	A bomb destroyed the luxury food shop Fauchon.		
December 28	Bombing	1	0	San Ġwann, Malta	Karin Grech is killed by a letterbomb. Her father, Edwin Grech, who was the head of the OB/GYN department at St. Luke's Hospital was the likely target as there was a worker's strike going on St. Luke's at the time of the bombing.	Unknown	

== See also ==
- List of (non-state) terrorist incidents
