= 1977 in Palestine =

- Decades: 1950s; 1960s; 1970s; 1980s; 1990s
- See also: History of Palestine; Timeline of Palestinian history; List of years in Palestine

Events in the year 1977 in Palestine.

== Incumbents ==
- Chairman of the Palestine Liberation Organization – Yasser Arafat

== Events ==
=== March ===
- 30 March: Land Day is marked by demonstrations and general strikes across the occupied territories.

=== April ===
- 5 April: Thousands of Gush Emunim supporters march through Samaria in support of Israeli settlement in the West Bank.

=== May ===
- 3 May: Two Palestinians die and six Israelis are injured in an outbreak of unrest on the West Bank sparked by a Gush Emunim announcement that it intended to establish more settlements.

=== June ===
- 5 June: General strikes are held in Nablus and Ramallah to mark the tenth anniversary of the Six-Day War and the start of the Israeli occupation.

=== July ===
- 6 July: The PLO perpetrates the 1977 Petah Tikva bombing in Israel, killing an Israeli civilian.

=== November ===
- The Israeli settlement of Beit El is established.

=== December ===
- 1 December: The Israeli settlement of Beit Horon is established, and the 19th century settlement of Giv'on HaHadasha is reestablished.

== See also ==
- 1977 in Israel
- 1977 in Jordan
