= Murder of Karin Grech =

Maltese victim of a letterbomb (1962–1977)

Karin Grech
- Born: 1962; Malta
- Died: 28 December 1977 (aged 14–15); St. Luke's Hospital, Gwardamanġa, Malta
- Known for: Murdered by letterbomb

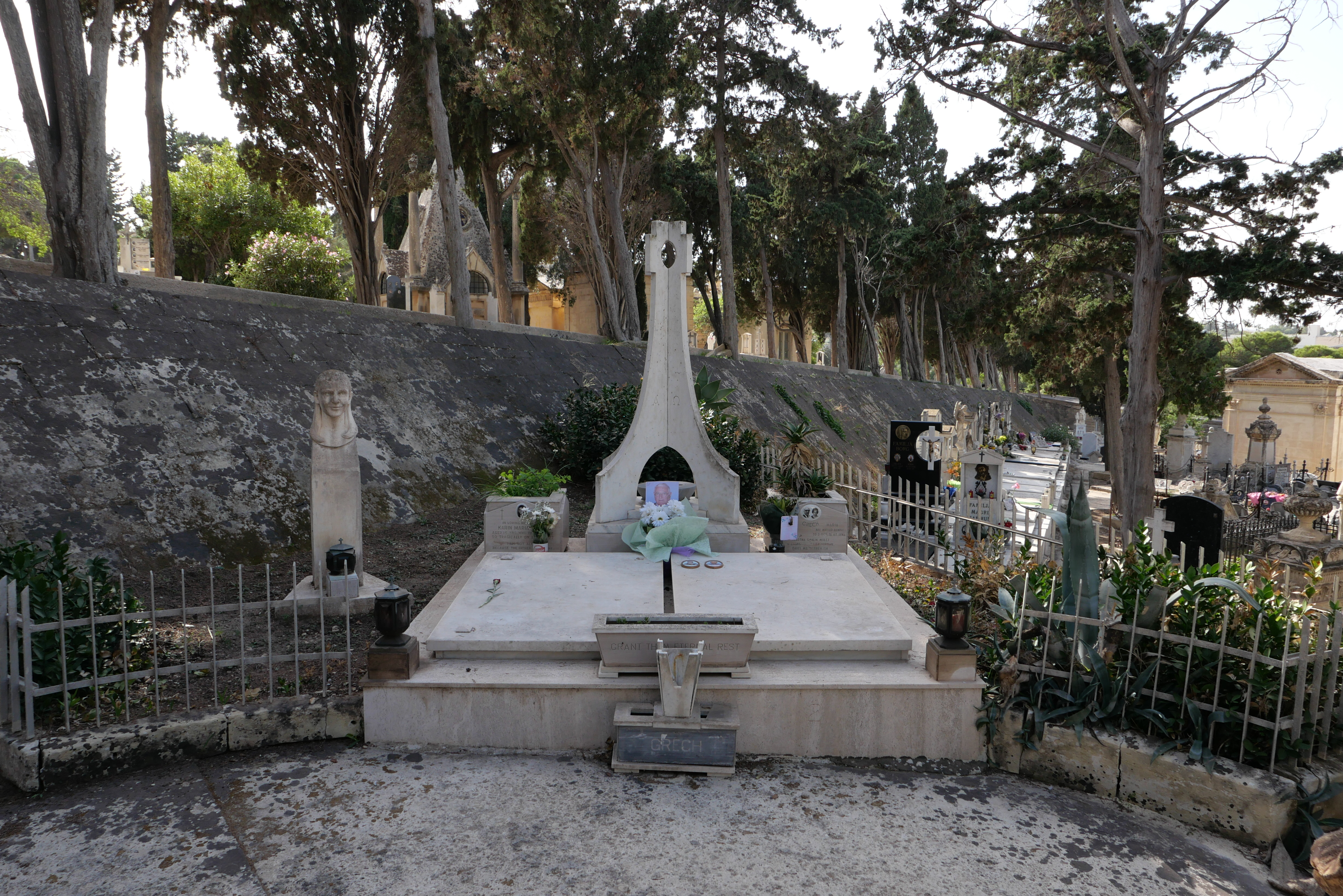
Grech's tomb in the family grave with a bust of her at the cemetery of Santa Maria Addolorata ("Our Lady of Sorrows") in Paola

Karin Maria Grech (1962 – 28 December 1977) was the daughter of Professor Edwin Grech, then head of the department of obstetrics and gynecology at St. Luke's Hospital, Malta.

In 1977, aged 15, she was killed by a letterbomb addressed to her father. Three days after Christmas Day, in the presence of her brother Kevin (then 10 years old), she opened the brown envelope to find a "small, pen-box shaped parcel in Christmas wrapping" Karin opened the package, the bomb exploded, and she died half an hour later at St. Luke's Hospital, due to severe burns on various parts of her body. At her funeral Mass, Archbishop Mikiel Gonzi called the murder of Karin Grech "the first terrorist act in the country".

== 1977 doctors' strike ==
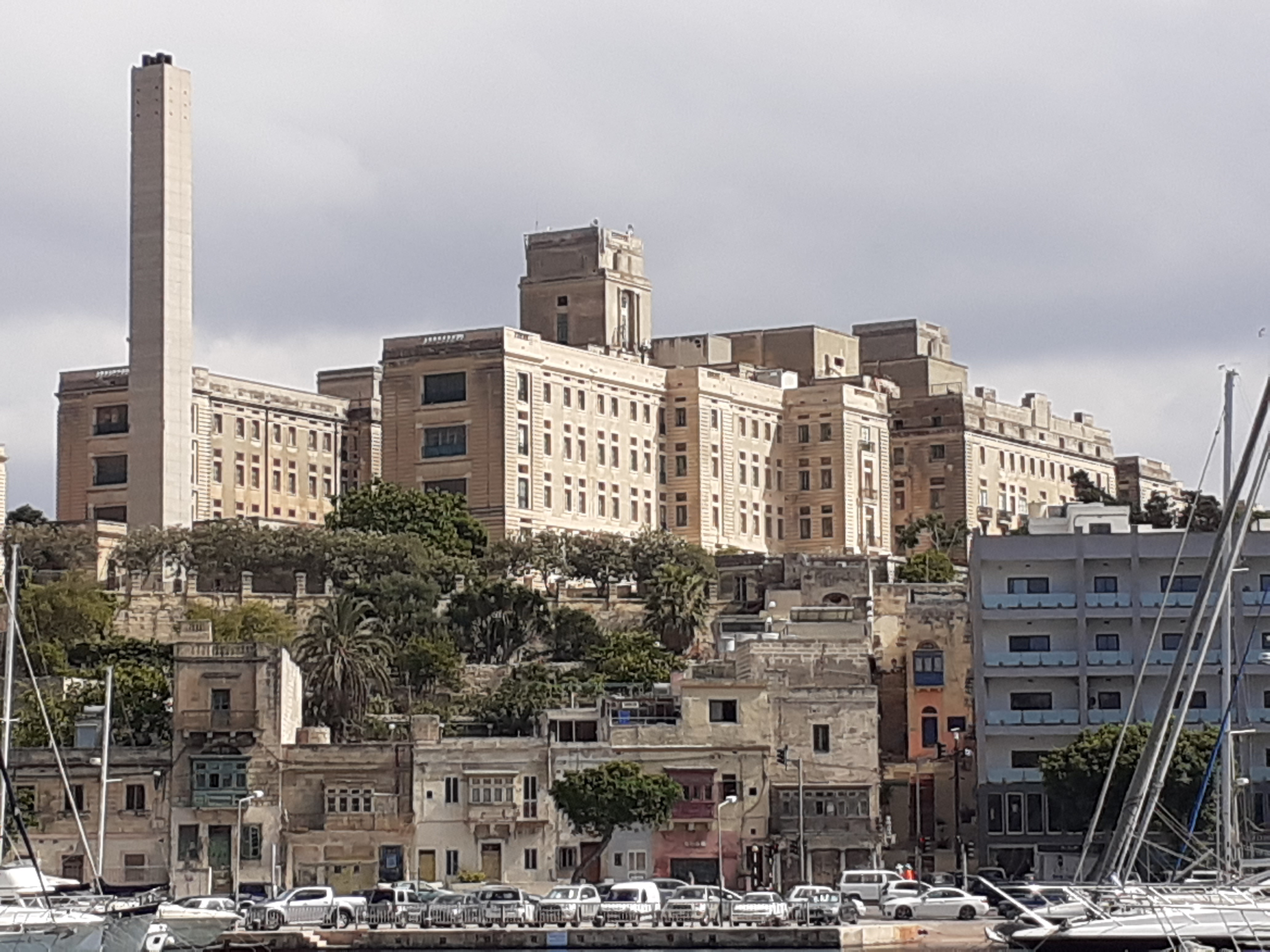
St. Luke's Hospital

At that time the doctors at Saint Luke's Hospital had an issue with the Labour Government and there was a strike at the hospital. Despite this Grech still went to work, and although there is no forensic evidence linking the bomb to the doctors' strike, the strike and persons related to those events were blamed. On the same day that the Grech family received the bomb, another bomb was sent to the doctor and then-Labour MP Paul Chetcuti Caruana, but it did not detonate.

== Investigation ==
The case remains unsolved, the perpetrators unknown, and the Magisterial Inquiry is still open. Since 2008, the Police have been interrogating people who had not been questioned by police in previous investigations. In 2009, the newspaper It-Torċa reported that the police suspected a small number of Maltese doctors who reside in England, who were known to have close ties with the Nationalist Party at the time of the 1977 doctors' strike. The same newspaper reported that articles which appeared in the British Medical Journal in 1977 are also being investigated.

== Compensation ==
In late November 2010, the Civil Court ordered the Prime Minister to give a sum of €419,287 to Professor Grech and his family as compensation for Karin's murder. Grech said that this opens many doors in his investigation to help the police to find out the killer or killers. At the same time, he showed disappointment at the way the police have investigated the murder of his daughter. Judge Raymond Pace, who chaired the proceedings, said that the failure of the Government to compensate the family for all these years is a discriminatory treatment based on policy. The judge made it clear that the crime happened as a consequence of the services that Professor Grech offered to the Maltese Government, and that the Government, in deciding to refuse compensation, was acting in a discriminatory manner. Judge Pace argued that the evidence shows that the government compensated several people who ended up as victims due to their service to the Government, or who have suffered from violent acts, but failed to do the same with the Grech family.

A few days later the Government announced that it would appeal the judgement. Although it said it would pay the compensation, the Government said that it did not agree with the Court that this was a political case, as the crime remains unsolved. On 11 April 2011, the Constitutional Court dismissed the appeal brought by the Government and upheld the judgements of the Civil Court. The government accepted the ruling and paid the compensation.

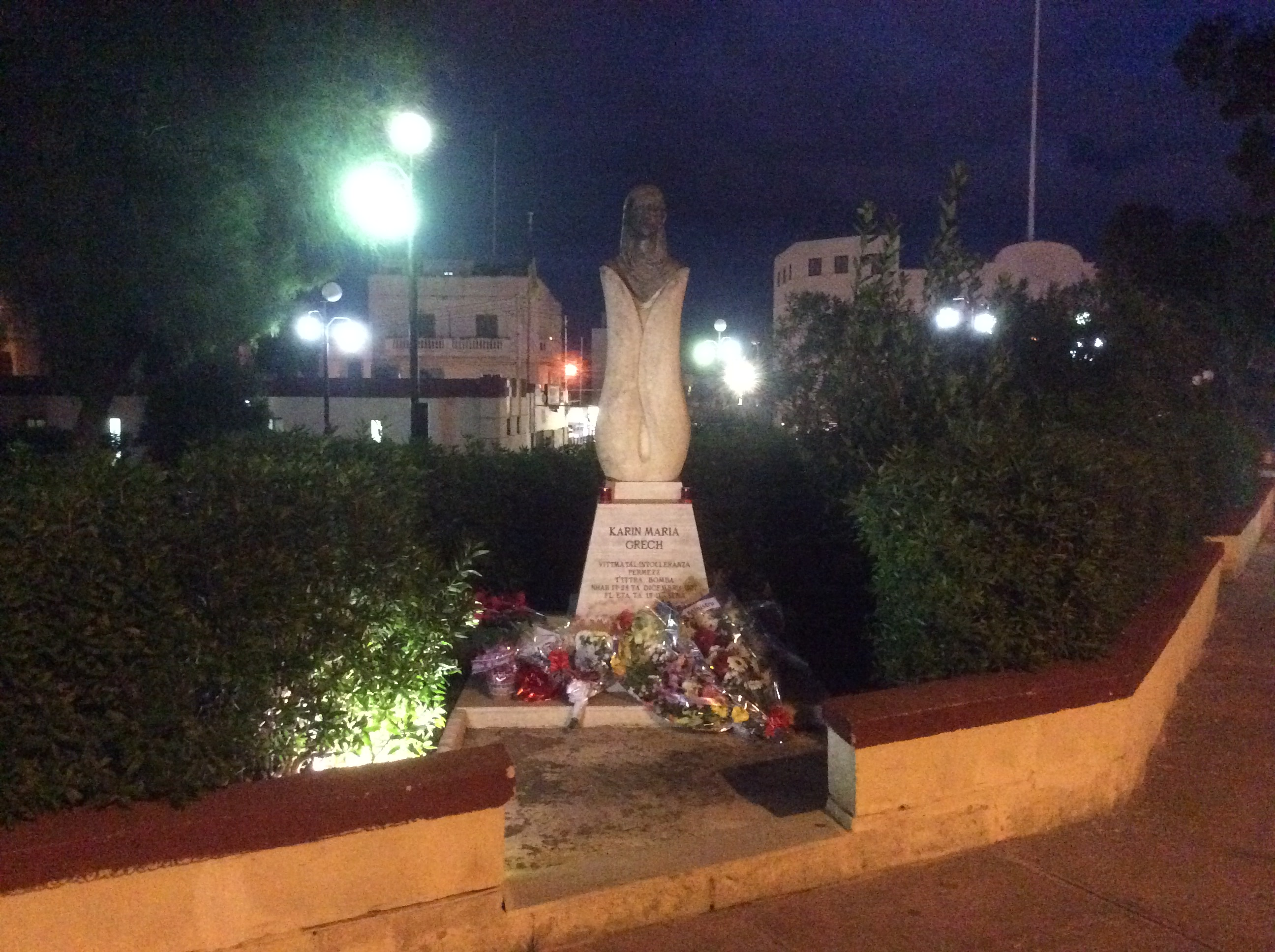
Flowers laid at the monument in the Karin Grech Garden in 2015

== Legacy ==
After Karin's murder, some postal items were checked for bombs between 1978 and 2001. The ones which were marked as safe were marked with a cross and the name of the place where it was applied.

=== Monuments and memorials ===
- Karin Grech Hospital, Guardamangia Hill, Pietà (built 1981 near St. Luke's Hospital)
- Karin Grech Garden, San Ġwann, where a sculpture of her is located.

== See also ==
- List of terrorist incidents in 1977
- List of unsolved murders (1900–1979)
