= Colonna Mediterranea =

- Kolonna tal-Mediterran
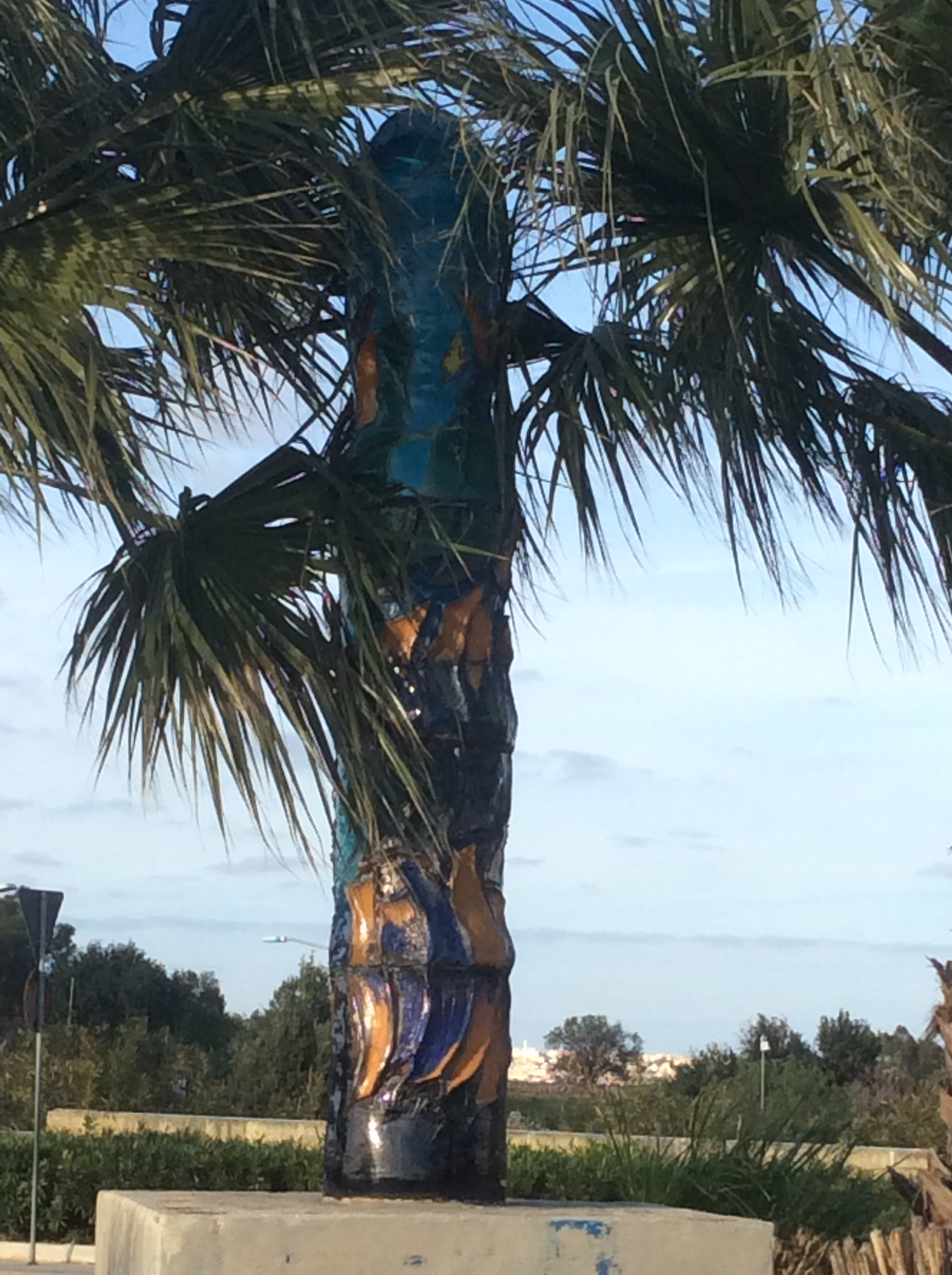
- View of the Colonna Mediterranea

General information
- Status: Intact
- Type: Decorative Egyptian obelisk
- Architectural style: Abstract art
- Location: Luqa, Malta
- Coordinates: 35°51′37.58″N 14°29′2.35″E
- Named for: Mediterranean
- Completed: 2006
- Owner: Government of Malta

Technical details
- Material: Ceramic

Colonna Mediterranea (Italian for "Mediterranean column") commonly known as The Luqa Monument (Maltese: Il-Monument ta' Ħal Luqa) is a 21st-century landmark obelisk in Luqa, Malta. The abstract art has created local and international controversy over its phallic appearance.

== Location ==
Colonna Mediterranea is located on a roundabout, in Luqa, known to locals as the Lidl roundabout as a Lidl supermarket is nearby. It is on Carmel Street, a busy road next to Luqa Airport exactly on one of the entries of the town of Luqa.

== History ==
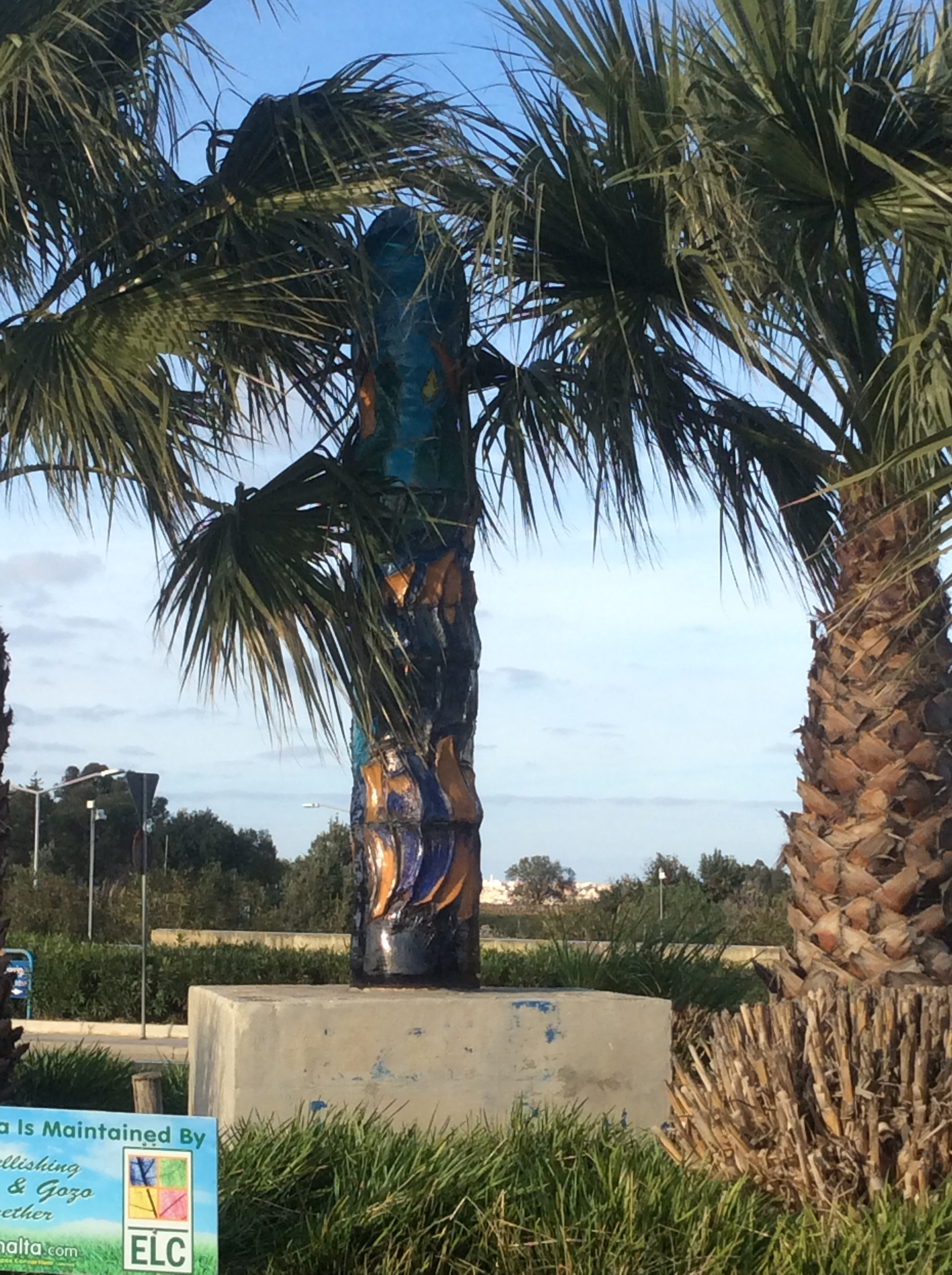
Colonna Mediterranea hidden by the palm trees

The monument was designed by Maltese artist Paul Vella Critien. It was built in 2006 and was described by the artist as a 3D "Egyptian symbol", taking the form of an abstract art representing the colors of the Mediterranean.

Despite its description of a modern Egyptian obelisk, the description is far-off from the notable description that is given. The monument cannot be said to represent a phallus, as according to the artist it is not, but remains well known as a "phallic monument". It has been described as a large penis (male sexual organ). The monument has been described as "vulgar", "obscene" and "offensive". The Luqa mayor, John Schembri, has called for its removal. During the visit of Pope Benedict XVI to Malta, people including the Luqa local Council and the Roman Catholic Archdiocese of Malta called for its removal. A survey conducted by the Malta-Surveys found that most of those who participated wanted the monument to stay. The monument received extensive coverage by the BBC, The Daily Telegraph, The Huffington Post, ABC News, USA Today, Times of Malta, Malta Today, The Malta Independent and other local and international media.

The 10 feet monument was suggested to be covered with plastic similarly to a condom in context of the Catholic Church's opposition to the use of. Subsequently, the monument has been vandalized and then restored. The vandalism involved the damaging of the upper part of the monument. Hence to its phallic appearance the vandalism was described as having had a medical procedure to be circumcised. The Government of Malta has planted large palm trees next to it, probably to conceal it. These trees were later trimmed, during the restoration project after the vandalism, that revealed the monument again.

The maintenance and decisions concerning the monument do not fall under the Luqa Local council but the Ministry of Transport (Government of Malta). The monument was on legal notice to be removed in the same year when erected, in 2006, as it does not have a permission from the Malta Environment and Planning Authority (MEPA) but until present it still stands in its place, and probably is there to stay. The monument is so widely spoken about that Vodafone Malta made use of its notability for an advertisement. Joe Demicoli, a well established comical singer and actor, has written a song as well with a video dedicated to the monument. It is to note that phallic symbols are common in Maltese heritage.

== Other monuments ==
Previous to Colonna Mediterranea Paul Vella Critien created another similar monument in San Gwann namely the Kolonna Eterna in 2003. Critien has eventually inaugurated another monument at Naxxar Higher Secondary School in 2015. The artist has also created similar monuments elsewhere in the world, for example in Italy, Germany and Australia.

== See also ==
- Kolonna Eterna
- Phallic architecture
- Phallus
- Landmarks
- Egyptian obelisk
