= Santa Margerita Chapel =

Chapel in San Gwann, Malta

Coordinates: 35.9100°N 14.4770°E

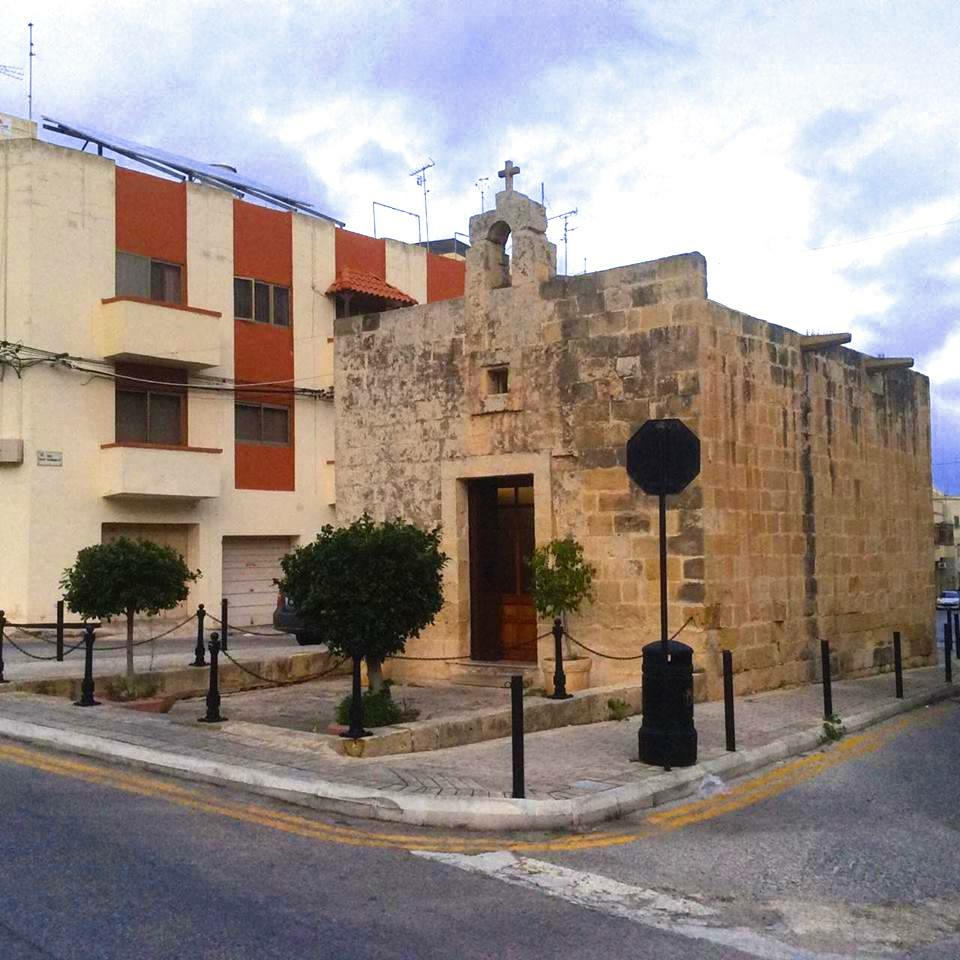
- Façade of Santa Margerita Chapel

Religion
- Affiliation: Roman Catholic
- Rite: Latin
- Ecclesiastical or organizational status: Community Chapel
- Year consecrated: 1618 (second time)

Location
- Location: San Gwann, Malta
- Interactive map of Santa Margerita Chapel

Architecture
- Type: church building
- Style: Vernacular

Santa Margerita Chapel (English: Saint Margaret Chapel), also known as Arar Chapel, is a 16th century chapel in San Gwann, Malta. The chapel was built for the farmers working the surrounding fields. At the time, attacks from the sea were common.

The chapel was partially damaged during World War II, with serious damage but large portions surviving. Today the church is a landmark in San Gwann, in architectural contrast with the modern housing of the area.

== History ==
The exact date when Saint Margerita Chapel was built is unknown but it was around the event of the Great Siege of Malta. It was mentioned for the first time in an inscription of Monsignor Pietro Dusina in 1575, when he was sent by the papacy to inspect the sparse chapels on the Maltese islands. He found the chapel to be the property of a local man named Salvu Calleja who made sure that a Mass took place in the chapel once a year on the feast day of St. Margaret. However, according to the standards of an inspecting Monsignor, it was not suitable to be a place of worship, as it was not well kept and had no door. He ordered that the chapel not be used until a door was attached to the entrance.

In the inscription, it is written:

Sanctae Margaritae.
Visitavit etiam alliam Ecclesiam ruralem sub vocabulo Sanctae Margaritae in pertinentia Bircalcariae,
constructam in contrata Arar,
quae habet altare, caret portis ligneis, rectore,
introitibus, et omnibus alija necessarijs,
sed Salvus Calleja ex devotione sua in die festivitatis in eadem celebrari facit missam rantum.
Dominus mandavit non celebrari, nisi appositis portis ligneis, quibus Ecclesia decenter custodiatur.

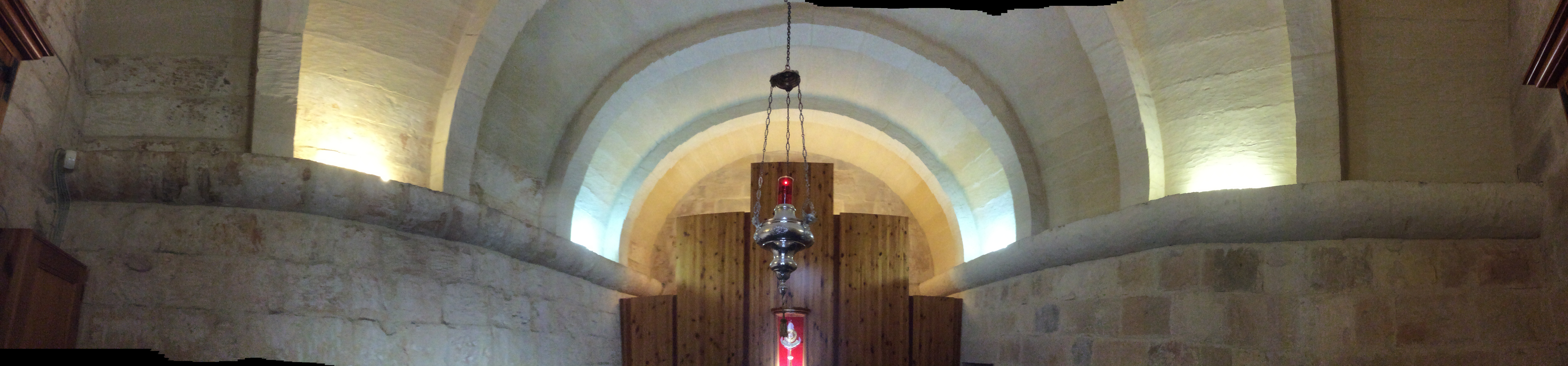
Interior of the chapel

Saint Margaret Chapel was deconsecrated in 1605, since in the late 16th century and in the early 17th century attacks by the Ottoman Empire increased and the chapel fell into disuse. It was consecrated again in 1618 by Bishop Baldassare Cagliares. Bishop Michele Girolamo Molina in 1658 observed that it suffered serious neglect while abandoned, and Father Giacomo Pullucino took the initiative to restore the chapel, finishing in 1666. Pullicino died in 1680 and was allowed to be buried inside the chapel, as documented by Bishop Miguel Juan Balaguer Camarasa, the parish priest of Birkirkara. At the time San Gwann was a part of Birkirkara and consequentially San Gwann was originally part of Birkirkara parish, and ecclesiastical decisions were taken there. Following the death of Pullucino his family was also given permission to be interned in the chapel when they died. In 1680 Bishop Molina made a courtesy visit and offered Mass, as did Bishop Joaquín Canaves In 1718.

== Recent ==
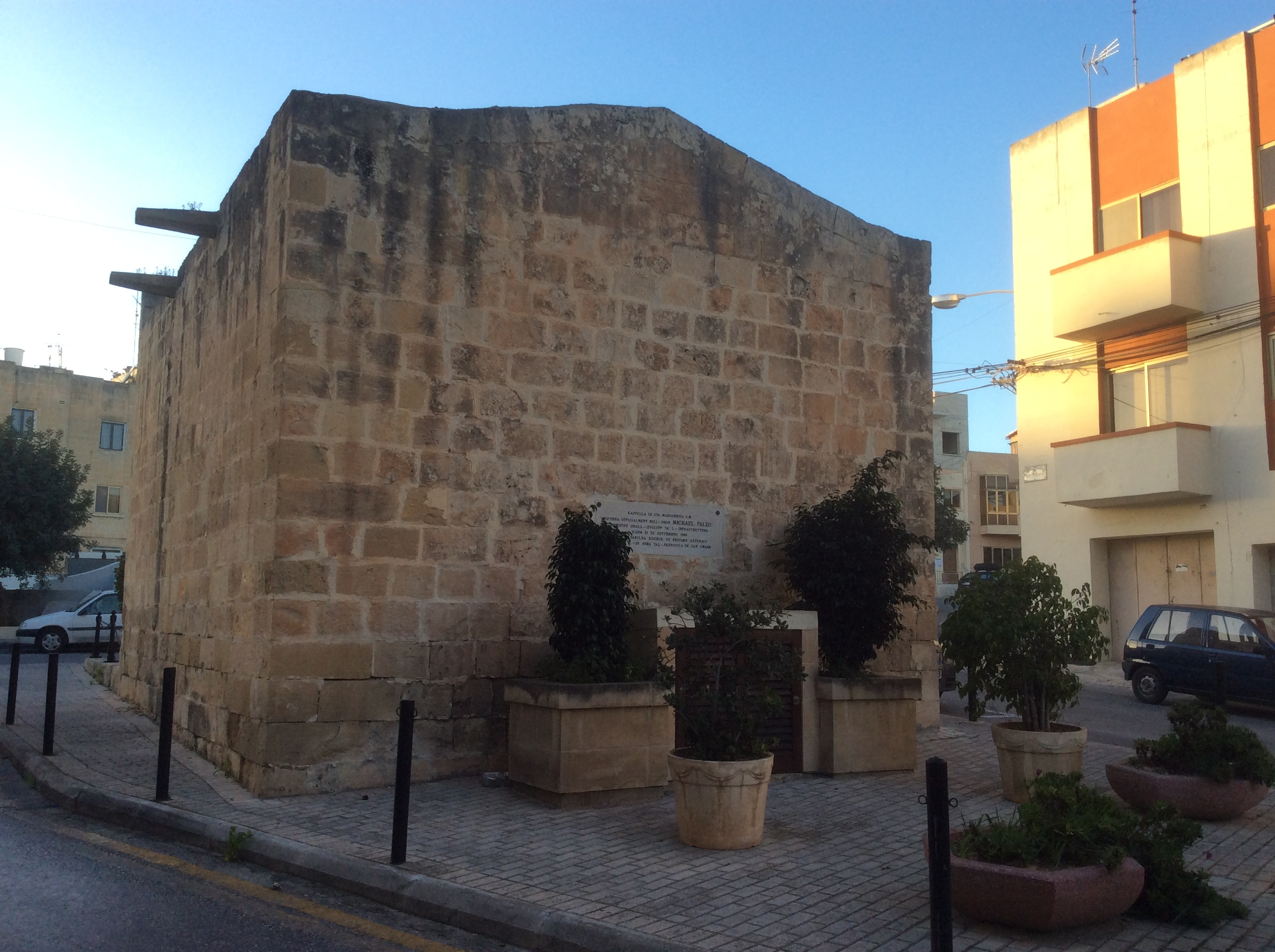
The chapel as seen from the back

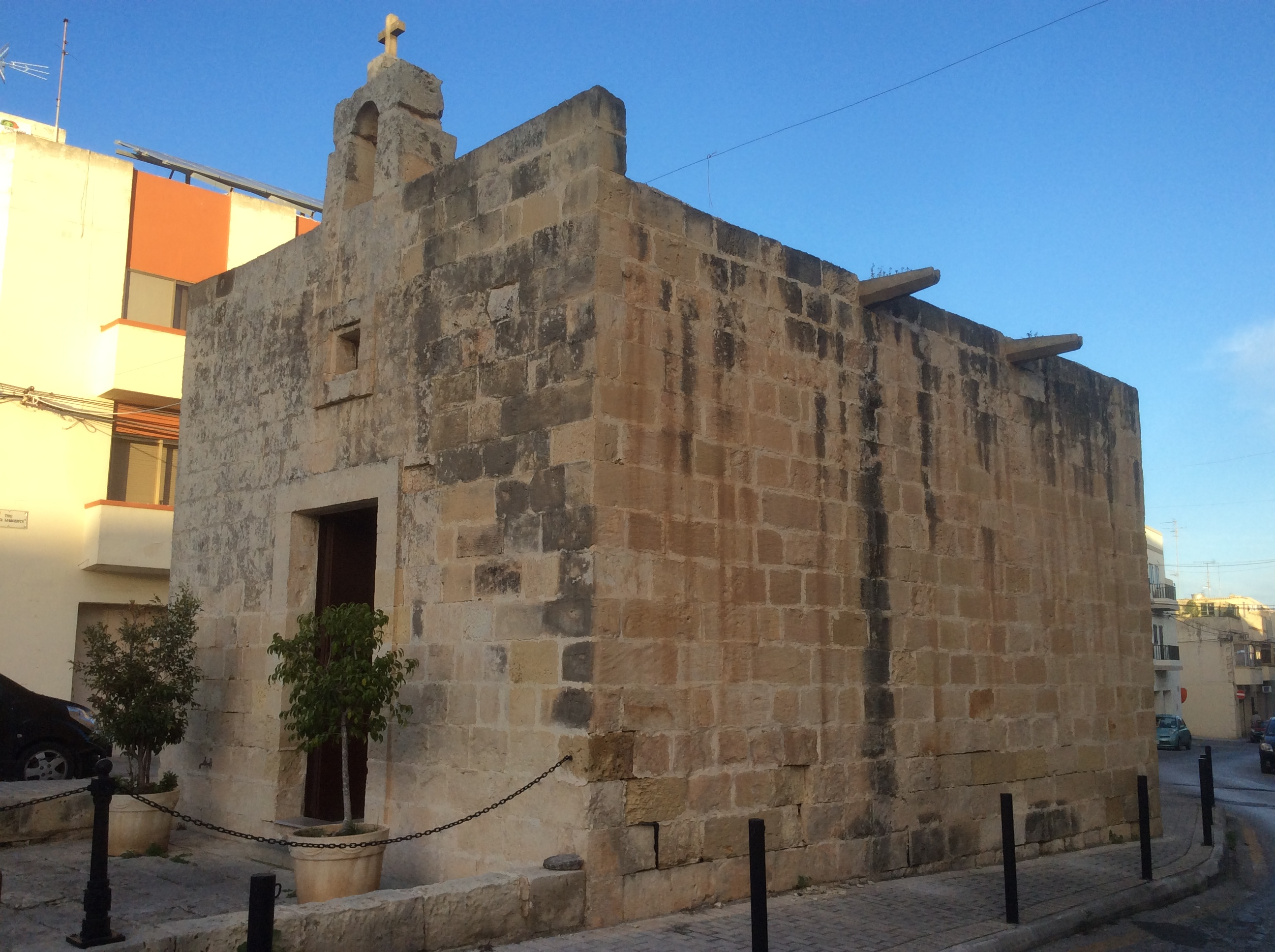
Showing the difference between the medieval stones and the 'new' reconstructed stones

During World War II several families relocated to San Gwann from the Valletta and the surrounding cities and suburbs, for safety's sake. The chapel was directly hit during the war, destroying its ceiling and one of the side walls. After the war more families relocated to San Gwann as many of buildings in the cities had suffered serious damage. The chapel's damaged parts and original architecture were restored.

On the inauguration plaque, it is written:

Kappella Ta' Sta Margherita V.M.
Miftuha Ufficjalment Mill-Onor Michael Falzon
Ministru Ghall-Izvilupp U Ta' L-Infrasfruttura
Illum 21 Ta' Settembru 1990
Wara Li Sarilha Xoghol Ta' Restawr Estensiv
F' Eghluq Il-25 Sena Tal-Parocca Ta' San Gwann

A parish church dedicated to Our Lady of Lourdes was built in the 1950s, replacing the chapel. Today the chapel is used for adoration, with Masses celebrated less frequently. It is sometimes used for the children of the local schools, for weddings and on the feast of Saint Margaret. Traditionally the chapel was in the middle of farming fields and agricultural lands, but today it is in the middle of an urban zone. The chapel's building is used as a roundabout and stands proudly as a landmark on its own. In 1994 it was scheduled as a grade 1 national monument by the Malta Environment and Planning Authority. In 2003 a new monument by the name of Kolonna Eterna was installed just in front of the chapel. The two monuments are in contrast, but complement each other in this central area of San Gwann.

== Cultural Heritage ==
Santa Margerita Chapel is scheduled as a grade 1 national monument since 1994 by the Malta Environment and Planning Authority (MEPA).

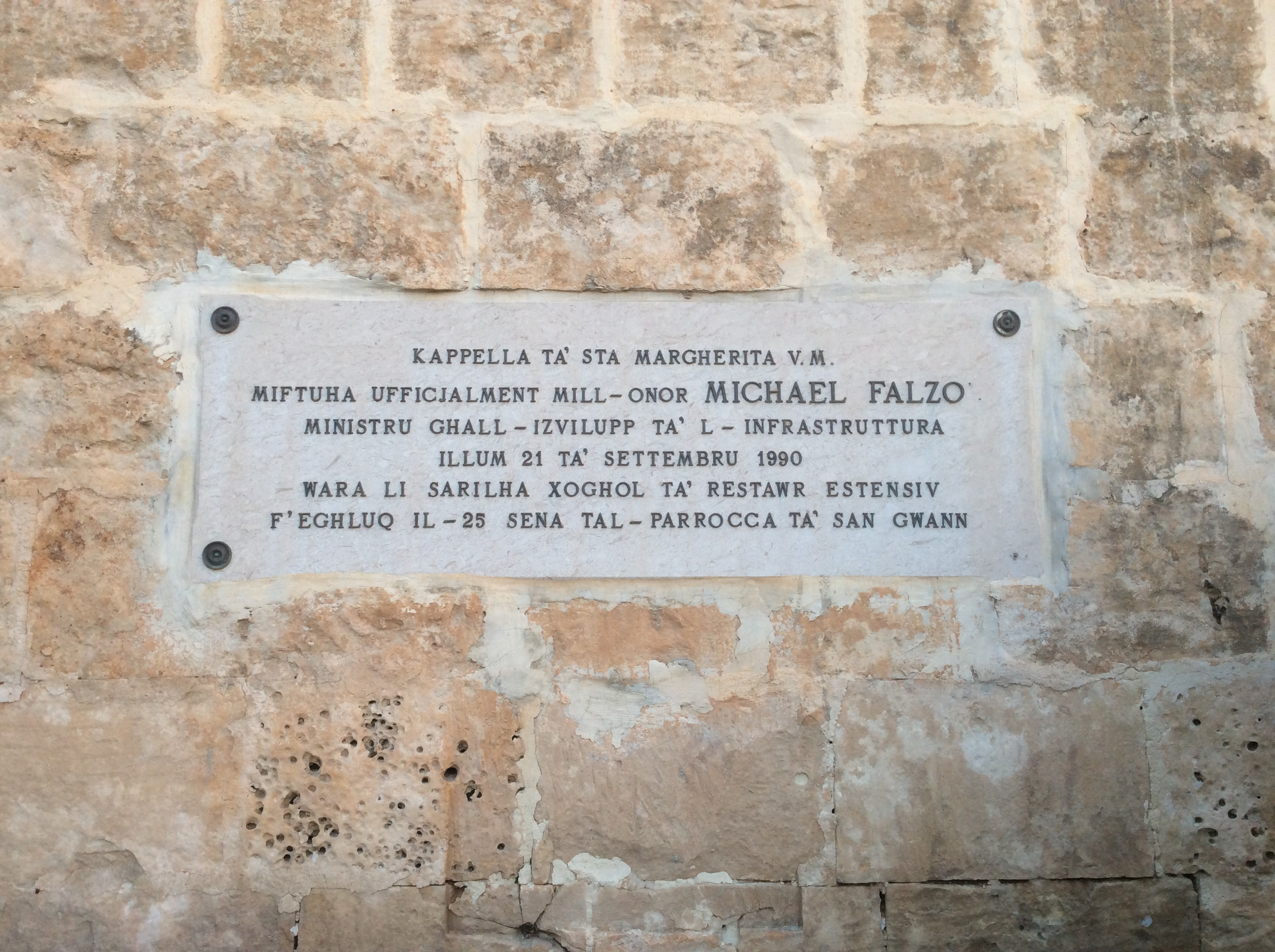
Plaque uncovered after the damaged parts were rebuilt and the chapel was reopened to the public

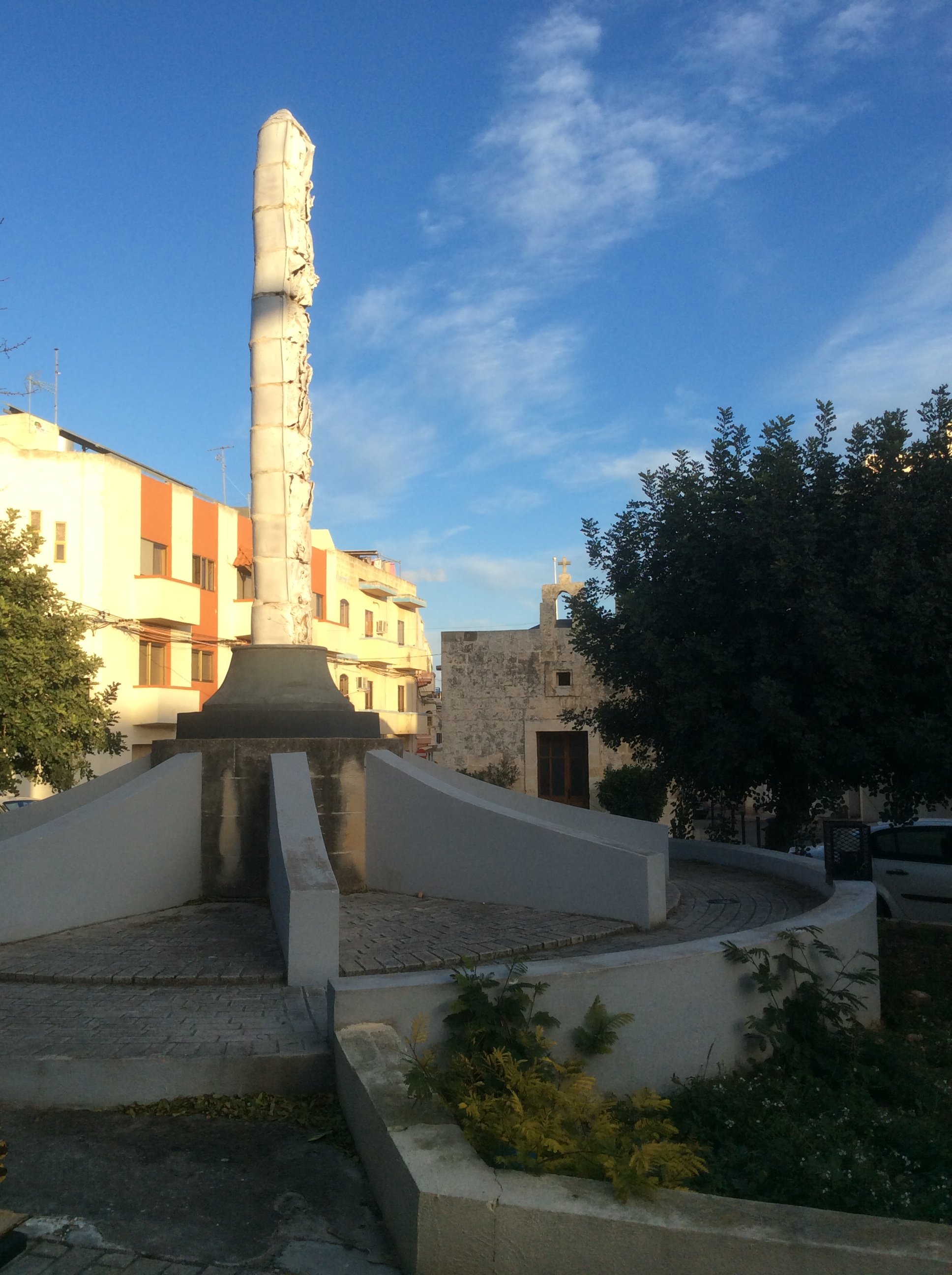
Kolonna Eterna on the left and Santa Margerita Chapel see far on the right

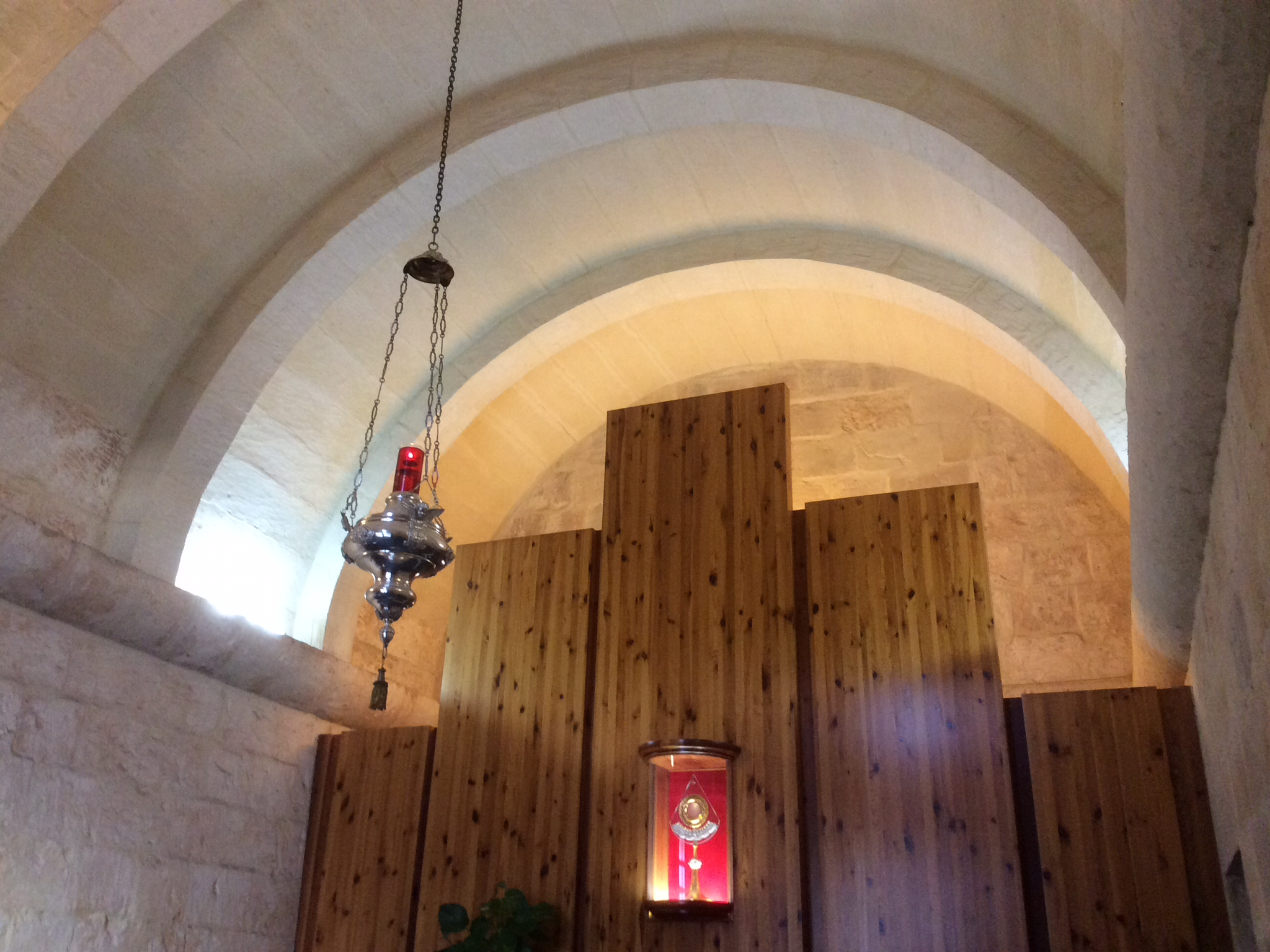
Adoration of the Eucharist
