= Kolonna Eterna =

Obelisk in San Gwann, Malta

- Kolonna Eterna
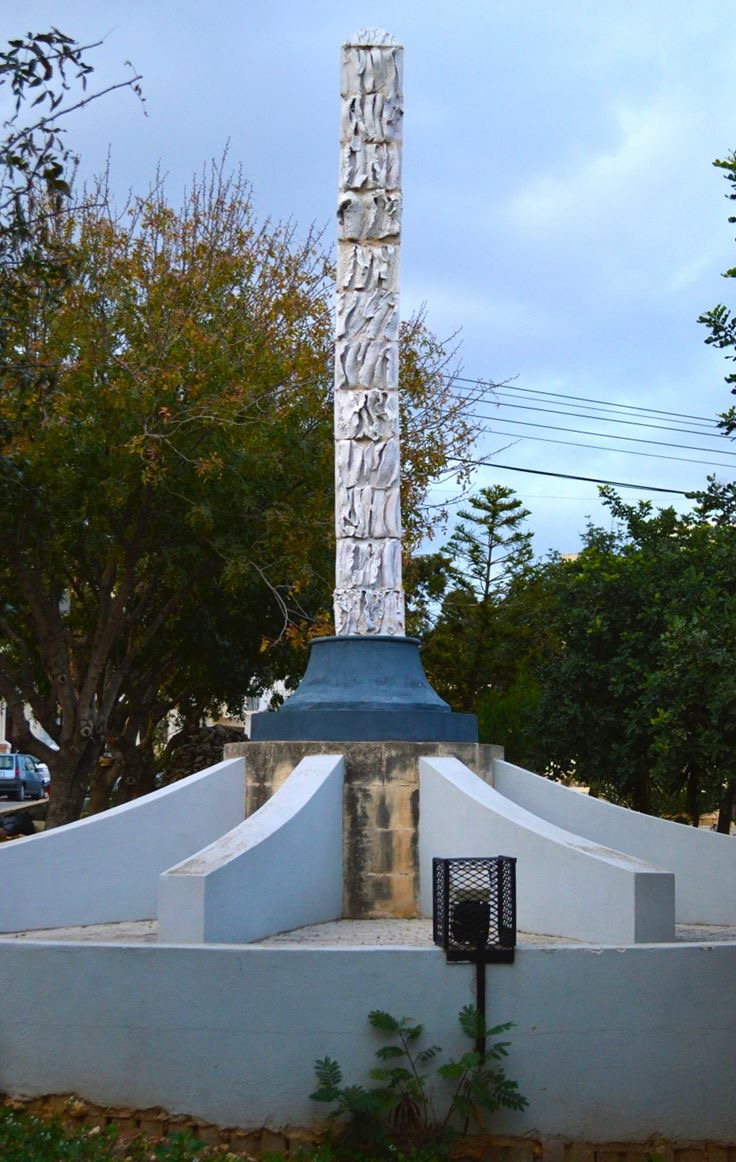
- View of the Kolonna Eterna

General information
- Status: Intact
- Type: Commemorative monument
- Architectural style: Obelisk
- Location: San Gwann, Malta
- Coordinates: 35°54′36.2″N 14°28′36.2″E
- Named for: Eternity
- Completed: 2003
- Owner: Government of Malta

Technical details
- Material: Ceramic

Kolonna Eterna (English: Eternal Column), also known as the Millennium Monument, is a 21st-century monumental column in San Gwann, Malta. The column is an abstract art designed by Paul Vella Critien, a Maltese local artist that achieved his studies and experience in Italy and Australia.

The monument is a commemoration of the new (third) millennium as part of an initiative by the San Gwann Local Council. The monument was inaugurated in 2003 by the Prime Minister of Malta Eddie Fenech Adami. The monument came to the national attention because it was largely described as having a phallic appearance. The monument is found in front of Santa Margerita Chapel.

== History ==
The Kolonna Eterna was the first local monument by Paul Vella Critien to be installed in a public space and officiated on 27 February 2003. Behind the project was the San Gwann Local Council which pushed the idea of decorating public gardens with the inclusion of well established local artists' art. Paul Vella Critien has received art education in Italy and had already experience as an artist career when he lived in Australia. Since its erection the monument had already caught the attention of the public because of its phallic appearance however it is intended to represent an Egyptian obelisk pointing to the open skies as a symbol to eternity.

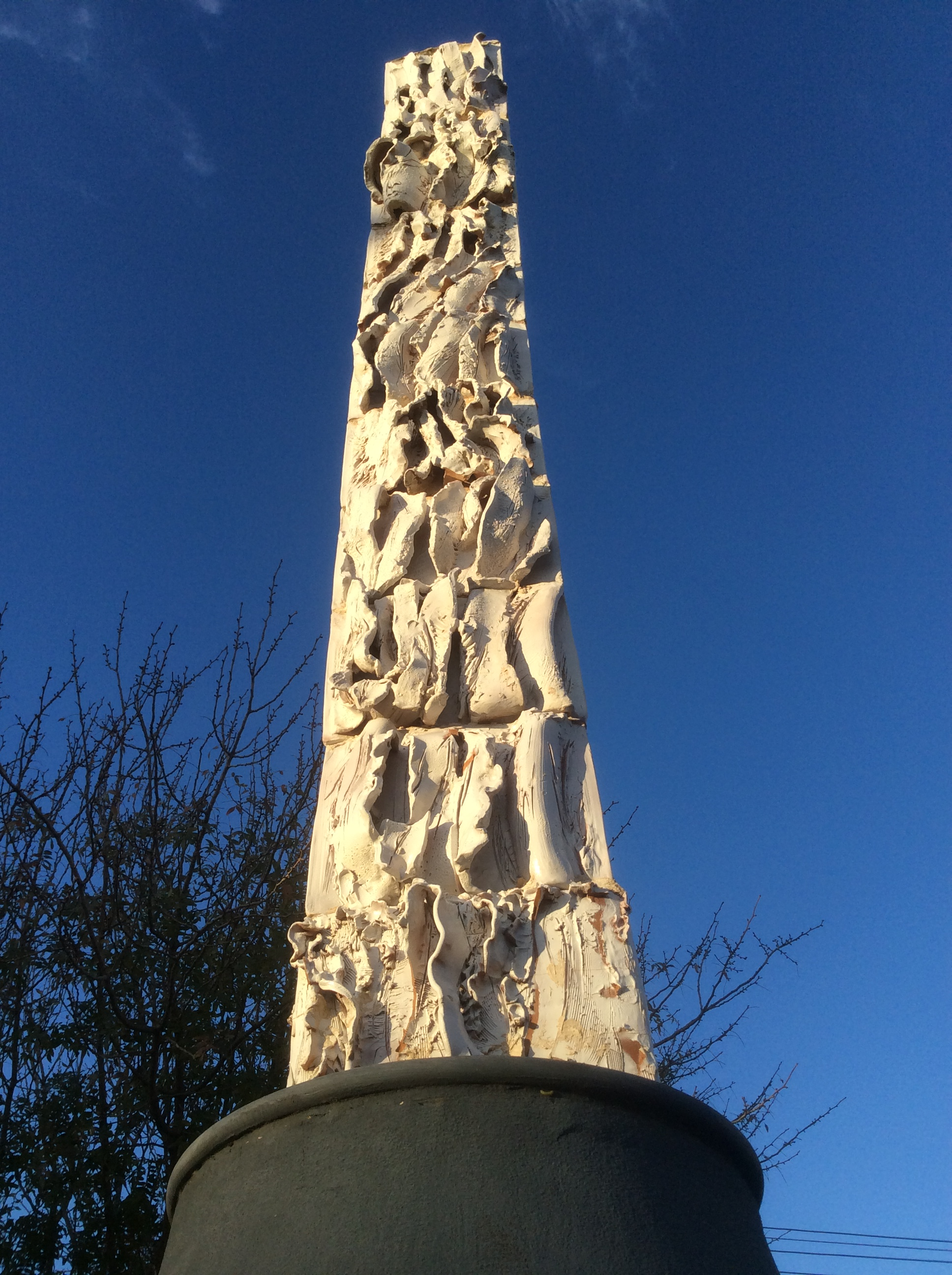
Detail of Kolonna Eterna from the front

The 6 meters ceramic structure was inaugurated by back then Prime Minister in Office Eddie Fenech Adami, later President of Malta. The monument had a public ceremony that was attended by the Prime Minister himself, the artist, the Local Mayor of San Gwann, local councillors, member of the Nationalist Party, distinct politicians, the general public and local media such as the Times of Malta.

Subsequent to the Kolonna Eterna, Paul Vella Critien was invited to create another Monument by the Government of Malta under Prime Minister Lawrence Gonzi. The different but similar phallic appearance is the Colonna Mediterranea in Luqa, Malta. Different from Kolonna Eterna the Luqa Monument had no legal permits for its erection on place, had staunch opposition by the local mayor, it stands on the peripheries of Luqa and not under the responsibility of the local council and had local opposition specifically because of the visit of Pope Benedict XVI to Malta where the pope mobile had to pass by it.

However the San Gwann general public has several artistic monument being erected in different places and the Kolonna Eterna largely integrated within the landscape of the area; even if so some local have called for its removal because of its phallic nature. Eventually in 2015 Paul Vella Critien had inaugurated another monument at Naxxar Higher Secondary School which had not similar controversy.

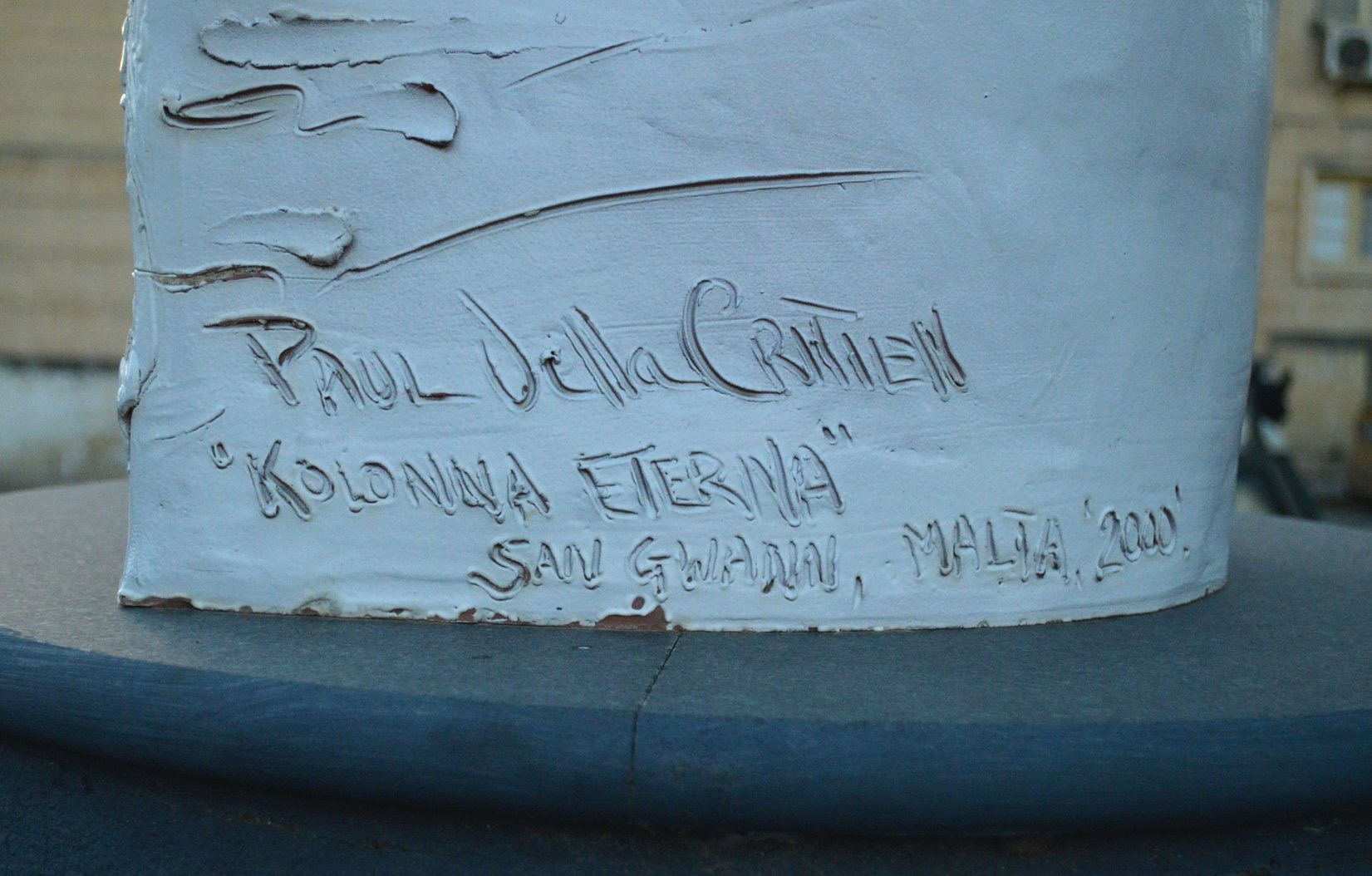
Signature of Paul Vella Critien on Kolonna Eterna

On the lower-back-side of Kolonna Eterna it is written:

Paul Vella Critien

"Kolonna Eterna"
San Gwann, Malta, '2000'

== Plaque ==
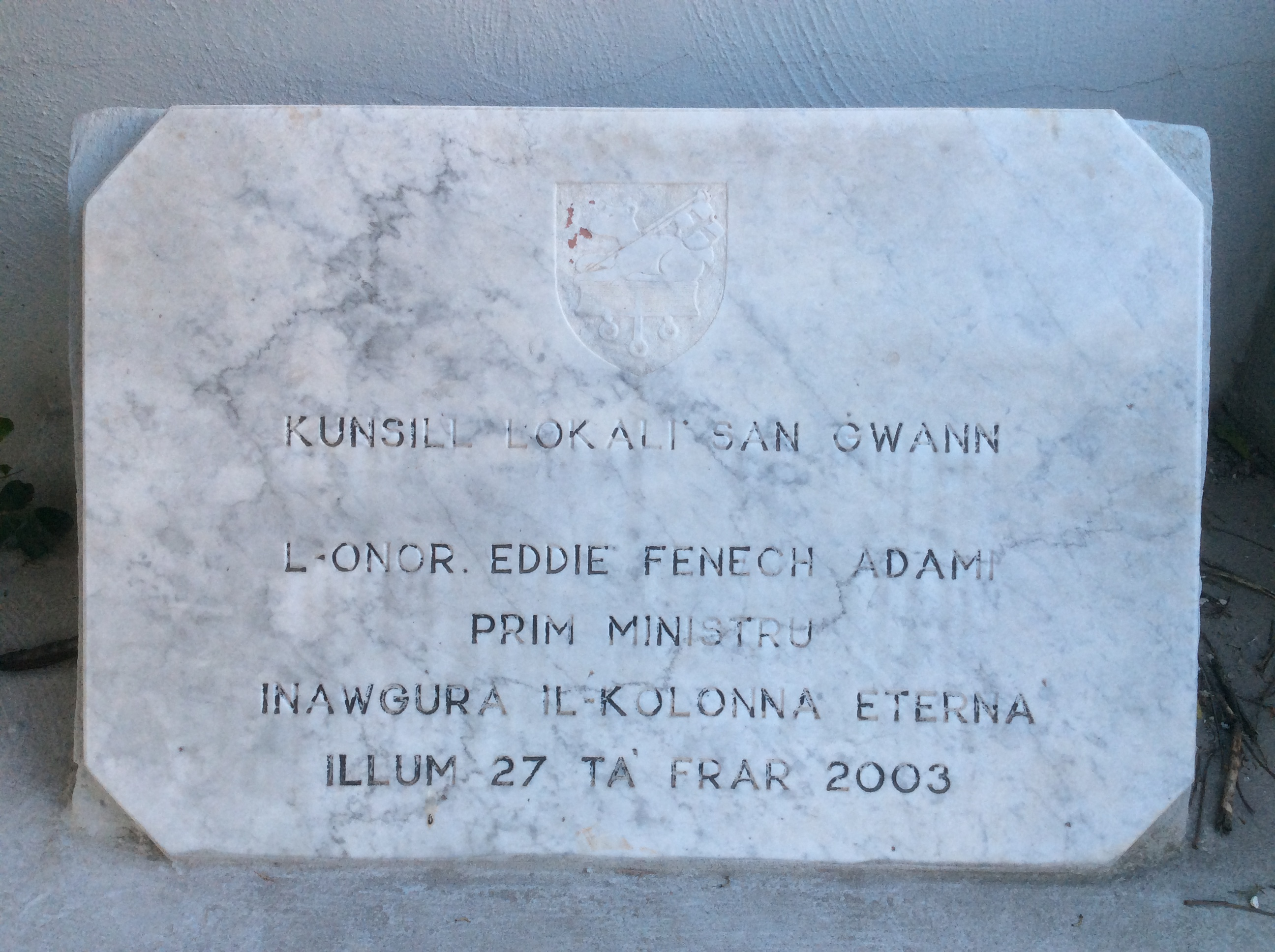
Plaque inaugurated by Eddie Fenech Adami

On the plaque uncovered by Eddie Fenech Adami it is written:

Kunsill Lokali San Gwann

L-Onor Eddie Fenech Adami
Prim Ministru
Inawgura il-Kolonna Eterna

Illum 27 ta' Frar, 2003

== See also ==
- Colonna Mediterranea
- Phallic architecture
- Phallus
- Landmarks
- Egyptian obelisk
