= 1977 Petah Tikva bombing =

1977 terrorist attack

- Location: Petah Tikva, Israel
- Date: 6 July 1977
- Attack type: Bombing
- Deaths: 1
- Injuries: 22
- Perpetrators: DFLP, PFLP and Fatah

On 6 July 1977, a pipe bomb placed by Palestinian militants exploded in a vegetable stand in Petah Tikva, Israel, killing one woman and injuring 22 others. The bombing, considered a terrorist attack, was claimed by the Democratic Front for the Liberation of Palestine (DFLP) and Fatah.

== Attack ==
According to police, the bomb consisted of explosives in a metal pipe which was hidden under a fruit vendor's cart on Baron Hirsch Street in the center of town.

== Reaction ==
The bombing at the Petah Tikva marketplace started nationwide alarm, with security forces searching public places for other concealed bombs. Security forces rounded up dozens of Arabs in response. According to a police spokesman, some were held to protect them from angry Israeli stallholders.

== Perpetrators ==
Responsibility for the attack was claimed by the Democratic Front for the Liberation of Palestine (DFLP) and by Fatah.

In 2008, it was reported that the mastermind of the bombing, Said el-Atba of the Popular Front for the Liberation of Palestine (PFLP) was among hundreds set to be released from prison in a "gesture" towards Palestinian President Mahmoud Abbas. The decision was criticized by philharmonic violinist Zinovi Kaplan, whose mother Tzila Galili was killed in the bombing.
