= October 12 =

October 12 this year in various calendars
- Monday, 12 October 2026
Akan	Kwadwo
Armenian	24 Sahmi 1476
Aztec	Izcalli 10, 3 Calli
Babylonian	29 Ululu, 2337 SE
Balinese pawukon	Luang, Pepet, Beteng, Sri, Paing, Was, Coma of Kelawu, Ludra, Tulus, Duka
Bengali	27 Ashshin, BS 1433
Chinese	Yin Earth Goat・Exntended Net Mansion; Fire Horse Year, Month 9, Day 3 (Hanlu, 11 days until Shuangjiang)
Common Era	12 October 2026 CE
Coptic	2 Paopi, AM 1743
Egyptian	29 Mechir, 2775 NE
Ethiopian	2 Ṭeqemt, 2019 Amätä Məhrät
French Republican	Décade II, Décadi de Vendémiaire de l'Année 235 de la République
Gregorian	12 October, AD 2026
Hebrew	1 Cheshvan, AM 5787
Hindu	Svātī・Viṣkambha; Solar: 26 Āśvina, 1948 SE; Lunisolar: Dvitīyā, Śukla pakṣa of Āśvina, 2083 VE; Rāudra・5127 KY・1,872,860
Icelandic	Mánudagur, 19 Haustmánuður 2026
Islamic	29 Rabi' al-thani, AH 1448 (using tabular method)
ISO week date	2026-W42-1
Japanese	2 Nagatsuki, Reiwa 8 (Kanro, 11 days until Sōkō)
Julian	29 September, AD 2026 (AM 7534)
Julian day	2461326
Korean	2 Gaedal, 4359 DE
Maya	13.0.14.0.3; 16 Yax, 3 Akbal
Roman	ante diem III Kalendas Octobres, MMDCCLXXIX AUC
Solar Hijri	20 Mehr, SH 1405
Tibetan	2 tha skar, me pho rta 2153 or 1772 or 1000

<<	October					>>
Su	Mo	Tu	We	Th	Fr	Sa
				1	2	3
4	5	6	7	8	9	10
11	12	13	14	15	16	17
18	19	20	21	22	23	24
25	26	27	28	29	30	31
2026

October 12 in recent years
2026 (Monday)
2025 (Sunday)
2024 (Saturday)
2023 (Thursday)
2022 (Wednesday)
2021 (Tuesday)
2020 (Monday)
2019 (Saturday)
2018 (Friday)
2017 (Thursday)

October 12 is the 285th day of the year (286th in leap years) in the Gregorian calendar; 80 days remain until the end of the year.

== Events ==
=== Pre-1600 ===
- 539 BC – The army of Cyrus the Great of Persia conquer Babylon, ending the Neo-Babylonian Empire. (Julian calendar)
- 166 AD – Roman emperors Marcus Aurelius and Lucius Verus celebrate a triumph in Rome for the successful completion of their war with the Parthians.
- 633 – Battle of Hatfield Chase: King Edwin of Northumbria is defeated and killed by an alliance under Penda of Mercia and Cadwallon of Gwynedd.
- 1279 – The Nichiren Shōshū branch of Buddhism is founded in Japan.
- 1398 – In the Treaty of Salynas, Lithuania cedes Samogitia to the Teutonic Knights.
- 1406 – Chen Yanxiang, the only person from Indonesia known to have visited dynastic Korea, reaches Seoul after having set out from Java four months before.
- 1428 – The English and their Burgundian allies begin the Siege of Orleans, the most pivotal investiture of the Hundred Years' War.
- 1492 – Christopher Columbus's first expedition makes landfall on San Salvador Island in the Caribbean. (Julian calendar)

=== 1601–1900 ===
- 1654 – The Delft Explosion devastates the city in the Netherlands, killing more than 100 people.
- 1692 – The Salem witch trials are ended by a letter from Province of Massachusetts Bay Governor William Phips.
- 1748 – War of Jenkins' Ear: A British squadron wins a tactical victory over a Spanish squadron off Havana.
- 1773 – America's first insane asylum opens.
- 1792 – The first celebration of Columbus Day is held in New York City.
- 1793 – The cornerstone of Old East, the oldest state university building in the United States, is laid at the University of North Carolina at Chapel Hill.
- 1798 – Flemish and Luxembourgish peasants launch the rebellion against French rule known as the Peasants' War.
- 1799 – Jeanne Geneviève Labrosse becomes the first woman to jump from a balloon with a parachute.
- 1810 – The citizens of Munich hold the first Oktoberfest in celebration of the marriage of Crown Prince Louis of Bavaria and Princess Therese of Saxe-Hildburghausen.
- 1822 – Pedro I of Brazil is proclaimed the emperor.
- 1849 – The city of Manizales, Colombia, is founded by 'The Expedition of the 20'.
- 1856 – An M 7.7–8.3 earthquake off the Greek island of Crete causes major damage as far as Egypt and Malta.
- 1871 – The British in India enact the Criminal Tribes Act, naming many local communities "Criminal Tribes".
- 1890 – Uddevalla Suffrage Association is formed.
- 1892 – The Pledge of Allegiance is first recited by students in many US public schools.

=== 1901–present ===
- 1901 – President Theodore Roosevelt officially renames the "Executive Mansion" to the White House.
- 1909 – Foundation of Coritiba Foot Ball Club.
- 1915 – World War I: British nurse Edith Cavell is executed by a German firing squad for helping Allied soldiers escape from occupied Belgium.
- 1917 – World War I: The First Battle of Passchendaele takes place resulting in the largest single-day loss of life in New Zealand history.
- 1918 – A massive forest fire kills 453 people in Minnesota.
- 1928 – An iron lung respirator is used for the first time at Boston Children's Hospital.
- 1933 – The military Alcatraz Citadel becomes the civilian Alcatraz Federal Penitentiary.
- 1944 – World War II: The Axis occupation of Athens comes to an end.
- 1945 – World War II: Desmond Doss is the first conscientious objector to receive the U.S. Medal of Honor.
- 1945 – The Lao Issara took control of Laos' government and reaffirmed the country's independence.
- 1959 – At the national congress of the American Popular Revolutionary Alliance in Peru, a group of leftist radicals are expelled from the party who later form APRA Rebelde.
- 1960 – Soviet Premier Nikita Khrushchev pounds his shoe on a desk at the United Nations to protest a Philippine assertion.
- 1962 – The Columbus Day Storm strikes the U.S. Pacific Northwest with record wind velocities. There was at least U.S. $230 million in damages and 46 people died.
- 1963 – After nearly 23 years of imprisonment, Reverend Walter Ciszek, a Jesuit missionary, was released from the Soviet Union.
- 1964 – The Soviet Union launches the Voskhod 1 into Earth orbit as the first spacecraft with a multi-person crew, and the first flight without pressure suits.
- 1967 – A bomb explodes on board Cyprus Airways Flight 284 while flying over the Mediterranean Sea, killing 66.
- 1968 – Equatorial Guinea becomes independent from Spain.
- 1970 – Vietnam War: Vietnamization continues as President Richard Nixon announces that the United States will withdraw 40,000 more troops before Christmas.
- 1971 – The 2,500 year celebration of the Persian Empire begins.
- 1973 – President Nixon nominates House Minority Leader Gerald R. Ford as the successor to Vice President Spiro T. Agnew.
- 1976 – Indian Airlines Flight 171 crashes at Santacruz Airport in Bombay, India, killing 95.
- 1977 – Hua Guofeng succeeds Mao Zedong as paramount leader of China.
- 1979 – Typhoon Tip becomes the largest and most intense tropical cyclone ever recorded.
- 1983 – Japan's former Prime Minister Tanaka Kakuei is found guilty of taking a $2 million bribe from the Lockheed Corporation, and is sentenced to four years in jail.
- 1984 – The Provisional Irish Republican Army fail to assassinate Prime Minister Margaret Thatcher and her cabinet. The bomb kills five people and wounds at least 31 others.
- 1988 – Two officers of the Victoria Police are gunned down execution-style in the Walsh Street police shootings, Australia.
- 1992 – A 5.8 earthquake occurred in Cairo, Egypt. At least 510 died.
- 1994 – The Magellan spacecraft burns up in the atmosphere of Venus.
- 1994 – Iran Aseman Airlines Flight 746 crashes near Natanz, Iran, killing all 66 people on board.
- 1996 – New Zealand holds its first general election under the new mixed-member proportional representation system, which led to Jim Bolger's National Party forming a coalition government with Winston Peters's New Zealand First.
- 1997 – The Sidi Daoud massacre in Algeria kills 43 people at a fake roadblock.
- 1999 – Pervez Musharraf takes power in Pakistan from Nawaz Sharif through a bloodless coup.
- 1999 – The former Autonomous Soviet Republic of Abkhazia declares its independence from Georgia.
- 2000 – The USS Cole, a US Navy destroyer, is badly damaged by two al-Qaeda suicide bombers, killing 17 crew members and wounding at least 39.
- 2000 – Two Israeli reservists are lynched by a Palestinian mob at the police station of Ramallah.
- 2002 – Terrorists detonate bombs in two nightclubs in Kuta, Bali, Indonesia, killing 202 and wounding over 200.
- 2005 – The second Chinese human spaceflight, Shenzhou 6, is launched, carrying two cosmonauts in orbit for five days.
- 2010 – The Finnish Yle TV2 channel's Ajankohtainen kakkonen current affairs program airs controversial Homoilta episode (literally "gay night"), which leads to the resignation of almost 50,000 Finns from the Evangelical Lutheran Church.
- 2012 – The European Union wins the 2012 Nobel Peace Prize.
- 2013 – An apartment building collapse in Medellín, Colombia results in the deaths of twelve people.
- 2017 – The United States announces its decision to withdraw from UNESCO. Israel immediately follows.
- 2019 – Typhoon Hagibis makes landfall in Japan, killing 10 and forcing the evacuation of one million people.
- 2019 – Eliud Kipchoge from Kenya becomes the first person to run a marathon in less than two hours with a time of 1:59:40 in Vienna.
- 2019 – The Hard Rock Hotel in New Orleans, which is under construction, collapses, killing three workers and injuring 30 others.
- 2022 – 2022 Bratislava shooting occurs outside a gay bar, killing 3 (including the perpetrator) and injuring one.

== Births ==
=== Pre-1600 ===
- 1008 – Go-Ichijō, emperor of Japan (died 1036)
- 1240 – Trần Thánh Tông, emperor of Vietnam (then Đại Việt) (died 1290)
- 1350 – Dmitri Donskoi, Grand Duke of Moscow (died 1389)
- 1490 – Bernardo Pisano, Italian composer and priest (died 1548)
- 1533 – Asakura Yoshikage, Japanese ruler (died 1573)
- 1537 – Edward VI, king of England (died 1553)
- 1555 – Peregrine Bertie, 13th Baron Willoughby de Eresby, English diplomat (died 1601)
- 1558 – Maximilian III, Archduke of Austria (died 1618)
- 1559 – Jacques Sirmond, French scholar and Jesuit (died 1651)
- 1576 – Thomas Dudley, English-American soldier and politician, 3rd Governor of the Massachusetts Bay Colony (died 1653)

=== 1601–1900 ===
- 1602 – William Chillingworth, English scholar and theologian (died 1644)
- 1614 – Henry More, English philosopher (died 1687)
- 1687 – Sylvius Leopold Weiss, German lute player and composer (died 1750)
- 1710 – Jonathan Trumbull, American colonel and politician, 16th Governor of Connecticut (died 1785)
- 1725 – Étienne Louis Geoffroy, French pharmacist and entomologist (died 1810)
- 1792 – Christian Gmelin, German chemist and pharmacist (died 1860)
- 1798 – Pedro I, emperor of Brazil (died 1834)
- 1801 – Friedrich Frey-Herosé, Swiss lawyer and politician, 5th President of the Swiss Confederation (died 1873)
- 1815 – William J. Hardee, American general (died 1873)
- 1826 – Kathinka Kraft, Norwegian memoirist (died 1895)
- 1838 – George Thorn, Australian politician, 6th Premier of Queensland (died 1905)
- 1840 – Helena Modjeska, Polish-American actress (died 1909)
- 1855 – Arthur Nikisch, Hungarian conductor and academic (died 1922)
- 1860 – Elmer Ambrose Sperry, American engineer and businessman, co-invented the gyrocompass (died 1930)
- 1864 – Kamini Roy, British India's first female graduate, Bengali poet, social activist, and feminist writer (died 1933)
- 1865 – Arthur Harden, English biochemist and academic, Nobel Prize laureate (died 1940)
- 1866 – Ramsay MacDonald, Scottish journalist and politician, Prime Minister of the United Kingdom (died 1937)
- 1868 – August Horch, German engineer and businessman, founded Audi (died 1951)
- 1868 – Mariano Trías, Filipino general and politician, 1st Vice President of the Philippines (died 1914)
- 1872 – Ralph Vaughan Williams, English composer and educator (died 1958)
- 1874 – Jimmy Burke, American baseball player and manager (died 1942)
- 1875 – Aleister Crowley, English magician and author (died 1947)
- 1878 – Truxtun Hare, American football player and hammer thrower (died 1956)
- 1880 – Louis Hémon, French-Canadian author (died 1913)
- 1880 – Kullervo Manner, Finnish Speaker of the Parliament, the Prime Minister of the FSWR and the Supreme Commander of the Red Guards (died 1939)
- 1882 – Pete Hill, American baseball player
- 1889 – Dietrich von Hildebrand, German Catholic philosopher and author (died 1977)
- 1891 – Edith Stein, Polish nun and martyr; later canonized (died 1942)
- 1891 – Fumimaro Konoe, Japanese soldier and politician, 39th Prime Minister of Japan (died 1945)
- 1892 – Gilda dalla Rizza, Italian soprano and actress (died 1975)
- 1893 – Velvalee Dickinson, American spy (died 1980)
- 1894 – Elisabeth of Romania, queen consort of Greece (died 1956)
- 1896 – Eugenio Montale, Italian poet and translator, Nobel Prize laureate (died 1981)

=== 1901–present ===
- 1903 – Josephine Hutchinson, American actress (died 1998)
- 1904 – Lester Dent, American journalist and author (died 1959)
- 1904 – Anthony F. DePalma, American orthopedic surgeon and professor (died 2005)
- 1904 – Ding Ling, Chinese author and educator (died 1986)
- 1905 – Rick Ferrell, American baseball player (died 1995)
- 1906 – Joe Cronin, American baseball player and manager (died 1984)
- 1906 – John Murray, American playwright and producer (died 1984)
- 1906 – Piero Taruffi, Italian race car driver and motorcycle racer (died 1988)
- 1908 – Paul Engle, American novelist, poet, playwright, and critic (died 1991)
- 1908 – Ann Petry, American novelist (died 1997)
- 1909 – Dorothy Livesay, Canadian poet (died 1996)
- 1910 – Robert Fitzgerald, American poet, critic, and translator (died 1985)
- 1910 – Malcolm Renfrew, American chemist and academic (died 2013)
- 1911 – Vijay Merchant, Indian cricketer (died 1987)
- 1912 – Muhammad Shamsul Huq, Bangladeshi academic and former Minister of Foreign Affairs (died 2006)
- 1913 – Alice Chetwynd Ley, English author and educator (died 2004)
- 1914 – John E. Hodge, African-American chemist (died 1996)
- 1916 – Alice Childress, American actress and playwright (died 1994)
- 1916 – Lock Martin, American actor (died 1959)
- 1917 – Roque Máspoli, Uruguayan footballer and manager (died 2004)
- 1917 – James Phillip McAuley, Australian Poet (died 1976)
- 1919 – Gilles Beaudoin, Canadian politician, 34th Mayor of Trois-Rivières (died 2007)
- 1919 – Doris Miller, American cook and soldier (died 1943)
- 1920 – Christopher Soames, English politician and diplomat, Governor of Southern Rhodesia (died 1987)
- 1920 – Steve Conway, British singer (died 1952)
- 1921 – Art Clokey, American animator, producer, screenwriter, and voice actor, created Gumby (died 2010)
- 1921 – Jaroslav Drobný, Czech-English tennis player and ice hockey player (died 2001)
- 1921 – Logie Bruce Lockhart, Scottish rugby player and journalist (died 2020)
- 1922 – William H. Sullivan, American soldier and diplomat, United States Ambassador to the Philippines (died 2013)
- 1923 – Jean Nidetch, American businesswoman, co-founded Weight Watchers (died 2015)
- 1923 – Goody Petronelli, American boxer, trainer, and manager (died 2012)
- 1924 – Leonidas Kyrkos, Greek politician (died 2011)
- 1925 – Denis Lazure, Canadian psychiatrist and politician (died 2008)
- 1926 – Eliška Misáková, Czech gymnast (died 1948)
- 1928 – Al Held, American painter and academic (died 2005)
- 1928 – Domna Samiou, Greek singer and musicologist (died 2012)
- 1929 – Nappy Brown, American R&B singer-songwriter (died 2008)
- 1929 – Robert Coles, American psychologist, author, and academic (died 2026)
- 1929 – Magnus Magnusson, Icelandic journalist and academic (died 2007)
- 1930 – Denis Brodeur, Canadian ice hockey player and photographer (died 2013)
- 1930 – Milica Kacin Wohinz, Slovenian historian and author (died 2021)
- 1931 – Ole-Johan Dahl, Norwegian computer scientist and academic, co-developed Simula (died 2002)
- 1932 – Dick Gregory, American comedian, actor, and author (died 2017)
- 1932 – Ned Jarrett, American race car driver and sportscaster (died 2026)
- 1933 – Guido Molinari, Canadian painter and art collector (died 2004)
- 1934 – James "Sugar Boy" Crawford, American singer-songwriter and pianist (died 2012)
- 1934 – Richard Meier, American architect, designed the Getty Center and City Tower
- 1934 – Albert Shiryaev, Russian mathematician and academic
- 1934 – Oğuz Atay, Turkish engineer and author (died 1977)
- 1934 – Constantine Manos, Greek-born American photographer (died 2025)
- 1935 – Don Howe, English footballer and manager (died 2015)
- 1935 – Tony Kubek, American baseball player and sportscaster
- 1935 – Sam Moore, American soul singer-songwriter (died 2025)
- 1935 – Shivraj Patil, Indian lawyer and politician, Indian Minister of Defence
- 1935 – Luciano Pavarotti, Italian tenor and actor (died 2007)
- 1937 – Paul Hawkins, Australian race car driver (died 1969)
- 1937 – Robert Mangold, American painter
- 1941 – Michael Mansfield, English lawyer, academic, and republican
- 1942 – Melvin Franklin, American soul bass singer (died 1995)
- 1943 – Kostas Tsakonas, Greek actor (died 2015)
- 1943 – Lin Shaye, American actress
- 1944 – Angela Rippon, English journalist and author
- 1944 – Jack Marin, American basketball player
- 1945 – Aurore Clément, French actress
- 1945 – Dusty Rhodes, American wrestler (died 2015)
- 1946 – Drew Edmondson, American politician
- 1946 – Ashok Mankad, Indian cricketer (died 2008)
- 1946 – Daryl Runswick, English bassist and composer
- 1947 – Chris Wallace, American journalist
- 1948 – John Engler, American businessman and politician, 46th Governor of Michigan
- 1948 – Rick Parfitt, English singer-songwriter and guitarist (died 2016)
- 1949 – Dave Lloyd, English cyclist and coach
- 1949 – Carlos the Jackal, Venezuelan terrorist
- 1949 – Barclay Shaw, American artist
- 1949 – Paul Went, English footballer and manager (died 2017)
- 1950 – Susan Anton, American actress and model
- 1950 – Dave Freudenthal, American economist and politician, 31st Governor of Wyoming
- 1951 – Sally Little, South African-American golfer
- 1951 – Ed Royce, American businessman and politician
- 1951 – Norio Suzuki, Japanese golfer
- 1952 – Trevor Chappell, Australian cricketer and coach
- 1952 – Béla Csécsei, Hungarian educator and politician (died 2012)
- 1952 – Roger Heath-Brown, English mathematician and theorist
- 1953 – Les Dennis, English comedian and actor
- 1953 – David Threlfall, English actor and director
- 1954 – Evalie A. Bradley, Anguillian politician and member of the House of Assembly of Anguilla
- 1954 – Massimo Ghini, Italian actor
- 1954 – Michael Roe, American singer, songwriter, and record producer
- 1954 – Linval Thompson, Jamaican singer and producer
- 1955 – Einar Jan Aas, Norwegian footballer
- 1955 – Pat DiNizio, American singer-songwriter and guitarist (died 2017)
- 1955 – Ante Gotovina, Croatian general
- 1955 – Jane Siberry, Canadian singer-songwriter and producer
- 1956 – Rafael Ábalos, Spanish author
- 1956 – Allan Evans, Scottish footballer
- 1956 – Lutz Haueisen, German cyclist
- 1956 – Catherine Holmes, Australian judge
- 1956 – Gerti Schanderl, German figure skater
- 1956 – David Vanian, English singer-songwriter
- 1957 – Clémentine Célarié, French actress, singer, and director
- 1957 – Serge Clerc, French comic book artist and illustrator
- 1957 – Mike Dowler, Welsh footballer
- 1957 – Annik Honoré, Belgian journalist and music promoter (died 2014)
- 1957 – William F. Laurance, Australian biologist
- 1958 – Steve Austria, American lawyer and politician
- 1958 – Maria de Fátima Silva de Sequeira Dias, Portuguese historian, author, and academic (died 2013)
- 1958 – Jeff Keith, American rock singer-songwriter
- 1958 – Bryn Merrick, Welsh bass player (died 2015)
- 1959 – Anna Escobedo Cabral, American lawyer and politician, 42nd Treasurer of the United States
- 1960 – Steve Lowery, American golfer
- 1960 – Carlo Perrone, Italian footballer and manager
- 1960 – Hiroyuki Sanada, Japanese actor and martial artist
- 1960 – Dorothee Vieth, German Paralympic cyclist
- 1961 – Chendo, Spanish footballer
- 1962 – Carlos Bernard, American actor and director
- 1962 – Michelle Botes, South African actress (died 2024)
- 1962 – Chris Botti, American trumpet player and composer
- 1962 – John Coleman, English footballer and manager
- 1962 – Branko Crvenkovski, Macedonian engineer and politician, 3rd President of the Republic of Macedonia
- 1962 – Deborah Foreman, American actress and photographer
- 1962 – Mads Eriksen, Norwegian guitarist and composer
- 1963 – Raimond Aumann, German footballer
- 1963 – Hideki Fujisawa, Japanese composer
- 1963 – Satoshi Kon, Japanese animator and screenwriter (died 2010)
- 1963 – Dave Legeno, English actor and mixed martial artist (died 2014)
- 1963 – Alan McDonald, Irish footballer and manager (died 2012)
- 1963 – Luis Polonia, Dominican baseball player
- 1965 – Dan Abnett, English author
- 1965 – Chris Chandler, American football player
- 1965 – J. J. Daigneault, Canadian ice hockey player and coach
- 1965 – Scott O'Grady, American captain and pilot
- 1966 – Jonathan Crombie, Canadian actor and voice over artist (died 2015)
- 1966 – Wim Jonk, Dutch footballer
- 1966 – Brian Kennedy, Northern Irish singer-songwriter and guitarist
- 1966 – Brenda Romero, American game designer
- 1967 – Becky Iverson, American golfer
- 1968 – Bill Auberlen, American race car driver
- 1968 – Paul Harragon, Australian rugby league player and sportscaster
- 1968 – Hugh Jackman, Australian actor, singer, and producer
- 1968 – Leon Lett, American football player
- 1968 – Adam Rich, American actor (died 2023)
- 1969 – Martie Maguire, American singer-songwriter, violinist, and producer
- 1969 – Željko Milinovič, Slovenian footballer
- 1969 – Dwayne Roloson, Canadian ice hockey player and coach
- 1969 – José Valentín, American baseball player, coach, and manager
- 1970 – Kirk Cameron, American actor, screenwriter, and Christian evangelical/anti-evolution activist
- 1970 – Patrick Musimu, Belgian diver and physiotherapist (died 2011)
- 1970 – Tanyon Sturtze, American baseball player
- 1970 – Charlie Ward, American basketball player and coach
- 1971 – Tony Fiore, American baseball player
- 1971 – Steve Johnston, Australian motorcycle racer
- 1971 – Bronzell Miller, American football player and actor (died 2013)
- 1972 – Juan Manuel Silva, Argentinian race car driver
- 1972 – Tom Van Mol, Belgian footballer
- 1973 – Lesli Brea, Dominican baseball player
- 1973 – Martin Corry, English rugby player
- 1974 – Stephen Lee, English snooker player
- 1975 – Susana Félix, Portuguese singer-songwriter, producer, and actress
- 1975 – Marion Jones, American basketball player and runner
- 1975 – Randy Robitaille, Canadian ice hockey player
- 1976 – Simon Bridges, New Zealand politician
- 1977 – Cristie Kerr, American golfer
- 1977 – Bode Miller, American skier
- 1977 – Javier Toyo, Venezuelan footballer
- 1978 – Stefan Binder, German footballer
- 1978 – Baden Cooke, Australian cyclist
- 1978 – Marko Jarić, Serbian basketball player
- 1979 – Steven Agnew, Northern Irish politician
- 1979 – Steve Borthwick, English rugby player and coach
- 1979 – Jordan Pundik, American singer-songwriter and guitarist
- 1980 – Ledley King, English footballer
- 1980 – Ann Wauters, Belgian basketball player
- 1981 – Tom Guiry, American actor
- 1981 – Marcel Hossa, Slovak ice hockey player
- 1981 – Brian Kerr, Scottish footballer and manager
- 1981 – Giuseppe Lanzone, American rower
- 1981 – Brian J. Smith, American actor
- 1981 – Conrad Smith, New Zealand rugby player
- 1981 – Sun Tiantian, Chinese tennis player
- 1983 – Alex Brosque, Australian footballer
- 1983 – Carlton Cole, English footballer
- 1983 – Katie Piper, English philanthropist, broadcaster, and acid violence survivor
- 1983 – Mariko Yamamoto, Japanese cricketer
- 1985 – Michelle Carter, American shot putter
- 1985 – Mike Green, Canadian hockey player
- 1985 – Anna Iljuštšenko, Estonian high jumper
- 1985 – Greig Laidlaw, Scottish rugby player
- 1985 – Carl Söderberg, Swedish ice hockey player
- 1986 – Ioannis Maniatis, Greek footballer
- 1986 – Sergio Peter, German footballer
- 1986 – Cristhian Stuani, Uruguayan footballer
- 1986 – Tyler Blackburn, American actor
- 1987 – Marvin Ogunjimi, Belgian footballer
- 1988 – Sam Whitelock, New Zealand rugby player
- 1988 – Calum Scott, British singer
- 1989 – Anna Ohmiya, Japanese curler
- 1990 – Henri Lansbury, English footballer
- 1991 – Nicolao Dumitru, Italian footballer
- 1992 – Josh Hutcherson, American actor and producer
- 1993 – Ketel Marte, Dominican baseball player
- 1993 – Jake McCabe, American ice hockey player
- 1994 – Sean Monahan, Canadian ice hockey player
- 1994 – Olivia Smoliga, American swimmer
- 1995 – Jessica Hogg, Welsh artistic gymnast
- 1996 – James Graham, British singer
- 1996 – Owen Watkin, Welsh rugby player
- 1997 – Curtis Scott, Australian rugby league player
- 1999 – Ferdia Walsh-Peelo, Irish actor and musician
- 2000 – Jongho, South Korean singer and actor
- 2000 – Mia Threapleton, British actress
- 2001 – Brett Cooper, American political commentator, actress, and social media personality
- 2002 – Iris Apatow, American actress
- 2004 – Darci Lynne, American ventriloquist

== Deaths ==
=== Pre-1600 ===
- 322 BC – Demosthenes, Athenian statesman, (born 384 BC)
- 638 – Honorius I, pope of the Catholic Church
- 642 – John IV, pope of the Catholic Church
- 884 – Tsunesada, Japanese prince (born 825)
- 974 – Al-Muti, Abbasid caliph (born 913/14)
- 1095 – Leopold II, margrave of Austria (born 1050)
- 1152 – Adolf III of Berg, German nobleman (born 1080)
- 1176 – William d'Aubigny, 1st Earl of Arundel, English politician (born 1109)
- 1320 – Michael IX Palaiologos, Byzantine emperor (born 1277)
- 1328 – Clementia of Hungary, queen consort of France and Navarre (born 1293)
- 1448 – Zhu Quan, Chinese prince, historian and playwright (born 1378)
- 1491 – Fritz Herlen, German painter (born 1449)
- 1492 – Piero della Francesca, Italian mathematician and painter (born 1415)
- 1565 – Jean Ribault, French-American lieutenant and navigator (born 1520)
- 1576 – Maximilian II, Holy Roman Emperor (born 1527)
- 1590 – Kanō Eitoku, Japanese painter and educator (born 1543)
- 1600 – Luis de Molina, Spanish priest and philosopher (born 1535)

=== 1601–1900 ===
- 1601 – Nicholas Brend, English landowner (born 1560)
- 1632 – Kutsuki Mototsuna, Japanese commander (born 1549)
- 1646 – François de Bassompierre, French general and courtier (born 1579)
- 1654 – Carel Fabritius, Dutch painter (born 1622)
- 1678 – Edmund Berry Godfrey, English lawyer and judge (born 1621)
- 1679 – William Gurnall, English minister, theologian, and author (born 1617)
- 1685 – Christoph Ignaz Abele, Austrian lawyer and jurist (born 1628)
- 1730 – Frederick IV, king of Denmark and Norway (born 1671)
- 1758 – Richard Molesworth, 3rd Viscount Molesworth, Irish field marshal and politician (born 1680)
- 1812 – Juan José Castelli, Argentinian lawyer and politician (born 1764)
- 1828 – Ioan Nicolidi of Pindus, Aromanian physician and noble (born 1737)
- 1845 – Elizabeth Fry, English prison reformer, Quaker and philanthropist (born 1780)
- 1858 – Hiroshige, Japanese painter (born 1797)
- 1870 – Robert E. Lee, American general (born 1807)
- 1875 – Jean-Baptiste Carpeaux, French sculptor and painter (born 1827)
- 1896 – Christian Emil Krag-Juel-Vind-Frijs, Danish lawyer and politician, 9th Council President of Denmark (born 1817)
- 1898 – Calvin Fairbank, American minister and activist (born 1816)

=== 1901–present ===
- 1914 – Margaret E. Knight, American inventor (born 1838)
- 1915 – Edith Cavell, English nurse (born 1865)
- 1923 – Bunny Lucas, English cricketer (born 1857)
- 1924 – Anatole France, French journalist, novelist, and poet, Nobel Prize laureate (born 1844)
- 1926 – Edwin Abbott Abbott, English theologian and author (born 1838)
- 1933 – John Lister, English philanthropist and politician (born 1847)
- 1940 – Tom Mix, American actor, director, producer, and screenwriter (born 1880)
- 1946 – Joseph Stilwell, American general (born 1883)
- 1948 – Susan Sutherland Isaacs, English psychologist and psychoanalyst (born 1885)
- 1954 – George Welch, American soldier and pilot (born 1918)
- 1956 – Lorenzo Perosi, Italian composer and painter (born 1872)
- 1957 – Arie de Jong, Indonesian-Dutch linguist and physician (born 1865)
- 1958 – Gordon Griffith, American actor, director, and producer (born 1907)
- 1960 – Inejiro Asanuma, Japanese lawyer and politician (born 1898)
- 1965 – Paul Hermann Müller, Swiss chemist and academic, Nobel Prize laureate (born 1899)
- 1967 – Ram Manohar Lohia, Indian activist and politician (born 1910)
- 1969 – Sonja Henie, Norwegian figure skater and actress (born 1912)
- 1969 – Serge Poliakoff, Russian-French painter and academic (born 1906)
- 1969 – Julius Saaristo, Finnish javelin thrower and soldier (born 1891)
- 1970 – Feodor Stepanovich Rojankovsky, Russian-American illustrator and painter (born 1891)
- 1970 – Mustafa Zaidi, Pakistani poet and academic (born 1930)
- 1971 – Dean Acheson, American lawyer and politician, 51st United States Secretary of State (born 1893)
- 1971 – Gene Vincent, American musician (born 1935)
- 1972 – Robert Le Vigan, French-Argentinian actor and politician (born 1900)
- 1973 – Peter Aufschnaiter, Austrian mountaineer, geographer, and cartographer (born 1899)
- 1978 – Nancy Spungen, American figure of the 1970s punk rock scene (born 1958)
- 1984 – Anthony Berry, English politician (born 1925)
- 1985 – Johnny Olson, American radio host and game show announcer (born 1910)
- 1985 – Ricky Wilson, American singer-songwriter and guitarist (born 1953)
- 1987 – Alf Landon, American lieutenant and politician, 26th Governor of Kansas (born 1887)
- 1987 – Fahri Korutürk, Turkish commander and politician, 6th President of Turkey (born 1903)
- 1988 – Ruth Manning-Sanders, Welsh-English poet and author (born 1886)
- 1988 – Coby Whitmore, American painter and illustrator (born 1913)
- 1989 – Jay Ward, American animator, producer, and screenwriter, founded Jay Ward Productions (born 1920)
- 1990 – Rifaat el-Mahgoub, Egyptian politician (born 1926)
- 1990 – Peter Wessel Zapffe, Norwegian physician, mountaineer, and author (born 1899)
- 1991 – Sheila Florance, Australian actress (born 1916)
- 1991 – Arkady Strugatsky, Russian author and translator (born 1925)
- 1991 – Regis Toomey, American actor (born 1898)
- 1993 – Leon Ames, American actor (born 1902)
- 1994 – Gérald Godin, Canadian journalist and politician (born 1938)
- 1996 – René Lacoste, French tennis player and fashion designer, co-founded Lacoste (born 1904)
- 1996 – Roger Lapébie, French cyclist (born 1911)
- 1997 – John Denver, American singer-songwriter, guitarist, and actor (born 1943)
- 1998 – Mario Beaulieu, Canadian lawyer and politician (born 1930)
- 1998 – Matthew Shepard, American murder victim (born 1976)
- 1999 – Wilt Chamberlain, American basketball player and coach (born 1936)
- 1999 – Robert Marsden Hope, Australian lawyer and judge (born 1919)
- 2001 – Quintin Hogg, Baron Hailsham of St Marylebone, English academic and politician, Lord High Chancellor of Great Britain (born 1907)
- 2001 – Hikmet Şimşek, Turkish conductor (born 1924)
- 2001 – Richard Buckle, Ballet critic and writer (born 1916)
- 2002 – Ray Conniff, American bandleader and composer (born 1916)
- 2002 – Audrey Mestre, French biologist and diver (born 1974)
- 2002 – Hilaire du Berrier, American-French aviator, mercenary, and writer (born 1906)
- 2003 – Jim Cairns, Australian economist and politician, 4th Deputy Prime Minister of Australia (born 1914)
- 2003 – Joan Kroc, American philanthropist (born 1928)
- 2003 – Bill Shoemaker, American jockey (born 1931)
- 2005 – C. Delores Tucker, American activist and politician (born 1927)
- 2006 – Angelika Machinek, German glider pilot (born 1956)
- 2006 – Eugène Martin, French race car driver (born 1915)
- 2006 – Gillo Pontecorvo, Italian director and screenwriter (born 1919)
- 2006 – Carlo Acutis, Italian programmer, known for his devotion to the Eucharist (born 1991)
- 2007 – Kisho Kurokawa, Japanese architect, designed the Nakagin Capsule Tower (born 1934)
- 2008 – Karl Chircop, Maltese physician and politician (born 1965)
- 2009 – Dickie Peterson American singer-songwriter and bass player (born 1948)
- 2009 – Frank Vandenbroucke, Belgian cyclist (born 1974)
- 2010 – Austin Ardill, Northern Irish soldier and politician (born 1917)
- 2010 – Woody Peoples, American football player (born 1943)
- 2010 – Belva Plain, American author (born 1919)
- 2011 – Patricia Breslin, American actress (born 1931)
- 2011 – Dennis Ritchie, American computer scientist, created the C programming language (born 1941)
- 2012 – James Coyne, Canadian lawyer and banker, 2nd Governor of the Bank of Canada (born 1910)
- 2012 – Norm Grabowski, American hot rod builder and actor (born 1933)
- 2012 – Sukhdev Singh Kang, Indian judge and politician, 14th Governor of Kerala (born 1931)
- 2012 – Torkom Manoogian, Iraqi-Armenian patriarch (born 1919)
- 2012 – Erik Moseholm, Danish bassist, composer, and bandleader (born 1930)
- 2012 – Břetislav Pojar, Czech animator, director, and screenwriter (born 1923)
- 2013 – George Herbig, American astronomer and academic (born 1920)
- 2013 – Oscar Hijuelos, American author and academic (born 1951)
- 2013 – Hans Wilhelm Longva, Norwegian diplomat (born 1942)
- 2013 – Malcolm Renfrew, American chemist and academic (born 1910)
- 2014 – Ali Mazrui, Kenyan-American political scientist, philosopher, and academic (born 1933)
- 2014 – Graham Miles, English snooker player (born 1941)
- 2014 – Roberto Telch, Argentinian footballer and coach (born 1943)
- 2015 – Abdallah Kigoda, Tanzanian politician, 8th Tanzanian Minister of Industry and Trade (born 1953)
- 2015 – Joan Leslie, American actress, dancer, and vaudevillian (born 1925)
- 2017 – Margarita D'Amico, Venezuelan journalist (born 1938)
- 2020 – Conchata Ferrell, American actress (born 1943)
- 2020 – Roberta McCain, American socialite and oil heiress (born 1912)
- 2023 – Luis Garavito, Colombian serial killer (born 1957)
- 2024 – Jackmaster, Scottish DJ and record producer (born 1986)
- 2024 – Ka, American rapper (born 1972)
- 2024 – Lilly Ledbetter, American activist (born 1938)
- 2024 – Tito Mboweni, South African politician (born 1959)
- 2024 – Alvin Rakoff, Canadian film and television director (born 1927)
- 2024 – Alex Salmond, Scottish economist and politician, First Minister of Scotland (born 1954)
- 2024 – Baba Siddique, Indian politician (born 1958)
- 2025 – Jackie Burch, American casting director (born 1951)
- 2026 – RJ Mitte, American actor and producer (born 1992)

== Holidays and observances ==
- Christian feast day:
  - Domnina of Anazarbus
  - Edith Cavell and Elizabeth Fry (Church of England)
  - Fiacc
  - Our Lady of the Pillar (Fiestas del Pilar)
  - Our Lady of Aparecida
  - Blessed Louis Brisson
  - Radim Gaudentius (Czech Republic)
  - Blessed Roman Sitko
  - Seraphin of Montegranaro
  - Thomas Bullaker
  - Wilfrid of Ripon
  - Carlo Acutis
  - October 12 (Eastern Orthodox liturgics)
- Children's Day (Brazil)
- Discovery of America by Columbus-related observances (see also October 8):
  - Columbus Day (Honduras)
  - Día de la Hispanidad or Fiesta Nacional de España, also Armed Forces Day (Spain)
  - Día de la Raza (El Salvador, Uruguay)
  - Día de la Resistencia Indígena, "Day of Indigenous Resistance" (Venezuela)
  - Día de las Américas (Belize)
  - Día de las Culturas, "Day of the Cultures" (Costa Rica)
  - Día del Respeto a la Diversidad Cultural, "Day of respect for cultural diversity" (Argentina)
- Discovery Day (The Bahamas)
- Feast for Life of Aleister Crowley, celebrated as "Crowleymas" (Thelema)
- Fiesta Nacional de España (Spain)
- Hafez Day (Iran) 1
- Independence Day (Equatorial Guinea), celebrates the independence of Equatorial Guinea from Spain in 1968.
- International Day Against DRM
