= New Orleans (disambiguation) =

New Orleans is a city and a metropolitan area in the U.S. state of Louisiana.

New Orleans may also refer to:

== Film ==
- New Orleans (1929 film), an American drama film
- New Orleans (1947 film), a musical

== Music ==
- New Orleans (album), an album by PJ Morton
- New Orleans, an album by Bo Kaspers Orkester
- "New Orleans" (Gary U.S. Bonds song), a 1960 song by Gary U.S. Bonds
- "New Orleans" (Hoagy Carmichael song) (1932)
- "New Orleans", a 2011 song by Emmylou Harris from Hard Bargain
- "New Orleans", a song by Rancid from Let the Dominoes Fall
- "New Orleans", a 2007 song by Kid Rock from Rock n Roll Jesus
- Dixieland or New Orleans jazz, a style of jazz music
- New Orleans blues, a subgenre of blues music and a variation of Louisiana blues

== Watercraft ==
- New Orleans (steamboat)
- CSS New Orleans, a floating gun battery on the Mississippi River in the service of the Confederate States of America
- USS New Orleans, various ships

== Other uses ==
- New Orleans (Rotterdam), a residential skyscraper in Rotterdam, Netherlands
- New Orleans Records, an audio record producing company
- University of New Orleans, a state university in New Orleans
  - New Orleans Privateers, part of the university's athletic program

== See also ==
- Battle of New Orleans (disambiguation)
- City of New Orleans (disambiguation)
