= 2013 =

2013 in various calendars
- Gregorian calendar: 2013; MMXIII
- Ab urbe condita: 2766
- Armenian calendar: 1462; ԹՎ ՌՆԿԲ
- Assyrian calendar: 6763
- Baháʼí calendar: 169–170
- Balinese saka calendar: 1934–1935
- Bengali calendar: 1419–1420
- Berber calendar: 2963
- British Regnal year: 61 Eliz. 2 – 62 Eliz. 2
- Buddhist calendar: 2557
- Burmese calendar: 1375
- Byzantine calendar: 7521–7522
- Chinese calendar: 壬辰年 (Water Dragon); 4710 or 4503 — to — 癸巳年 (Water Snake); 4711 or 4504
- Coptic calendar: 1729–1730
- Discordian calendar: 3179
- Ethiopian calendar: 2005–2006
- Hebrew calendar: 5773–5774
- Hindu calendars
- Vikram Samvat: 2069–2070
- Shaka Samvat: 1934–1935
- Kali Yuga: 5113–5114
- Holocene calendar: 12013
- Igbo calendar: 1013–1014
- Iranian calendar: 1391–1392
- Islamic calendar: 1434–1435
- Japanese calendar: Heisei 25 (平成２５年)
- Javanese calendar: 1946–1947
- Juche calendar: 102
- Julian calendar: Gregorian minus 13 days
- Korean calendar: 4346
- Minguo calendar: ROC 102 民國102年
- Nanakshahi calendar: 545
- Thai solar calendar: 2556
- Tibetan calendar: ཆུ་ཕོ་འབྲུག་ལོ་ (male Water-Dragon); 2139 or 1758 or 986 — to — ཆུ་མོ་སྦྲུལ་ལོ་ (female Water-Snake); 2140 or 1759 or 987
- Unix time: 1356998400 – 1388534399

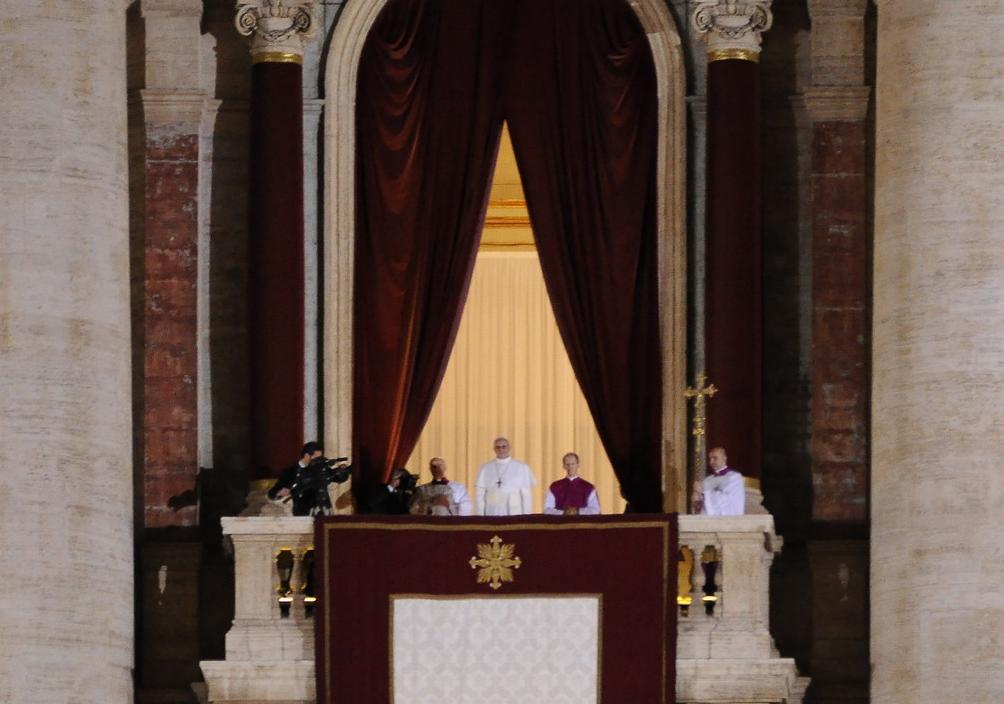
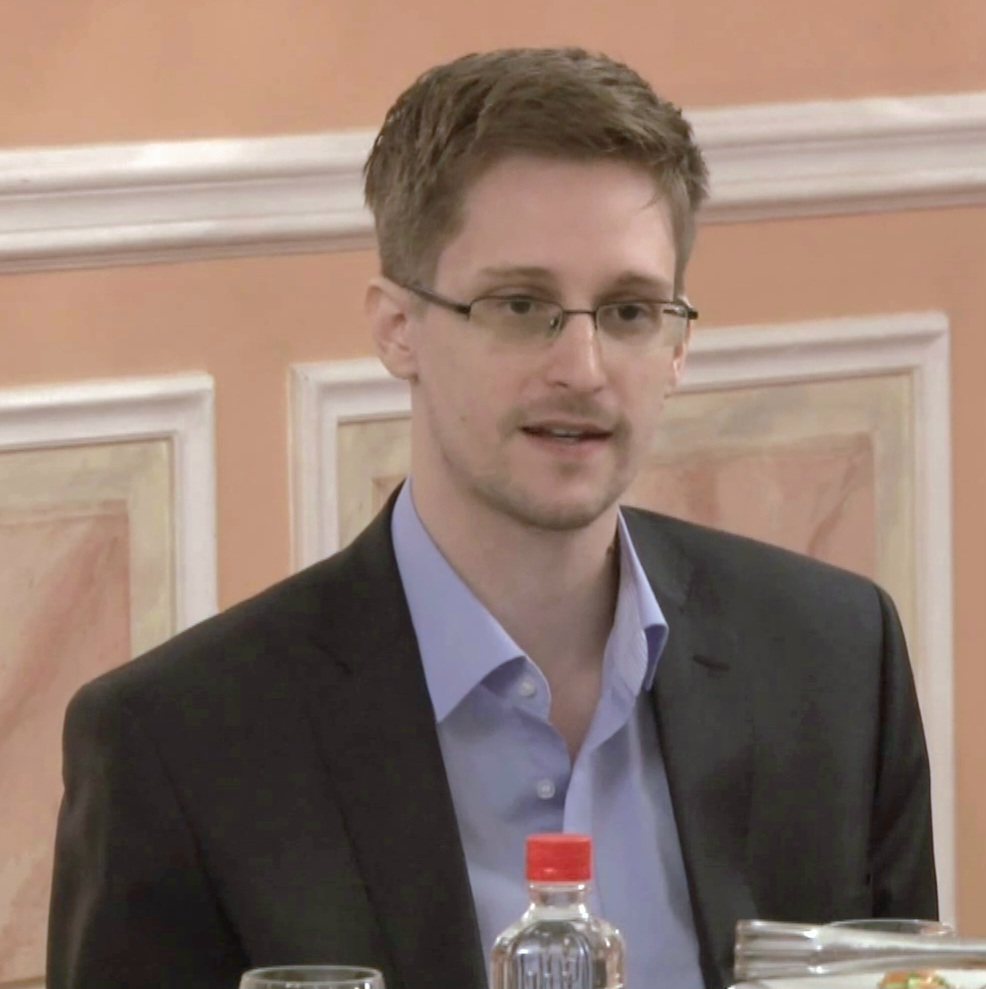
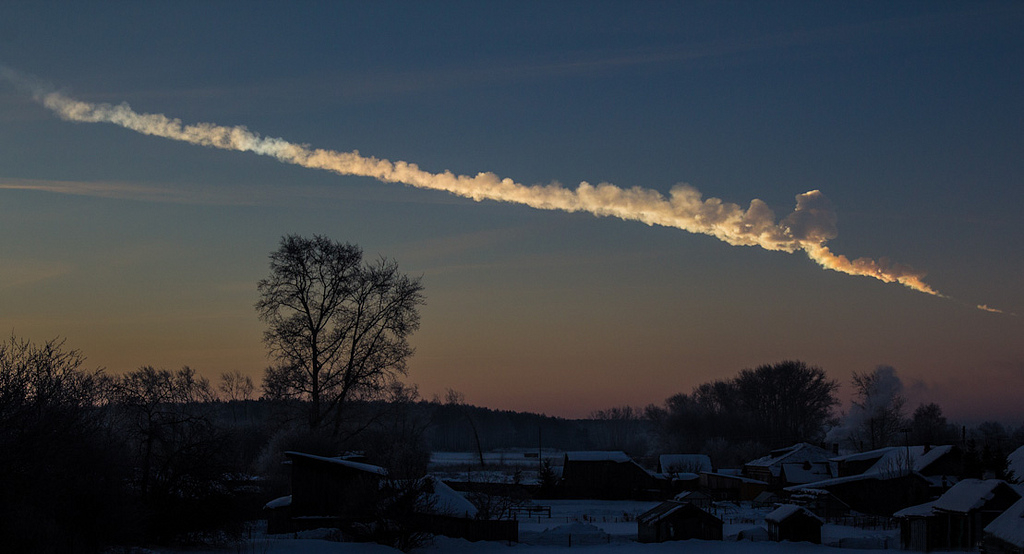
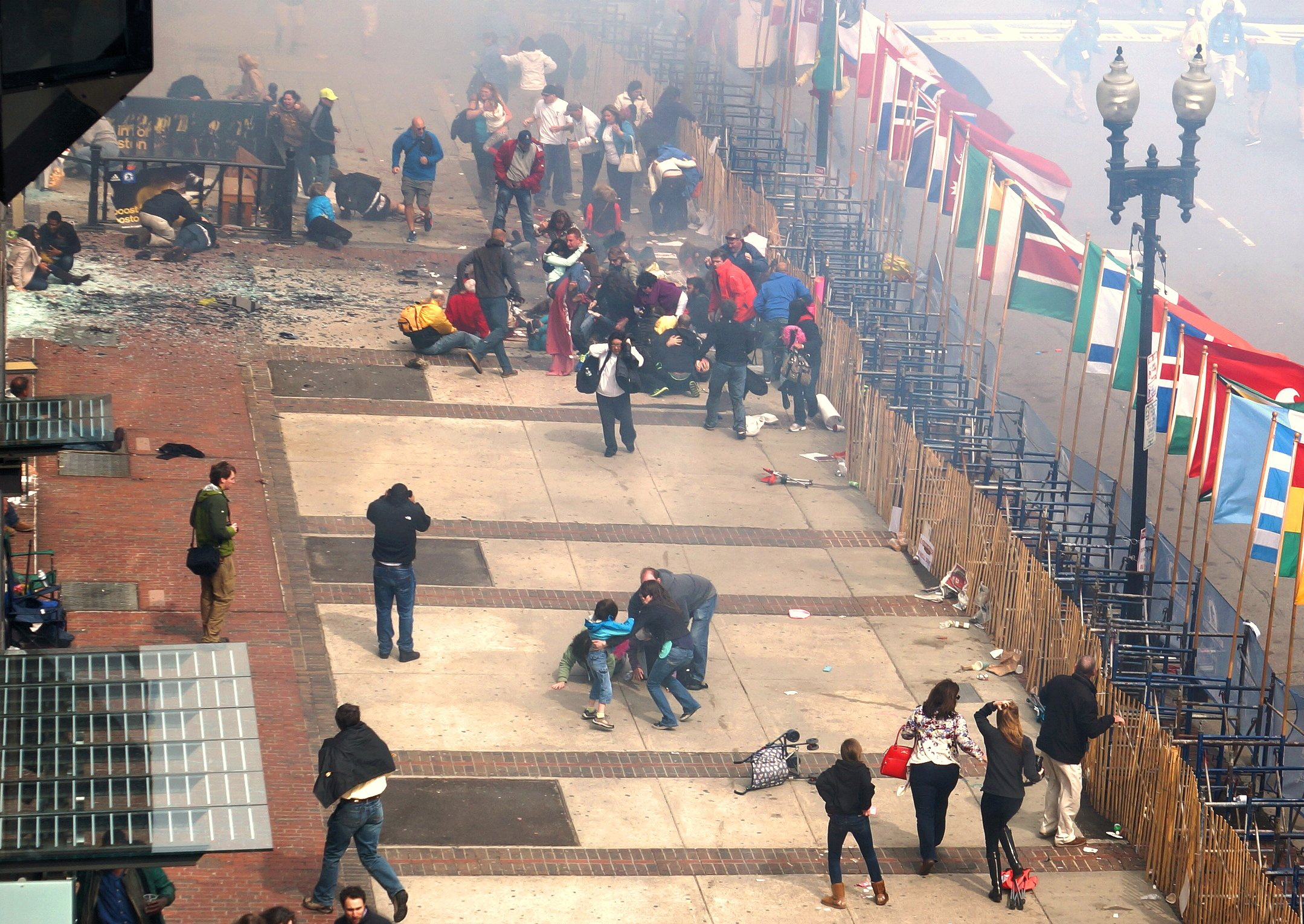
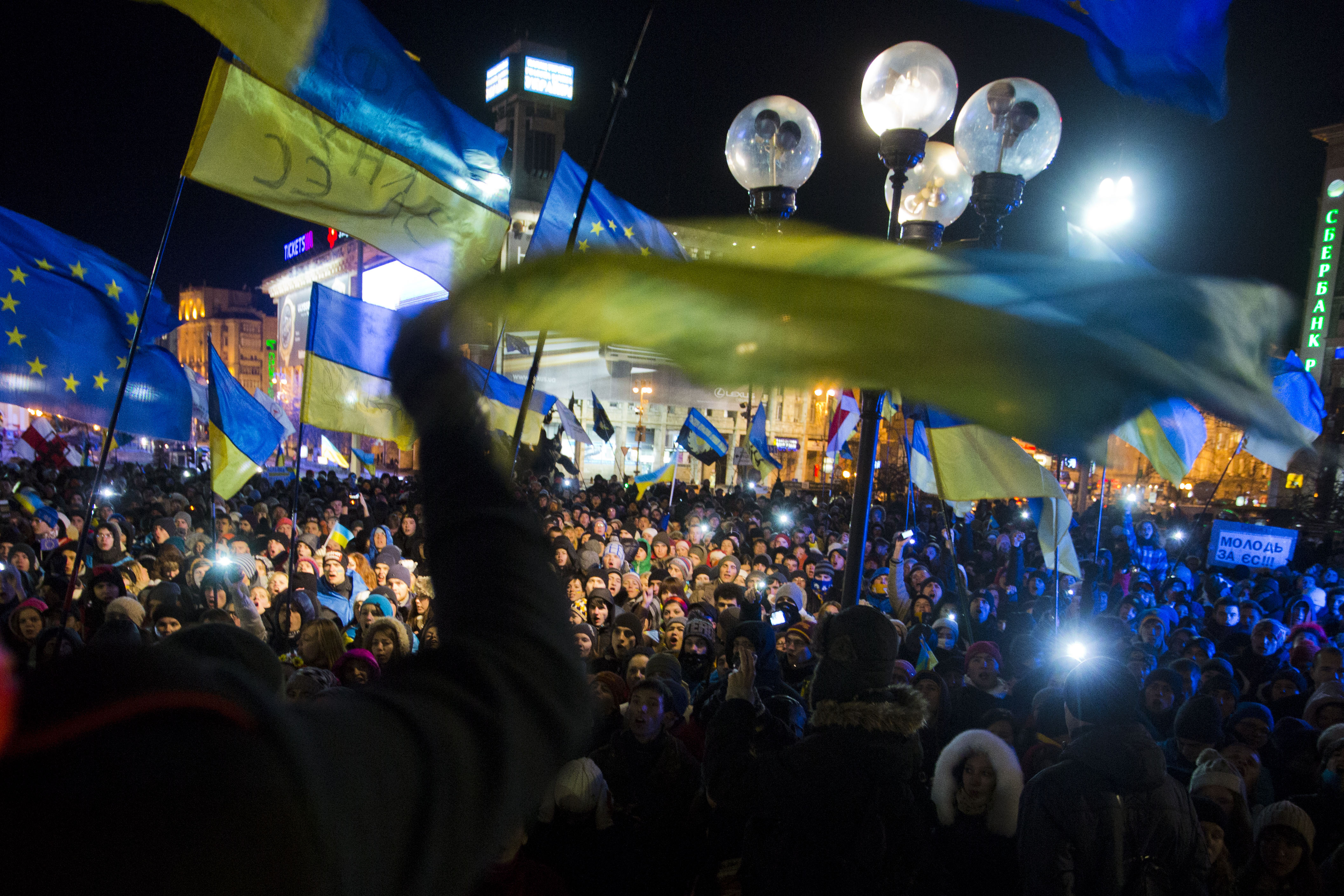
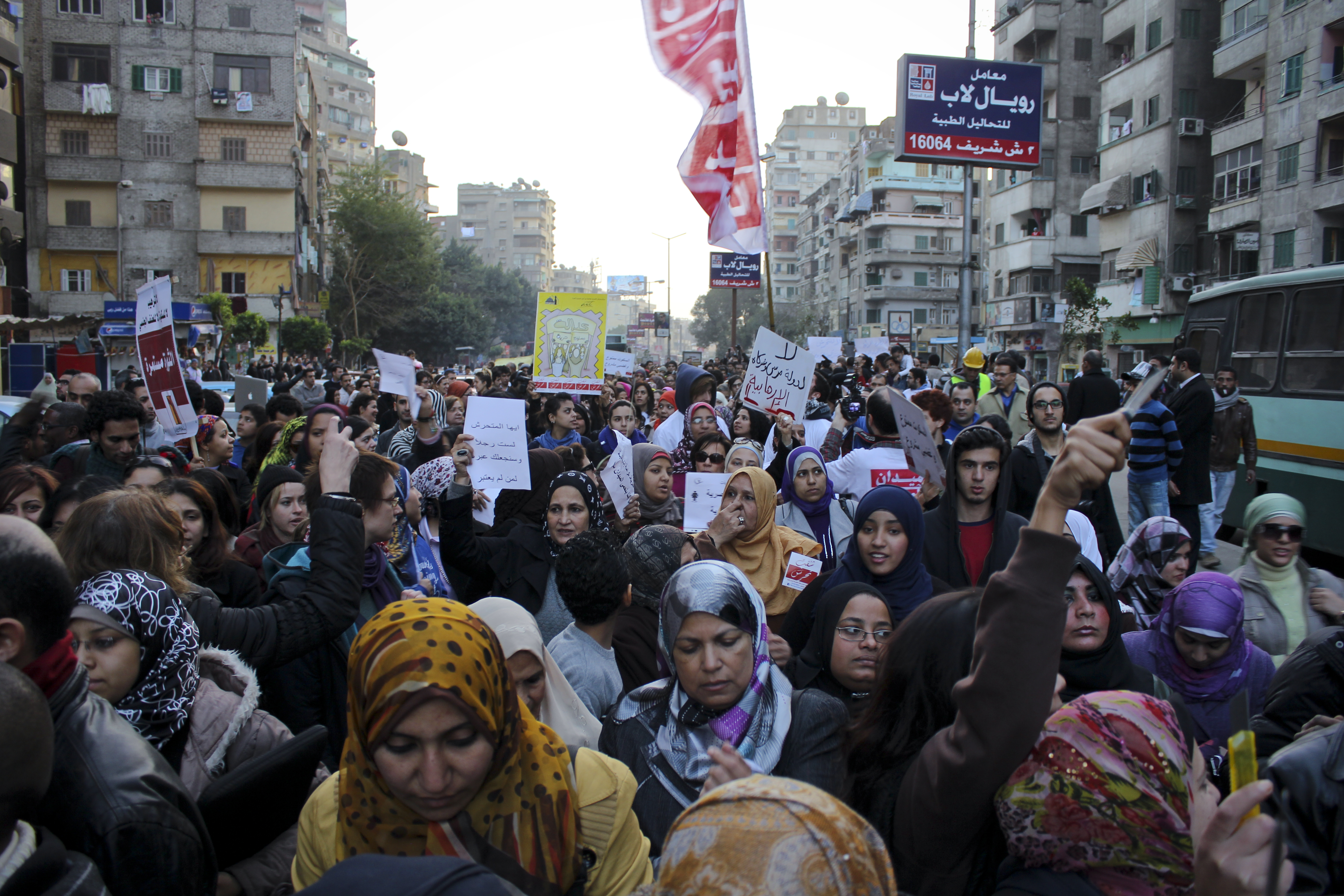
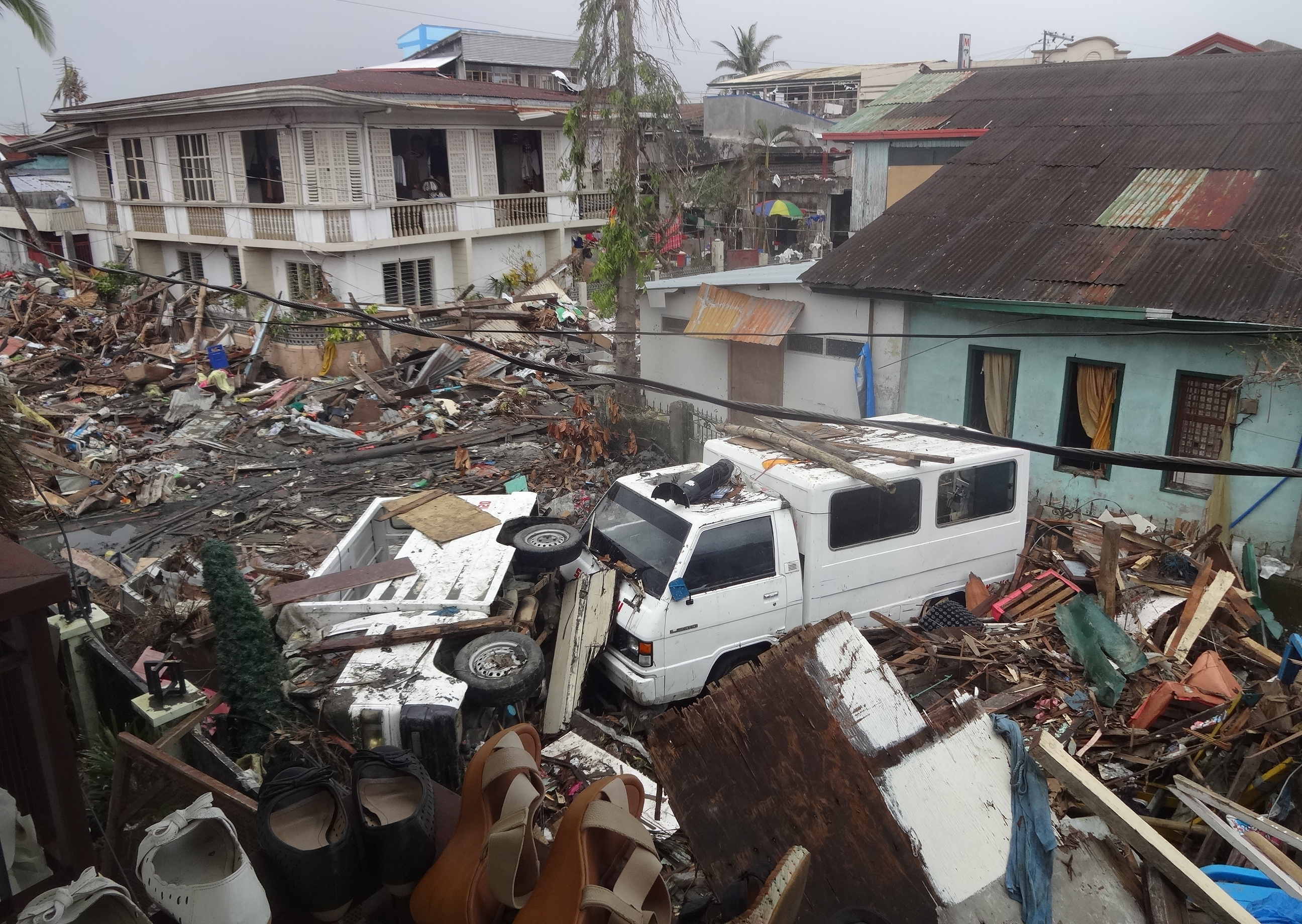
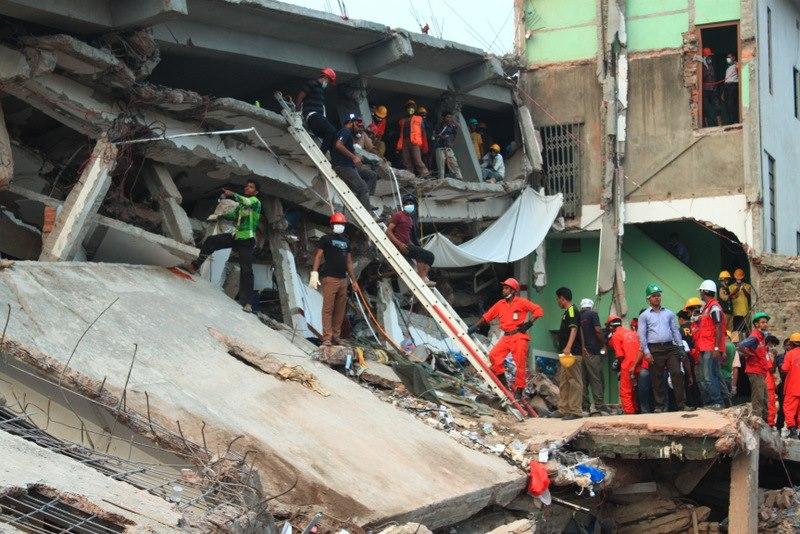
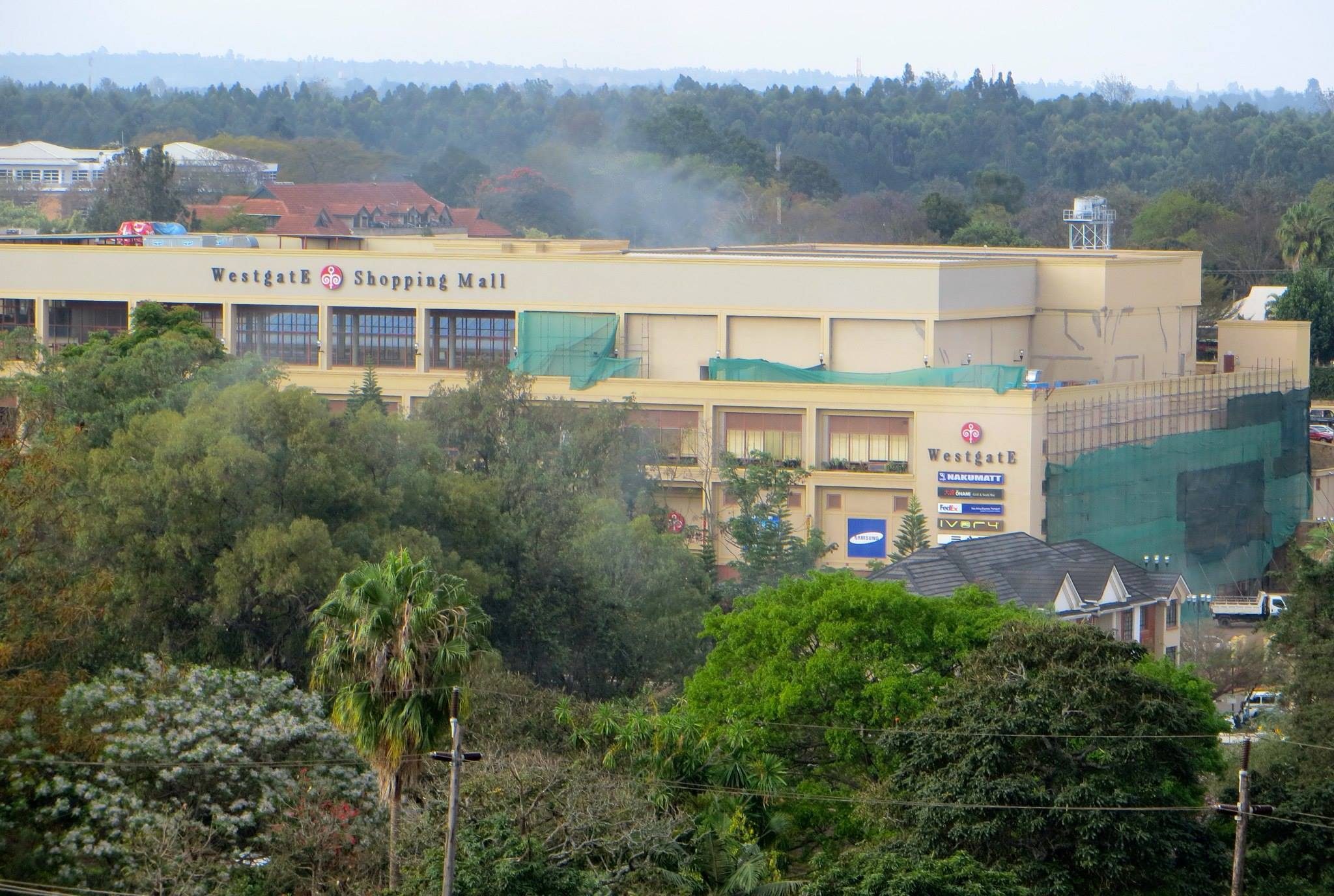
From left to right, top to bottom:
- Pope Francis is elected to the Papacy in the papal conclave;
- Edward Snowden becomes internationally famous for leaking classified NSA wiretapping information;
- The streak from the Chelyabinsk meteor that rocketed across the Russian morning sky;
- The Boston Marathon bombing kills three and injures hundreds;
- Euromaidan erupts in Ukraine;
- Protests lead to the coup d'état that overthrew President Mohamed Morsi of Egypt;
- Typhoon Haiyan kills over 6,000 in the Philippines and Southeast Asia;
- The Rana Plaza collapse in Bangladesh kills over 1,000 people;
- Smoke rises as a result of the Westgate shopping mall attack in Nairobi, Kenya, carried out by Al-Shabaab militants.

2013 (MMXIII) was a common year starting on Tuesday of the Gregorian calendar, the 2013th year of the Common Era (CE) and Anno Domini (AD) designations, the 13th year of the 3rd millennium and the 21st century, and the 4th year of the 2010s decade.

2013 was the first year since 1987 (after 26 years) to contain four unique digits, or no repeating numbers.

2013 was designated as:

- International Year of Water Cooperation
- International Year of Quinoa

== Events ==
=== January ===
- January 5 – 2013 Craig, Alaska earthquake: A M_{w} 7.5 (M_{s} 7.7, 'Moderate') earthquake shakes Prince of Wales Island.
- January 10 – At least 130 people are killed and 270 are injured in several bomb blasts in Pakistan.
- January 11 – The French military begins a 5-month intervention into the Northern Mali conflict, targeting the militant Islamist Ansar Dine group.
- January 16–20 – 39 international workers and 1 security guard die in a hostage crisis at a natural gas facility near In Aménas, Algeria.
- January 27 – An estimated 245 people die in a nightclub fire in Santa Maria, Rio Grande do Sul, Brazil.

=== February ===
- February 3 – 2013 Liechtenstein general election: The Progressive Citizens' Party led by Adrian Hasler wins a plurality of 10 seats in the Landtag.
- February 10 – Severe weather spawns eight tornadoes across southern Mississippi and southwest Alabama, including an EF4 tornado which struck the city of Hattiesburg, Mississippi.
- February 11 – The Emergency Alert Systems of five different television stations across the U.S. states of Montana, Michigan, Wisconsin, and New Mexico are hijacked, airing a false "Zombie apocalypse" hoax. It is amongst one of the largest cybersecurity breaches in EAS history.
- February 12 – North Korea conducts its third underground nuclear test, prompting widespread condemnation and tightened economic sanctions from the international community.
- February 15 – A meteor explodes over the Russian city of Chelyabinsk, injuring 1,489–1,492 people and damaging over 4,300 buildings. It is the most powerful meteor to strike Earth's atmosphere since the 1908 Tunguska event. The incident, along with a coincidental flyby of a larger asteroid, prompts international concern regarding the vulnerability of the planet to meteor strikes.
- February 21 – American scientists use a 3D printer to create a living lab-grown ear from collagen and animal ear cell cultures. In the future, it is hoped that similar ears could be grown to order as transplants for human patients with ear trauma or amputation.
- February 25 – Park Geun-hye becomes the first woman to become the president of South Korea.
- February 28 – Benedict XVI resigns as pope, becoming the first to do so since Gregory XII in 1415, and the first to do so voluntarily since Celestine V in 1294.

=== March ===
- March 13 – Cardinal Jorge Mario Bergoglio of Argentina is elected the 266th pope, whereupon he takes the name Francis and becomes the first Jesuit pope, the first pope from the Americas, and the first pope from the Southern Hemisphere.
- March 24 – Central African Republic President François Bozizé flees to the Democratic Republic of the Congo, after rebel forces capture the nation's capital, Bangui.
- March 25 – 2012–13 Cypriot financial crisis: The European Union agrees to a €10 billion economic bailout for Cyprus. The bailout loan will be equally split between the European Financial Stabilisation Mechanism, the European Financial Stability Facility, and the International Monetary Fund. The deal precipitates a banking crisis in the island nation.

=== April ===
- April 2 – The United Nations General Assembly adopts the Arms Trade Treaty to regulate the international trade of conventional weapons.
- April 8 – Death of Former United Kingdom Prime Minister Margaret Thatcher.
- April 13 – Venezuelan presidential election: Nicolás Maduro is declared winner with a narrow victory over his opponent Henrique Capriles Radonski. Protests continue to October.
- April 15 – Boston Marathon bombing: Two Chechnya-born Islamist brothers (one a United States citizen) detonate 2 bombs at the Boston Marathon in Boston, Massachusetts, in the United States, killing 3 people and injuring 264 others.
- April 20 – 2013 Lushan earthquake: A magnitude 6.6 earthquake jolts Sichuan, China, leaving 193 people dead and more than 11,000 injured.
- April 21 – Businessman Horacio Cartes wins the 2013 Paraguayan general election against Efraín Alegre.
- April 24 – The 2013 Savar building collapse, one of the worst industrial disasters in the world, kills 1,134 people in Bangladesh.
- April 30 – Willem-Alexander is inaugurated as King of the Netherlands following the abdication of his mother, Beatrix.

=== May ===
- May 14–18 – The Eurovision Song Contest 2013 takes place in Malmö, Sweden, and is won by Danish entrant Emmelie de Forest with the song "Only Teardrops".
- May 15
  - Researchers from Oregon Health & Science University in the United States describe the first production of human embryonic stem cells by cloning, in a study published in the scientific journal Nature.
  - The World Health Organization names the novel coronavirus Middle East respiratory syndrome (MERS).
- May 20 – An EF5 tornado in the US state of Oklahoma hits Moore and several other surrounding areas near Oklahoma City, resulting in 24 deaths and many injuries.
- May 22 – Off-duty British Army soldier Fusilier Lee Rigby of the Royal Regiment of Fusiliers is murdered in Woolwich, southeast London, by Islamic terrorists Michael Adebolajo and Michael Adebowale.
- May 31 –
  - The largest tornado ever recorded hits El Reno, United States. This rain-wrapped, multiple-vortex tornado was the widest tornado ever recorded, and results in eight deaths, including four storm-chasers. Measurements from mobile weather radars revealed extreme winds up to 296 mph (476 km/h) within the vortex, among the highest observed wind speeds on Earth. As it crosses U.S. 81, the tornado grows to a record-breaking width of 2.6 miles (4.2 km).

=== June ===
- June 6 – Global surveillance disclosures: Former CIA employee and NSA contractor Edward Snowden discloses operations engaged in by a U.S. government mass surveillance program to news publications and flees the country, later being granted temporary asylum in Russia.
- June 12 – Jiroemon Kimura, the verified oldest man to have ever lived, dies at 116 years and 54 days old in Japan.
- June 23 – A bus carrying 47 Romanian tourists to Tivat, Montenegro, crashes in the Morača canyon in central Montenegro, killing 19 people and injuring 27.
- June 25 – Emir of Qatar Hamad bin Khalifa Al Thani abdicates and his son Tamim bin Hamad Al Thani assumes power.
- June 26
  - Kevin Rudd defeats Julia Gillard in an Australian Labor Party leadership ballot and consequently becomes Prime Minister of Australia, three years after Gillard replaced Rudd.
  - United States v. Windsor (570 U.S. 744) decided in the Supreme Court of the United States, overturning a key section of the Defense of Marriage Act and hence granting federal recognition to same-sex marriage in the United States.

=== July ===
- July 1 – Croatia becomes the 28th member of the European Union.
- July 3 – Amid protests, Egyptian President Mohamed Morsi is deposed in a military coup d'état, leading to widespread violence.
- July 6
  - A runaway train carrying crude oil derails in Lac-Mégantic, Quebec, catching fire and exploding, killing 47 people.
  - Asiana Airlines Flight 214 crashes while landing at San Francisco International Airport, killing 3 people.
- July 21 – Philippe is sworn in as King of the Belgians, following the abdication of his father, Albert II.
- July 22–28 – XIV World Youth Day, in Rio de Janeiro, Brazil.

=== August ===
- August 14 – Following the military coup in Egypt, two anti-coup camps are raided by the security forces, leaving 2,696 people dead. The raids are described by Human Rights Watch as "one of the world's largest killings of demonstrators in a single day in recent history".
- August 15 – Horacio Cartes is sworn in as President of Paraguay.
- August 19 – All-time most expensive public school in Norway, Kuben Upper Secondary School, opens.
- August 21 – 1,429 are killed in the Ghouta chemical attack during the Syrian Civil War.
- August 29 – The United Kingdom Parliament votes against UK military attacks on Syria.

=== September ===
- September 7
  - 2013 Australian federal election: The Liberal/National Coalition led by Tony Abbott defeats the Labor Government led by Prime Minister Kevin Rudd. Abbott is sworn in on September 18.
  - The International Olympic Committee awards Tokyo the right to host the 2020 Summer Olympics.
- September 8 – The 2013 Colorado floods begin, resulting from heavy rain in the Colorado River Basin.
- September 16 – Twelve people are killed during the Washington Navy Yard shooting.
- September 17 – Grand Theft Auto V earns more than half a billion dollars on its first day of release.
- September 21 – Al-Shabaab militants attack the Westgate shopping mall in Nairobi, Kenya, killing at least 62 civilians and wounding over 170.

=== October ===
- October 10 – Delegates from some 140 countries and territories sign the Minamata Treaty, a UNEP treaty designed to protect human health and the environment from emissions and releases of mercury and mercury compounds.
- October 12 – Twelve people are killed when an apartment building collapses in Medellín, Colombia.
- October 15 – A magnitude 7.2 earthquake struck Bohol, Philippines, leaving 222 dead, 8 missing, and 976 people injured.
- October 16 – Lao Airlines Flight 301 crashes on approach to Pakse Airport, Laos, killing all 49 people on board.
- October 17 – Microsoft releases Windows 8.1.
- October 18 – Saudi Arabia rejects a seat on the United Nations Security Council, making it the first country to reject a seat on the Security Council. Jordan takes the seat on December 6.
- October 24 – The Republic of Cape Verde officially renames itself the Republic of Cabo Verde.

=== November ===
- November 5 – The uncrewed Mars Orbiter Mission is launched by India from its launch pad in Sriharikota.
- November 8 – Typhoon Haiyan (Yolanda), one of the strongest tropical cyclones on record, hits the Philippines and Vietnam, causing devastation with at least 6,241 people dead.
- November 12 – Three Studies of Lucian Freud, a series of portraits of Lucian Freud by the British painter Francis Bacon, sells for US$142.4 million in a New York City auction, setting a world record for an auctioned work of art.
- November 17
  - Fifty people are killed when Tatarstan Airlines Flight 363 crashes at Kazan Airport, Russia.
  - A tornado outbreak occurs in Illinois, United States. An EF4 tornado in Washington causes $935 million ($1.292 billion adjusted) of property damage, killing 3 people.
- November 21
  - Euromaidan pro-EU demonstrations begin in Ukraine after President Viktor Yanukovych rejects an economic association agreement between the European Union and Ukraine in favor of closer ties to Russia.
  - Moldovan-flagged cargo ship MV Rhosus makes port in Beirut, Lebanon, carrying 2,750 tonnes of ammonium nitrate. After inspection by port state control, the Rhosus is deemed unseaworthy, and is forbidden to set sail. By order of an Urgent Matters judge in Beirut, the cargo is brought ashore in 2014 and placed in Warehouse 12 at the port, where it will remain for six years. The ammonium nitrate will erupt in a massive explosion on August 4, 2020.
- November 24 – Iran agrees to limit their nuclear development program in exchange for sanctions relief.
- November 29 – A police helicopter crashes into The Clutha, a pub in Glasgow, Scotland, killing 10 people and injuring 31.

=== December ===
- December 7 – Ninth Ministerial Conference of the World Trade Organization delegates sign the Bali Package agreement aimed at loosening global trade barriers.
- December 14 – Chinese uncrewed spacecraft Chang'e 3, carrying the Yutu rover, becomes the first spacecraft to "soft"-land on the Moon since 1976 and the third ever robotic rover to do so.
- December 15 – South Sudanese Civil War: Fighting between ethnic Dinka and Nuer members of the presidential guard break out in Juba, South Sudan, plunging the country into civil war.

== Nobel Prizes ==

- Chemistry – Martin Karplus, Michael Levitt, and Arieh Warshel
- Economics – Eugene Fama, Lars Peter Hansen and Robert J. Shiller
- Literature – Alice Munro
- Peace – Organisation for the Prohibition of Chemical Weapons
- Physics – François Englert and Peter Higgs
- Physiology or Medicine – James E. Rothman, Randy W. Schekman, and Thomas C. Südhof

== New English words ==
- bingeable

== See also ==
- List of international years
