= City of New Orleans (disambiguation) =

The City of New Orleans, also called New Orleans, is the largest city in the U.S. state of Louisiana.

City of New Orleans may also refer to:

- City of New Orleans (train), a passenger train service in the United States.
- "City of New Orleans" (song), by Steve Goodman
- City of New Orleans (album), by Willie Nelson
- The City of New Orleans, a steamboat operated by the Anchor Line on the Mississippi River from 1881 to 1898

== See also ==
- New Orleans (disambiguation)
