= Battle of Orléans =

Battle of Orléans or Siege of Orléans may refer to:

- Siege of Orléans (451), during the Hunnic invasion of Gaul
- Battle of Orléans (463), during the Gothic war against Aegidius
- Siege of Orléans (1428–1429), during the Hundred Years' War, first victory of Joan of Arc
- Siege of Orléans (1563), during the French Wars of Religion
- Battle of Orléans (October 1870), during the Franco-Prussian War
- Battle of Orléans (December 1870), during the Franco-Prussian War

== See also ==
- Battle of New Orleans (disambiguation)
