= Battle of New Orleans (disambiguation) =

The Battle of New Orleans was fought in January 1815, part of the War of 1812.

Battle of New Orleans may also refer to:

- Capture of New Orleans, 1862 operation of the American Civil War
- Battle of Liberty Place, 1874 battle between Democratic Conservatives and Republican Reconstructionists
- "The Battle of New Orleans", a song by Jimmie Driftwood
- "The Battle of New Orleans", 1910 painting by Edward Percy Moran

== See also ==
- Battle of Orléans (disambiguation)
