= Collapse of the Space Building =

2013 building collapse in Colombia

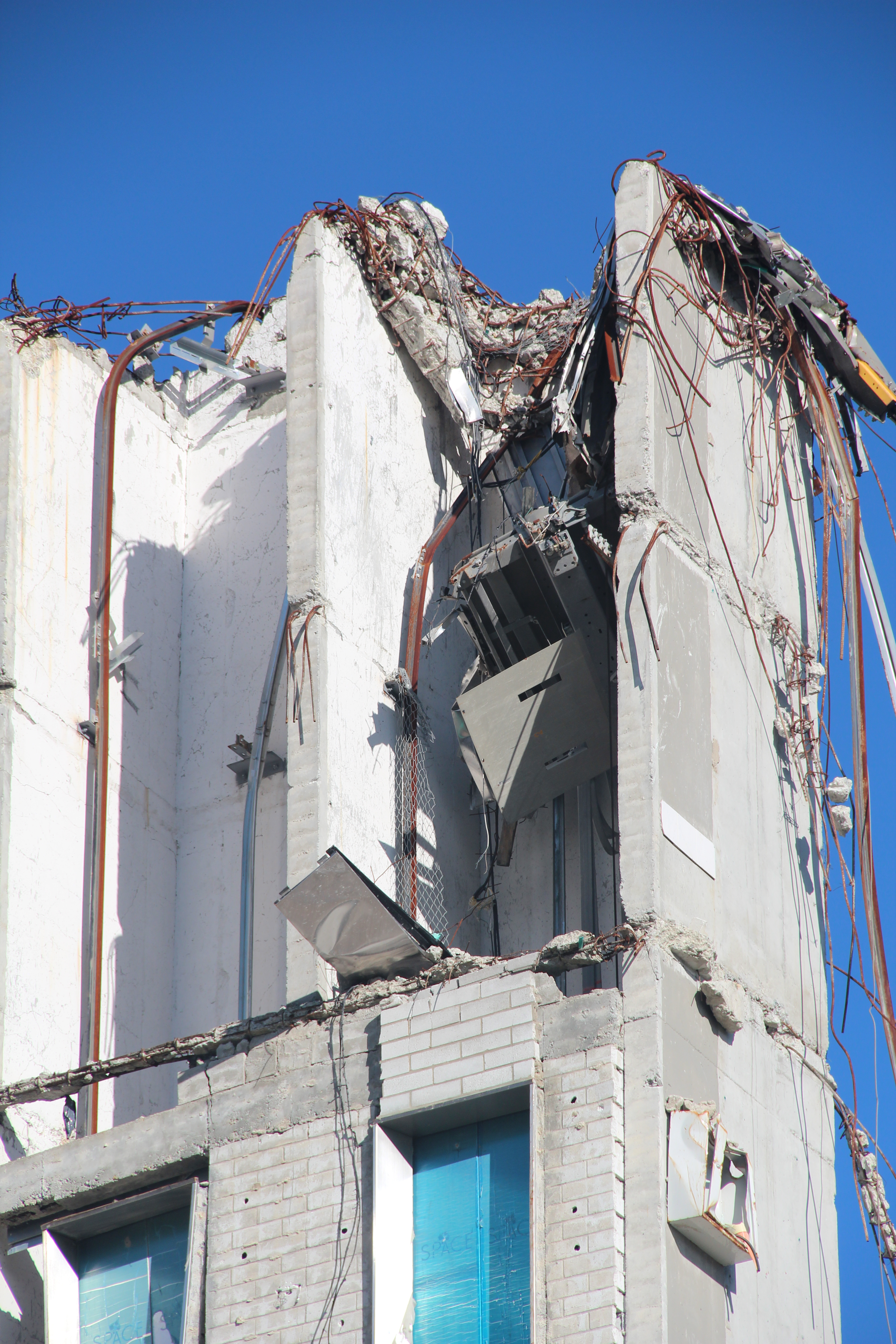
- Date: October 12, 2013
- Time: 8:20 PM (CST)
- Location: 6°12′47″N 75°33′21″W
- Type: Structural failure
- Deaths: 12
- Injuries: Unknown
- Property damage: $40.6 billion (2016 COP)
- Displaced: 100+
- Convictions: Loss of license for 4 designers

The collapse of the Space Building occurred on the night of 12 October 2013, when Tower 6 of the Space Building, a residential apartment complex, collapsed in Medellín, Colombia, killing 12 people. Local authorities evacuated the rest of the building to avoid an imminent new collapse. The cost of the building was more than Col$40.6 billion (2013 value).

On 20 January 2014, researchers from the Faculty of Engineering of the University of the Andes determined that the building should be partially demolished, since the lack of structural capacity of the building's columns did not allow them to support the normal loads to which they were subjected. According to the inquiries that were carried out after the collapse, if the building had been designed with all the requirements of Law 400 of 1997, Tower 6 would not have collapsed.

On 27 February 2014, Tower 5 of the Space Building was demolished but the necessary mechanisms for the complete demolition of the structure were not met. On 23 September 2014, what remained of the apartment building was completely demolished after Tower 5 was demolished. The event caused the housing minister at the time, Luis Felipe Henao, to ratify a law that ceased the construction of buildings that did not rigorously comply with the requirements of Law 400.

== Description ==
The Space Building, located at Carrera 24 D # 10 E −120 in the city of Medellín, was built from 2006 until its completion in 2013.

The 6 stages (or towers) have different numbers of levels and basements from each other. Stage 6, the last one built, was the highest, with a total of 24 floors and 4 basements. The first stages had 2 and 3 basements.

== Background ==
The construction of the Space residential complex presented differential settlement problems which were addressed through interventions in the foundation in August 2013. Other structural problems were noted. In the morning hours of 11 October, the day before the collapse, the inhabitants of the Space Building contacted the Disaster Risk Management Administrative Department (DAGRD) because a stage 6 column had failed. The entity observed the problems and structural failure of the column, and therefore decided to evacuate stage 6 of the Space Building.

== Collapse ==
The CDO company decided to send crews of workers to stage 6 to repair the failure that had occurred. While they were working, the entire stage 6 collapsed on 12 October 2013, at 8:20 PM CST. The collapse left a total of 12 people dead.

== Aftermath ==
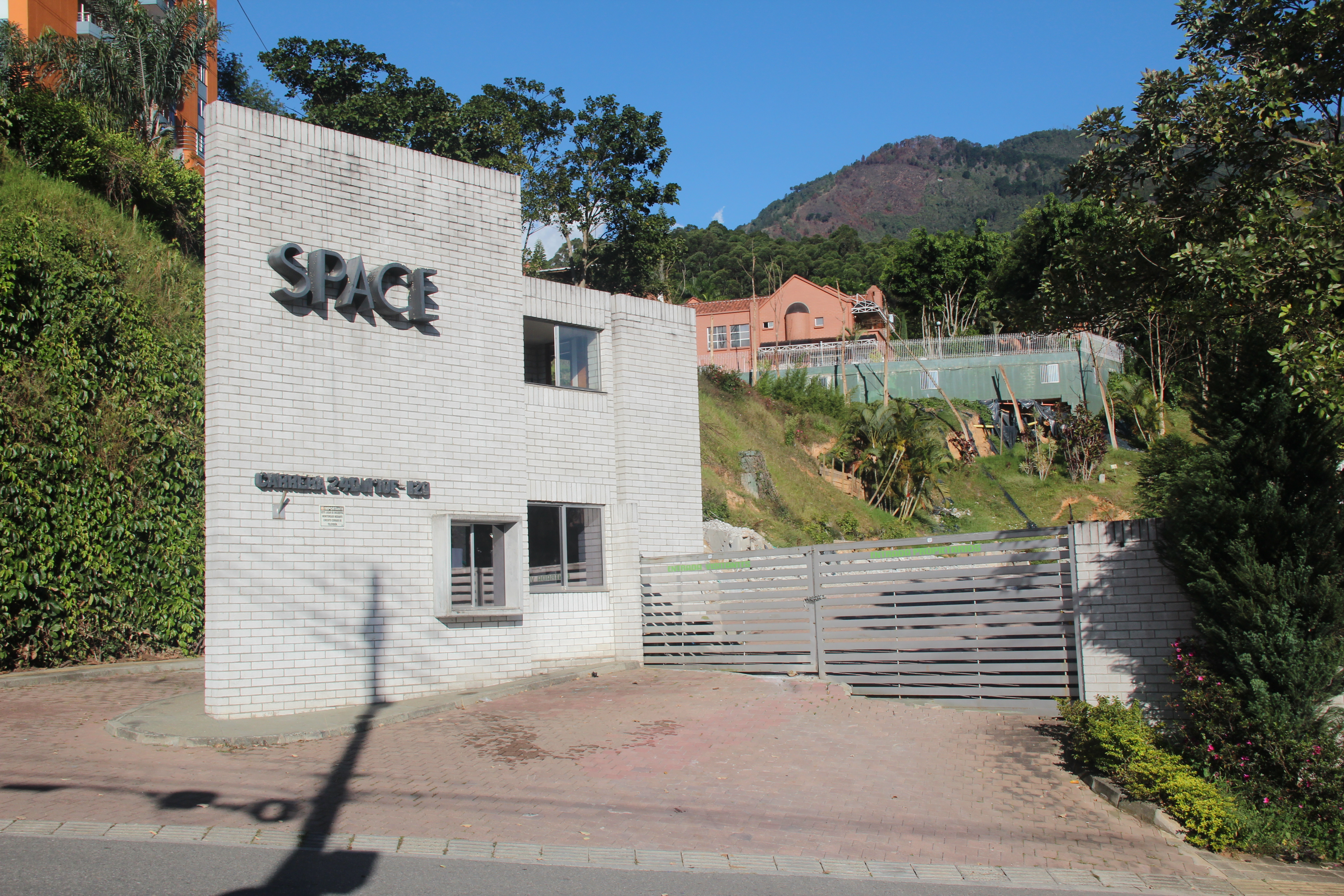
The entrance gate to Tower 6 following the collapse

After the collapse of stage 6, the entire building was evacuated. The Mayor's Office of Medellín hired the Universidad de los Andes to carry out the respective investigations to determine the most probable causes of the collapse of the portion of the building corresponding to stage 6, the collapse of stage 6 was mainly related to the lack of structural capacity of the columns of the Space Building. These, according to the study, were not able to withstand the normal loads to which they were subjected. According to the conclusions, if the building had been designed with all the requirements of Law 400 of '97, stage six would not have collapsed.

On 27 February 2014, Tower 5 of the Space Building was demolished. On 23 September 2014, what remained of the apartment building was completely demolished after Tower 5 was demolished.

The event caused the housing minister at the time, Luis Felipe Henao, to create the law called Antispace to stop the construction of buildings that did not rigorously comply with the requirements of Law 400 of 1997.

In April 2018, professors Luis Enrique García, Francisco Correal and Luis Eduardo Yamín received the ACI Design Award from the American Concrete Institute for the research results of the collapse of the Space Building.

== Sanctions ==
In parallel with the controlled demolition of the stages of the Space Building that did not collapse during the initial event in Tower 6, the National Professional Engineering Council (COPNIA) of Colombia carried out an investigation into those responsible for the design, review and construction of the building which After three and a half years and in the second instance, the following sanctions resulted:

- Structural designer (Jorge Aristizábal): Cancellation of professional registration for life.
- Structural reviewer (Edgar Ardila): Cancellation of professional registration for life.
- Builders of the building (María Cecilia Posada and Pablo Villegas): Suspension of professional registration between 20 and 22 months.
- Soil study (Bernardo Vieco): Suspension of professional registration for 6 months.

== See also ==
- Surfside condominium collapse, another apartment collapse in 2021
- Collapse of the World Trade Center, a series of skyscraper collapses in 2001
